= Arkansas Highway 51 =

State Highway in Arkansas

Highway 51

Route information
- Maintained by ArDOT
- Existed: April 1, 1926–present

Section 1
- Length: 57.37 mi (92.33 km)
- South end: AR 53 near Whelen Springs
- North end: US 67 in Donaldson

Section 2
- Length: 7.92 mi (12.75 km)
- South end: US 270 in Rockport
- North end: US 270 in Magnet Cove

Location
- Country: United States
- State: Arkansas
- Counties: Clark, Hot Spring

Highway system
- Arkansas Highway System; Interstate; US; State; Business; Spurs; Suffixed; Scenic; Heritage
← AR 50	→ AR 52

Highway 51 (AR 51, Ark. 51, and Hwy. 51) is a designation for two north–south state highways in Southwest Arkansas. One route of 53.37 miles (85.89 km) begins Highway 53 near Whelen Springs and runs north to US Highway 67 (US 67) in Donaldson. A second route of 7.92 miles (12.75 km) runs parallel to US 270 northwest of Malvern. Both routes are maintained by the Arkansas Department of Transportation (ArDOT).

A four-mile-long (6.4 km) historic section of Highway 51 remains in Clark County, and is listed on the National Register of Historic Places.

== Route description ==
Both segments are low-traffic, two-lane, undivided roads winding through the Piney Woods of Southwest Arkansas. No segment of Highway 51 has been listed as part of the National Highway System, a network of roads important to the nation's economy, defense, and mobility.

The ArDOT maintains Highway 51 like all other parts of the state highway system. As a part of these responsibilities, the department tracks the volume of traffic using its roads in surveys using a metric called average annual daily traffic (AADT). ArDOT estimates the traffic level for a segment of roadway for any average day of the year in these surveys.

=== Whelen Springs to Donaldson ===
Highway 51 begins at Highway 53 in southern Clark County, just north of Whelen Springs and the Little Missouri River. The highway runs within the Arkansas Timberlands of Southwest Arkansas, a two-lane, undivided road except for a few miles within Arkadelphia.

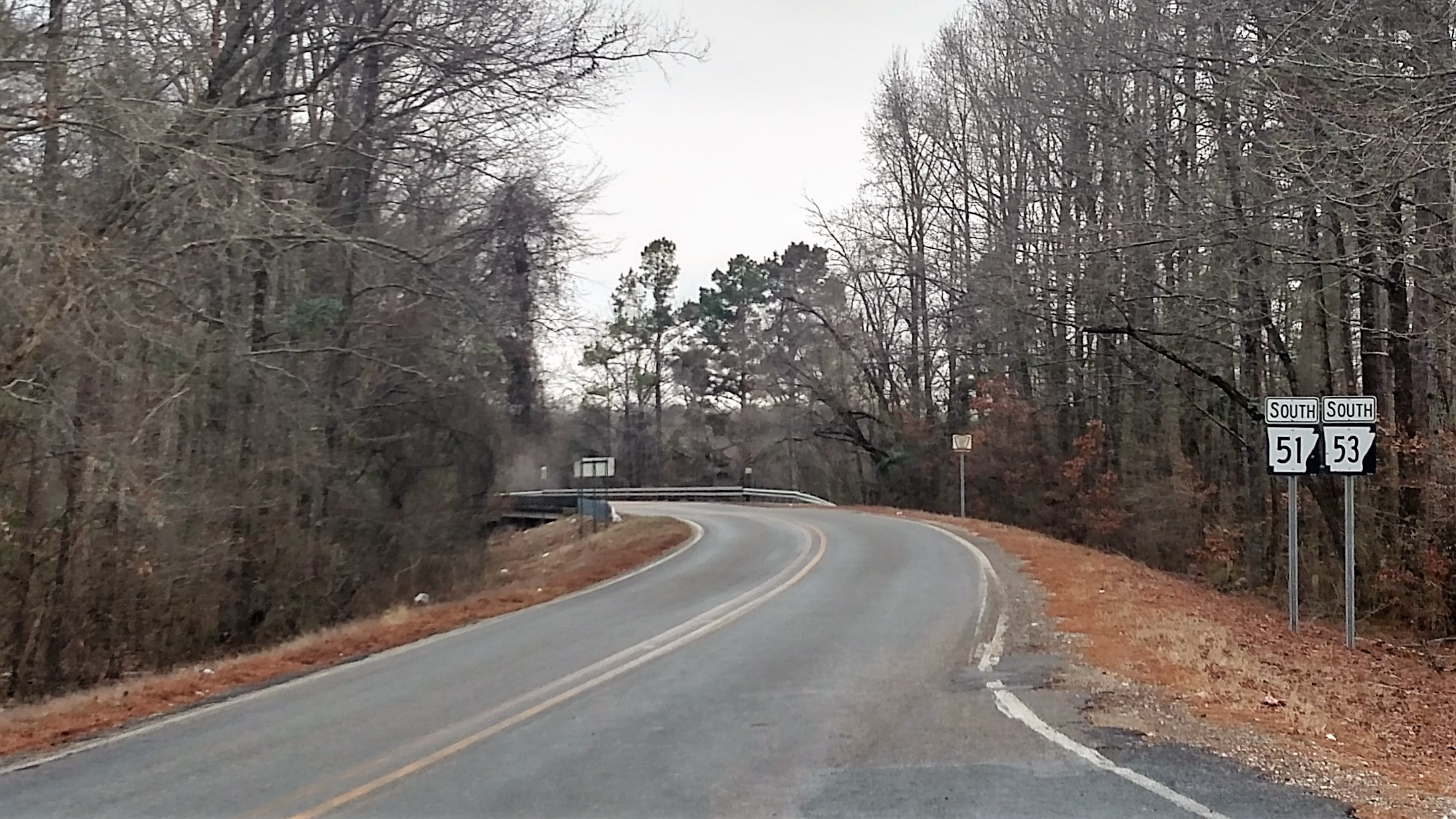
Highway 51 near Okolona

The route runs west through sparsely populated pine forest, curving northward after Sycamore and crossing McNeeley Creek twice. Highway 51 crosses the Union Pacific Railroad tracks and a former alignment near Beirne, a small mill town. North of Beirne, Highway 51 begins a wrong-way concurrency with US Highway 67 (US 67). Less than two miles from the Nevada County line, Highway 51 turns north from the concurrency. Highway 51 intersects Interstate 30 (I-30) at a diamond interchange, then continues north through Burtsell. The highway begins paralleling the Caddo Valley Railroad and South Fork Terre Noir Creek, before crossing both shortly after entering the city limits of Okolona. In Okolona, the route passes the historic Okolona Colored High School Gymnasium, listed on the National Register of Historic Places (NRHP) before an intersection with Highway 182. Highway 51 exits the town to the northeast, briefly overlapping Highway 53 to cross Terre Noir Creek near Holly Grove. Highway 51 turns east to Arkadelphia, passing the Terre Noire Natural Area, which contains blackland prairies and woodland complexes. Highway 51 serves as the eastern terminus of Highway 26 and passes the Bozeman House before entering the city limits.

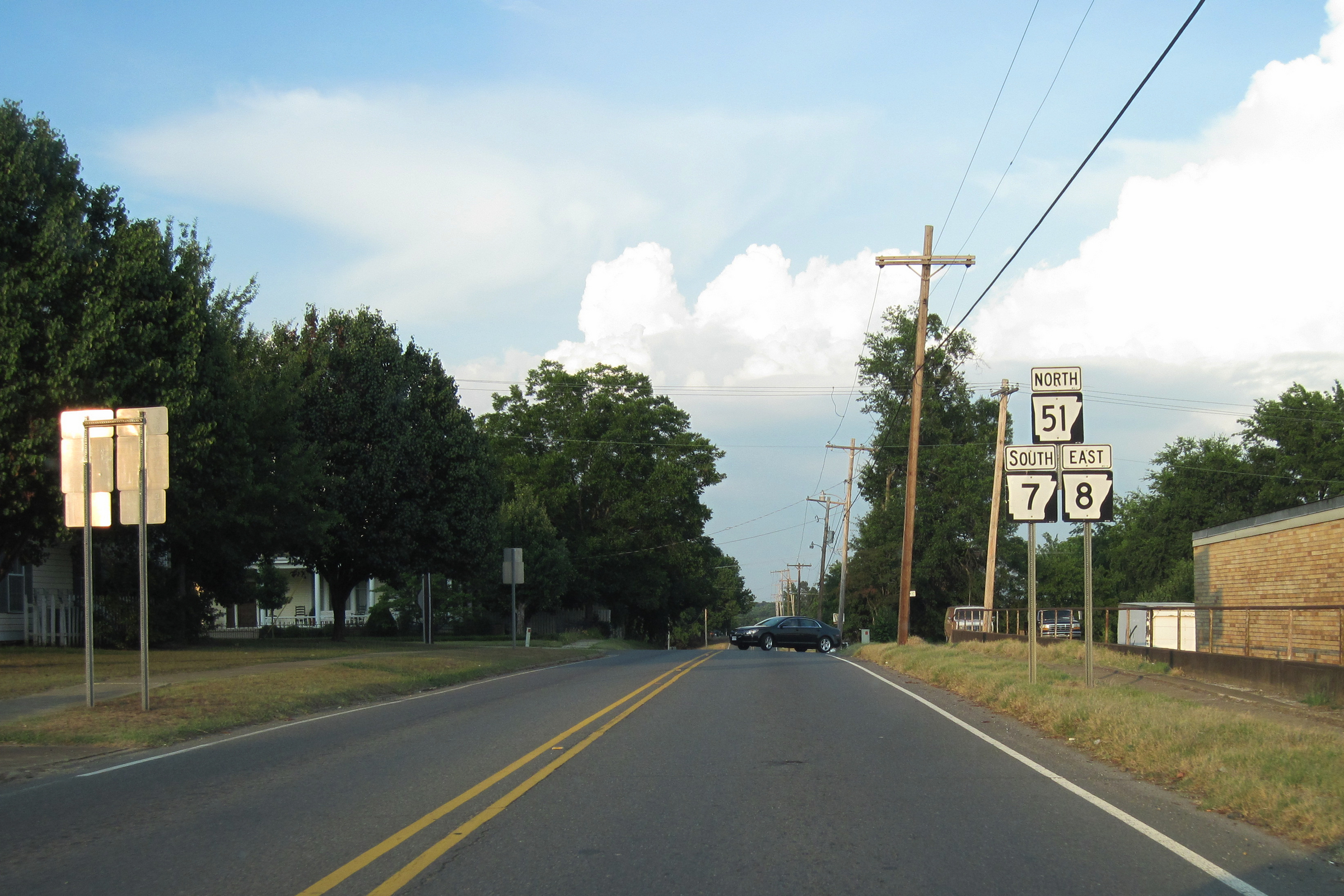
Highway 7, 8, and 51 reassurance markers in Arkadelphia

In Arkadelphia, Highway 51 becomes Hollywood Road and passes Magnolia Manor before an intersection with Highway 8. The two routes begin a concurrency running east, crossing I-30 at a diamond interchange. Highway 8/Highway 51 enter Arkadelphia as Pine Street, serving a mix of commercial and residential land uses before intersecting US 67 and Highway 7 (Tenth Street). The four highways overlap southbound as Tenth Street for two blocks, before turning onto Caddo Street and heading east toward downtown Arkadelphia, passing the historic Clark County Library. At an intersection with Sixth Street, US 67 turns south toward the Arkadelphia Commercial Historic District, and the three state highways continue east to cross the Ouachita River on the Ouachita River Bridge. Shortly after the bridge, Highway 7 and Highway 8 split south toward Griffithtown.

Highway 51 runs east to Joan, where it intersects Highway 128. The highway turns north, entering Hot Spring County. It passes through Brown Springs before serving as the western terminus of Highway 222 east of Donaldson. Highway 51 passes through the small town of Donaldson as Bryant Drive before an intersection with US 67, where it terminates.

Except for the areas around Arkadelphia, traffic counts in 2016 show much of Highway 51 is classified as a very low volume local road by American Association of State Highway and Transportation Officials (AASHTO), meaning fewer than 400 vehicles per day.

=== Malvern ===
A second segment of Highway 51 begins at US 270 on the municipal boundary between Rockport and Malvern. It runs north through the small town of Rockport before turning westward toward Butterfield and Magnet Cove. West of Magnet Cove, the highway terminates at US 270. AADT for the highway was highest near Rockport, with 3,200 vehicles per day. Near the western terminus, the traffic counts dropped to 1,400.

== History ==
- Arkansas 51, Old, Curtis to Gum Springs
- U.S. National Register of Historic Places
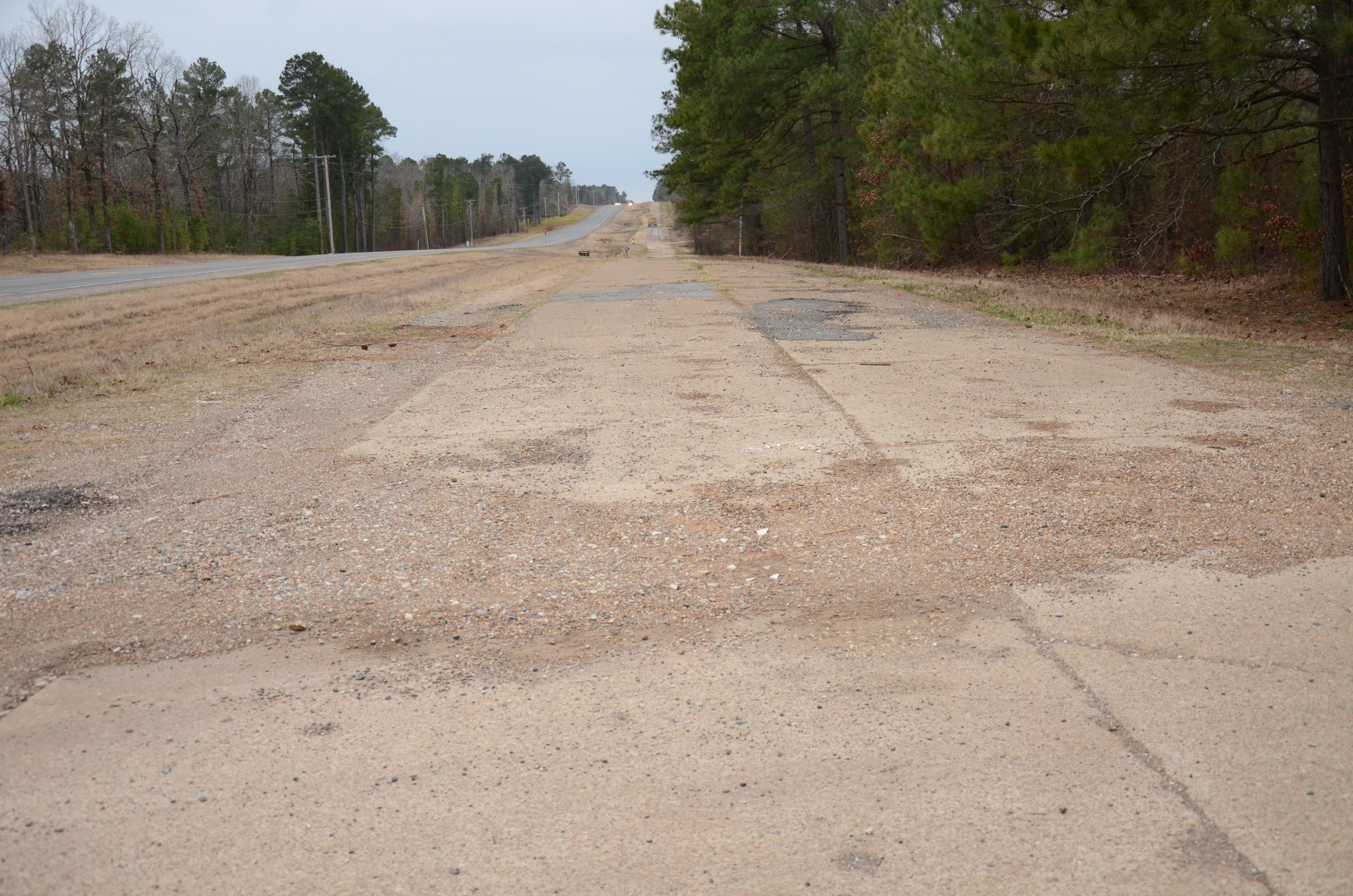
- Historic section of Highway 51
- Area: 9.5 acres (3.8 ha)
- Built: 1931
- Built by: D.H. Dalton Co.
- MPS: Arkansas Highway History and Architecture MPS
- NRHP reference No.: 03001457
- Added to NRHP: January 21, 2004

Highway 51 was created during the 1926 Arkansas state highway numbering as a route between US 67 and Arkadelphia in Clark County.

Near Berine, a former alignment now bears the Clark County Road 12 designation. Along the former alignment, the McNeely Creek Bridge is listed on the National Register of Historic Places. To the east of Arkadelphia, Highway 51 formerly crossed the Ouachita River on a historic truss bridge. The bridge was closed to vehicular traffic in 2018 upon the opening of a new bridge.

Between Curtis and Gum Springs, a four-mile-long (6.4 km) stretch of concrete pavement built in 1931 remains intact. Part of the original Highway 51 alignment between Little Rock with Texarkana, the pavement was used until the present section of US 67 was built in 1965. The road section was listed on the National Register of Historic Places in 2004.

== Major intersections ==
Mile markers reset at concurrencies.

County	Location	mi	km	Destinations	Notes
Clark		0.00	0.00	AR 53 – Camden, Gurdon	Southern terminus
Clark		8.18– 0.00	13.16– 0.00	US 67 – Gurdon, Prescott	
Clark		2.42	3.89	I-30 – Little Rock, Texarkana	
Clark	Okolona	10.24	16.48	AR 182 east – Gurdon	Western terminus of AR 182
Clark		18.15– 18.99	29.21– 30.56	AR 53 – Gurdon	Officially designated exception
Clark		24.24	39.01	AR 26 west – Murfreesboro	Eastern terminus of AR 26
Clark	Arkadelphia	28.91	46.53	AR 8 west – Glenwood	Begin AR 8 overlap
Clark	Arkadelphia	29.09	46.82	I-30 – Texarkana, Little Rock	I-30 exit 73
Clark	Arkadelphia	31.31	50.39	US 67 north / AR 7 north (10th Street) – Malvern, Hot Springs	Begin US 67/AR 7 overlap
Clark	Arkadelphia	0.00	0.00	US 67 south (6th Street) – Gurdon	End US 67 overlap
Clark	Arkadelphia	0.38– 0.47	0.61– 0.76	Bridge over the Ouachita River	
Clark		1.57	2.53	AR 7 south / AR 8 east – Fordyce	End AR 7/AR 8 overlap
Clark	Joan	6.74	10.85	AR 128 west – Gravel Junction	Eastern terminus of AR 128
Hot Spring		15.83	25.48	AR 222 east – Leola	Western terminus of AR 222
Hot Spring	Donaldson	17.35	27.92	AR 51Y (Bryant Drive) to US 67 – Malvern	Eastern terminus of AR 51Y
Hot Spring	Donaldson	17.88	28.78	US 67 – Malvern	Northern terminus
Hot Spring	Gap in route				
Hot Spring	Rockport–Malvern line	0.00	0.00	US 270 (Oliver Lancaster Boulevard) – Malvern, Jones Mill	Southern terminus
Hot Spring	Magnet Cove	7.92	12.75	US 270 – Hot Springs, Malvern	Northern terminus
1.000 mi = 1.609 km; 1.000 km = 0.621 mi: Concurrency terminus

== See also ==
- National Register of Historic Places listings in Clark County, Arkansas
