= Arkansas Highway 53 =

State highway in Arkansas, United States

Highway 53

Route information
- Maintained by ArDOT

Section 1
- Length: 27.09 mi (43.60 km)
- South end: Bradley Road at the Louisiana state line near State Line
- North end: US 82 in Stamps

Section 2
- Length: 26.22 mi (42.20 km)
- South end: US 82 in Buckner
- North end: US 371 near Lanesburg

Section 3
- Length: 32.55 mi (52.38 km)
- South end: AR 24 near Whelen Springs
- Major intersections: US 67 in Gurdon; I-30 near Gurdon
- North end: AR 8 near Alpine

Location
- Country: United States
- State: Arkansas
- Counties: Clark, Lafayette, Nevada

Highway system
- Arkansas Highway System; Interstate; US; State; Business; Spurs; Suffixed; Scenic; Heritage
← AR 52	→ AR 54

Highway 53 (AR 53, Ark. 53, and Hwy. 53) is a designation for two north–south state highways in Southwest Arkansas, United States. One route of 53.31 miles (85.79 km) begins at the Louisiana state line and runs north to US Highway 371 (US 371) south of Prescott. A second route of 32.55 miles (52.38 km) begins at Highway 24 and runs north through Gurdon to Highway 8. Both routes are maintained by the Arkansas State Highway and Transportation Department (AHTD).

== History ==
Highway 53 was created during the 1926 Arkansas state highway numbering as a route between State Road 24 in eastern Nevada County and Gurdon. The route was extended from Gurdon north to Holly Grove on July 10, 1957, adding 11 miles (18 km). Six years later, Highway 53 was extended from Holly Grove north to Hollywood, creating a new overlap with Highway 51, on April 24, 1963. The highway was extended north for the last time from Hollywood to Highway 8 on June 23, 1965.

Between September 1929 and March 1930, a second segment between and Bodcaw and State Road 19 (now US 371) was added to the state highway system. The route was extended south from Bodcaw to Falcon on July 10, 1957, and extended south to US 82 at Buckner on April 24, 1963. A third section of Highway 53 was created in Lafayette County between the Louisiana state line and McKamie on March 7, 1961. The gap between the two southern routes was closed two years later when Highway 53 was extended north from McKamie to US 82 Truck in Stamps on June 23, 1965.

== Major intersections ==
County	Location	mi	km	Destinations	Notes
Lafayette		0.00	0.00	Bradley Road, Louisiana state line	Southern terminus; southern terminus of segment 5
Lafayette		2.43– 7.28	3.91– 11.72	AR 160 – Bradley, Taylor	
Lafayette		13.92	22.40	AR 360 west – Canfield	Eastern terminus of AR 360
Lafayette	Mars Hill	17.66	28.42	AR 313 north – Lewisville	Southern terminus of AR 313
Lafayette	Stamps	27.09	43.60	US 82 west (Antigo Street) – Lewisville	Begin US 82 overlap; northern terminus of segment 5
Lafayette	Gap in route				
Lafayette	Buckner	0.00	0.00	US 82 east (Myrtle Street) – Magnolia	End US 82 overlap; southern terminus of segment 4
Nevada	Falcon	7.96– 8.06	12.81– 12.97	AR 355 – Waldo, Patmos	
Nevada		11.91– 14.09	19.17– 22.68	AR 32 – Willisville, Hope	
Nevada		19.10	30.74	US 278 – Rosston, Hope	
Nevada		22.41	36.07	AR 73 north – Hope	Southern terminus of AR 73
Nevada		24.84	39.98	AR 372 east to US 371 – Laneburg	Western terminus of AR 372
Nevada		25.96	41.78	AR 299 north – Emmet	Begin AR 299 overlap
Nevada		26.22	42.20	US 371 / AR 299 south – Magnolia, Prescott	Northern terminus of segment 3
Nevada	Gap in route				
Nevada		0.00	0.00	AR 24 – Prescott, White Oak Lake State Park	Southern terminus of segment 2
Clark	Barringer	4.94	7.95	AR 51 north – Beirne	Southern terminus of AR 372
Clark	Gurdon	11.14	17.93	US 67 south (Elm Street) – Prescott	Begin US 67 overlap; northern terminus of segment 1
Clark		0.00	0.00	US 67 north – Arkadelphia	End US 67 overlap; southern terminus of segment 0
Clark		5.05	8.13	I-30 – Little Rock, Texarkana	Exit 63 (I-30)
Clark	Holly Grove	10.71– 11.53	17.24– 18.56	AR 51 – Okolona, Arkadelphia	Officially designated exception (Note: Map note for officially designated exception: EXCEPT.-0.88 MI. OVER S.H. 51 9.89-10.77)
Clark	Hollywood	14.52	23.37	AR 26 – Arkadelphia, Antoine	
Clark		21.41	34.46	AR 8 – Arkadelphia, Amity	Northern terminus of segment 0
1.000 mi = 1.609 km; 1.000 km = 0.621 mi: Concurrency terminus
