= Arkansas Highway 182 =

State highway in Arkansas, United States

Highway 182

Route information
- Maintained by ArDOT

Section 1
- Length: 7.2 mi (11.6 km)
- West end: US 70 near Welsh
- East end: AR 84 in Amity

Section 2
- Length: 12.4 mi (20.0 km)
- From: AR 51 in Okolona
- To: US 67 / AR 53 in Gurdon

Location
- Country: United States
- State: Arkansas
- Counties: Montgomery, Clark

Highway system
- Arkansas Highway System; Interstate; US; State; Business; Spurs; Suffixed; Scenic; Heritage
← AR 181	→ AR 183

Arkansas Highway 182 (AR 182, Ark. 182, and Hwy. 182) is the designation for a state highway in the U.S. state of Arkansas. The highway itself is split into two sections, both of which are mainly located in southwest Arkansas. The first section begins at U.S. Route 70 (US 70) just east of Welsh, and ends at AR 84 in Amity. The second section begins at AR 51 in Okolona, and ends at US 67 and AR 53 in Gurdon.

== Route description ==
=== Western section ===
AR 182 begins at US 70 just west of the unincorporated community of Welsh. The route travels almost directly south for about 7.2 miles (11.6 km) until it reaches its eastern terminus at AR 84 in Amity. The route itself does not intersect any other communities or highways, but it does cross the Caddo River shortly before its eastern terminus.

=== Eastern section ===
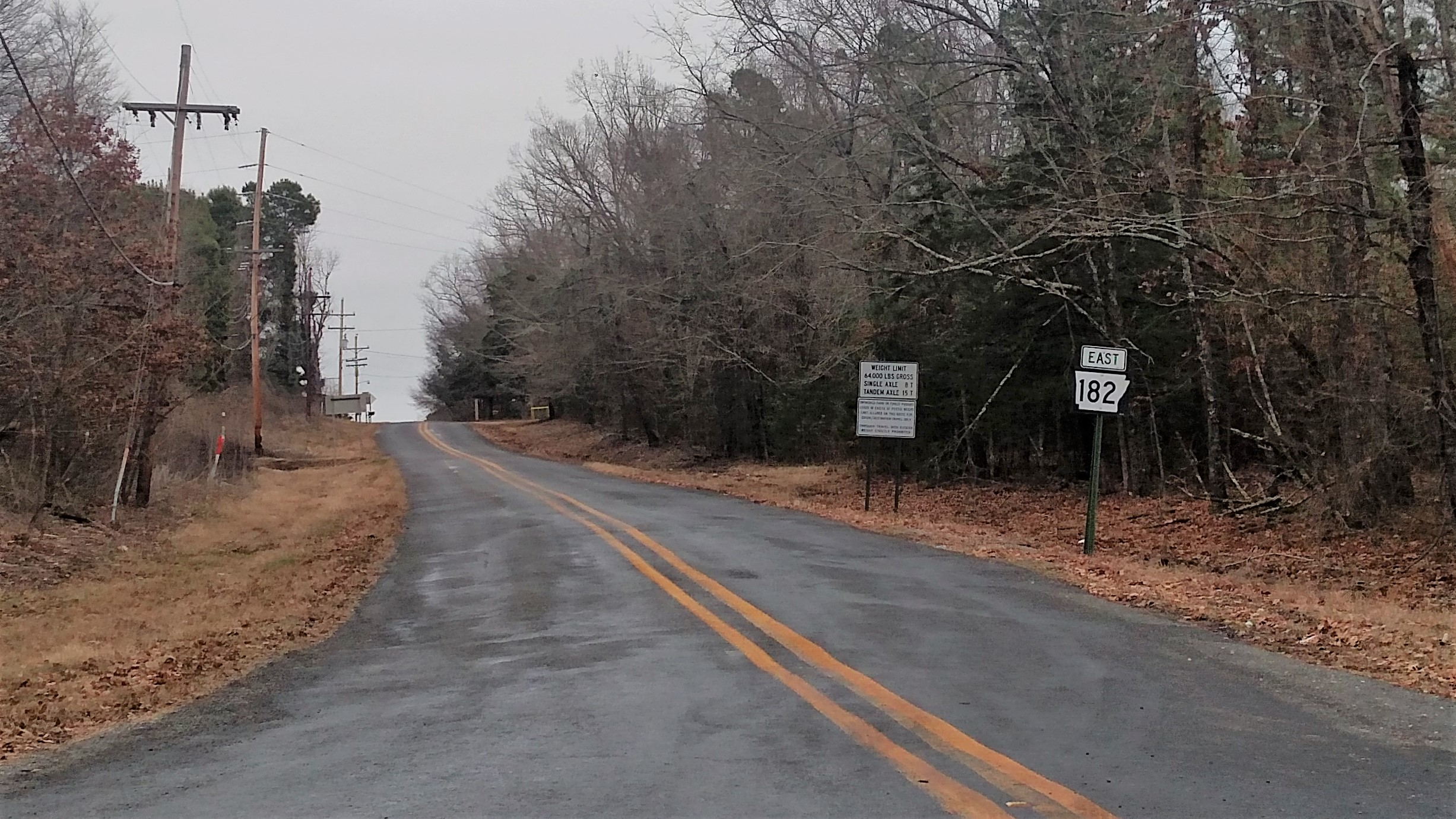
AR 182 eastbound near Okolona

AR 182 begins at AR 51 in Okolona. The route heads towards the southeast for about 12.4 miles (20.0 km) before reaching its eastern terminus at the concurrency of US 67 and AR 53 in Gurdon. The route itself does not intersect any other communities or highways, however, it does travel underneath Interstate 30 but does not intersect it.

== Major intersections ==
County	Location	mi	km	Destinations	Notes
Montgomery	Welsh	0.0	0.0	US 70 – Glenwood, Hot Springs	Western terminus
Clark	Amity	7.2	11.6	AR 84 to AR 8 – Kirby, Bismarck, Arkadelphia	Eastern terminus
Gap in route
Clark	Okolona	0.0	0.0	AR 51 – Arkadelphia	Western terminus
Clark	Gurdon	12.4	20.0	US 67 / AR 53 – Gurdon, Prescott, Arkadelphia	Eastern terminus
1.000 mi = 1.609 km; 1.000 km = 0.621 mi
