= Ouachita River Bridge (Arkadelphia, Arkansas) =

- Arkansas 7/51 Bridge
- U.S. National Register of Historic Places
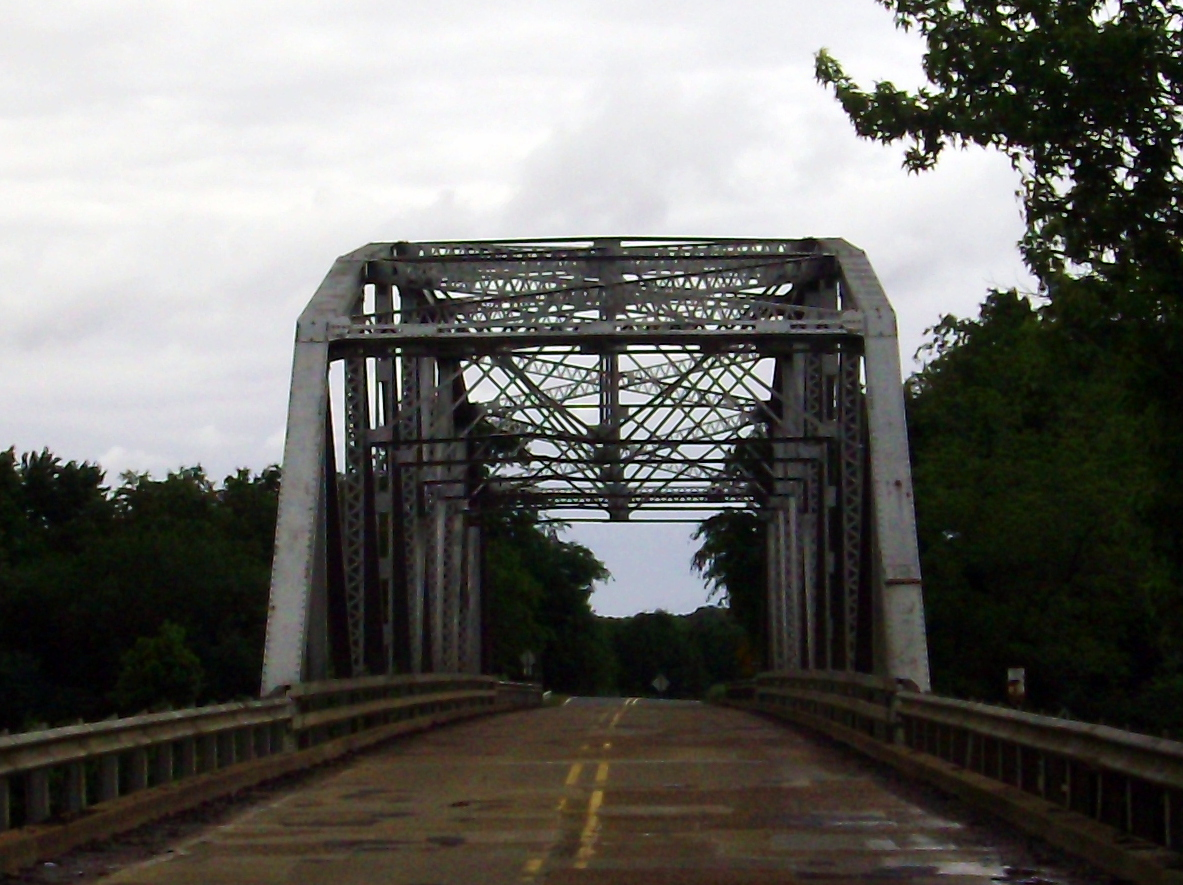

- Location within Arkansas Location within the United States
- Location: AR 7/51, Arkadelphia, Arkansas
- Coordinates: 34°7′23″N 93°2′47″W
- Area: less than one acre
- Built: 1933
- Built by: Luten Bridge Co.
- Architectural style: Parker truss
- MPS: Arkansas Highway History and Architecture MPS
- NRHP reference No.: 05001591
- Added to NRHP: February 1, 2006

The Ouachita River Bridge is a steel Parker through truss bridge carrying Arkansas Highway 7 and Arkansas Highway 51 across the Ouachita River at Arkadelphia, Arkansas. The trusses of the bridge were manufactured in 1933 by the Luten Bridge Company, and were first used to carry Highways 7 and US 67 over the Caddo River. That bridge was disassembled in the 1950s, and the trusses were stored until used to build this bridge in 1960. The main trusses span 202 feet (62 m), while the approaches combined measure 301 feet (92 m), giving the bridge a total length of 503 feet (153 m). The deck is concrete laid on steel girders and is 24 feet (7.3 m) wide. It is one of two crossings of the Ouachita River in Clark County.

The bridge was listed on the National Register of Historic Places in 2006. It is scheduled to be replaced in late 2018.

== See also ==
- National Register of Historic Places listings in Clark County, Arkansas
- List of bridges on the National Register of Historic Places in Arkansas
