= Ozan Lumber Company =

- Headquarters: United States

The Ozan Lumber Company was a major timber company based in Nevada and Clark County, Arkansas, eventually operating several mills and owning extensive timberlands. It was founded and owned by the Bemis family of Arkansas during the early 20th century, and was prominent during the 1930s and the Great Depression. The family company established a practice of replanting to create sustainable forests.

== Origins and expansion ==
Texas businessmen J.H. Bemis and his cousin Benjamin Whitaker opened a mill in Prescott, Arkansas, calling it the Ozan Lumber Company. Bemis had moved to Texas from New York. One of his four sons, Horace Erastus Bemis (H.E.), who died in 1914, had purchased the Prescott and Northwestern Railroad. It played a vital part in transporting the timber and company supplies, supporting a vertical integration of the company.

H.E. Bemis operated the mill in partnership with his brothers, J.W. Bemis and William N. Bemis. It achieved its greatest success under direction by James Rosborough Bemis, known as J.R. Bemis, who was William's son. Over the course of the next decade the mill became extremely profitable. By the early 20th century, Benjamin Whitaker was no longer a part of the mills operations, having sold out to J.H. Bemis, the primary stock holder for the company.

Around the turn of the century, mill towns were developing all around Arkansas, most notably Graysonia, in Clark County, to harvest the pine forests. In December 1915, the Bemis brothers merged their company with the Grayson-McLeod Company, founders of Graysonia. By that time the logging camp had developed to a town of more than 1,000 people, with a movie theater, three hotels, numerous restaurants and cafes, a school and a church. With the merger, they renamed the company as Ozan-Graysonia Lumber Company.

J.H. Bemis died in 1918, leaving his sons to run the company. W.N. Bemis and J.W. Bemis were the main share holders, and both had been active in the company since its beginnings. In 1919, J.R. Bemis, son of W.N. Bemis, moved to Graysonia to learn the lumber business. He was twenty years old. He remained in Graysonia until July 1920, when he traveled to St. Louis, Missouri and began working with Don Lambert, learning how the lumber sales business worked from the standpoint of working off commission. By 1921, J.R. Bemis had returned to Prescott, Arkansas.

J.W. Bemis died in 1922, leaving William and his son J.R. as the only remaining Bemis family share holders. J.R. took over the management of the Ozan Lumber Company, while his father opened a wholesale lumber business in St. Louis. In 1929, J.R. and his cousin Hubert Whitaker opened a wholesale lumber business in Prescott, with J.R. managing the production and Whitaker handling the sales. The Ozan Lumber Company by this time was operating in Whelen Springs, in Clark County. Although the Great Depression had begun, the Ozan Lumber Company continued to operate, providing employment in that area.

== J.R. Bemis takes over ==
In 1935, W.N. Bemis died, leaving J.R. as the main share holder for the company. In 1936, the mill in Prescott burned. At the time, the company was building another mill in Delight, Arkansas, but progress was slowed by the loss of the operating one. In January, 1937, the Delight mill was completed, behind schedule. In 1939, the Whelen Springs mill was closed, with J.R. Bemis opening another mill in Rosboro, Arkansas. Thomas Rosborough had closed down his operations there and moved his company, Caddo River Timber, to Springfield, Oregon. Rosborough's company, Rosboro Lumber, is today one of the largest private timber holders in the Pacific Northwest.

J.R. Bemis used his new Rosboro mill to supply the Delight mill, via the Missouri Pacific Railroad. By then Bemis had the Prescott mill back in operation, the Delight mill was running full force, and his Rosboro mill was feeding Delight.

Ovan Lumber Company and Ozan-Graysonia Lumber Company had been two separate companies since the 1920s. However, they were merged after W.N. Bemis' death. Through this merger, J.R. Bemis acquired mills in Hope, Prescott, Arkadelphia and Nashville, Arkansas, as well as more than 52,000 acres (210 km^{2}) of timberland. D.K. Bemis, a cousin to J.R., had begun handling the land and timber operations in 1935.

He provided for the long-term operations of the company, by constantly having their areas replanted following the timber being cut. Using the companies Chief Forester, T.R. Moberg, the company began selective harvesting. D.K. Bemis pioneered the school forest idea, which is now widespread. Beginning in the late 1930s, school children were asked to assist in the replanting of trees, as a part of their school's education program. By the 1950s many of these children would see at least one cutting of the timber they planted.

Due to this modern thinking, the company thrived. Companies of the past had cut over all virgin timber, then moved on to another location. By replanting and selective harvesting, the Ozan Lumber Company created sustainable forests. By 1956 the company owned 132,000 acres (530 km^{2}) of timberland.

In March 1952, the mill at Delight burned, resulting in the Rosboro mill being placed on a two-shift schedule to pick up the slack. In October, 1952, the company leased a mill in Antoine, Arkansas, and by November 1953, the second shift at Rosboro's mill was discontinued. Ozan Lumber Company also ventured into the automotive industry, managing the Smackover Motor Company and the Prescott Motor Company. The company sold out to Potlatch Corporation in 1965. J.R. Bemis died on March 16, 2000.
