= Gurdon School District =

School district in Arkansas, United States

Address
- 1 Go-Devil Road Gurdon, Arkansas, 71743; United States

District information
- Type: Public
- Grades: PreK–12
- NCES District ID: 0507110

Students and staff
- Students: 721
- Teachers: 63.08
- Staff: 77.25
- Student–teacher ratio: 11.43

Other information
- Website: www.go-devils.net

Gurdon School District is a school district in Clark County, Arkansas, serving Gurdon. It operates three schools: Gurdon Primary School, Cabe Middle School, and Gurdon High School.

The district serves Gurdon, Okolona, and Whelen Springs.

The Okolona School District was dissolved on July 1, 1987; portions of the district were absorbed by the Gurdon School District.
