= Arkansas Highway 392 (1968–1977) =

Former state highway in Arkansas, United States

Highway 392

Route information
- Length: 0.22 mi (350 m)
- Existed: July 24, 1968–October 26, 1977

Major junctions
- From: US 67 in Gurdon
- To: End state maintenance

Location
- Country: United States
- State: Arkansas
- Counties: Clark

Highway system
- Arkansas Highway System; Interstate; US; State; Business; Spurs; Suffixed; Scenic; Heritage

Highway 392 (AR 392 and Hwy. 392) is a former east–west state highway in Clark County, Arkansas.

== History ==
It was created by the Arkansas State Highway Commission on July 24, 1968, to serve as industrial access for a plywood plant. It was removed from the state highway system on October 26, 1977, following the plant's closure.

== Major intersections ==
The entire route was in Clark County.

| Location | mi | km | Destinations | Notes |
|---|---|---|---|---|
| | 0.00 | 0.00 | US 67 | Eastern terminus |
| | 0.22 | 0.35 | End state maintenance | Western terminus |
1.000 mi = 1.609 km; 1.000 km = 0.621 mi
