= Okolona School District (Arkansas) =

Defunct school district in Arkansas, United States

Okolona School District was a school district in Clark and Pike counties in Arkansas, headquartered in Okolona. It was dissolved on July 1, 1987; portions of the district were absorbed by the Amity, Arkadelphia, Delight, and Gurdon school districts.
