= Arkansas Highway 48 =

State highway in Arkansas, United States

Highway 48

Route information
- Maintained by ArDOT
- Length: 14.53 mi (23.38 km)
- Existed: April 1, 1926–present

Major junctions
- West end: AR 9 near Carthage
- East end: US 167 at Ferindale

Location
- Country: United States
- State: Arkansas
- Counties: Dallas

Highway system
- Arkansas Highway System; Interstate; US; State; Business; Spurs; Suffixed; Scenic; Heritage
← AR 47	→ I-49

Highway 48 (AR 48, Ark. 48, and Hwy. 48) is an east–west state highway in Southwest Arkansas. The route of 14.53 miles (23.38 km) begins at Highway 9 south of Tulip and runs east to US Highway 167 (US 167) at Ferindale. The route is maintained by the Arkansas State Highway and Transportation Department (AHTD).

== Route description ==
The route begins in northern Dallas County south of Tulip and serves as a lightly-used connection between Highway 9 and US 167, two primary north-south highways in the region. Highway 48 begins at Highway and runs east to Carthage, where it intersects Highway 229, which heads south to Fordyce. Highway 48 and Highway 229 briefly concur eastward until Highway 229 turns north toward Leola. Heading east, the route leaves the city limits and runs through pine forests typical of the Arkansas Timberlands and the Hampton Springs Cemetery, listed on the National Register of Historic Places. Continuing east, Highway 48 terminates at an intersection with US 167 near the Grant County line.

== History ==
Highway 48 was created during the 1926 Arkansas state highway numbering as a route between State Road 9 and US 167. The route has not been altered since creation.

== Major intersections ==
The entire route is in Dallas County.

Location	mi	km	Destinations	Notes
	0.00	0.00	AR 9 – Camden, Hot Springs	Western terminus
Carthage	4.89	7.87	AR 229 south (North Main Street) / Oak Street – Fordyce	Western end of AR 229 concurrency
Carthage	5.29	8.51	AR 229 north – Leola	Eastern end of AR 229 concurrency
Ferindale	14.53	23.38	US 167 – Fordyce, Sheridan	Eastern terminus
1.000 mi = 1.609 km; 1.000 km = 0.621 mi: Concurrency terminus
