= Domestic Science Building (Arkadelphia, Arkansas) =

- U.S. National Register of Historic Places
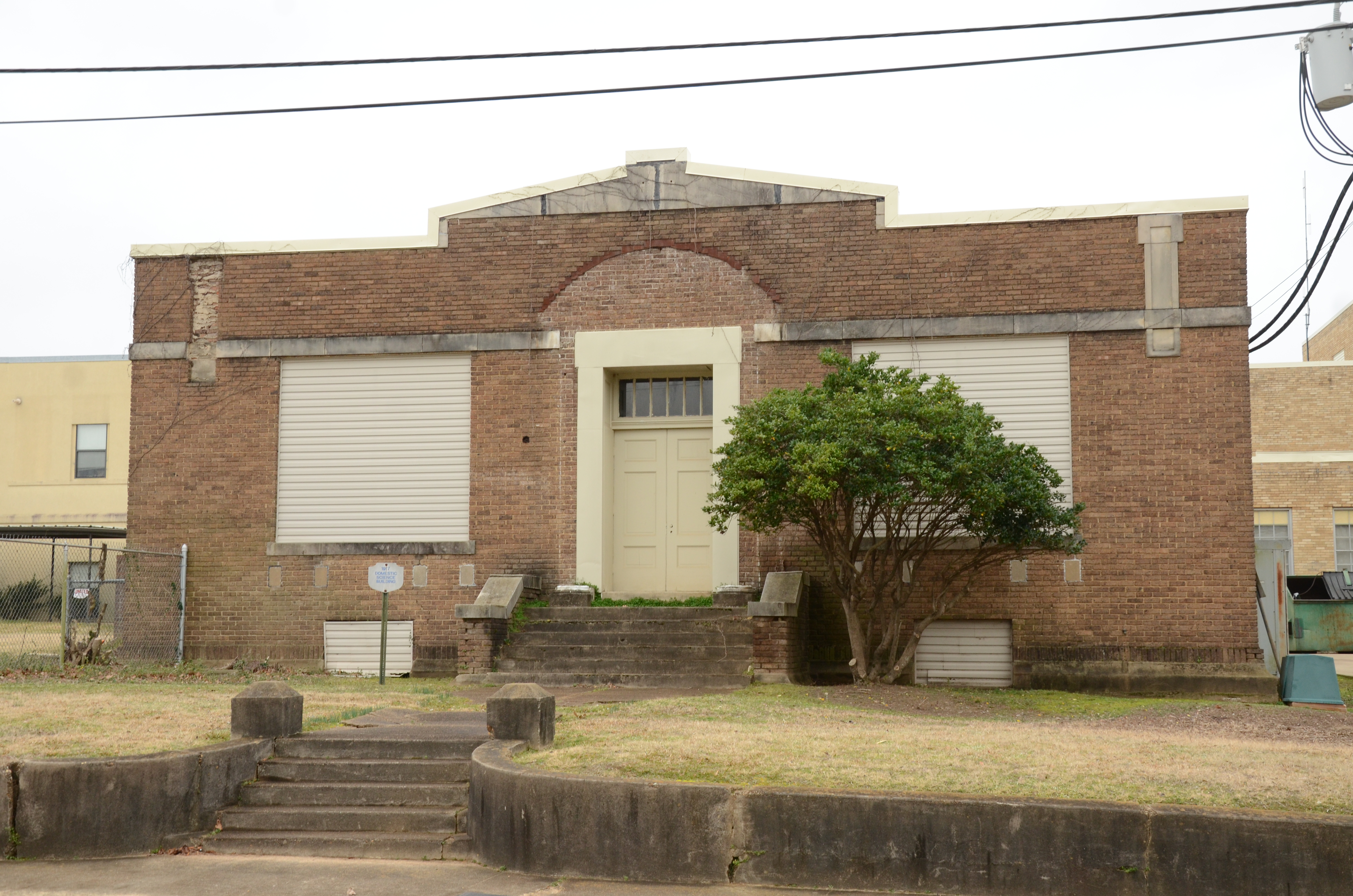

- Location within Arkansas Location within the United States
- Location: 11th and Haddock, Arkadelphia, Arkansas
- Coordinates: 34°6′19″N 93°3′35″W
- Area: less than one acre
- Built: 1917
- Architect: Thompson & Harding
- Architectural style: Colonial Revival
- MPS: Thompson, Charles L., Design Collection TR
- NRHP reference No.: 82000800
- Added to NRHP: December 22, 1982

The Domestic Science Building is a historic school building at 11th and Haddock in Arkadelphia, Arkansas. It was on the old campus of Arkadelphia High School, used for domestic science (home ec) courses until the 1980s. It is now unused, but remains the property of the Arkadelphia School District.

It is a single-story brick building, designed by Thompson & Harding and built in 1917. The building features an eclectic combination of Prairie Style and Colonial Revival elements; its geometric parapet is in the former style, and its columned entrance portico is stylistically the latter.

The building was listed on the U.S. National Register of Historic Places in 1982.

== See also ==
- Girls' Domestic Science and Arts Building-Arkansas Tech University, in Russellville, Arkansas, also NRHP-listed
- National Register of Historic Places listings in Clark County, Arkansas
