= Gurdon High School =

Location
- 7777 U.S. Highway 67 South; Gurdon, Arkansas 71743; United States
- Coordinates: 33°54′33″N 93°11′18″W

Information
- School type: Public (government funded)
- Status: Open
- School district: Gurdon School District
- NCES District ID: 0507110
- Authority: Arkansas Department of Education (ADE)
- CEEB code: 040969
- NCES School ID: 050711000430
- Teaching staff: 26.90 (on FTE basis)
- Grades: 9–12
- Enrollment: 251 (2023-2024)
- Student to teacher ratio: 9.33
- Education system: ADE Smart Core curriculum
- Classes offered: Regular, Advanced Placement
- Campus type: Rural
- Colors: Purple and gold
- Slogan: It's Great to be a Go-Devil
- Song: For ol’ Gurdon’s Honor
- Athletics: Football, golf, cross country, basketball, soccer, tennis, baseball, softball, track & field, cheer
- Athletics conference: 2A Region 7 (Football); 2A Region 7 East (Basketball)
- Mascot: Go-Devil
- Team name: Gurdon Go-Devils
- Accreditation: ADE; AdvancED (1930–)
- Communities served: Gurdon, Arkadelphia, Okolona, Whelen Springs
- Feeder schools: Cabe Middle School (grades 5–8)
- Affiliation: Arkansas Activities Association
- Website: www.go-devils.net/page/ghs

Gurdon High School is an accredited comprehensive public high school serving students in grades six through twelve in the rural community of Gurdon, Arkansas, United States. It is one of three public high schools in Clark County and serves the communities of Gurdon, Okolona, and Whelen Springs. With more than 200 students, it is the sole high school of the Gurdon School District.

== Academics ==
The school is accredited by the Arkansas Department of Education (ADE) and has been accredited by AdvancED since 1930. For the 2009–10 school year, Gurdon High School is rated by the ADE at Whole School Improvement - Achieving Year 2 in Adequate Yearly Progress.

The assumed course of study follows the Smart Core curriculum developed the Arkansas Department of Education (ADE), which requires students to complete at least 24 credit units before graduation. Students engage in regular (core) and career focus courses and exams and may select Advanced Placement (AP) coursework and exams that may lead to college credit.

== Athletics ==
The Gurdon High School mascot and athletic emblem is the Go-Devil with the school colors of purple and gold.

The Gurdon Go-Devils participate in various interscholastic activities in the 2A Classification within the 2A Region 7 (Football) Conference and 3A Region 7 (Basketball) Conference as administered by the Arkansas Activities Association. The Go-Devils school athletic activities include football, golf (boys/girls), cross country (boys/girls), basketball (boys/girls), soccer (boys/girls), baseball, softball, cheer, and track and field (boys/girls) Band.

== Notable alumni ==
- Justin Gonzales (Class of c. 2000), Republican member of the Arkansas House of Representatives for District 19, which includes Clark County
- Adrienne Nelson (Class of 1985), Associate Justice of the Oregon Supreme Court.
