= Arkansas Highway 229 =

State highway in Arkansas, United States

Highway 229

Route information
- Maintained by ArDOT
- Length: 57.61 mi (92.71 km)
- Existed: July 10, 1957–present

Major junctions
- South end: AR 8 in Fordyce
- US 270 in Poyen
- North end: I-30 / US 67 / US 70 in Benton

Location
- Country: United States
- State: Arkansas
- Counties: Dallas, Grant, Saline

Highway system
- Arkansas Highway System; Interstate; US; State; Business; Spurs; Suffixed; Scenic; Heritage
← AR 228	→ AR 230

Arkansas Highway 229 (AR 229) is a north–south state highway in Arkansas. The route runs 57.61 miles (92.71 km) from Highway 8 in Fordyce north to Interstate 30 (I-30) in Benton. The highway was created on July 10, 1957 during a period of highway system expansion, and extended throughout the 1960s. The route is maintained by the Arkansas Department of Transportation (ArDOT). A small portion of the route is designated as an Arkansas Heritage Trail for its use during the Civil War.

== Route description ==
Highway 229 connects Fordyce, a regional population center in South Arkansas with Benton, which is on the outskirts of Central Arkansas. However, it is less direct then US 167 between the cities. Traveling Highway 9 and Interstate 30 between the cities is also less direct than Highway 229, but both routes are estimated to have a shorter travel time than Highway 229 under normal conditions. (Note: Mileages from Fordyce to Benton are based on highway miles from the downtowns of the cities.) The route is a rural, two-lane road its entire length. Dallas and Grant counties are both within the Arkansas Timberlands region, known for silviculture, vast farms of tall pine trees, small towns, and sparse rural population.

The route begins at Highway 8 in Fordyce in the northwest corner of the city. The route runs north to a junction with Highway 273, which runs east to US 167. Highway 229 continues north to Bunn, where it curves into a straight alignment along an abandoned railroad line to Carthage. In Carthage, the highway passes the Bank of Carthage, which is listed on the National Register of Historic Places, and has a brief overlap with Highway 48. The route winds north to Cooney and enters Grant County.

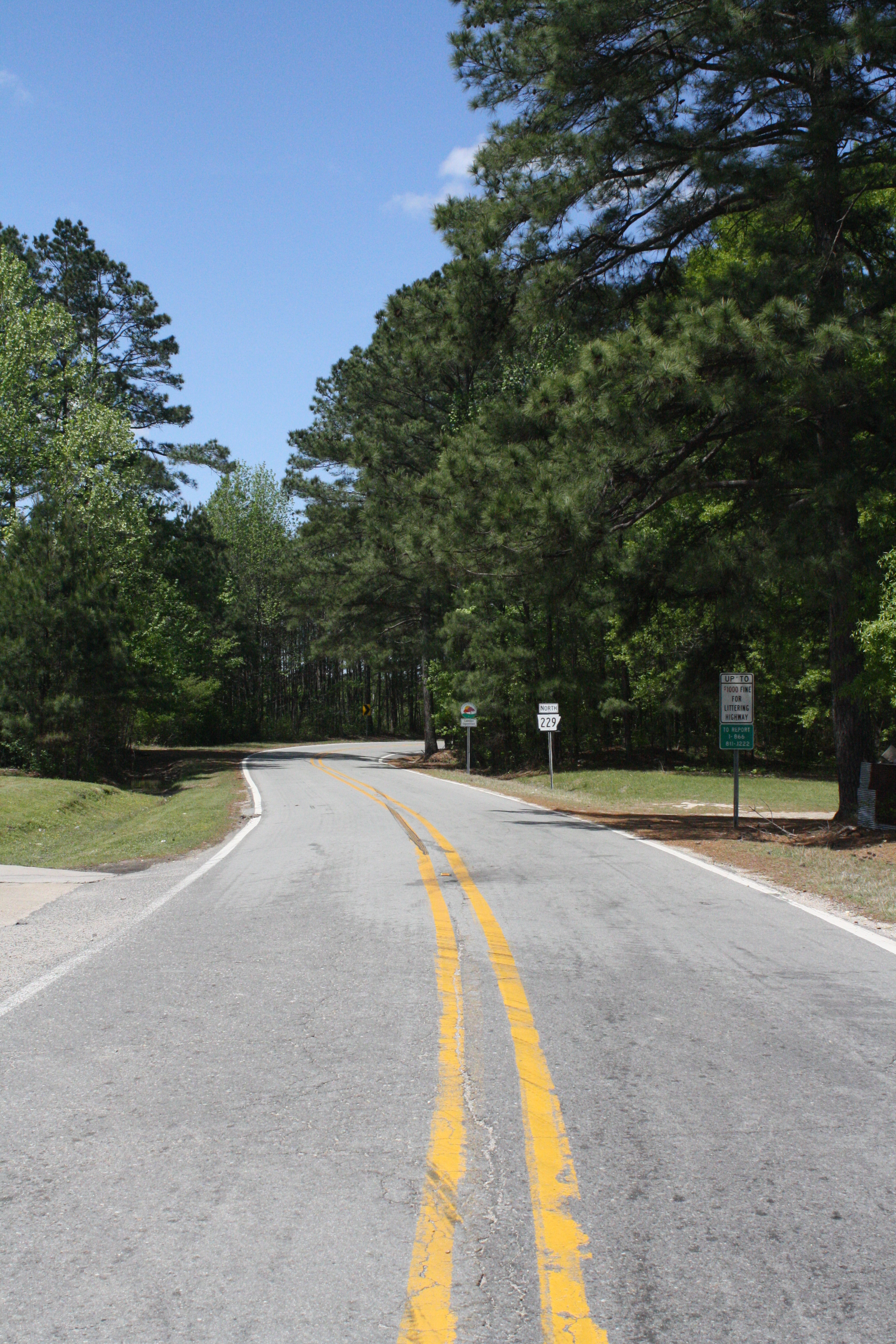
First reassurance marker for AR 229 west of AR 46 in Leola

Highway 229 runs north along the western side of Grant County, passing through Leola, where it has a brief concurrency with Highway 46. Northeast of Leola, Jenkins' Ferry Battleground State Park commemorates the Battle of Jenkins' Ferry during the Civil War. The highway runs north to Carvers, where it serves as the eastern terminus of Highway 222. Continuing north to Poyen Highway 229 intersects US 270, which gives access to Malvern to the west and Sheridan and Pine Bluff to the east. Highway 229 winds north through the communities of Fenter, Nydia, Traskwood, and Haskell. An overlap begins with US 67 in Haskell, which continues to I-30 in a discontinuous section of Benton. I-30 and US 67 concur to the north, with Highway 229 through a rural area until terminating at South Drive near the I-30/US 67 southbound frontage road.

== History ==
The route was designated by the Arkansas State Highway Commission on July 10, 1957, during a period of expansion in the state highway system. The Arkansas General Assembly passed the Act 148 of 1957, the Milum Road Act, creating 10–12 miles (16–19 km) of new state highways in each county.

The initial designation was from Carthage to US 67, and the route followed the Chicago, Rock Island and Pacific Railroad. Between Leola and Poyen, the designation supplanted Highway 113. It was extended south from Carthage to Hughes Trail in April 1963. The route was extended to the current southern terminus in November 1966. At the request of the Grant and Saline county judges, the former alignment of US 67 was designated as Highway 229 on August 30, 1995. In exchange, Highway 291 between Tull and Traskwood was removed from the state highway system and returned to county maintenance.

The segment of Highway 229 north of I-30 is an Arkansas Heritage Trail, used during the Civil War by Union General Frederick Steele to approach the Confederate States of America army in the Camden Expedition.

== Major intersections ==
County	Location	mi	km	Destinations	Notes
Dallas	Fordyce	0.00	0.00	AR 8 – Fordyce, Princeton	Southern terminus
Dallas		5.0	8.0	AR 273 east – Crossett, Strong	Western terminus of AR 273
Dallas	Carthage	19.59– 0.00	31.53– 0.00	AR 48 (Oak Street) – Farindale	
Grant	Leola	8.84– 0.00	14.23– 0.00	AR 46 (Main Street) – Sheridan	
Grant	Carvers	3.5	5.6	AR 222 west	Eastern terminus of AR 222
Grant	Poyen	11.2	18.0	US 270 (Third Street) – Sheridan, Malvern	
Saline	Haskell	27.04	43.52	US 67 south – Malvern, Benton	Southern end of US 67 concurrency
Saline	Benton	0.00	0.00	I-30 / US 67 north (US 70) – Benton, Little Rock, Texarkana	Northern end of US 67 concurrency; exit 114 on I-30
Saline	Benton	2.14	3.44	I-30 (US 67 / US 70) – Little Rock, Texarkana	Northern terminus; exit 116 on I-30
1.000 mi = 1.609 km; 1.000 km = 0.621 mi: Concurrency terminus
