= Arkadelphia High School =

Location
- 401 High School Drive; Arkadelphia, Arkansas 71923; United States
- 34°7′25″N 93°5′57″W

Information
- School type: Title I School
- Status: Open
- School district: Arkadelphia School District
- NCES District ID: 0502430
- Oversight: Arkansas Department of Education (ADE)
- CEEB code: 040035
- NCES School ID: 050243000018
- Teaching staff: 78.70 (on FTE basis)
- Grades: 9–12
- Enrollment: 574 (2023-2024)
- Student to teacher ratio: 7.29
- Education system: ADE Smart Core curriculum
- Classes offered: Regular, Advanced Placement
- Campus type: Rural
- Colors: Royal blue, red, and white
- Athletics conference: 4A 7 (2012-present
- Mascot: Badger
- Team name: Arkadelphia Badgers
- Accreditation: ADE
- National ranking: Challenge Index; No. 284; No. 4 (AR)
- Feeder schools: Goza Middle School
- Affiliation: Arkansas Activities Association (AAA)
- Website: arkadelphiaschools.org/o/ahs

Arkadelphia High School is a comprehensive public junior/senior high school serving grades nine through twelve in the rural, fringe community of Arkadelphia, Arkansas, United States. Located in Clark County, Arkadelphia High School is the largest of three public high schools in the county and is the sole high school managed by the Arkadelphia School District. The school has been recognized for its academic programs as a National Blue Ribbon School.

In addition to Arkadelphia, the district (and therefore the high school's attendance boundary) includes Caddo Valley and Gum Springs.

== Academics ==
=== Curriculum ===
The assumed course of study at Arkadelphia High School exceeds the Smart Core curriculum developed by the Arkansas Department of Education (ADE). Students engage in regular and Advanced Placement (AP) coursework and exams to obtain at least 26 units (graduating classes of 2012 and 2013) and 27 units (graduating classes of 2014 and 2015) beyond the 22 units required by the Smart Core curriculum. The Arkadelphia School District offers students regular or advanced diplomas, based on coursework and grade point average. Exceptional students have been recognized as National Merit Finalists and participated in Arkansas Governor's School. The school maintains a concurrent credit partnership with College of the Ouachitas community college, whereas students may receive high school and college credit simultaneously.

=== Awards and recognition ===
In 1990-91, Arkadelphia High School was honored as a National Blue Ribbon School by the U.S. Department of Education (ED) for the results of its academic programs. In 1991, Arkadelphia High School principal Herman Thomas was awarded the National Milken Educator Award.

Arkadelphia High School was nationally recognized in the Challenge Index report presented by the Washington Post, that measures the number of college-level tests given at the school divided by the number of graduates. In 2011, Arkadelphia had an index score of 1.033 and was ranked as the No. 29 school in Arkansas. In 2012, Arkadelphia's index score jumped to 3.412 and ranking as the No. 4 school in Arkansas and No. 284 in the United States.

In 2012, Arkadelphia School District and its high school were recognized in the AP District of the Year Awards program in the College Board's 3rd Annual Honor Roll that consisted of 539 U.S. public school districts (6 in Arkansas) that simultaneously achieved increases in access to AP® courses for a broader number of students and improved the rate at which their AP students earned scores of 3 or higher on an AP Exam.

== Athletics ==
The Arkadelphia High School mascot is the badger with royal blue, red, and white serving as the school colors.

For the 2012-2014 seasons, the Arkadelphia Badgers participate in the 4A 3 Conference. Competition is primarily sanctioned by the Arkansas Activities Association with the Badgers competing in baseball, basketball (boys/girls), cheer, cross country (boys/girls), football, golf (boys/girls), softball, tennis (boys/girls), track and field (boys/girls), and volleyball.

The Arkadelphia Badgers have won numerous state championships, including five football, seven volleyball, eight marching band, two baseball, three tennis, two track and field, one wrestling, one golf, and one swimming and diving. The 1987 Badgers football went undefeated at 14-0, won the 3A state football championship against the White Hall Bulldogs with a final score of 21-6, led by head coach John Outlaw and were ranked No. 21 in the nation by USA Today. The Badgers also won state championships in 1979, also back to back 4A state championships in 2017 and 2018 defeating Warren High School and Joe T. Robinson in the title games. The 2024 badger football team beat Elkins 28-0 in state.

== Notable people ==
- Fitz Hill, football coach, university president
