= Gum Springs, Arkansas =

- Town
- Location of Gum Springs in Clark County, Arkansas.
- Coordinates: 34°03′50″N 93°05′45″W
- Country: United States
- State: Arkansas
- County: Clark

Area
  - Total: 0.39 sq mi (1.01 km^{2})
  - Land: 0.39 sq mi (1.01 km^{2})
  - Water: 0 sq mi (0.00 km^{2})
- Elevation: 240 ft (73 m)

Population (2020)
  - Total: 91
  - Estimate (2025): 91
  - Density: 232.9/sq mi (89.94/km^{2})
- Time zone: UTC-6 (Central (CST))
  - Summer (DST): UTC-5 (CDT)
- ZIP code: 71923
- Area code: 870
- FIPS code: 05-29140
- GNIS feature ID: 2406628

Gum Springs is a town in Clark County, Arkansas, United States. As of the 2020 census, Gum Springs had a population of 91.

== Geography ==
Gum Springs is located northeast of the center of Clark County. U.S. Route 67 passes through the town, leading northeast 5 miles (8 km) to Arkadelphia, the county seat, and southwest 10 miles (16 km) to Gurdon. Interstate 30 passes northwest of the town, with access from Exit 69.

According to the United States Census Bureau, Gum Springs has a total area of 0.40 square miles (1.04 km^{2}), all land.

== Demographics ==
Historical population
Census	Pop.	Note	%±
1970	269		—
1980	255		−5.2%
1990	157		−38.4%
2000	194		23.6%
2010	120		−38.1%
2020	91		−24.2%
2025 (est.)	91	Steady	0.0%
U.S. Decennial Census

=== 2020 census ===
Gum Springs town, Arkansas – Racial and ethnic composition Note: the US Census treats Hispanic/Latino as an ethnic category. This table excludes Latinos from the racial categories and assigns them to a separate category. Hispanics/Latinos may be of any race.
Race / Ethnicity (NH = Non-Hispanic)	Pop 2000	Pop 2010	Pop 2020	% 2000	% 2010	% 2020
White alone (NH)	78	49	34	40.21%	40.93%	37.36%
Black or African American alone (NH)	107	64	47	55.15%	53.33%	51.65%
Native American or Alaska Native alone (NH)	0	0	0	0.00%	0.00%	0.00%
Asian alone (NH)	0	0	0	0.00%	0.00%	0.00%
Pacific Islander alone (NH)	0	0	0	0.00%	0.00%	0.00%
Other Race alone (NH)	0	0	0	0.00%	0.00%	0.00%
Mixed race or Multiracial (NH)	0	1	1	0.00%	0.83%	1.10%
Hispanic or Latino (any race)	9	6	9	4.64%	5.00%	9.89%
Total	194	120	91	100.00%	100.00%	100.00%

As of the census of 2000, there were 194 people, 87 households, and 54 families residing in the town. The population density was 187.3 people/km^{2} (485 people/mi^{2}). There were 100 housing units at an average density of 96.5 units/km^{2} (250 units/mi^{2}). The racial makeup of the town was 44.85% White and 55.15% Black or African American. 4.64% of the population were Hispanic or Latino of any race.

There were 87 households, out of which 21.8% had children under the age of 18 living with them, 44.8% were married couples living together, 16.1% had a female householder with no husband present, and 36.8% were non-families. 29.9% of all households were made up of individuals, and 12.6% had someone living alone who was 65 years of age or older. The average household size was 2.23 and the average family size was 2.69.

In the town, the population was spread out, with 19.1% under the age of 18, 9.3% from 18 to 24, 26.3% from 25 to 44, 27.3% from 45 to 64, and 18.0% who were 65 years of age or older. The median age was 42 years. For every 100 females, there were 110.9 males. For every 100 females age 18 and over, there were 101.3 males.

The median income for a household in the town was $31,000, and the median income for a family was $34,167. Males had a median income of $19,375 versus $16,875 for females. The per capita income for the town was $13,404. About 14.3% of families and 17.3% of the population were below the poverty line, including 14.3% of those under the age of eighteen and 29.1% of those 65 or over.

== Education ==
It is within the Arkadelphia School District, which operates Arkadelphia High School.
