= Beirne, Arkansas =

- Census-designated place
- Interactive map of Beirne, Arkansas
- Coordinates: 33°53′18″N 93°12′22″W
- Country: United States
- State: Arkansas
- County: Clark
- Settled: 1880
- Founder: James Lewis Beirne
- Named for: James Lewis Beirne
- Elevation: 226 ft (69 m)

Population (2020)
  - Total: 36
- Time zone: UTC-6 (Central (CST))
  - Summer (DST): UTC-5 (CDT)
- ZIP code: 71721
- Area code: 870
- GNIS feature ID: 2805622

Beirne is an unincorporated community and census-designated place (CDP) in southern Clark County, Arkansas, United States. It was first listed as a CDP in the 2020 census with a population of 36.

It is located southwest of Gurdon.

== History ==
Beirne was first settled in 1880 by James Lewis Beirne of Grafton, Illinois on 800 acres (3.2 km^{2}) that he had purchased. Within a year there was a planing mill and a store, along with a railroad depot to serve the area.

In 1890 the community was known alternately as Beirne or Beirne Station.

By 1897, Beirne had at least two saw mills that made lumber for furniture and other uses.

Lumber is still the main industry in Beirne, with Anthony Timberlands having their hardwood operation there.

== Transportation ==
State Highway 51 passes north–south through the Beirne.

For rail freight Beirne is served by the Union Pacific Railroad, which passes through the community and has a spur into the Anthony Timberlands lumber mill.

== Demographics ==
Historical population
Census	Pop.	Note	%±
2020	36		—
U.S. Decennial Census; 2020

=== 2020 census ===
Beirne CDP, Arkansas – Racial and ethnic composition Note: the US Census treats Hispanic/Latino as an ethnic category. This table excludes Latinos from the racial categories and assigns them to a separate category. Hispanics/Latinos may be of any race.
Race / Ethnicity (NH = Non-Hispanic)	Pop 2020	% 2020
White alone (NH)	33	91.67%
Black or African American alone (NH)	1	2.78%
Native American or Alaska Native alone (NH)	0	0.00%
Asian alone (NH)	0	0.00%
Pacific Islander alone (NH)	0	0.00%
Some Other Race alone (NH)	0	0.00%
Mixed Race or Multi-Racial (NH)	1	2.78%
Hispanic or Latino (any race)	1	2.78%
Total	36	100.00%
