= Mauldin, Arkansas =

Ghost Town in Arkansas, U.S.

Coordinates: 34°35′38″N 93°39′58″W

Mauldin or Mauldin Logging Camp is a ghost town in Montgomery County, Arkansas, United States. It is classified as a populated place. Established in 1918 by Billy Mauldin in cooperation with Thomas Rosborough, it became heavily populated by 1922 by workers drawn to industries cutting and processing virgin timber in the area. It was located between Mount Ida and Pencil Bluff.

== History ==
William W. Mauldin, known as Billy Mauldin, was born in Greer County, Texas, and in 1906 had homesteaded 160 acres (0.65 km^{2}) where Mauldin would later be located. Billy Mauldin worked in cooperation with Thomas Whitaker "Whit" Rosborough, who had formed the Caddo River Timber Company in 1906, when he started the town of Rosboro, in Pike County. The town of Mauldin first began heavy production of timber in 1922. It was, like Graysonia, Arkansas, a "company-owned town", but did have a post office, school, church, and a large number of shotgun houses, along with business offices. The Caddo River Lumber Company built a railroad line from Womble (now Norman, Arkansas) to Mauldin, through the Gaston Settlement. The pine timber was shipped via train to mills in Glenwood and Rosboro, the latter of which was Rosborough's main mill.

For a time the town thrived. But the company, functioning on a "cut and move" theory, packed up and disassembled the entire town almost overnight, in 1933, having cut all the virgin timber in the immediate area. The town had two 1-acre (4,000 m^{2}) ponds used to float logs. The ponds still exist today, located just outside Mount Ida on US Highway 270. Nothing remains today short of a few concrete blocks where the mill once stood, and the two ponds. Both ponds were turned into a fish hatchery in 1940. There is a vacant field to the side of the ponds where the town once stood. All the larger buildings were torn down, while the smaller ones were moved to a new site near Forester, in Scott County.

The Caddo River Lumber Company later sold the majority of the land they owned there to the US Forest Service. In 1939 Thomas Rosborough moved his entire operation to the northwest, settling in Springfield, Oregon, and taking with him large numbers of loyal employees. Today his company, called "Rosboro", is one of the only fully integrated timber operators in the United States. It is also one of the largest private timberland holders of the Pacific Northwest.
