= Bank of Carthage (Arkansas) =

- U.S. National Register of Historic Places
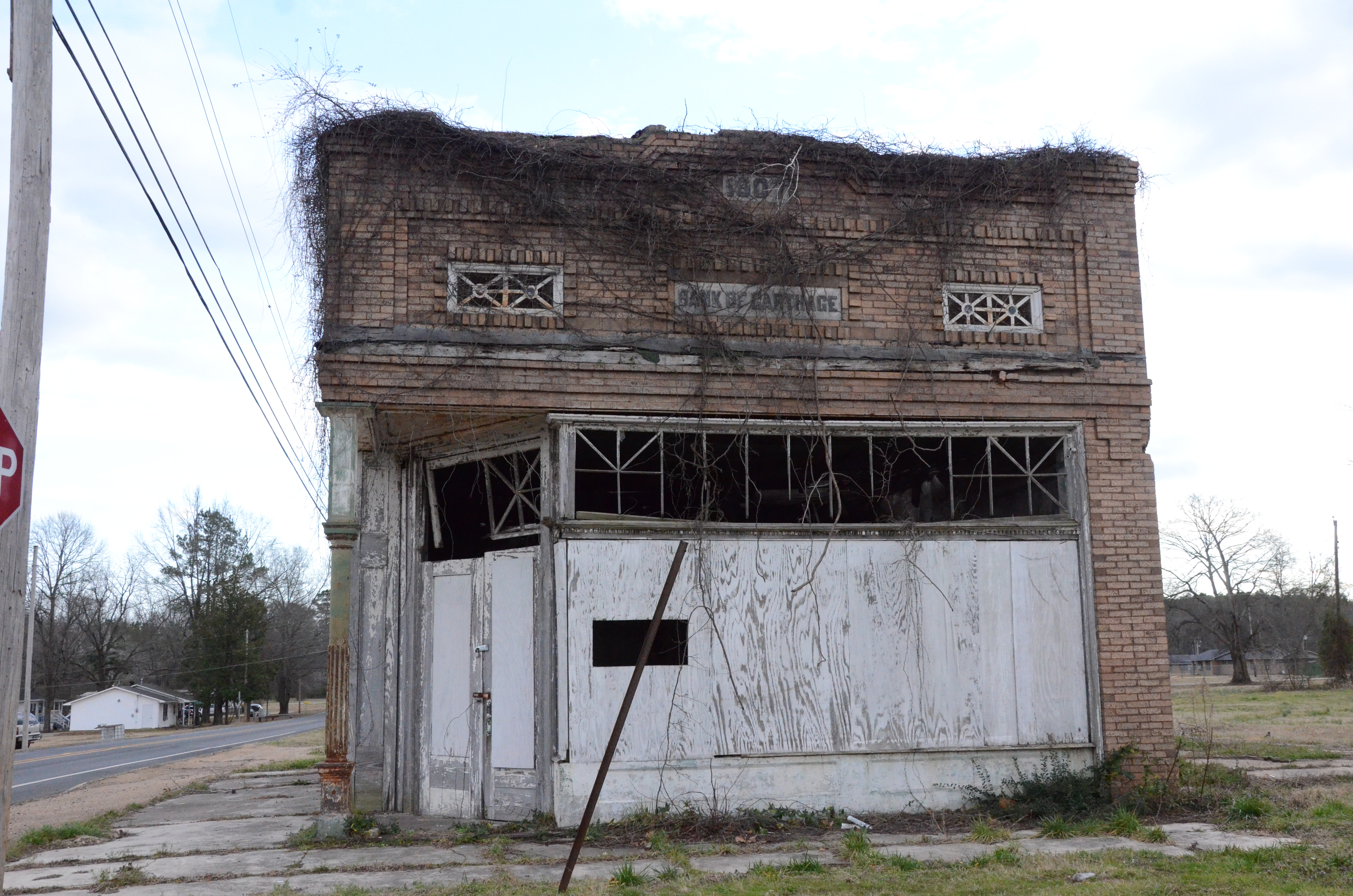

- Location within Arkansas Location within the United States
- Location: AR 229, Carthage, Arkansas
- Coordinates: 34°4′27″N 92°33′16″W
- Area: less than one acre
- Built: 1907
- Architect: Charles L. Thompson
- Architectural style: Classical Revival
- MPS: Thompson, Charles L., Design Collection TR
- NRHP reference No.: 82000806
- Added to NRHP: December 22, 1982

The Bank of Carthage is a historic bank building at the junction of Arkansas Highway 229 and West Kelly Avenue in Carthage, Arkansas. The single-story brick building was designed by Charles L. Thompson in Classical Revival style and built in 1907. It is the only period commercial building in the small town. It is built out of salmon-colored brick, with a low parapet on its main facade. The entrance is located in a diagonal cutout from one of its corners.

The building was listed on the National Register of Historic Places in 1982 for its architecture.

== See also ==
- National Register of Historic Places listings in Dallas County, Arkansas
