= Arkansas Highway 222 =

State highway in Arkansas, United States

Highway 222
- AR 222 highlighted in red

Route information
- Maintained by AHTD
- Length: 17.64 mi (28.39 km)

Major junctions
- West end: AR 51
- AR 9, Lono
- East end: AR 229, Carvers

Location
- Country: United States
- State: Arkansas
- Counties: Grant, Hot Springs

Highway system
- Arkansas Highway System; Interstate; US; State; Business; Spurs; Suffixed; Scenic; Heritage
← AR 221	→ AR 223

Arkansas Highway 222 (AR 222 and Hwy. 222) is an east–west state highway in Arkansas. The route of 17.64 miles (28.39 km) runs from AR 51 near Donaldson east through Lono to AR 229. The route is two–lane, undivided.

== Route description ==
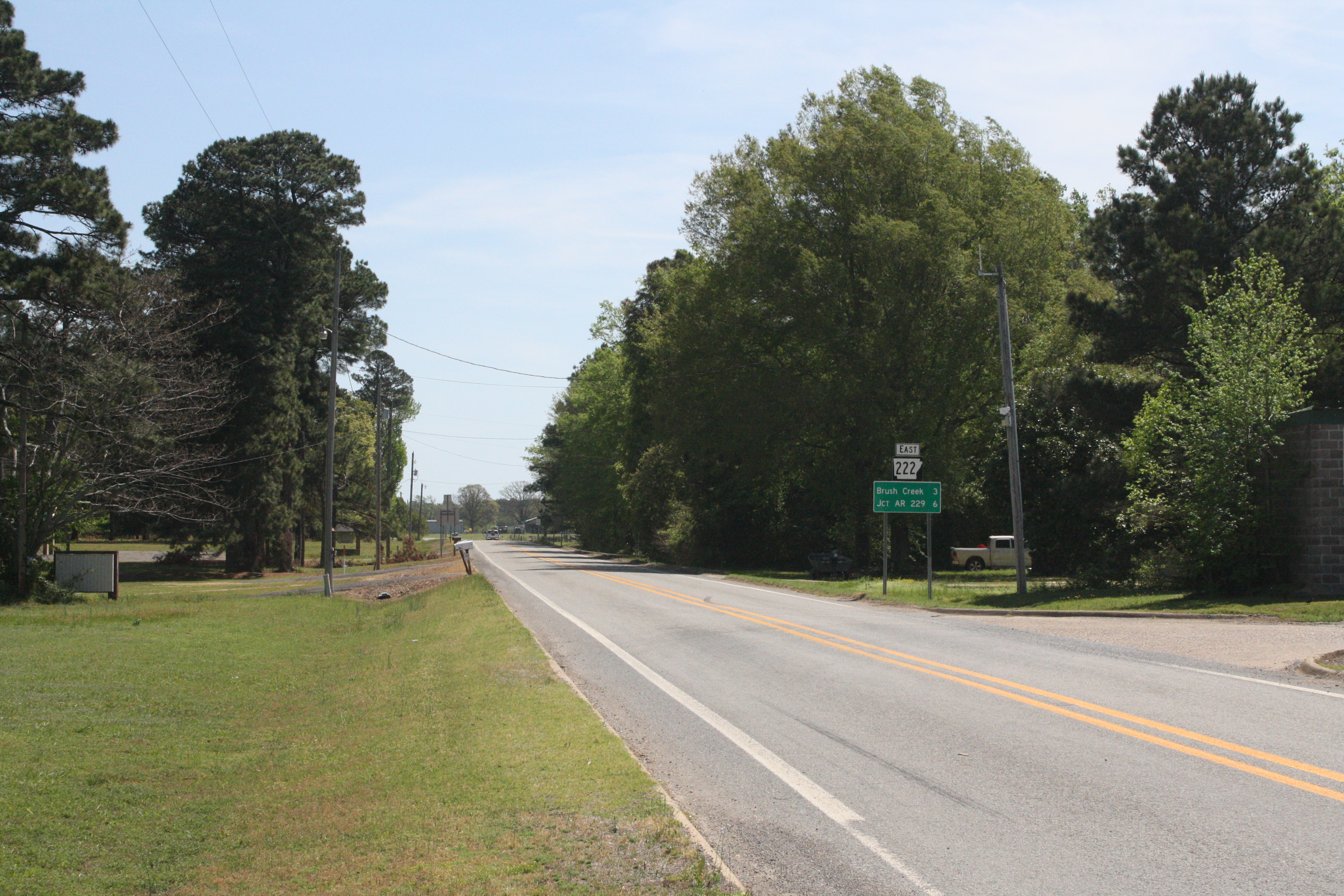
First reassurance marker for AR 222 at Lono

Highway 222 begins at Highway 51 near Donaldson in Hot Spring County. The route runs through Rolla to intersect Highway 9 in Lono. The route continues further east to enter Grant County, when the route meets Highway 229 in Carvers and terminates. The route was partially paved in 1991.

== Major intersections ==
County	Location	mi	km	Destinations	Notes
Hot Spring		0.0	0.0	AR 51 – Donaldson, Joan, Arkadelphia	Western terminus
Hot Spring	Lono	11.55	18.59	AR 9 – Malvern, Tulip	
Grant	Carvers	17.64	28.39	AR 229	Eastern terminus
1.000 mi = 1.609 km; 1.000 km = 0.621 mi
