= Arkadelphia School District =

School district in Arkansas

Arkadelphia Public School District is a public school district located in Arkadelphia, Arkansas, United States. The school district supports families with education facilities and educators from early childhood through secondary education.

In addition to Arkadelphia, the district includes Caddo Valley and Gum Springs.

In 2012, Arkadelphia Public School District and its high school were recognized in the AP District of the Year Awards program in the College Board's 3rd Annual Honor Roll that consisted of 539 U.S. public school districts (6 in Arkansas) that simultaneously achieved increases in access to AP courses for a broader number of students and improved the rate at which their AP students earned scores of 3 or higher on an AP Exam.

== History ==
The Okolona School District was dissolved on July 1, 1987; portions of the district were absorbed by Arkadelphia School District.

The Domestic Science Building is a historic site (though closed) belonging to the district.

== Schools ==
Schools include:

- Arkadelphia High School—serving students in grades 9–12. Honored as a National Blue Ribbon School in 1990–91.
- L. M. Goza Middle School—serving students in grades 6–8.
- J. Ed Peake Elementary School—serving students in grades 4–5.
- Central Primary School—serving students in grades 2—3
- Louisa E. Perritt Primary School—serving students in grades PreKindergarten–1. Honored as a National Blue Ribbon School in 1987–88.
- Early Childhood Center—serving students ages 6 weeks to 4 years.
