= Whelen Springs, Arkansas =

- Town
- Location of Whelen Springs in Clark County, Arkansas.
- Coordinates: 33°49′59″N 93°07′29″W
- Country: United States
- State: Arkansas
- County: Clark

Area
  - Total: 0.24 sq mi (0.61 km^{2})
  - Land: 0.24 sq mi (0.61 km^{2})
  - Water: 0 sq mi (0.00 km^{2})
- Elevation: 253 ft (77 m)

Population (2020)
  - Total: 47
  - Estimate (2025): 47
  - Density: 200.8/sq mi (77.53/km^{2})
- Time zone: UTC-6 (Central (CST))
  - Summer (DST): UTC-5 (CDT)
- ZIP code: 71772
- Area code: 870
- FIPS code: 05-74930
- GNIS feature ID: 2406873

Whelen Springs is a town in Clark County, Arkansas, United States. As of the 2020 census, Whelen Springs had a population of 47. From 1930 through 1939 the town thrived, being a main hub of operations for the then powerful Ozan Lumber Company.

== Geography ==
Whelen Springs is located in southern Clark County approximately 1 mile (1.6 km) north of the Little Missouri River. Arkansas Highway 53 passes through the town, leading north 6 miles (10 km) to Gurdon and south 10 miles (16 km) to Bluff City, via Highway 24.

According to the United States Census Bureau, Whelen Springs has a total area of 0.24 square miles (0.62 km^{2}), all land.

== Demographics ==
Historical population
Census	Pop.	Note	%±
1920	137		—
1930	194		41.6%
1940	214		10.3%
1950	192		−10.3%
1960	155		−19.3%
1970	126		−18.7%
1980	156		23.8%
1990	116		−25.6%
2000	84		−27.6%
2010	92		9.5%
2020	47		−48.9%
2025 (est.)	47	Steady	0.0%
U.S. Decennial Census

As of the census of 2000, there were 84 people, 41 households, and 25 families residing in the town. The population density was 141.0/km^{2} (368.6/mi^{2}). There were 47 housing units at an average density of 78.9/km^{2} (206.3/mi^{2}). The racial makeup of the town was 94.05% White, 4.76% Black or African American, and 1.19% from two or more races.

There were 41 households, out of which 26.8% had children under the age of 18 living with them, 56.1% were married couples living together, 2.4% had a female householder with no husband present, and 39.0% were non-families. 36.6% of all households were made up of individuals, and 22.0% had someone living alone who was 65 years of age or older. The average household size was 2.05 and the average family size was 2.60.

In the town, the population was spread out, with 14.3% under the age of 18, 9.5% from 18 to 24, 31.0% from 25 to 44, 27.4% from 45 to 64, and 17.9% who were 65 years of age or older. The median age was 43 years. For every 100 females, there were 127.0 males. For every 100 females age 18 and over, there were 118.2 males.

The median income for a household in the town was $19,286, and the median income for a family was $19,792. Males had a median income of $24,688 versus $16,500 for females. The per capita income for the town was $10,852. There were 18.5% of families and 13.5% of the population living below the poverty line, including 22.2% of under eighteens and 13.0% of those over 64.

== Education ==
The Gurdon School District, which operates Gurdon High School, serves the community.
