= Okolona Colored High School Gymnasium =

- U.S. National Register of Historic Places
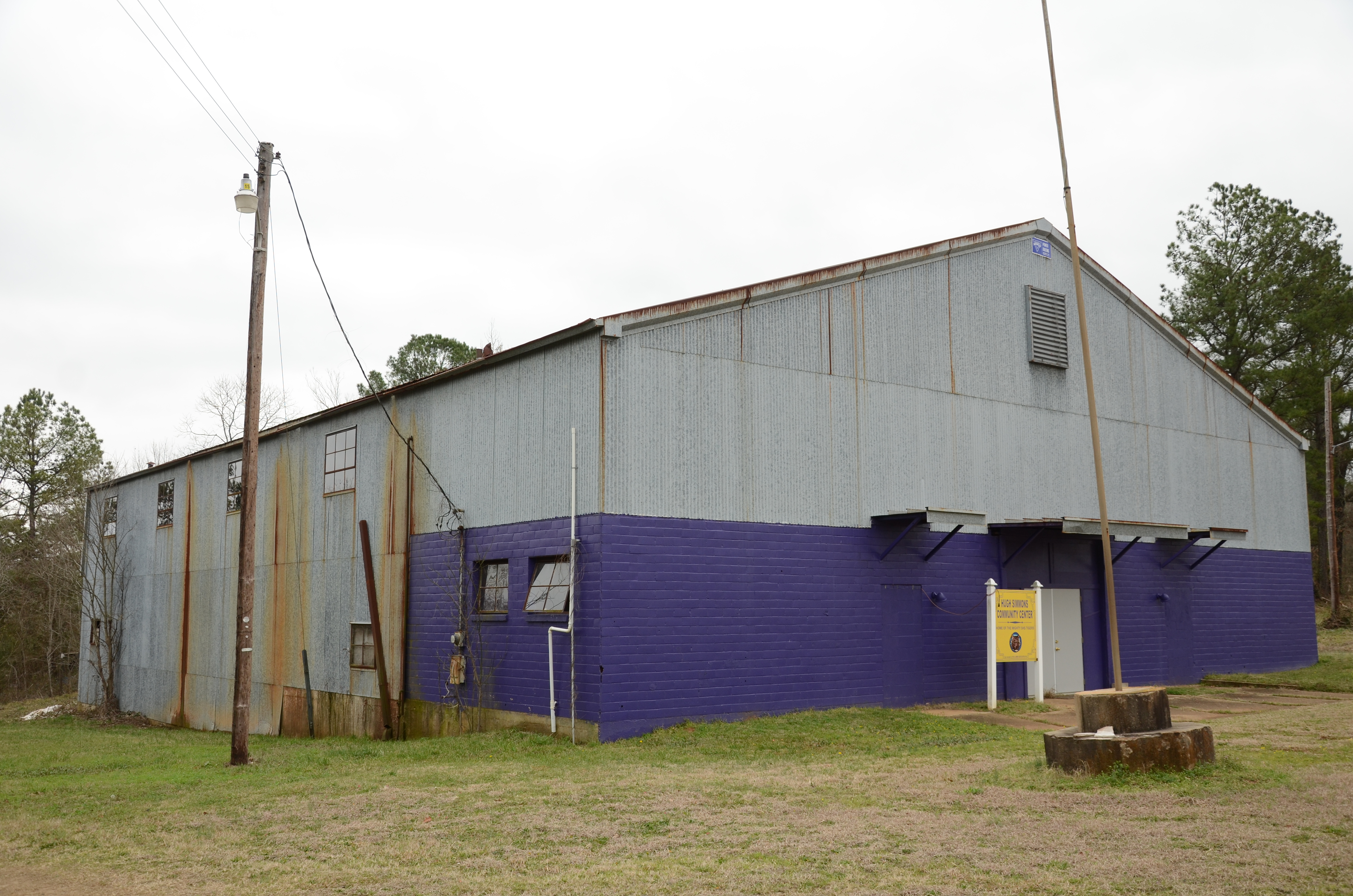

- Location within Arkansas Location within the United States
- Location: 767 Layne Street, Okolona, Arkansas
- Coordinates: 33°59′35″N 93°20′23″W
- Area: 1.5 acres (0.61 ha)
- Built: c. 1950
- NRHP reference No.: 11000686
- Added to NRHP: September 23, 2011

The Okolona Colored High School Gymnasium is a historic academic athletic building at 767 Layne Street in Okolona, Arkansas. It is the only surviving building of a school campus built c. 1950 to provide schooling to local African-American students. The building is a large rectangular structure with no significant stylistic elements. Its walls are primarily corrugated metal, although a portion of the front and sides near the front are composed of clay tile blocks. The campus it was a part of began in 1928 with a modest two-room school building constructed with supported from the Rosenwald Fund, and grew over the years to include vocational and home economics facilities, in addition to a cafeteria and additional classrooms. The gymnasium was designed to serve as a multi-function athletic facility and meeting space for the local African-American community. The Okolona schools were consolidated with those of neighboring Simmons, and all of the other buildings of this campus were demolished in the 1970s and 1980s.

The building was listed on the National Register of Historic Places in 2011.

== See also ==
- National Register of Historic Places listings in Clark County, Arkansas
