= Caddo Valley, Arkansas =

- Town
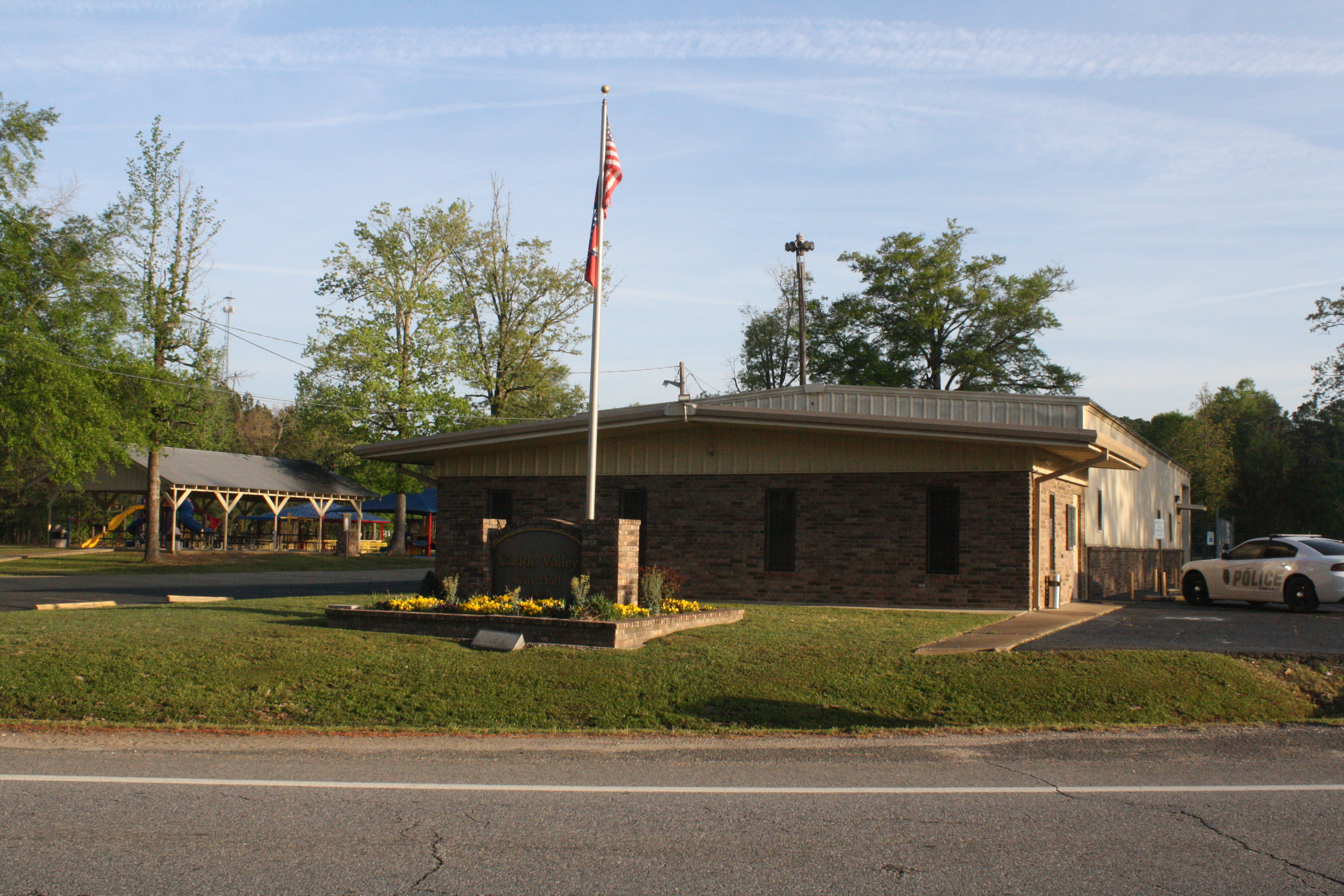
- Caddo Vally City Hall

- Location of Caddo Valley in Clark County, Arkansas.
- Coordinates: 34°11′49″N 93°02′56″W
- Country: United States
- State: Arkansas
- County: Clark

Area
  - Total: 3.11 sq mi (8.06 km^{2})
  - Land: 3.10 sq mi (8.02 km^{2})
  - Water: 0.012 sq mi (0.03 km^{2})
- Elevation: 279 ft (85 m)

Population (2020)
  - Total: 595
  - Estimate (2025): 588 ▼
  - Density: 192.0/sq mi (74.15/km^{2})
- Time zone: UTC-6 (Central (CST))
  - Summer (DST): UTC-5 (CDT)
- ZIP code: 71923
- Area code: 870
- FIPS code: 05-10360
- GNIS feature ID: 2405355
- Website: www.thecityofcaddovalley.com

Caddo Valley is a town in Clark County, Arkansas, United States. The population was 595 at the 2020 census.

== Geography ==
Caddo Valley is located in northeastern Clark County on the north side of the Caddo River 2 miles (3 km) west of its mouth at the Ouachita River. The town is 4 miles (6 km) north of Arkadelphia, the county seat.

According to the United States Census Bureau, Caddo Valley has a total area of 2.9 square miles (7.6 km^{2}), of which 0.012 square miles (0.03 km^{2}), or 0.45%, is water.

== Demographics ==
Historical population
Census	Pop.	Note	%±
1980	388		—
1990	389		0.3%
2000	563		44.7%
2010	635		12.8%
2020	595		−6.3%
2025 (est.)	588	▼	−1.2%
U.S. Decennial Census

As of the census of 2000, there were 563 people, 242 households, and 150 families residing in the town. The population density was 73.7 people/km^{2} (191 people/mi^{2}). There were 274 housing units at an average density of 35.9 units/km^{2} (93 units/mi^{2}). The racial makeup of the town was 86.86% White, 9.59% Black or African American, 0.36% Native American, 1.07% from other races, and 2.13% from two or more races. 1.07% of the population were Hispanic or Latino.

There were 242 households, out of which 31.8% had children under the age of 18 living with them, 48.3% were married couples living together, 9.9% had a female householder with no husband present, and 38.0% were non-families. 30.6% of all households were made up of individuals, and 7.9% had someone living alone who was 65 years of age or older. The average household size was 2.33 and the average family size was 2.93.

In the town, the population was spread out, with 25.6% under the age of 18, 16.7% from 18 to 24, 27.9% from 25 to 44, 20.2% from 45 to 64, and 9.6% who were 65 years of age or older. The median age was 28 years. For every 100 females, there were 98.9 males. For every 100 females age 18 and over, there were 89.6 males.

The median income for a household in the town was $28,750, and the median income for a family was $35,417. Males had a median income of $25,000 compared to $18,875 for females. The per capita income for the town was $13,083. About 10.2% of families and 16.0% of the population were below the poverty line, including 20.4% of those under age 18 and 23.4% of those age 65 or over.

== Highways ==
Caddo Valley, incorporated in 1974, is a major highway intersection. The town is 4 miles (6 km) north of Arkadelphia by U.S. Route 67, which also leads northeast 21 miles (34 km) to Malvern. Caddo Valley is served by Exit 78 of Interstate 30, which leads 64 miles (103 km) northeast to Little Rock and 79 miles (127 km) southwest to Texarkana. Arkansas Highway 7 leads north from Caddo Valley 30 miles (48 km) to Hot Springs and Hot Springs National Park.

DeGray Dam is 3 miles (5 km) north, and DeGray Lake Resort State Park is 5 miles (8 km) north. The town sometimes is billed as "The Gateway to DeGray Lake".

== Education ==
It is within the Arkadelphia School District, which operates Arkadelphia High School.

== Government ==
Caddo Valley passed a 1-percent sales tax in 1981 to fund its fire and police departments. It is governed by a mayor and town council.
