= Hampton Springs Cemetery =

Historic cemetery in Arkansas, United States

- Hampton Springs Cemetery (Black Section)
- U.S. National Register of Historic Places
- Location within Arkansas Location within the United States
- Nearest city: Carthage, Arkansas
- Coordinates: 34°5′21″N 92°29′24″W
- Area: less than one acre
- Built: 1916
- MPS: Dallas County MRA
- NRHP reference No.: 83003473
- Added to NRHP: October 28, 1983

Hampton Springs Cemetery is a cemetery in rural Dallas County, Arkansas, United States, at the junction of county roads 425 and 427, near the city of Carthage. The cemetery is divided into two sections, one in which traditional European grave markers predominate, and another section in which graves are marked by a local adaptation of African burial customs.

== Historic African American Section ==
This African-American section of the cemetery is said to have been in use since the late 19th century, although its oldest identified grave is dated 1916. Most of its estimated 128 marked graves are denoted by informal means, including small bushes, ceramic objects, metal pipes, wooden stakes, offering vessels such as glass jars and bowls, and even a kerosene lamp. This section of the cemetery has been listed on the National Register of Historic Places as an important regional example of traditional African burial practices.

== See also ==
- National Register of Historic Places listings in Dallas County, Arkansas
