= Alpine, Arkansas =

- Census-designated place
- Location within Arkansas Location within the United States
- Coordinates: 34°13′37″N 93°22′42″W
- Country: United States
- State: Arkansas
- County: Clark
- Elevation: 577 ft (176 m)

Population (2020)
  - Total: 134
- Time zone: UTC-6 (Central (CST))
  - Summer (DST): UTC-5 (CDT)
- GNIS feature ID: 2805616

Alpine is an unincorporated community and census-designated place (CDP) in Clark County, Arkansas, United States, approximately eight miles east of Amity. The community center located in its heart is a popular draw for Clark County citizens during Christmas, 4th of July and Halloween celebrations annually.

It was first listed as a CDP in the 2020 census with a population of 134.

== Demographics ==
Historical population
Census	Pop.	Note	%±
2020	134		—
U.S. Decennial Census; 2020

=== 2020 census ===
Alpine CDP, Arkansas – Racial and ethnic composition Note: the US Census treats Hispanic/Latino as an ethnic category. This table excludes Latinos from the racial categories and assigns them to a separate category. Hispanics/Latinos may be of any race.
Race / Ethnicity (NH = Non-Hispanic)	Pop 2020	% 2020
White alone (NH)	131	97.76%
Black or African American alone (NH)	0	0.00%
Native American or Alaska Native alone (NH)	1	0.75%
Asian alone (NH)	0	0.00%
Pacific Islander alone (NH)	0	0.00%
Some Other Race alone (NH)	0	0.00%
Mixed Race or Multi-Racial (NH)	0	0.00%
Hispanic or Latino (any race)	2	1.49%
Total	134	100.00%

== Notable person ==
Alpine was once the childhood home of actor Billy Bob Thornton.
