= Okolona, Arkansas =

- Town
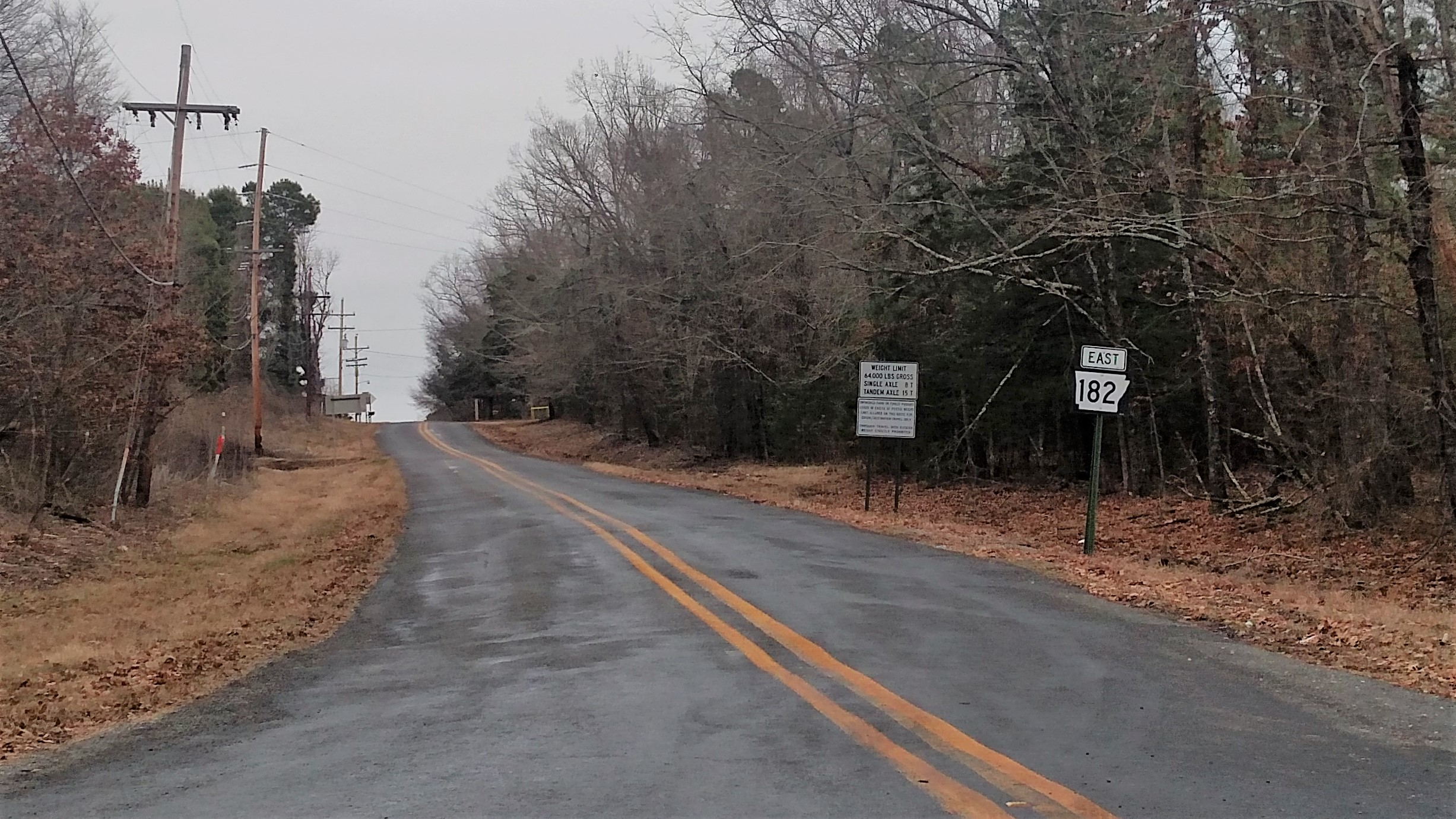
- Arkansas Highway 182 in Okolona, January 2018

- Location of Okolona in Clark County, Arkansas.
- Coordinates: 34°59′58″N 93°20′16″W
- Country: United States
- State: Arkansas
- County: Clark

Area
  - Total: 0.79 sq mi (2.05 km^{2})
  - Land: 0.79 sq mi (2.05 km^{2})
  - Water: 0 sq mi (0.00 km^{2})
- Elevation: 400 ft (120 m)

Population (2020)
  - Total: 97
  - Estimate (2025): 98 ▲
  - Density: 122.4/sq mi (47.25/km^{2})
- Time zone: UTC-6 (Central (CST))
  - Summer (DST): UTC-5 (CDT)
- ZIP code: 71962
- Area code: 870
- FIPS code: 05-51530
- GNIS feature ID: 2407041

Okolona is a town near the western edge of Clark County, Arkansas, United States. As of the 2020 census, Okolona had a population of 97.

The Battle of Elkin's Ferry of the Civil War was fought here during April 3–4, 1864, as a part of the Camden Expedition. Union forces, led by Maj. Gen. Fred Steele, sought to ford the Little Missouri River, as the local roads were impassable. The force reached Elkin's Ferry before the Confederate cavalry brigades, led by Brig. Gen. John S. Marmaduke, and the Confederates were defeated.

Okolona has several churches; the Saint Clair Baptist Church, Okolona Baptist Church, Okolona First United Methodist Church, and Center Grove United Methodist Church.

== Geography ==
Okolona is located in western Clark County. Arkansas Highway 51 passes through the community, leading northeast 21 miles (34 km) to Arkadelphia, the county seat, and south 8 miles (13 km) to Interstate 30.

According to the United States Census Bureau, the town has a total area of 0.77 square miles (2.0 km^{2}), all land.

== Demographics ==
Historical population
Census	Pop.	Note	%±
1910	399		—
1920	492		23.3%
1930	460		−6.5%
1940	525		14.1%
1950	458		−12.8%
1960	344		−24.9%
1970	233		−32.3%
1980	200		−14.2%
1990	113		−43.5%
2000	160		41.6%
2010	147		−8.1%
2020	97		−34.0%
2025 (est.)	98	▲	1.0%
U.S. Decennial Census

As of the census of 2000, there were 160 people, 70 households, and 45 families residing in the town. The population density was 79.2/km^{2} (204.8/mi^{2}). There were 86 housing units at an average density of 42.6/km^{2} (110.1/mi^{2}). The racial makeup of the town was 68.12% White and 31.88% Black or African American.

There were 70 households, out of which 22.9% had children under the age of 18 living with them, 57.1% were married couples living together, 5.7% had a female householder with no husband present, and 35.7% were non-families. 34.3% of all households were made up of individuals, and 12.9% had someone living alone who was 65 years of age or older. The average household size was 2.29 and the average family size was 2.96.

In the town, the population was spread out, with 20.0% under the age of 18, 9.4% from 18 to 24, 24.4% from 25 to 44, 24.4% from 45 to 64, and 21.9% who were 65 years of age or older. The median age was 42 years. For every 100 females, there were 100.0 males. For every 100 females age 18 and over, there were 91.0 males.

The median income for a household in the town was $30,833, and the median income for a family was $35,000. Males had a median income of $30,500 versus $17,500 for females. The per capita income for the town was $14,318. None of the families and 0.6% of the population were living below the poverty line.

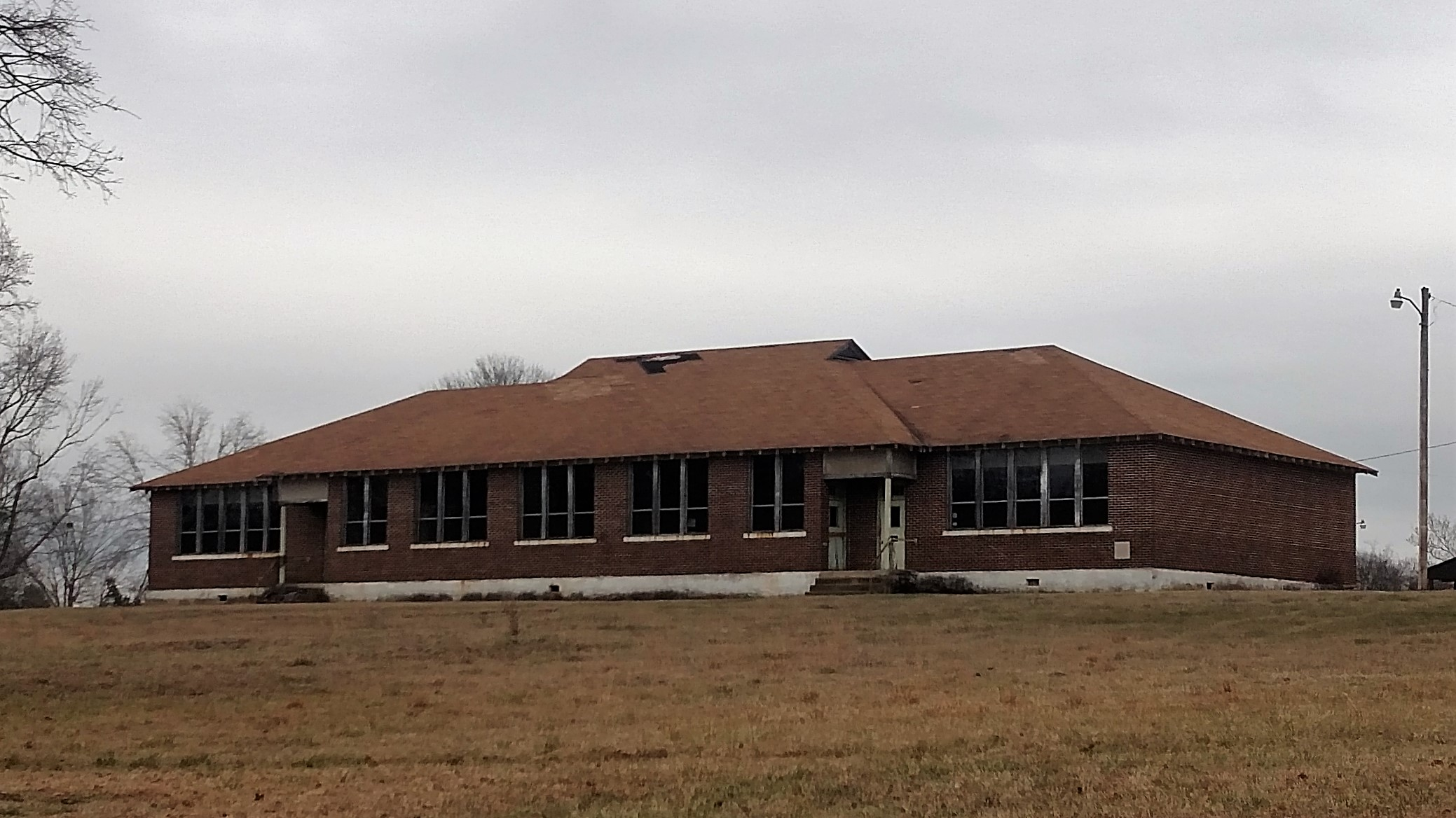
An old school building in Okolona, January 2018

== Education ==
Public education for elementary and secondary school students is provided by the Gurdon School District with area students graduating from Gurdon High School.

It was served by the Okolona School District until that district was dissolved on July 1, 1987. The Gurdon district was one of several absorbing territory from the former Okolona district.

== See also ==
- List of towns in Arkansas
