= Clark County, Arkansas =

County in Arkansas, United States

- County
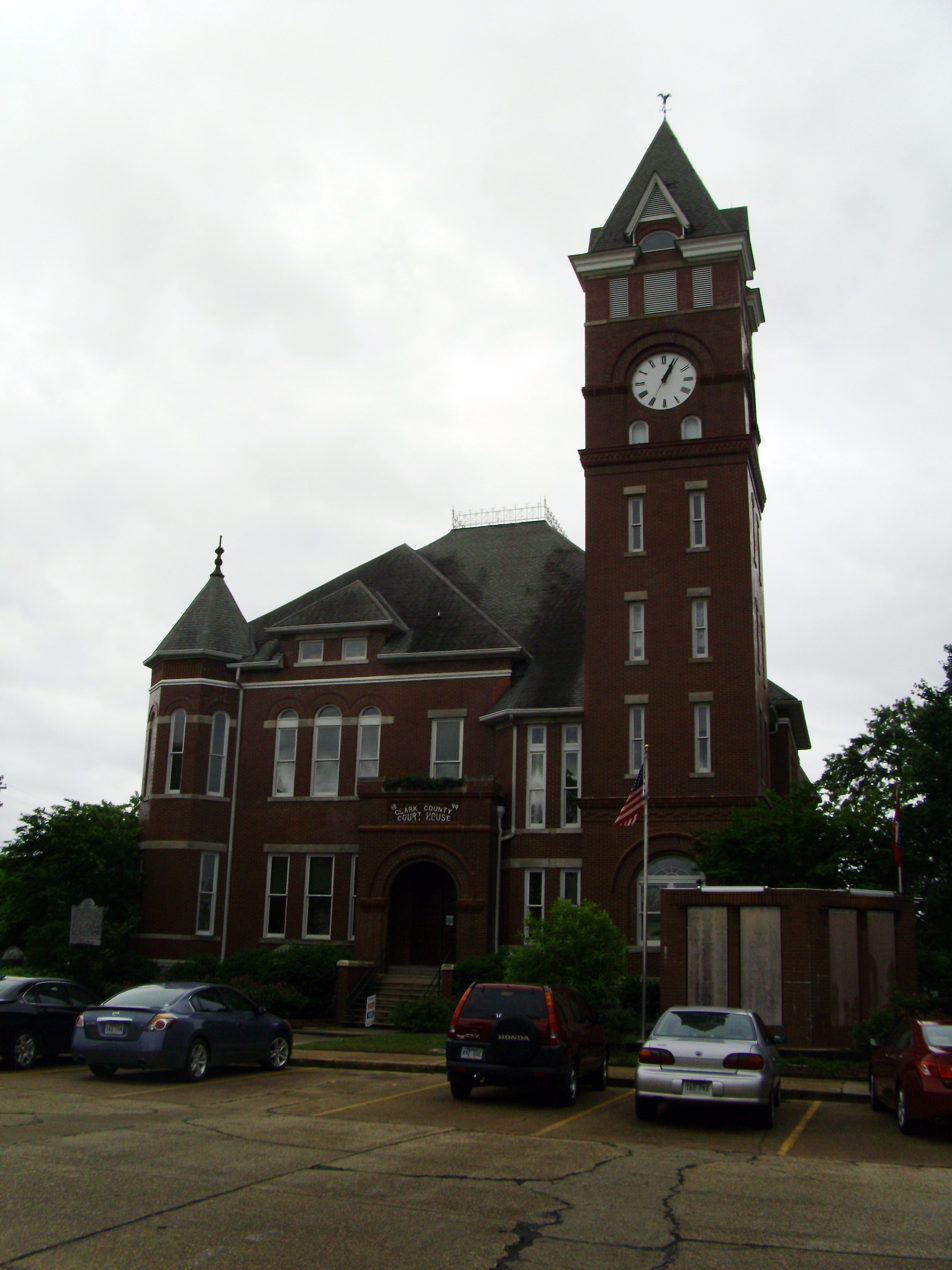
- Clark County Courthouse in Arkadelphia

- Location within the U.S. state of Arkansas
- Coordinates: 34°05′20″N 93°09′50″W
- Country: United States
- State: Arkansas
- Founded: December 15, 1818
- Named for: William Clark
- Seat: Arkadelphia
- Largest city: Arkadelphia

Area
  - Total: 883 sq mi (2,290 km^{2})
  - Land: 866 sq mi (2,240 km^{2})
  - Water: 17 sq mi (44 km^{2}) 1.9%

Population (2020)
  - Total: 21,446
  - Estimate (2025): 20,938 ▼
  - Density: 24.8/sq mi (9.56/km^{2})
- Time zone: UTC−6 (Central)
  - Summer (DST): UTC−5 (CDT)
- Congressional district: 4th
- Website: clarkcountyar.gov

Clark County is a county located in the south-central part of the U.S. state of Arkansas. As of the 2020 census, the population was 21,446. The county seat is Arkadelphia. The Arkadelphia, AR Micropolitan Statistical Area includes all of Clark County.

== History ==
Ancient Indigenous peoples occupied areas along the waterways for thousands of years prior to European exploration. Among the various cultures was the Caddoan Mississippian culture, which developed by 1000 AD and occupied certain sites in Arkansas at different times. This was the westernmost expression of the Mississippian culture, which developed a vast network and numerous centers of development throughout the Mississippi Valley and its tributaries. The Caddoans constructed substantial earthwork mounds in the areas of Arkansas and Texas; the largest in Arkansas is Battle Mound Site, built from 1200 to 1400 AD in what is present-day Lafayette County. Archeological evidence has established there was unbroken continuity from the Caddoan Mississippian people to the historic Caddo people and related Caddo-language speakers who encountered the first Europeans. Their descendants formed the modern Caddo Nation of Oklahoma.

=== 19th century ===
Settlers in the 19th century found earthwork mounds, 10 to 15 feet in height, in areas around what developed as Arkadelphia, Arkansas. Some were excavated for pottery and other grave goods.

At the time of European-American settlement after the United States acquired this territory in the Louisiana Purchase of 1803, the pioneers encountered three major Native American tribes: the Caddo, who lived along the banks of the Caddo River; the Quapaw on the Ouachita River, for several miles below what is now Arkadelphia; and the Lenape (known then as Delaware, who were driven to this area by European pressure from the mid-Atlantic East Coast) along the lower Ouachita to below present-day Camden. (This site had been named as Écore à Fabre, after a colonial French trader Fabre.)

Clark County was the third county formed by Americans in Arkansas, on December 15, 1818, together with Hempstead and Pulaski counties. The county is named after William Clark, then Governor of the Missouri Territory, which included present-day Arkansas. On November 1, 1833, the Arkansas territorial legislature created Pike County from western Clark County and part of northern Hempstead County. It was named after US explorer Zebulon Pike.

Arkadelphia was designated as the county seat in 1842. It became increasingly important as a hub after railroads were constructed to here that connected with numerous markets. Timber harvesting became important by the end of the century. By 1890, forest products were ranked next to agriculture in economic importance. In the 20th century, continued modern technological developments established the industry's continued importance in the county's economy.

Three of the six lynchings recorded in Clark County from 1877 to 1950 took place in a mass event in late January 1879. An African-American man, Ben Daniels, and three of his four sons (ranging in age from 22 to 18) were arrested as suspects in an alleged robbery and assault of a white man and held in the county jail. Daniels and two of his sons were forcibly taken out of the jail by a white mob and lynched by hanging from trees in the courthouse square, without trial. One son, believed to be Charles Daniels (22), survived for trial. He was convicted and served in prison until about 1886 or 1887.

== 20th century to present ==
From 1920 to 1960, the county population declined, as may be seen on the table below. The cotton culture had been affected by the invasion of the boll weevil, which attacked the plants; and mechanization of agriculture, reducing the need for workers. In this period, many African-American families, who still constituted most of the farm workers, also left Arkansas and other parts of the rural South to escape Jim Crow oppression and seek better employment in Northern and Midwestern cities in the Great Migration. In the latter part of this period, some migrated to the West Coast, where the defense industry developed during and after World War II offered higher paying jobs.

At the same time, the lumber industry declined, also causing a loss of jobs. Several companies had operated sawmills and related businesses in Clark County in the early part of the century. The founders of the lumber town Graysonia, Arkansas moved to Springfield, Oregon, renaming their company as Roseboro Lumber. While manufacturing industries had entered the county, several had a downturn in the 1980s.

In the 1970s, the DeGray Dam and Lake were completed along the Caddo River, providing new areas in the county for tourism and recreation, which have become major components of the economy.

== Geography ==
According to the U.S. Census Bureau, the county has a total area of 883 square miles (2,290 km^{2}), of which 866 square miles (2,240 km^{2}) is land and 17 square miles (44 km^{2}) (1.9%) is water.

=== Major highways ===
- Interstate 30
- U.S. Highway 67
- Highway 7
- Highway 8
- Highway 26
- Highway 51
- Highway 53
- Highway 84
- Highway 128
- Highway 182
- Highway 283
- Highway 346
- Highway 390

=== Adjacent counties ===
- Hot Spring County (northeast)
- Dallas County (east)
- Ouachita County (southeast)
- Nevada County (southwest)
- Pike County (west)
- Montgomery County (northwest)

== Demographics ==
Historical population
Census	Pop.	Note	%±
1830	1,369		—
1840	2,309		68.7%
1850	4,070		76.3%
1860	9,735		139.2%
1870	11,953		22.8%
1880	15,771		31.9%
1890	20,997		33.1%
1900	21,289		1.4%
1910	23,686		11.3%
1920	25,632		8.2%
1930	24,932		−2.7%
1940	24,402		−2.1%
1950	22,998		−5.8%
1960	20,950		−8.9%
1970	21,537		2.8%
1980	23,326		8.3%
1990	21,437		−8.1%
2000	23,546		9.8%
2010	22,995		−2.3%
2020	21,446		−6.7%
2025 (est.)	20,938	▼	−2.4%
U.S. Decennial Census; 1790–1960 1900–1990; 1990–2000 2010

=== 2020 census ===
As of the 2020 census, the county had a population of 21,446. The median age was 35.4 years. 18.9% of residents were under the age of 18 and 17.9% of residents were 65 years of age or older. For every 100 females there were 89.3 males, and for every 100 females age 18 and over there were 86.9 males age 18 and over.

The racial makeup of the county was 66.8% White, 23.9% Black or African American, 0.4% American Indian and Alaska Native, 0.7% Asian, 0.1% Native Hawaiian and Pacific Islander, 2.9% from some other race, and 5.2% from two or more races. Hispanic or Latino residents of any race comprised 5.1% of the population.

47.0% of residents lived in urban areas, while 53.0% lived in rural areas.

There were 8,170 households in the county, of which 27.8% had children under the age of 18 living in them. Of all households, 43.2% were married-couple households, 19.0% were households with a male householder and no spouse or partner present, and 32.6% were households with a female householder and no spouse or partner present. About 32.3% of all households were made up of individuals and 14.0% had someone living alone who was 65 years of age or older.

There were 9,977 housing units, of which 18.1% were vacant. Among occupied housing units, 63.5% were owner-occupied and 36.5% were renter-occupied. The homeowner vacancy rate was 1.8% and the rental vacancy rate was 16.5%.

=== 2000 census ===
As of the 2000 census, there were 23,546 people, 8,912 households, and 5,819 families residing in the county. The population density was 27 people per square mile (10 people/km^{2}). There were 10,166 housing units at an average density of 12 units per square mile (4.6 units/km^{2}). The racial makeup of the county was 74.28% White, 22.02% Black or African American, 0.46% Native American, 0.62% Asian, 0.04% Pacific Islander, 1.37% from other races, and 1.20% from two or more races. 2.40% of the population were Hispanic or Latino of any race.

There were 8,912 households, out of which 29.80% had children under the age of 18 living with them, 49.80% were married couples living together, 12.20% had a female householder with no husband present, and 34.70% were non-families. 27.60% of all households were made up of individuals, and 12.40% had someone living alone who was 65 years of age or older. The average household size was 2.38 and the average family size was 2.91.

In the county, the population was spread out, with 21.70% under the age of 18, 20.00% from 18 to 24, 23.80% from 25 to 44, 19.90% from 45 to 64, and 14.60% who were 65 years of age or older. The median age was 32 years. For every 100 females there were 92.70 males. For every 100 females age 18 and over, there were 88.90 males.

The median income for a household in the county was $28,845, and the median income for a family was $37,092. Males had a median income of $28,692 versus $19,886 for females. The per capita income for the county was $14,533. About 13.50% of families and 19.10% of the population were below the poverty line, including 20.90% of those under age 18 and 18.40% of those age 65 or over.

== Culture ==
An alcohol prohibition (dry) county since 1943, Clark County voted in 2011 to make the county wet, allowing countywide retail alcohol sales.

== Politics and government ==
=== Government ===
The county government is a constitutional body granted specific powers by the Constitution of Arkansas and the Arkansas Code. The quorum court is the legislative branch of the county government and controls all spending and revenue collection. Representatives are called justices of the peace and are elected from county districts every even-numbered year. The number of districts in a county vary from nine to fifteen, and district boundaries are drawn by the county election commission. The Clark County Quorum Court has eleven members. Presiding over quorum court meetings is the county judge, who serves as the chief operating officer of the county. The county judge is elected at-large and does not vote in quorum court business, although capable of vetoing quorum court decisions.

Republicans hold every county-wide office except the Sheriff and Collector, and have a seven-to-four super-majority on the Quorum Court. Most positions regularly go unopposed with only one candidate making the general election ballot. Democrats picked up one seat in 2022 by flipping District 2.

Clark County, Arkansas Elected County-Wide Officials
Office	Officeholder	Party
County Judge	Troy Tucker	Republican
County Clerk	Tracey Pruitt	Republican
Circuit Clerk	Brian Daniel	Republican
Sheriff/Collector	Jason Watson	Democratic
Treasurer	Karen Arnold	Republican
Assessor	Mona Vance	Republican
Coroner	Tim Welch	Republican
Constable (Caddo Township)	George Hawthorn	Republican

The composition of the Quorum Court following the 2024 elections is 7 Republicans and 4 Democrats. Justices of the Peace (members) of the Quorum Court following the elections are:

Quorum Court
District	Justice of the Peace	Party	District description
1	Zach Bledsoe	Democratic	North-east Arkadelphia, including Ouachita Baptist University
2	Michael L. Ankton	Democratic	Most of southern Arkadelphia
3	Vanilla Nelson Hannah	Democratic	North-central Arkadelphia, including Henderson State University
4	Llewellyn Terry Sr.	Democratic	Stretches from central Arkadelphia to south-east Arkadelphia
5	Jimmy King	Republican	North-west Arkadelphia
6	Stuart Thomas	Republican	North-central Clark County, including part of Hollywood, with an arm reaching north-west into parts of Alpine and Fendley
7	Jenna Scott	Republican	North-east Clark County, including Caddo Valley and Joan
8	Garry (B.J.) Johns	Republican	North-west Clark County, including Amity and parts of Alpine and Fendley
9	Andrea Angle	Republican	Starts just south of Okolona and stretches south-east, including Burtsell, most of Gurdon, and part of Beirne
10	Wayne Baumgardner	Republican	Stretches from central Clark County to its western border with Pike County, including Okolona, Boswell, and part of Hollywood
11	Tracy Ellis Drake	Republican	South-east Clark County, including Whelen Springs, Barringer, Kansas, Vaden, and part of Gurdon, with an arm reaching north to Curtis and Gum Springs

=== Politics ===
John Kerry was the last Democrat to win the county in a presidential election, in 2004. John McCain and Mitt Romney defeated Barack Obama by single-digit margins here, and Donald Trump beat former Arkansas First Lady Hillary Clinton by a nine-point margin. Four years later, Trump defeated Joe Biden by a margin of over 14 points, the largest margin for a Republican since Richard Nixon defeated George McGovern by over 20 points in 1972. In 2024, Trump would surpass even that, defeating Kamala Harris by 21 points. Mike Ross was the last Democrat to win the county in a gubernatorial election, in 2014. Conner Eldridge was the last Democrat to win the county in a US Senate election, in 2016.

As of 2023, Clark County is split between districts 89 and 90 in the Arkansas House of Representatives and fully contained within District 3 in the Arkansas Senate. All three seats are held by Republicans Justin Gonzales, Richard Womack, and Steve Crowell, respectively.

United States presidential election results for Clark County, Arkansas
Year	Republican		Democratic		Third party(ies)	
Year	No.	%	No.	%	No.	%
1896	833	29.49%	1,910	67.61%	82	2.90%
1900	753	35.54%	1,232	58.14%	134	6.32%
1904	732	44.74%	722	44.13%	182	11.12%
1908	1,007	43.48%	1,206	52.07%	103	4.45%
1912	376	21.78%	1,051	60.89%	299	17.32%
1916	678	25.56%	1,975	74.44%	0	0.00%
1920	1,020	40.06%	1,507	59.19%	19	0.75%
1924	483	25.29%	1,223	64.03%	204	10.68%
1928	913	33.37%	1,817	66.41%	6	0.22%
1932	183	5.66%	3,037	93.88%	15	0.46%
1936	193	8.92%	1,962	90.71%	8	0.37%
1940	311	13.36%	2,008	86.29%	8	0.34%
1944	637	24.30%	1,981	75.58%	3	0.11%
1948	383	15.27%	1,750	69.75%	376	14.99%
1952	1,679	36.13%	2,963	63.76%	5	0.11%
1956	1,973	40.76%	2,809	58.04%	58	1.20%
1960	1,357	26.70%	3,295	64.82%	431	8.48%
1964	1,884	31.21%	4,127	68.36%	26	0.43%
1968	1,642	22.96%	2,733	38.22%	2,776	38.82%
1972	4,173	59.96%	2,741	39.38%	46	0.66%
1976	1,816	21.42%	6,641	78.32%	22	0.26%
1980	2,743	29.97%	6,122	66.89%	288	3.15%
1984	4,185	47.27%	4,638	52.39%	30	0.34%
1988	3,389	41.69%	4,675	57.50%	66	0.81%
1992	2,403	26.93%	5,767	64.64%	752	8.43%
1996	2,112	26.00%	5,281	65.02%	729	8.98%
2000	3,776	43.77%	4,661	54.03%	189	2.19%
2004	4,144	44.99%	4,990	54.17%	77	0.84%
2008	4,608	50.67%	4,267	46.92%	219	2.41%
2012	4,343	51.65%	3,811	45.32%	255	3.03%
2016	4,404	51.65%	3,620	42.46%	502	5.89%
2020	4,616	54.99%	3,438	40.95%	341	4.06%
2024	4,526	59.11%	2,959	38.64%	172	2.25%

== Communities ==
=== Incorporated cities ===
- Amity
- Arkadelphia (county seat)
- Caddo Valley
- Gurdon

=== Incorporated towns ===
- Gum Springs
- Okolona
- Whelen Springs

=== Census-designated places ===
- Alpine
- Beirne

=== Other unincorporated communities ===
- Barringer
- Boswell
- Burtsell
- Curtis
- Fendley
- Hollywood
- Joan
- Kansas
- Vaden

=== Ghost towns and former communities ===
- Clear Spring
- Graysonia
- Greenville (former county seat)
- Halfway
- Lenox
- Rome

=== Townships ===
Note: Unlike most Arkansas counties, Clark County has only one township. That township encompasses the entire county.

Townships in Arkansas are the divisions of a county. Each township includes unincorporated areas; some may have incorporated cities or towns within part of their boundaries. Arkansas townships have limited purposes in modern times. However, the United States census does list Arkansas population based on townships (sometimes referred to as "county subdivisions" or "minor civil divisions"). Townships are also of value for historical purposes in terms of genealogical research. Each town or city is within one or more townships in an Arkansas county based on census maps and publications. The townships of Clark County are listed below; listed in parentheses are the cities, towns, and/or census-designated places that are fully or partially inside the township.

- Caddo

== Notable residents ==
- Daniel Davis, actor, best known for playing "Niles the butler" in the television series The Nanny, was born in Gurdon.
- Jody Evans, country music singer, started his music career in Clark County, and works for the Arkadelphia Police Department.
- Cliff Harris, football player, Dallas Cowboys NFL, played college football for the Ouachita Baptist University football team.
- Bob C. Riley, politician, was born and raised in Arkadelphia. The Democrat served as Lieutenant Governor from 1971 to 1975.
- Jerry K. Thomasson, politician and state representative, was born and raised in Arkadelphia. He switched to the Republican Party in 1966 and ran unsuccessfully for state attorney general in 1966.
- Billy Bob Thornton, film actor, grew up in Alpine.

== See also ==
- Arkansas Highway 392 (1968–1977)
- List of lakes in Clark County, Arkansas
- National Register of Historic Places listings in Clark County, Arkansas
- Quicksilver Rush
