= Gurdon, Arkansas =

- City
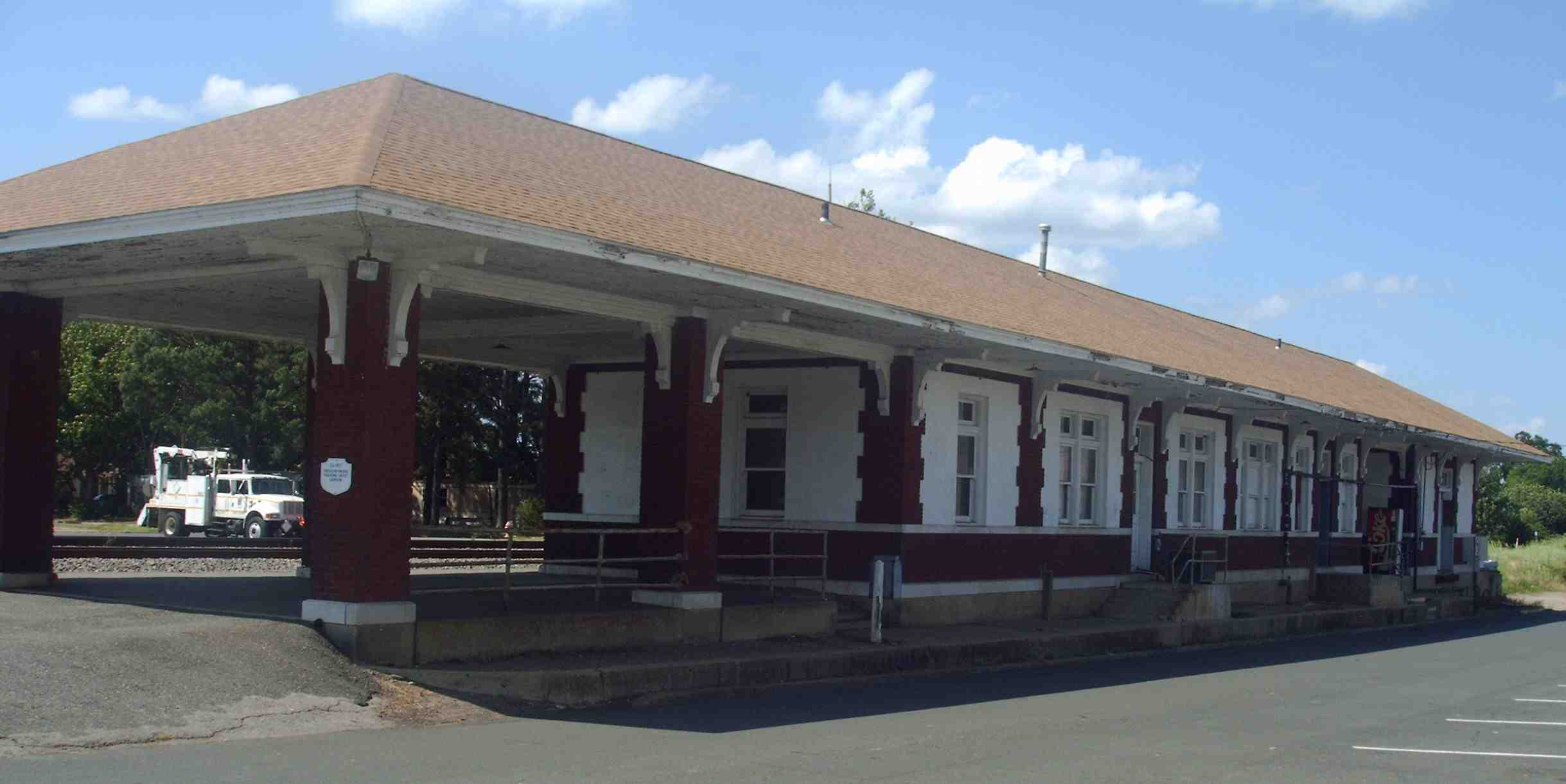
- Train depot in Gurdon, June 2008

- Location of Gurdon in Clark County, Arkansas.
- Coordinates: 33°55′0″N 93°9′2″W
- Country: United States
- State: Arkansas
- County: Clark

Area
  - Total: 2.49 sq mi (6.46 km^{2})
  - Land: 2.42 sq mi (6.28 km^{2})
  - Water: 0.069 sq mi (0.18 km^{2})
- Elevation: 203 ft (62 m)

Population (2020)
  - Total: 1,840
  - Estimate (2025): 1,817 ▼
  - Density: 758.7/sq mi (292.93/km^{2})
- Time zone: UTC-6 (Central (CST))
  - Summer (DST): UTC-5 (CDT)
- ZIP code: 71743
- Area code: 870
- FIPS code: 05-29200
- GNIS feature ID: 2403775

Gurdon is a city in Clark County, Arkansas, United States. The population was 1,840 at the 2020 census.

== History ==
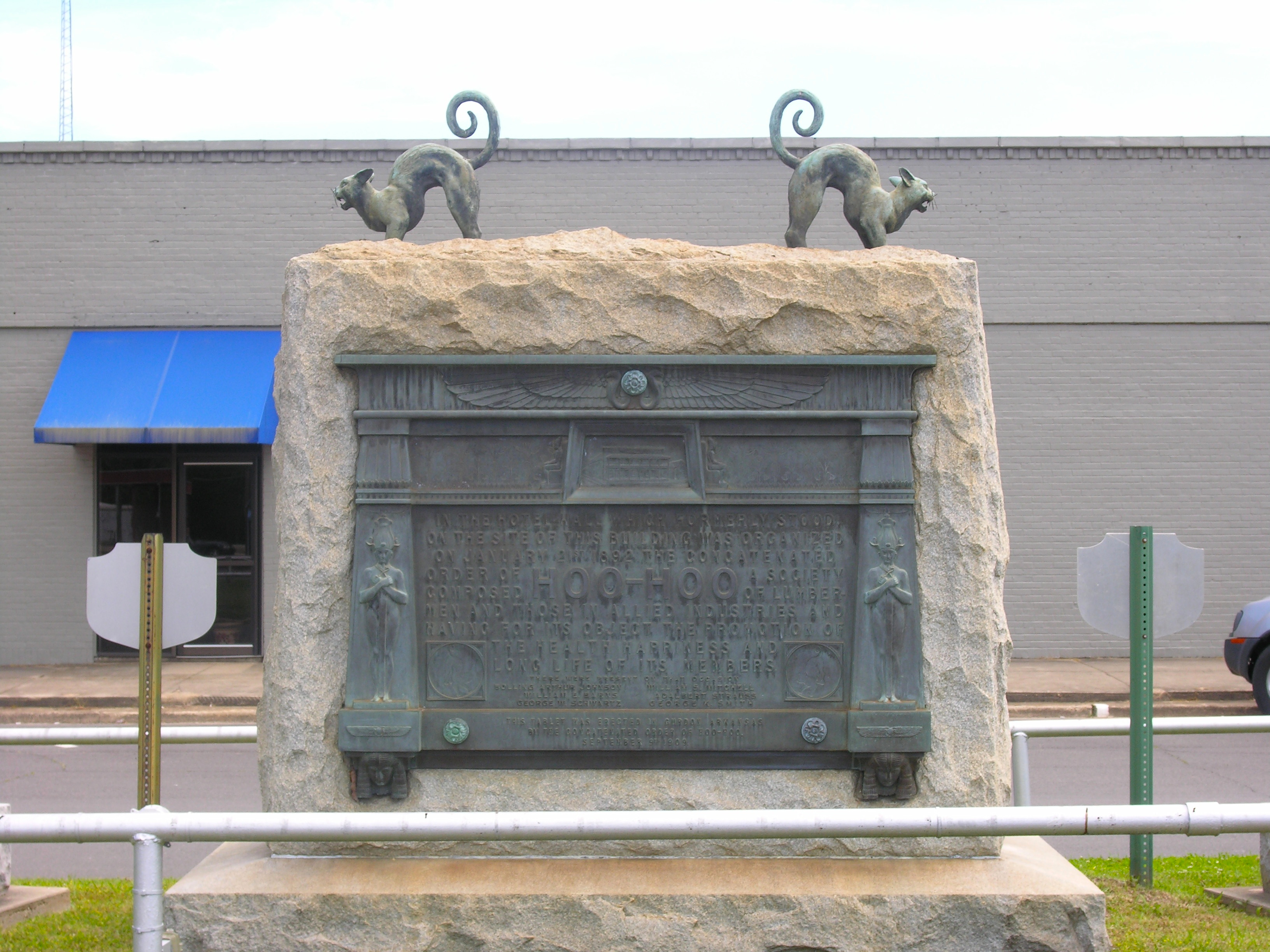
Hoo Hoo Cats on a monument dedicated to the Concatenated Order of Hoo-Hoo in Gurdon; listed on National Register of Historic Places, April 2009

The town was founded in the late 19th century as a railroad town for the timber industry on the St. Louis, Iron Mountain and Southern Railway (now the Union Pacific Railroad). Originally settled in 1873, the city was incorporated in 1880. The town's name derives from railroad executive Henry Gurdon Marquand's middle name.

Gurdon is the birthplace of the Concatenated Order of Hoo-Hoo, in 1892.

== Geography ==
Gurdon is located in southern Clark County. U.S. Route 67 passes through the city, leading northeast 15 miles (24 km) to Arkadelphia, the county seat, and southwest 16 miles (26 km) to Prescott.

According to the United States Census Bureau, the city has a total area of 2.5 square miles (6.6 km^{2}), of which 2.5 square miles (6.4 km^{2}) is land and 0.077 square miles (0.2 km^{2}), or 2.88%, is water.

== Demographics ==
Historical population
Census	Pop.	Note	%±
1890	802		—
1900	1,045		30.3%
1910	1,284		22.9%
1920	1,469		14.4%
1930	2,172		47.9%
1940	2,045		−5.8%
1950	2,390		16.9%
1960	2,166		−9.4%
1970	2,075		−4.2%
1980	2,707		30.5%
1990	2,199		−18.8%
2000	2,276		3.5%
2010	2,212		−2.8%
2020	1,840		−16.8%
2025 (est.)	1,817	▼	−1.2%
U.S. Decennial Census

=== 2020 census ===
As of the 2020 census, Gurdon had a population of 1,840. The median age was 38.7 years. 25.8% of residents were under the age of 18 and 16.6% of residents were 65 years of age or older. For every 100 females there were 86.4 males, and for every 100 females age 18 and over there were 85.1 males age 18 and over.

0.0% of residents lived in urban areas, while 100.0% lived in rural areas.

There were 746 households in Gurdon, of which 33.4% had children under the age of 18 living in them. Of all households, 39.3% were married-couple households, 18.5% were households with a male householder and no spouse or partner present, and 35.5% were households with a female householder and no spouse or partner present. About 29.2% of all households were made up of individuals and 13.3% had someone living alone who was 65 years of age or older.

There were 949 housing units, of which 21.4% were vacant. The homeowner vacancy rate was 2.1% and the rental vacancy rate was 14.6%.

Gurdon racial composition
Race	Num.	Perc.
White (non-Hispanic)	763	41.47%
Black or African American (non-Hispanic)	711	38.64%
Native American	8	0.43%
Asian	1	0.05%
Other/Mixed	77	4.18%
Hispanic or Latino	280	15.22%

=== 2010 census ===
As of the 2010 United States census, there were 2,212 people living in the city. The racial makeup of the city was 50.1% White, 37.9% Black, 0.1% Native American, 0.1% Asian, <0.1% Pacific Islander, 10.4% from some other race and 1.4% from two or more races. 14.3% were Hispanic or Latino of any race.

=== 2000 census ===
At the 2000 census, there were 2,276 people, 934 households and 625 families living in the city. The population density was 908.0 inhabitants per square mile (350.6/km^{2}). There were 1,077 housing units at an average density of 429.7 per square mile (165.9/km^{2}). The racial makeup of the city was 60.24% White, 35.76% Black or African American, 0.13% Native American, 0.04% Asian, 0.04% Pacific Islander, 3.12% from other races, and 0.66% from two or more races. 4.35% of the population were Hispanic or Latino of any race.

There were 934 households, of which 32.8% had children under the age of 18 living with them, 44.9% were married couples living together, 18.7% had a female householder with no husband present, and 33.0% were non-families. 30.2% of all households were made up of individuals, and 13.9% had someone living alone who was 65 years of age or older. The average household size was 2.44 and the average family size was 3.01.

27.9% of the population were under the age of 18, 9.7% from 18 to 24, 26.6% from 25 to 44, 20.2% from 45 to 64, and 15.6% who were 65 years of age or older. The median age was 35 years. For every 100 females, there were 85.9 males. For every 100 females age 18 and over, there were 82.0 males.

The median household income was $26,446, and the median family income was $33,564. Males had a median income of $25,479 versus $18,158 for females. The per capita income for the city was $15,043 About 14.1% of families and 19.0% of the population were below the poverty line, including 27.1% of those under age 18 and 16.8% of those age 65 or over.

== Education ==
=== Public education ===
Elementary and secondary education is provided by the Gurdon School District, which leads students to graduate from Gurdon High School. The school's mascot is the Go-Devil with purple and gold as the school colors.

=== Public libraries ===
Gurdon is supported by the Cabe Public Library, which is a branch library of the Clark County Library System.

== Gurdon Light ==
The town is especially known for the "Gurdon Light", a series of unexplained phenomena which occur in a wooded area by railroad tracks. Viewers have reported a light or lights hovering in mid-air. Local folk legend explains the light appearances as a deceased railwayman's lantern. Scientific work on the origin of the lights has proven inconclusive. The light has been featured on local media and on the TV show Unsolved Mysteries.

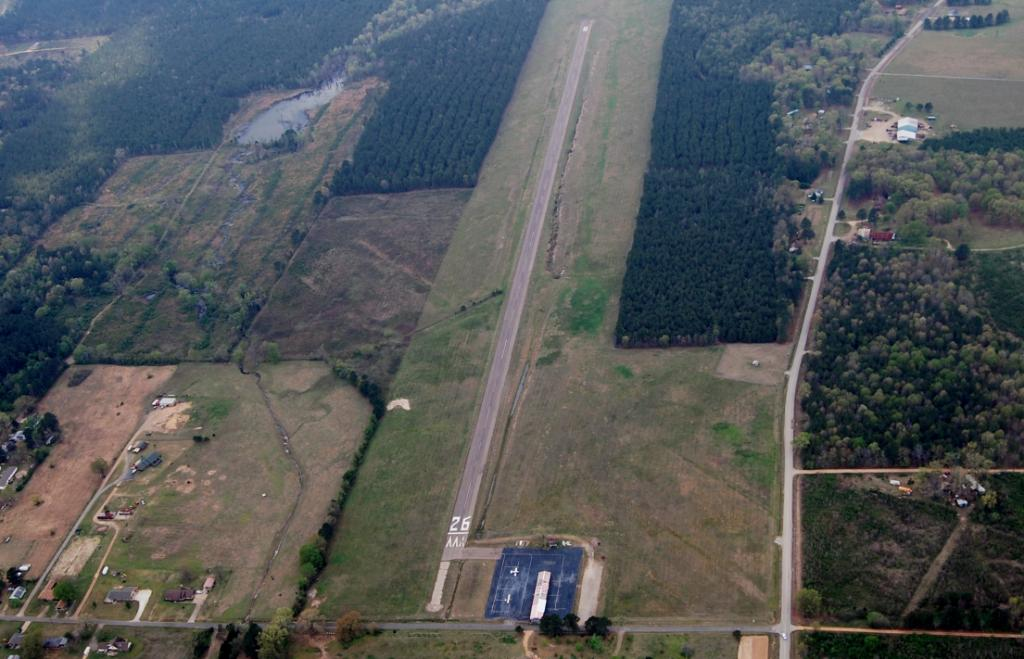
Lowe Field, April 2011

== Notable people ==
- Daniel Davis, actor, grew up in Gurdon.
- Tav Falco, a musical performer and actor was raised in Gurdon.
- Adrienne Nelson, jurist, grew up in Gurdon.
- Sailor Art Thomas, professional wrestler
- Jimmy Witherspoon, a blues artist, was born in 1923 in Gurdon
- Harold L. Walters, composer
- Russell Butler, artist best known as buZ blurr, lived in Gurdon.

== See also ==
- List of cities in Arkansas
