= List of Hydrellia species =

This is a list of 240 species in Hydrellia, a genus of shore flies in the family Ephydridae.

== Hydrellia species ==
- H. acutipennis Harrison, 1959^{c g}
- H. administrata Bock, 1990^{c g}
- H. advenae Cresson, 1934
- H. affinis Meigen, 1838
- H. agitator Deonier, 1971
- H. ainsworthi Deonier, 1971
- H. alabamae Deonier, 1993
- H. albiceps (Meigen, 1824)
- H. albifacies (Adams, 1905)
- H. albifrons (Fallén, 1813)
- H. albilabris (Meigen, 1830)
- H. alboguttata Loew, 1845
- H. americana Cresson, 1931
- H. amnicola Deonier, 1971
- H. amplecta Deonier, 1995
- H. anguliterga Deeming, 2002
- H. annulata Loew, 1845
- H. apalachee Deonier, 1993
- H. approximata Becker, 1903
- H. argyrogenia Becker, 1896
- H. argyrostoma (Stenhammar, 1844)
- H. armata Canzoneri & Meneghini, 1976^{c g}
- H. ascita Cresson, 1942
- H. asymmetrica Papp, 1983^{c g}
- H. atlas Vitte, 1989^{c g}
- H. atroglauca Coquillett, 1910
- H. aurifer Cresson, 1932
- H. balciunasi Bock, 1990^{c g}
- H. bergi Cresson, 1941
- H. bezzii Cogan, 1980^{c g}
- H. bicarina Deonier, 1995
- H. bicolor Meigen, 1838
- H. bicolorithorax Giordani Soika, 1956^{c g}
- H. bilobifera Cresson, 1936^{i c g}
- H. biloxiae Deonier, 1971
- H. bionotata Canzoneri & Meneghini, 1969^{c g}
- H. bocaiuvensis Rodrigues, Mathi & Couri, 2014^{g}
- H. bogorae Deonier, 1993
- H. borealis Cresson, 1944^{i c g}
- H. brunifacies Robineau-Desvoidy, 1830
- H. brunnipleura Giordani Soika, 1956^{c g}
- H. bryani Deonier, 1995
- H. bumbunae Canzoneri, 1982^{c g}
- H. caesia (Stenhammar, 1844)
- H. caledonica Collin, 1966^{c g}
- H. caliginosa Cresson, 1936^{i c g}
- H. calverti Cresson, 1918^{c g}
- H. canzonerii Zatwarnicki, 1988^{c g}
- H. cardamines Haliday, 1839^{c g}
- H. careelensis Bock, 1990^{c g}
- H. cavator Deonier, 1971
- H. cephalotes Canzoneri & Meneghini, 1969^{c g}
- H. ceramensis Meijere, 1913^{c g}
- H. cessator Deonier, 1971
- H. chinensis Qi & Li, 1983^{c g}
- H. chrisina Robineau-Desvoidy, 1830
- H. chrysella Robineau-Desvoidy, 1830
- H. cinerascens Macquart, 1835^{c g}
- H. cochleariae Haliday, 1839^{c g}
- H. columbata Deonier, 1971
- H. concii Canzoneri & Meneghini, 1975^{c g}
- H. concolor (Stenhammar, 1844)
- H. conformis Loew, 1869^{i c g}
- H. congensis Giordani Soika, 1956^{c g}
- H. crassipes Cresson, 1931
- H. cruralis Coquillett, 1910
- H. decens Cresson, 1931
- H. deceptor Deonier, 1971
- H. definita Cresson, 1944^{i c g}
- H. discursa Deonier, 1971
- H. dubia Dahl, 1968^{c g}
- H. egeriae Rodrigues, Mathis & Hauser, 2015^{g}
- H. elegans Dahl, 1973^{c g}
- H. enderbii (Hutton, 1901)^{c g}
- H. fascitibia (Roser, 1840)^{c g}
- H. feijeni Deeming, 2002
- H. flaviceps (Meigen, 1830)
- H. flavicornis (Fallén, 1823)^{c g}
- H. flavicoxalis Cresson, 1944^{i c g}
- H. flavipes Macquart, 1835^{c g}
- H. floridana Deonier, 1971
- H. formosa Loew, 1861^{i c g}
- H. frontalis Loew, 1860^{c g}
- H. frontosa Becker, 1926^{c g}
- H. fuliginosa Robineau-Desvoidy, 1830
- H. fulviceps (Stenhammar, 1844)
- H. fulvipes Macquart, 1835^{c g}
- H. fusca (Stenhammar, 1844)
- H. geniculata (Stenhammar, 1844)
- H. genitalis Bock, 1990^{c g}
- H. gentilis Dahl, 1968^{c g}
- H. ghanii Deonier, 1978^{c g}
- H. gladiator Deonier, 1971
- H. griseola (Fallén, 1813)
- H. harti Cresson, 1936^{i c g}
- H. hawaiiensis Cresson, 1936^{i c g}
- H. huttoni Cresson, 1948^{c g}
- H. idolator Deonier, 1971
- H. indicae Deonier, 1978^{c g}
- H. insulata Deonier, 1971
- H. inusitata Canzoneri & Rampini, 1998^{c g}
- H. ipsata Zatwarnicki, 1988^{c g}
- H. ischiaca Loew, 1862^{i c g}
- H. italica Canzoneri & Meneghini, 1974^{c g}
- H. itascae Deonier, 1971
- H. johnsoni Cresson, 1941
- H. karenae Canzoneri, 1996^{c g}
- H. lappoinca (Stenhammar, 1844)
- H. lata Cresson, 1944^{i c g}
- H. laticapsula Deonier, 1993
- H. laticeps (Stenhammar, 1844)
- H. latipalpis Cresson, 1943^{c g}
- H. leannae Bock, 1990^{c g}
- H. limnobii Deonier, 1993
- H. limosina Becker, 1903
- H. lineata Macquart, 1835^{c g}
- H. litoralis Miyagi, 1977^{c g}
- H. longiseta Rodrigues, Mathi & Couri, 2014^{g}
- H. lucida Macquart, 1835^{c g}
- H. luctuosa Cresson, 1942
- H. lunata Cresson, 1932
- H. luteipes Cresson, 1932
- H. maculiventris Becker, 1896
- H. magna Miyagi, 1977^{c g}
- H. manitobae Deonier, 1971
- H. mareeba Bock, 1990^{c g}
- H. maura Meigen, 1838
- H. mayoli Canzoneri & Rallo, 1996^{c g}
- H. meigeni Zatwarnicki, 1988^{c g}
- H. melanderi Deonier, 1971
- H. meneghinii Canzoneri, 1996^{c g}
- H. michelae Bock, 1990^{c g}
- H. minutissima Papp, 1983^{c g}
- H. morrisoni Cresson, 1924^{i c g}
- H. mutata (Zetterstedt, 1846)^{c g}
- H. naivashae Canzoneri & Raffone, 1987^{c g}
- H. najadis Deonier, 1993
- H. nemoralis Dahl, 1968^{c g}
- H. nigra Canzoneri, 1982^{c g}
- H. nigricans (Stenhammar, 1844)
- H. nigriceps (Meigen, 1830)
- H. nigripes Robineau-Desvoidy, 1830
- H. nigroquadrimaculata Giordani Soika, 1956^{c g}
- H. nitida Robineau-Desvoidy, 1830
- H. nobilis (Loew, 1862)^{i c g}
- H. nostimoides Frey, 1958^{c g}
- H. notata Deonier, 1971
- H. notiphiloides Cresson, 1924^{i c g}
- H. novaezealandiae Harrison, 1959^{c g}
- H. nympheae (Stenhammar, 1844)
- H. obscura (Meigen, 1830)
- H. ocalae Deonier, 1995
- H. ochtheroides Canzoneri & Rampini, 1998^{c g}
- H. opaca Meigen, 1838
- H. orientalis Miyagi, 1977^{c g}
- H. osorno Cresson, 1931
- H. otteliae Séguy, 1951^{c g}
- H. padi Canzoneri & Meneghini, 1985^{c g}
- H. pakistanae Deonier, 1978^{c g}
- H. pallipes (Meigen, 1830)
- H. parafrontosa Papp, 1983^{c g}
- H. penicili Cresson, 1944^{c g}
- H. penicilli Cresson, 1944^{i c}
- H. perfida Canzoneri & Rampini, 1994^{c g}
- H. perplexa Bock, 1990^{c g}
- H. personata Deonier, 1971
- H. philippina Ferino, 1968^{c g}
- H. pilitarsis (Stenhammar, 1844)
- H. platygastra Cresson, 1931
- H. poecilogastra Becker, 1903
- H. pontederiae Deonier, 1993
- H. porphyrops Haliday, 1839^{c g}
- H. portis Cresson, 1932
- H. proclinata Cresson, 1915^{i c g}
- H. procteri Cresson, 1934
- H. propinqua Wahlgren, 1947^{c g}
- H. prosternalis Deeming, 1977^{c g}
- H. prudens Curran, 1930^{i c g}
- H. pseudopulchella Canzoneri & Rampini, 1998^{c g}
- H. pubescens Becker, 1926^{c g}
- H. pulchella Canzoneri & Meneghini, 1969^{c g}
- H. pulla Cresson, 1931
- H. punctum Becker, 1909^{c g}
- H. raffonei Canzoneri & Rampini, 1989^{c g}
- H. ranunculi Haliday, 1839^{c g}
- H. rharbia Vitte, 1989^{c g}
- H. rixator Deonier, 1971
- H. sagittata Canzoneri & Rampini, 1998^{c g}
- H. saharae Giordani Soika, 1956^{c g}
- H. saltator Deonier, 1971
- H. sarahae Deonier, 1993
- H. sasakii Yuasa & Isitani, 1939^{c g}
- H. scarpai Canzoneri & Vienna, 1987^{c g}
- H. schneiderae Rodrigues, Mathi & Couri, 2014^{g}
- H. serena Cresson, 1931
- H. serica Bock, 1990^{c g}
- H. similis Rodrigues, Mathi & Couri, 2014^{g}
- H. simplex Rodrigues, Mathi & Couri, 2014^{g}
- H. soikai Cogan, 1980^{c g}
- H. spicornis Cresson, 1918^{i c g}
- H. spinicornis Cresson, 1918^{c g}
- H. stratiotae Hering, 1925^{c g}
- H. stratiotella Wahlgren, 1947^{c g}
- H. subalbiceps Collin, 1966^{c g}
- H. subnitens Cresson, 1931
- H. surata Deonier, 1971
- H. suspecta Cresson, 1936^{i c g}
- H. svecica Zatwarnicki, 1988^{c g}
- H. tarsata Haliday, 1839^{c g}
- H. tenebricosa Collin, 1939^{c g}
- H. thoracica Haliday, 1839^{c g}
- H. tibialis Cresson, 1917^{i c g}
- H. tibiospica Deonier, 1995
- H. toma Mathis & Zatwarnicki, 2010^{c g}
- H. tozzii Canzoneri & Raffone, 1987^{c g}
- H. trichaeta Cresson, 1944^{i c g}
- H. trifasciata Bock, 1990^{c g}
- H. tritici Coquillett, 1903^{c g}
- H. unigena Cresson, 1944^{c g}
- H. valerosiae Canzoneri & Rampini, 1990^{c g}
- H. valida Loew, 1862^{i c g b}
- H. varipes Lamb, 1912^{c g}
- H. velutinifrons Tonnoir & Malloch, 1926^{c g}
- H. victoria Cresson, 1932
- H. vidua Cresson, 1932
- H. vilelai Rodrigues, Mathi & Couri, 2014^{g}
- H. viridescens Robineau-Desvoidy, 1830
- H. viridula Robineau-Desvoidy, 1830
- H. vulgaris Cresson, 1931
- H. warsakensis Deonier, 1978^{c g}
- H. wilburi Cresson, 1944^{i c g}
- H. williamsi Cresson, 1936^{i c g}
- H. wirthi Korytkowski, 1982^{c g}
- H. wirthiana Deonier, 1997^{c g}
- H. xanthocera Cresson, 1938^{c g}

Data sources: i = ITIS, c = Catalogue of Life, g = GBIF, b = Bugguide.net
