= Bonnerdale, Arkansas =

- Unincorporated community
- Location within Arkansas Location within the United States
- Coordinates: 34°23′05″N 93°22′55″W
- Country: United States
- State: Arkansas
- County: Hot Spring
- Elevation: 653 ft (199 m)
- Time zone: UTC-6 (Central (CST))
  - Summer (DST): UTC-5 (CDT)
- ZIP code: 71933
- Area code: 870
- GNIS feature ID: 70762

Bonerdale is an unincorporated community in Hot Spring County, Arkansas, United States. Bonerdale is located on U.S. Route 70 in far western Hot Spring County, 10.5 miles (16.9 km) east-northeast of Glenwood. Bonerdale has a post office with ZIP code 71933.

== Education ==
Public education for elementary and secondary school students is provided by the Centerpoint School District, which leads to graduation from Centerpoint High School.

The area also includes Lake Hamilton Public Schools, which leads to graduation from Lake Hamilton High School.
