= List of Pi Kappa Delta chapters =

Pi Kappa Delta is an American honor society and organization for intercollegiate debaters, public speakers, and instructors teaching speech, debate, and oral communication. Established in 1913 at Ottawa University, the organization is the oldest debating society in the country. In the following list of Pi Kappa Delta chapters, active chapters are indicated in bold and inactive chapters and institutions are in italics.

Chapter	Charter date and range	Instituiton	Location	Status	Ref.
Kansas Alpha	1913	Ottawa University	Ottawa, Kansas		
Iowa Alpha	1913–before 1963	Iowa Wesleyan University	Mount Pleasant, Iowa	Inactive	
Kansas Beta	1913	Washburn University	Topeka, Kansas		
Nebraska Alpha	1913–19xx ?, 1922	Nebraska Wesleyan University	Lincoln, Nebraska		
Wisconsin Alpha	1913	Ripon College	Ripon, Wisconsin		
Illinois Alpha	1914	Illinois Wesleyan University	Bloomington, Illinois		
Kansas Gamma	1914–before 1963	Kansas State University	Manhattan, Kansas	Inactive	
Iowa Beta	1914–19xx ?, 1922	Central College	Pella, Iowa		
California Alpha	1914	University of Redlands	Redlands, California		
California Beta	1914–19xx ?, 1922–1929	Occidental College	Los Angeles, California	Inactive	
Colorado Alpha	1915	Colorado State University	Fort Collins, Colorado		(Note: Chapter formed at Colorado Agricultural College, now Colorado State University.)
Kansas Delta	1915	Southwestern College	Winfield, Kansas		
Illinois Beta	1915	Eureka College	Eureka, Illinois		
South Dakota Alpha	1915	Dakota Wesleyan University	Mitchell, South Dakota		
Iowa Gamma	1915–1929	Des Moines University	Des Moines, Iowa	Inactive	(Note: The chapter went inactive when the university closed in 1929.)
Alabama Alpha	1916–1918	Alabama Polytechnic Institute	Auburn, Alabama	Inactive	
Kansas Epsilon	1916–1936	University of Wichita	Wichita, Kansas	Inactive	
Oklahoma Alpha	1916	Oklahoma State University	Stillwater, Oklahoma		
Kansas Zeta	1917	Emporia State University Teachers College	Emporia, Kansas		
Iowa Delta	1917	Morningside University	Morningside University		
South Dakota Beta	1918	Huron University	Huron, South Dakota	Inactive	(Note: The university closed in 2005.)
Colorado Beta	1918	University of Northern Colorado	Greeley, Colorado		(Note: Chapter formed at the State Normal School of Colorado, now the University of Northern Colorado.)
Michigan Alpha	1918	Kalamazoo College	Kalamazoo, Michigan		
**Iowa Epsilon**	1918	Simpson College	Indianola, Iowa	Active	
South Dakota Gamma	1919	Yankton College	Yankton, South Dakota		
Missouri Alpha	1919	Westminster College	Fulton, Missouri		
Iowa Zeta	1920–before 1963	Parsons College	Fairfield, Iowa	Inactive	
South Dakota Delta	1920	South Dakota State University	Brookings, South Dakota		
South Dakota Epsilon	1920	University of Sioux Falls	Sioux Falls, South Dakota		
Oklahoma Beta	1920–1958	University of Tulsa	Tulsa, Oklahoma	Inactive	
Nebraska Beta	1920–1932	Cotner College	Lincoln, Nebraska	Inactive	(Note: The college closed in 1933.)
Nebraska Gamma	1920	Doane College	Crete, Nebraska		
Missouri Beta	1920–before 1963	Park College	Parkville, Missouri	Inactive	
Nebraska Delta	1920	Hastings College	Hastings, Nebraska		
Maine Alpha	1920–before 1963	Colby College	Waterville, Maine	Inactive	
Illinois Gamma	1920	Carthage College	Kenosha, Wisconsin		
Kansas Eta	1920–1958	Kansas Wesleyan University	Salina, Kansas	Inactive	
Montana Alpha	1921–1951	Rocky Mountain College	Billings, Montana	Inactive	(Note: Chapter formed at Intermountain Union College, which is now the Rocky Mountain College.)
Missouri Gamma	1921	University of Central Missouri	Warrensburg, Missouri		(Note: Chapter formed at Central Missouri State Teachers College, now the University of Central Missouri.)
Ohio Alpha	1921	Baldwin Wallace University	Berea, Ohio		
Montana Beta	1921	Montana State University	Bozeman, Montana		
Kentucky Alpha	1921	Georgetown College	Georgetown, Kentucky		
**Ohio Beta**	1921	Heidelberg University	Tiffin, Ohio	Active	
Kansas Theta	1921	Pittsburg State University	Pittsburg, Kansas		(Note: Chapter formed at the Kansas State Teachers College of Pittsburg, now Pittsburg State University.)
South Carolina Alpha	1921–1934	Wofford College	Spartanburg, South Carolina	Inactive	
Minnesota Alpha	1921	Macalester College	Saint Paul, Minnesota		
Michigan Beta	1921–1938	Olivet College	Olivet, Michigan	Inactive	
Illinois Delta	1921	Bradley University	Peoria, Illinois		(Note: The chapter formed at the Bradley Polytechnic Institute, now Bradley University.)
Indiana Alpha	1921	Franklin College	Franklin, Indiana		
Michigan Gamma	1921–1958	Michigan State University	East Lansing, Michigan	Inactive	
Michigan Delta	1921	Hope College	Holland, Michigan		
Michigan Epsilon	1921	Eastern Michigan University	Ypsilanti, Michigan		(Note: Chapter formed at the Michigan State Normal College, now Eastern Michigan University.)
Texas Alpha	1921–1950	Southwestern University	Georgetown, Texas	Inactive	
Illinois Epsilon	1921–1924	Hedding College	Abingdon, Illinois	Inactive	
California Gamma	1921	California Institute of Technology	Pasadena, California		
Nebraska Epsilon	1921–1931	Grand Island College	Grand Island, Nebraska	Inactive	(Note: The college closed in 1931.)
South Dakota Zeta	1921	Northern State University	Aberdeen, South Dakota		(Note: Chapter formed at Northern State Teachers College, now Northern State University.)
Tennessee Alpha	1922	Maryville College	Maryville, Tennessee		
Missouri Delta	1922	William Jewell College	Liberty, Missouri		
Washington Alpha	1922	University of Puget Sound	Tacoma, Washington		
Ohio Gamma	1922–before 1963	Hiram College	Hiram, Ohio	Inactive	
Pennsylvania Alpha	1922	Grove City College	Grove City, Pennsylvania		
Kansas Iota	1922–before 1963	College of Emporia	Emporia, Kansas	Inactive	
Iowa Epsilon	1922	Upper Iowa University	Fayette, Iowa		
Kansas Kappa	1922	Baker University	Baldwin City, Kansas		
Illinois Zeta	1922	Monmouth College	Monmouth, Illinois		
Oklahoma Gamma	1922	Oklahoma Baptist University	Shawnee, Oklahoma		
South Carolina Beta	1922	Presbyterian College	Clinton, South Carolina		
Missouri Epsilon	1922–1928	Missouri Wesleyan College	Cameron, Missouri	Consolidated	(Note: Chapter consolidated with Kansas Kappa.)
Minnesota Beta	1922	St. Olaf College	Northfield, Minnesota		
California Delta	1922	University of the Pacific	Stockton, California		
Tennessee Beta	1922–before 1963	Tusculum University	Tusculum, Tennessee	Inactive	
Ohio Delta	1922	University of Akron	Akron, Ohio		
Missouri Zeta	1922	Culver–Stockton College	Canton, Missouri		
Oklahoma Delta	1922–before 1963	Northwestern Oklahoma State University	Alva, Oklahoma	Inactive	(Note: Chapter formed at the Northwestern Oklahoma Teachers College, now Northwestern Oklahoma State University.)
Kentucky Beta	1922	Centre College	Danville, Kentucky		
Kansas Lambda	1923	Sterling College	Sterling, Kansas		
Minnesota Gamma	1923	Gustavus Adolphus College	St. Peter, Minnesota		
Iowa Theta	1923	Coe College	Cedar Rapids, Iowa		
South Carolina Gamma	1923–1934	Newberry College	Newberry, South Carolina	Inactive	
Minnesota Delta	1923	Hamline University	Saint Paul, Minnesota		
Oklahoma Epsilon	1923	Oklahoma City University	Oklahoma City, Oklahoma		
Illinois Eta	1923	Illinois State University	Normal, Illinois		
Arkansas Alpha	1923–1952, 1962	Henderson State University	Arkadelphia, Arkansas		(Note: Chapter formed at Henderson-Brown College, now Henderson State University.)
Connecticut Alpha	1923–before 1963	University of Connecticut	Storrs, Connecticut	Inactive	(Note: Chapter formed at the Connecticut Agricultural College, now University of Connecticut.)
North Dakota Alpha	1923	University of Jamestown	Jamestown, North Dakota		
California Epsilon	1923	University of California, Los Angeles	Los Angeles, California		
Ohio Epsilon	1923	Otterbein University	Westerville, Ohio		
Kansas Mu	1923	Bethany College	Lindsborg, Kansas		
Nebraska Zeta	1923	University of Nebraska at Kearney	Kearney, Nebraska		(Note: Chapter formed at Kearney State Teachers College, now University of Nebraska at Kearney.)
Michigan Zeta	1923–1933	College of the City of Detroit	Detroit, Michigan	Inative	
**Oregon Alpha**	1924	Linfield University	McMinnville, Oregon	Active	
Arkansas Beta	1924	Ouachita Hills College	Amity, Arkansas		
Kentucky Gamma	1924–before 1963	Kentucky Wesleyan College	Owensboro, Kentucky	Inactive	
Illinois Theta	1924–before 1963	McKendree University	Lebanon, Illinois	Inactive	
Wisconsin Beta	1924	Carroll College	Helena, Montana		
Iowa Iota	1924	Westmar University	Le Mars, Iowa	Inactive	(Note: Chapter formed at Western Union College, later known as Westmar University. The university closed in 1997.)
Kansas Nu	1924	Fort Hays State University	Hays, Kansas		(Note: Chapter formed at theKansas State Teachers College of Hays Fort, now Hays State University.)
Illinois Iota	1924	North Central College	Naperville, Illinois		
South Dakota Eta	1924	Augustana University	Sioux Falls, South Dakota		
Iowa Kappa	1924–1934, 1954	Buena Vista College	Storm Lake, Iowa		
Illinois Kappa	1924–1930	Lombard College	Galesburg, Illinois	Inactive	(Note: The chapter went inactive when the college closed in 1930.)
Texas Beta	1924	Trinity University	San Antonio, Texas		
Texas Gamma	1924–1963, 1966	East Texas A&M University	Commerce, Texas		(Note: Chapter formed at East Texas State Teachers College, now East Texas A&M University.)
Kentucky Delta	1924–before 1963	Transylvania University	Lexington, Kentucky	Inactive	
Texas Delta	1924	Howard Payne University	Brownwood, Texas		
Missouri Eta	1924	University of Central Missouri	Warrensburg, Missouri		(Note: Chapter formed at Central Missouri State Teachers College, now University of Central Missouri.)
North Carolina Alpha	1925–before 1963	North Carolina State University	Raleigh, North Carolina	Inactive	(Note: Chapter formed at the North Carolina State College of Agriculture and Engineering, now North Carolina State University.)
Iowa Lambda	1925	University of Dubuque	Dubuque, Iowa		
Colorado Gamma	1925	Western Colorado University	Gunnison, Colorado		
Louisiana Alpha	1925	Louisiana Christian University	Pineville, Louisiana		(Note: Chapter formed at Louisiana College, now Louisiana Christian University.)
Texas Epsilon	1925	Baylor University	Waco, Texas		
Louisiana Beta	1926	**Centenary College of Louisiana**	Shreveport, Louisiana		
Ohio Zeta	1926	Marietta College	Marietta, Ohio		
Oklahoma Zeta	1926–before 1963	Oklahoma College for Women	Chickasha, Oklahoma	Inactive	
Minnesota Epsilon	1926	University of St. Thomas	Minneapolis and Saint Paul, Minnesota		
Iowa Mu	1926	Drake University	Des Moines, Iowa		
Texas Zeta	1926	Texas Christian University	Fort Worth, Texas		
North Carolina Beta	1926	Wake Forest University	Winston-Salem, North Carolina		
Texas Eta	1927	North Texas State Teachers College, Huntsville	Huntsville, Texas	Inactive	
Idaho Alpha	1927	College of Idaho	Caldwell, Idaho		
Texas Theta	1928	Simmons University	Boston, Massachusetts		
Illinois Lambda	1928–before 1963	Shurtleff College	Alton, Illinois	Inactive	(Note: The college closed in 1957.)
Virginia Alpha	1928–1950	Longwood College	Farmville, Virginia	Inactive	(Note: Chapter formed at the State Teachers College, later Longwood College, and now Longwood University.)
West Virginia Alpha	1928–1958	West Virginia Wesleyan College	Buckhannon, West Virginia	Inactive	
Wisconsin Gamma	1928–1952, 1957	University of Wisconsin–Oshkosh	Oshkosh, Wisconsin		(Note: Chapter formed at Oshkosh State Teachers College, now the University of Wisconsin–Oshkosh.)
Texas Iota	1928	Baylor University	Waco, Texas		
Iowa Nu	1929–before 1963	William Penn University	Oskaloosa, Iowa	Inactive	
Texas Kappa	1929–before 1963	Sam Houston State University	Huntsville, Texas	Inactive	
Mississippi Alpha	1929	Millsaps College	Jackson, Mississippi		
South Dakota Theta	1929–1934	Eastern State Teachers College	Madison, South Dakota	Inactive	
Illinois Mu	1930	Wheaton College	Wheaton, Illinois		
**Ohio Eta**	1930	Bowling Green State University	Bowling Green, Ohio	Active	
Louisiana Gamma	1930	University of Louisiana at Lafayette	Lafayette, Louisiana		(Note: Chapter formed at theSouthwestern Louisiana Institute of Liberal and Technical Learning, now the University of Louisiana at Lafayette.)
Missouri Theta	1930	Truman State University	Kirksville, Missouri		(Note: Chapter formed at Northeast Missouri State Teachers College, now Truman State University.)
Oklahoma Eta	1930	East Central University	Ada, Oklahoma		
Missouri Iota	1932	Southeast Missouri State University	Cape Girardeau, Missouri		(Note: Chapter formed at the Southeast Missouri State Teachers College, now Southeast Missouri State University.)
Missouri Kappa	1932	Northwest Missouri State University	Maryville, Missouri		
Arkansas Gamma	1932–before 1963	College of the Ozarks	Point Lookout, Missouri	Inactive	
Florida Alpha	1932–before 1963	Rollins College	Winter Park, Florida	Inactive	
Tennessee Gamma	1932	East Tennessee State University	Johnson City, Tennessee		
Illinois Nu	1932	Western Michigan University	Kalamazoo, Michigan		(Note: Chapter formed at Western State Teachers College, now Western Michigan University.)
Ohio Theta	1932–before 1963	University of Toledo	Toledo, Ohio	Inactive	
North Carolina Gamma	1932–1944	Asheville Normal and Teachers College	Asheville, North Carolina	Inactive	(Note: The chapter went inactive when the college closed in 1944.)
Oklahoma Theta	1932	Southeastern Oklahoma State College	Durant, Oklahoma		
Alabama Beta	1934	University of Montevallo	Montevallo, Alabama		(Note: Chapter formed at the Alabama College, State College for Women, now the University of Montevallo.)
Arizona Alpha	1934–before 1963	Arizona State College	Flagstaff, Arizona	Inactive	(Note: Chapter formed at Arizona State Teachers College at Flagstaff, later called Arizona State College and now Northern Arizona University.)
Illinois Xi	1934	Augustana College	Rock Island, Illinois		
Illinois Omicron	1934–1958	DePaul University	Chicago, Illinois	Inactive	
Illinois Pi	1934	Northern Illinois University	DeKalb, Illinois		(Note: Chapter formed at theNorthern Illinois State Teachers College, now Northern Illinois University.)
Michigan Eta	1934	University of Detroit Mercy	Detroit, Michigan		
Minnesota Eta	1934	Concordia College	Moorhead, Minnesota		
Mississippi Beta	1934	Mississippi State University	Starkville, Mississippi		
Missouri Lambda	1934	Missouri Valley College	Marshall, Missouri		
Ohio Iota	1934	Kent State University	Kent, Ohio		
Oklahoma Iota	1934	University of Central Oklahoma	Edmond, Oklahoma		(Note: Chapter formed at Central State Teachers College, now the University of Central Oklahoma.)
Texas Lambda	1934	Texas State University	San Marcos, Texas		(Note: Chapter formed at Southwest Texas State Teachers College, now Texas State University.)
Texas Mu	1934	Stephen F. Austin State University	Nacogdoches, Texas		
Michigan Theta	1934–1938	Battle Creek College	Berrien Springs, Michigan	Inactive	
South Carolina Delta	1936–before 1963	Winthrop University	Rock Hill, South Carolina	Inactive	
Iowa Xi	1936	Luther College	Decorah, Iowa		
Arizona Beta	1936	Arizona State University	Tempe, Arizona		(Note: Chapter formed at Arizona State Teachers College, now Arizona State University.)
Wisconsin Delta	1936	University of Wisconsin–River Falls	River Falls, Wisconsin		(Note: Chapter formed at the River Falls State Teachers College, now the University of Wisconsin–River Falls.)
Kansas Xi	1938	Bethel College	North Newton, Kansas		
Nebraska Eta	1938–before 1963	Chadron State College	Chadron, Nebraska	Inactive	(Note: Chapter formed at Nebraska State Teachers College, now Chadron State College.)
Pennsylvania Beta	1938–before 1963	Saint Vincent College	Latrobe, Pennsylvania	Inactive	
Georgia Alpha	1938–before 1963	Georgia College & State University	Milledgeville, Georgia	Inactive	(Note: Chapter formed at Georgia State College for Women, now Georgia College & State University.)
North Carolina Delta	1938	Lenoir–Rhyne University	Hickory, North Carolina		
Florida Beta	1938	Stetson University	DeLand, Florida		
Washington Beta	1940	Seattle Pacific University	Seattle, Washington		
Illinois Rho	1940	Principia College	Elsah, Illinois		
Nebraska Theta	1940	University of Nebraska Omaha	Omaha, Nebraska		
Tennessee Delta	1940	Tennessee Technological University	Cookeville, Tennessee		(Note: Chapter formed at theTennessee Polytechnic Institute, now Tennessee Technological University.)
Michigan Theta	1940	Central Michigan University	Mount Pleasant, Michigan		
Illinois Sigma	1940	Eastern Illinois University	Charleston, Illinois		(Note: Chapter formed at Eastern Illinois State Teachers College, now Eastern Illinois University.)
Tennessee Epsilon	1940	Carson–Newman University	Jefferson City, Tennessee		
South Carolina Epsilon	1940–before 1963	The Citadel	Charleston, South Carolina	Inactive	
Missouri Mu	1940	Tarkio College	Tarkio, Missouri	Inactive	(Note: The college closed in 1992.)
Kansas Omicron	1942	McPherson College	McPherson, Kansas		
Florida Gamma	1942	University of Miami	Coral Gables, Florida		
California Zeta	1942	Pepperdine University	Los Angeles County, California		
**Nebraska Iota**	1942	Wayne State College	Wayne, Nebraska	Active	
Illinois Tau	1942	Millikin University	Decatur, Illinois		
Illinois Upsilon	1942	Southern Illinois University Carbondale	Carbondale, Illinois		
Pennsylvania Gamma	1942	Seton Hill University	Greensburg, Pennsylvania		
Wisconsin Epsilon	1943	University of Wisconsin–Whitewater	Whitewater, Wisconsin		(Note: Chapter formed at Whitewater Teachers College, now the University of Wisconsin–Whitewater.)
Washington Gamma	1943–1944	Washington State University	Pullman, Washington	Inactive	
Louisiana Delta	1944	Louisiana Tech University	Ruston, Louisiana		(Note: Chapter formed at the Louisiana Polytechnic Institute, now Louisiana Tech University.)
Idaho Beta	1945–before 1963	Lewis–Clark State College	Lewiston, Idaho	Inactive	(Note: Chapter formed at the North Idaho Teachers College, now Lewis–Clark State College.)
Missouri Nu	1945	Drury University	Springfield, Missouri		
South Carolina Zeta	1947–1958	University of South Carolina	Columbia, South Carolina	Inactive	
Georgia Beta	1947–1958	University of Georgia	Athens, Georgia	Inactive	
Alabama Gamma	1947	Spring Hill College	Mobile, Alabama		
Texas Nu	1947	Texas A&M University–Kingsville	Kingsville, Texas		(Note: Chapter formed at the Texas College of Arts and Industries, now Texas A&M University–Kingsville.)
Nebraska Kappa	1948	Midland University	Fremont, Nebraska		
Missouri Xi	1948	Rockhurst University	Kansas City, Missouri		
Missouri Omicron	1948–1958	Saint Louis University	St. Louis, Missouri	Inactive	
Mississippi Gamma	1948	Mississippi University for Women	Columbus, Mississippi		
Arkansas Delta	1948	Arkansas State University	Jonesboro, Arkansas		
Illinois Phi	1948	Illinois College	Jacksonville, Illinois		
Minnesota Eta	1948	St. Catherine University	Saint Paul, Minnesota		
Oregon Beta	1948	Lewis & Clark College	Portland, Oregon		
Georgia Gamma	1948–1958	Georgia State University	Atlanta, Georgia	Inactive	
Washington Delta	1948	Whitworth University	Spokane, Washington		
Washington Epsilon	1949	Pacific Lutheran University	Parkland, Washington		
Idaho Gamma	1949	Idaho State University	Pocatello, Idaho		
California Eta	1949	San Diego State University	San Diego, California		
Maine Beta	1949	University of Maine	Orono, Maine		
Oklahoma Kappa	1949	Phillips University	Enid, Oklahoma		
Mississippi Delta	1949	University of Southern Mississippi	Hattiesburg, Mississippi		
West Virginia Beta	1950	Marshall University	Huntington, West Virginia		
Oklahoma Lambda	1950	Northeastern State University	Tahlequah, Oklahoma		
Wisconsin Zeta	1950–1956	Wisconsin State College of Milwaukee	Milwaukee, Wisconsin	Inactive	(Note: In 1956, the college became part of the University of Wisconsin, and subsequently the University of Wisconsin–Milwaukee's primary campus.)
Minnesota Theta	1950	Saint Mary's University of Minnesota	Winona, Minnesota		
Oklahoma Mu	1950	Southwestern Oklahoma State University	Weatherford, Oklahoma		
North Carolina Epsilon	1950	Appalachian State University	Boone, North Carolina		
Illinois Chi	1951	Greenville University	Greenville, Illinois		
Washington Zeta	1951	Western Washington University	Bellingham, Washington		
Louisiana Epsilon	1951	Northwestern State University	Natchitoches, Louisiana		
Tennessee Zeta	1952	Middle Tennessee State University	Murfreesboro, Tennessee		
Tennessee Eta	1952	Sewanee: The University of the South	Sewanee, Tennessee		
Washington Eta	1952	Saint Martin's University	Lacey, Washington		
California Theta	1953	Pasadena City College	Pasadena, California		
Texas Xi	1953	Abilene Christian University	Abilene, Texas		
California Iota	1955	California State University, Chico	Chico, California		(Note: Chapter formed at Chico State College, now California State University, Chico.)
California Kappa	1955	Upland			
Arkansas Epsilon	1955–1958	Southern State College	Magnolia, Arkansas	Inactive	
Louisiana Zeta	1955	Southeastern Louisiana University	Hammond, Louisiana		
California Lambda	1955	University of California, Los Angeles	Los Angeles, Califonria		
Illinois Theta	1955	McKendree University	Lebanon, Illinois		
South Dakota Iota	1955	University of South Dakota	Vermillion, South Dakota		
Washington Theta	1955	Whitman College	Walla Walla, Washington		
Texas Omicron	1955	University of Houston	Houston, Texas		
West Virginia Gamma	1956	University of Charleston	Charleston, West Virginia		(Note: Chapter formed at Morris Harvey College, now the University of Charleston.)
Tennessee Theta	1956	Lipscomb University	Nashville, Tennessee		(Note: Chapter formed at David Lipscomb College, now Lipscomb University.)
Illinois Psi	1956	University of Illinois Chicago	Chicago, Illinois		
California Mu	1956	California State Polytechnic University, Humboldt	Arcata, California		(Note: Chapter formed at Humboldt State College, now California State Polytechnic University, Humboldt.)
California Nu	1956	California State University, Fresno	Fresno, California		(Note: Chapter formed at Fresno State College, now California State University, Fresno.)
South Dakota Kappa	1956–19xx ?	University of South Dakota–Springfield	Springfield, South Dakota	Inactive	(Note: Chapter formed at Southern State College, which became the University of South Dakota–Springfield and ceased operations in 1984.)
Texas Pi	1956	St. Mary's University, Texas	San Antonio, Texas		
Colorado Delta	1956	Adams State University	Alamosa, Colorado		
California Xi	1957	Loyola University New Orleans	New Orleans, Louisiana		
Kansas Pi	1957	Tabor College	Hillsboro, Kansas		
Wisconsin Gamma	1957–19xx ?; 196x ?	University of Wisconsin–Oshkosh	Oshkosh, Wisconsin		
Oregon Gamma	1957	Portland State University	Portland, Oregon		
Montana Gamma	1957	Montana State University Billings	Billings, Montana		(Note: Chapter formed at the Eastern Montana College of Education, now Montana State University Billings.)
Arkansas Zeta	1957	Harding University	Searcy, Arkansas		
Mississippi Epsilon	1958	Mississippi College	Clinton, Mississippi		
Idaho Delta	1958	Northwest Nazarene University	Nampa, Idaho		
Missouri Kappa	1958	Northwest Missouri State University	Maryville, Missouri		
Florida Beta	1958	Stetson University	DeLand, Florida		
Louisiana Eta	1958	McNeese State University	Lake Charles, Louisiana		
Minnesota Iota	1958	University of Minnesota Duluth	Duluth, Minnesota		
Oklahoma Nu	1959	Oklahoma Panhandle State University	Goodwell, Oklahoma		(Note: Chapter formed at thePanhandle Agricultural and Mechanical College, now Oklahoma Panhandle State University.)
Kentucky Epsion	1959	University of Louisville	Louisville, Kentucky		
Ohio Kappa	1959	University of Findlay	Findlay, Ohio		
Kansas Iota	1959	College of Emporia	Emporia, Kansas		
California Omicron	1960	California State University, Northridge	Los Angeles, California		(Note: Chapter formed atSan Fernando Valley State College, now California State University, Northridge.)
Ohio Lambda	1960	University of Dayton	Dayton, Ohio		
Texas Phi	1960	Lamar University	Beaumont, Texas		
Michigan Iota	1960	Ferris State University	Big Rapids, Michigan		
Missouri Pi	1960	University of Missouri–Kansas City	Kansas City, Missouri		
Montana Delta	1960	Carroll College	Helena, Montana		
South Carolina Lambda	1960	South Dakota School of Mines and Technology	Rapid City, South Dakota		
Mississippi Zeta	1961	Delta State University	Cleveland, Mississippi		
Arizona Gamma	1961	University of Arizona	Tucson, Arizona		
Texas Chi	1961	Midwestern State University	Wichita Falls, Texas		
Texas Psi	1961	University of Texas at El Paso	El Paso, Texas		(Note: Chapter formed at Texas Western College of the University of Texas, now the University of Texas at El Paso.)
Connecticut Beta	1962	Southern Connecticut State University	New Haven, Connecticut		
Illinois Omega	1962	Olivet Nazarene University	Bourbonnais, Illinois		
Michigan Kappa	1962	Northern Michigan University	Marquette, Michigan		
Pennsylvania Delta	1962	Commonwealth University-Bloomsburg	Bloomsburg, Pennsylvania		
Texas Omega	1962	West Texas A&M University	Canyon, Texas		
Old Dominion University	1962 Virginia Beta	Norfolk, Virginia			
Colorado Epsilon	1963	Colorado State University Pueblo	Pueblo, Colorado		(Note: Chapter formed at Southern Colorado State College, now Colorado State University Pueblo.)
Illinois Alpha Alpha	1963	Elmhurst University	Elmhurst, Illinois		
Ohio Mu	1963	University of Mount Union	Alliance, Ohio		
Wisconsin Eta	1963	University of Wisconsin–Platteville	Platteville, Wisconsin		
California Rho	1964	California State Polytechnic University, Pomona	Pomona, California		
New Mexico Alpha	1964	New Mexico State University	Las Cruces, New Mexico		
Ohio Nu	1964	Youngstown State University	Youngstown, Ohio		
Pennsylvania Eta	1964	PennWest Clarion	Clarion, Pennsylvania		(Note: Chapter formed at Clarion University of Pennsylvania, now PennWest Clarion.)
Pennsylvania Zeta	1964	PennWest California	California, Pennsylvania		(Note: Chapter formed at California State College, now PennWest California)
Tennessee Iota	1964	Tennessee Wesleyan University	Athens, Tennessee		
Vermont Alpha	1964	Norwich University	Northfield, Vermont		
Arkansas Eta	1965	University of Central Arkansas	Conway, Arkansas		(Note: Chapter formed at Arkansas State Teachers College, now University of Central Arkansas.)
Minnesota Kappa	1965	Minnesota State University Moorhead	Moorhead, Minnesota		
New York Alpha	1965	Ithaca College	Ithaca, New York		
Texas Alpha Alpha	1965	Texas A&M University	College Station, Texas		
Wisconsin Iota	1965	University of Wisconsin–Superior	Superior, Wisconsin		
Wisconsin Kappa	1965	University of Wisconsin–Stout	Menomonie, Wisconsin		
California Tau	1966	California State University, East Bay	Hayward, California		(Note: Chapter formed at California State College at Hayward, now California State University, East Bay.)
California Upsilon	1966	University of California, Berkeley	Berkeley, California		
**Maryland Alpha**	1966	Towson University	Towson, Maryland	Active	
Missouri Rho	1966	Evangel University	Springfield, Missouri		
New Mexico Beta	1966	State University of New York at Geneseo	Geneseo, New York		
Texas Alpha Beta	1966	Texas Lutheran University	Seguin, Texas		
Texas Alpha Gamma	1966	McMurry University	Abilene, Texas		
Illinois Alpha Gamma	1967	Southern Illinois University Edwardsville	Edwardsville, Illinois		
North Dakota Delta	1967	North Dakota State University	Fargo, North Dakota		
Ohio Xi	1967	Ohio Northern University	Ada, Ohio		
Pennsylvania Zeta	1967	East Stroudsburg University	East Stroudsburg, Pennsylvania		
California Chi	1969	California State University, Stanislaus	Turlock, California		
Iowa Pi	1969	Northwestern College	Orange City, Iowa		
Minnesota Mu	1969	Southwest Minnesota State University	Marshall, Minnesota		
Missouri Sigma	1969	Southwest Baptist University	Bolivar, Missouri		
Montana Epsilon	1969	Great Falls College Montana State University	Great Falls, Montana		
New York Delta	1969	SUNY Brockport	Brockport, New York		
North Dakota Epsilon	1969	Mayville State University	Mayville, North Dakota		
Pennsylvania Iota	1969	West Chester University	West Chester, Pennsylvania		
Pennsylvania Kappa	1969	Commonwealth University-Lock Haven	Lock Haven, Pennsylvania		(Note: Chapter formed at Lock Haven State College, now Commonwealth University-Lock Haven.)
Texas Alpha Delta	1969	Houston Christian University	Houston, Texas		
Washington Kappa	1969	Eastern Washington University	Cheney, Washington		
Wisconsin Lambda	1969	University of Wisconsin–La Crosse	La Crosse, Wisconsin		
Wisconsin Mu	1969	University of Wisconsin–Stevens Point	Stevens Point, Wisconsin		
Connecticut Gamma	1971	Central Connecticut State University	New Britain, Connecticut		
Georgia Delta	1971	Georgia Southern University	Statesboro, Georgia		
Idaho Epsilon	1971	Boise State University	Boise, Idaho		
Louisiana Theta	1971	University of Louisiana at Monroe	Monroe, Louisiana		(Note: Chapter formed at Northeast Louisiana University, now the University of Louisiana at Monroe.)
Maryland Beta	1971	Frostburg State University	Frostburg, Maryland		
Massachusetts Beta	1971	Bridgewater State University	Bridgewater, Massachusetts		
Michigan Mu	1971	Adrian College	Adrian, Michigan		
Minnesota Nu	1971	Bethel Universities	Arden Hills, Minnesota		
Minnesota Xi	1971	Winona State University	Winona, Minnesota		
New Jersey Alpha	1971	Monmouth University	West Long Branch, New Jersey		
New Jersey Beta	1971	New Jersey Institute of Technology	Newark, New Jersey		
Pennsylvania Lambda	1971	Commonwealth University-Mansfield	Mansfield, Pennsylvania		(Note: Chapter formed at Mansfield University of Pennsylvania, now Commonwealth University-Mansfield.)
Tennessee Kappa	1971	Tennessee State University	Nashville, Tennessee		
Texas Alpha Epsilon	1971	Angelo State University	San Angelo, Texas		
Arkansas Theta	1973	University of Arkansas	Fayetteville, Arkansas		
Mississippi Eta	1973	William Carey University	Hattiesburg, Mississippi		
Montana Eta	1973	Montana Technological University	Butte, Montana		(Note: Chapter formed at the Montana College of Mineral Science and Technology, now Montana Technological University.)
Montana Zeta	1973	University of Montana	Missoula, Montana		
New York Epsilon	1973	State University of New York at Plattsburgh	Plattsburgh, New York		
Ohio Rho	1973	University of Rio Grande	Rio Grande, Ohio		
Ohio Sigma	1973	Wright State University	Fairborn, Ohio		
Tennessee Lambda	1973	Austin Peay State University	Clarksville, Tennessee		
West Virginia Delta	1973	Shepherd University	Shepherdstown, West Virginia		
New York Zeta	1974	Hunter College	New York City, New York		
Tennessee Mu	1974	Trevecca Nazarene University	Nashville, Tennessee		
New Jersey Gamma	1975	The College of New Jersey	Ewing Township, New Jersey		(Note: Chapter formed at Trenton State College, now The College of New Jersey.)
Oklahoma Omicron	1975	Cameron University	Lawton, Oklahoma		
Pennsylvania Nu	1975	PennWest Edinboro	Edinboro, Pennsylvania		(Note: Chapter formed at Edinboro State College, now PennWest Edinboro.)
Pennsylvania Xi	1975	Shippingburg University	Shippensburg, Pennsylvania		
Tennessee Nu	1975	Fisk University	Nashville, Tennessee		
Alabama Delta	1976	Troy University	Troy, Alabama		
Arkansas Iota	1976	University of Arkansas	Fayetteville, Arkansas		
Connecticut Delta	1976	United States Coast Guard Academy	New London, Connecticut		
Kansas Eta	1976	St. Mary of the Plains College	Dodge City, Kansas	Inactive	(Note: The college closed in 1992.)
Louisiana Iota	1976	Louisiana State University	Baton Rouge, Louisiana		
New York Pi	1976	St. Francis College	Brooklyn, New York		
New York Theta	1976	College of Saint Rose	Albany, New York		
Pennsylvania Omicron	1976	Wilkes University	Wilkes-Barre, Pennsylvania		
Missouri Tau	1977	Missouri Western State University	St. Joseph, Missouri		
Pennsylvania Pi	1977	York College of Pennsylvania	Spring Garden Township, Pennsylvania		
		Hillsdale College	Hillsdale, Michigan	Active	
