= Avian vacuolar myelinopathy =

Avian vacuolar myelinopathy (AVM) is a fatal neurological disease that affects various waterbirds and raptors. It is most common in the bald eagle and American coot, and it is known in the killdeer, bufflehead, northern shoveler, American wigeon, Canada goose, great horned owl, mallard, and ring-necked duck. Avian vacuolar myelinopathy is a newly discovered disease that was first identified in the field in 1994 when dead bald eagles were found near DeGray Lake in Arkansas in the United States. Since then, it has spread to four more states and infested multiple aquatic systems including 10 reservoirs. The cause of death is lesions on the brain and spinal cord. A neurotoxin called aetokthonotoxin produced by cyanobacteria causes the disease.

== Clinical signs ==
Clinical signs have been recorded from research studies where individual birds were intentionally given the disease and from wild specimens and dead birds recovered from the field.

- Raptors have been seen flying into objects, such as trees and rock faces
- Waterfowl swim awkwardly, sometimes on their backs
- Lack of coordination in flying and walking, sometimes dragging wings or one leg
- Waterfowl crash land into water
- Tremors of the head
- Weight loss
- Unresponsiveness to noise
- Limb weakness
- Beak and tongue weakness
- Decreased pain response

== Causative agent ==
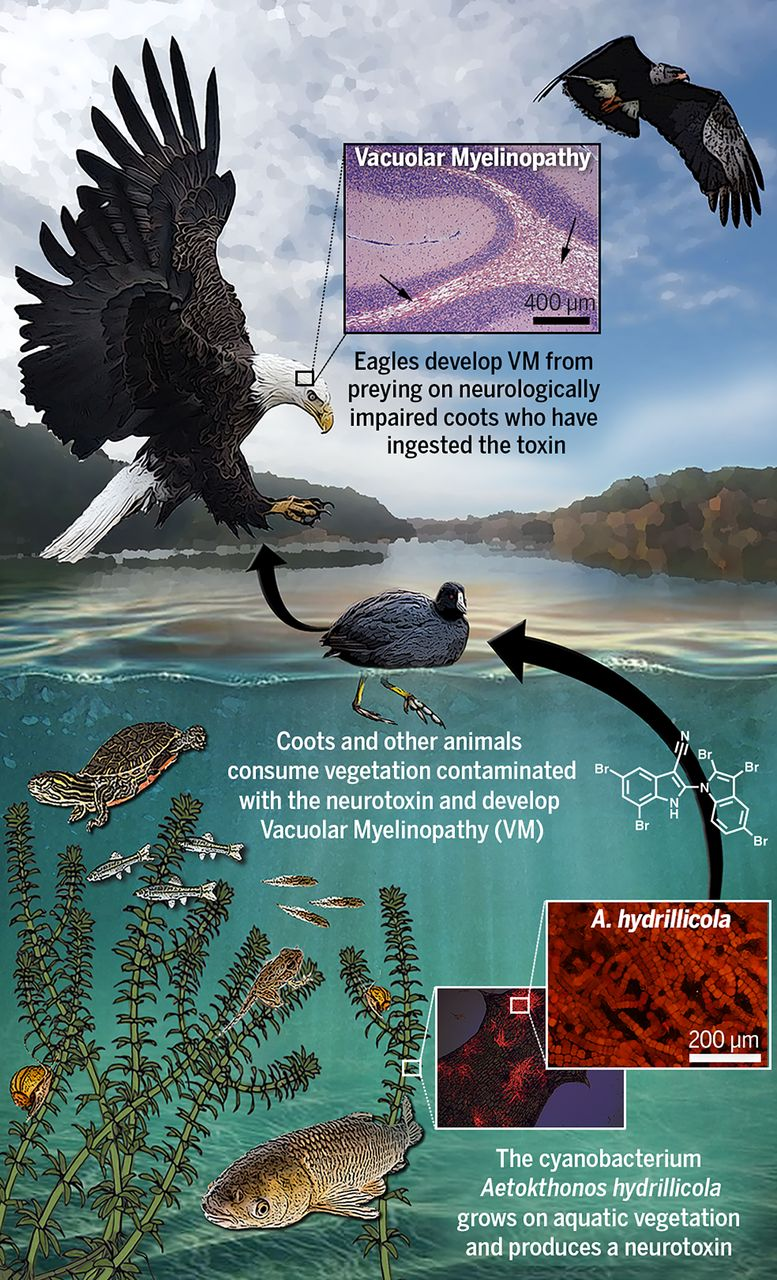
Transmission from cyanobacteria to the bald eagle

In 2021, researchers found that the cause of the disease is a neurotoxin produced by the cyanobacterium Aetokthonos hydrillicola. This particular cyanobacterium grows very well on the invasive species hydrilla (Hydrilla verticillata), covering 20–90% of leaf surfaces. These invasive hydrilla plants often take over any aquatic system to which they are introduced. Waterfowl then consume the hydrilla, ingesting the cyanobacteria. Some raptors, like bald eagles, prey upon the diseased waterfowl and contract identical clinical symptoms from consuming toxin-containing tissues. The toxin causes widespread vacuolation of the white matter of the brain and spinal cord of intoxicated birds.

== Research highlights ==
Birrenkott et al. (2004) attempted a study in 2004 to determine linkage between the invasive aquatic plant Hydrilla verticillata and the outbreak of AVM among waterfowl after it was observed that only lakes containing excess amounts of hydrilla harbored infected birds. In this study, adult mallards and northern bobwhites were divided by species into multiple sections to observe the effects of hydrilla when it was ingested by the birds, and also by physical contact or drinking of water containing hydrilla. The results of this study found that drinking water or physical contact with hydrilla or areas in which it was present had no noticeable effect on test birds. However, when fed a diet of over 50% hydrilla, the birds developed AVM. Wilde et al. (2005) performed a study to determine the cause of AVM by conducting food trials in areas affected by AVM. Disease-free mallards were fed cyanobacteria from hydrilla and observed daily. Birds that developed symptoms were captured and euthanized. By the conclusion of the study, 15 of the 20 study mallards had been recovered, and all had AVM. In 2021, after 25 years of research on this disease, its cause was finally identified to be a novel tryptophan derived alkaloid called aetokthonotoxin that is produced by the aforementioned bacteria.
