= Hydrellia valida =

Scientific classification
- Kingdom: Animalia
- Phylum: Arthropoda
- Class: Insecta
- Order: Diptera
- Family: Ephydridae
- Subfamily: Hydrelliinae
- Tribe: Hydrelliini
- Genus: Hydrellia
- Species: H. valida

Binomial name
- Hydrellia valida Loew, 1862

Species of fly

Hydrellia valida is a species of shore flies in the family Ephydridae.

== Distribution ==
United States.
