= Amity High School (Oregon) =

Public school in Amity, Oregon, United States

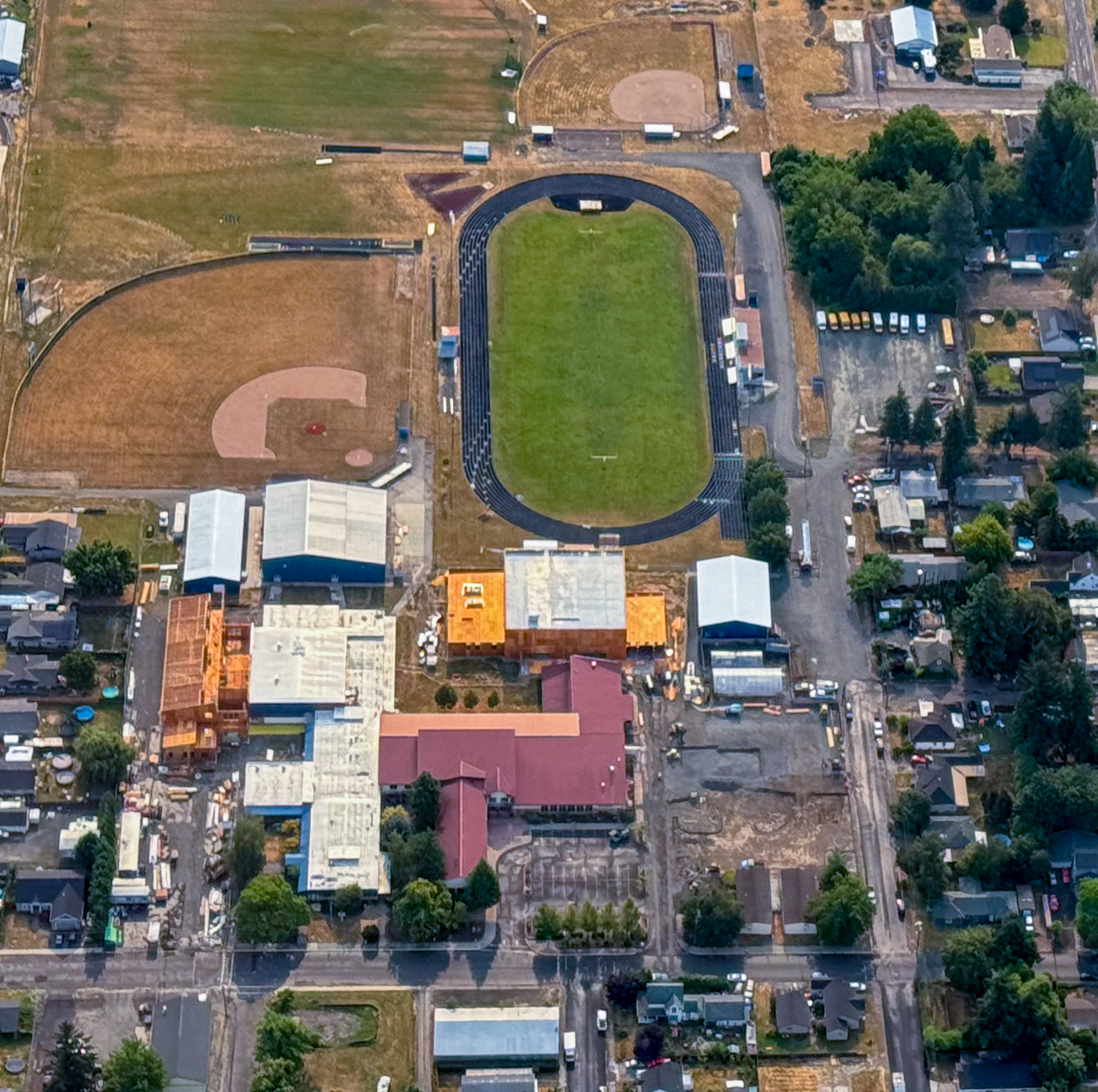

Location
- 503 Oak Street; Amity, (Yamhill County), Oregon 97101; United States; 45.116178°N 123.203044°W

Information
- Type: Public
- School district: Amity School District
- Principal: Ryan Stika
- Teaching staff: 18.77 (FTE)
- Grades: 9-12
- Enrollment: 256 (2023–2024)
- Student to teacher ratio: 13.64
- Campus: Rural
- Colors: Royal blue and white
- Athletics conference: OSAA Pac West League 3A-2
- Mascot: Warrior
- Rival: Dayton High School (Oregon)
- Website: Amity HS website

Amity High School is a public high school in Amity, Oregon, United States.

== Academics ==
In 2008, 86% of the school's seniors received a high school diploma. Of 66 students, 57 graduated, seven dropped out, and two received a modified diploma.

== Community ==
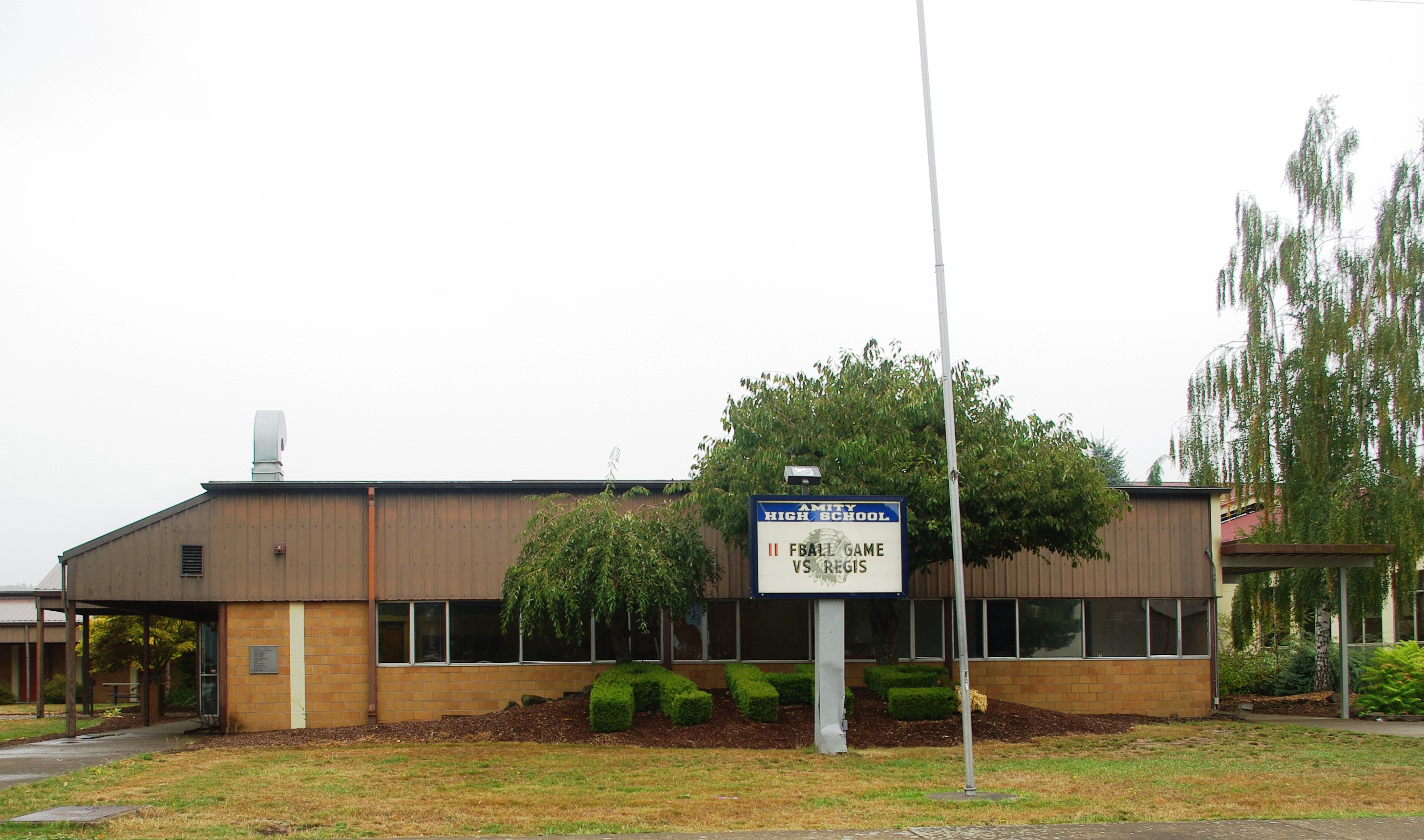
School front

Since 1995, the high school has put on an annual spring community event called The Daffodil Festival to let students get the first-hand experience in hospitality and tourism.

Amity also annually puts on a May Day celebration that has been in practice since 1924.

== Athletics ==
Amity High School athletic teams compete in the OSAA 3A-3 PacWest Conference.

=== Football team success ===
During a 6 year stretch between 1998-2003 Amity's football team made it to the 2A State championship game every year winning 5. During this period the team accrued a record of 75-3.

=== State Championships ===
- Baseball: 1947
- Boys' basketball: 1938
- Football: 1947, 1998, 1999, 2000, 2001, 2003, 2009
