= DeGray Lake =

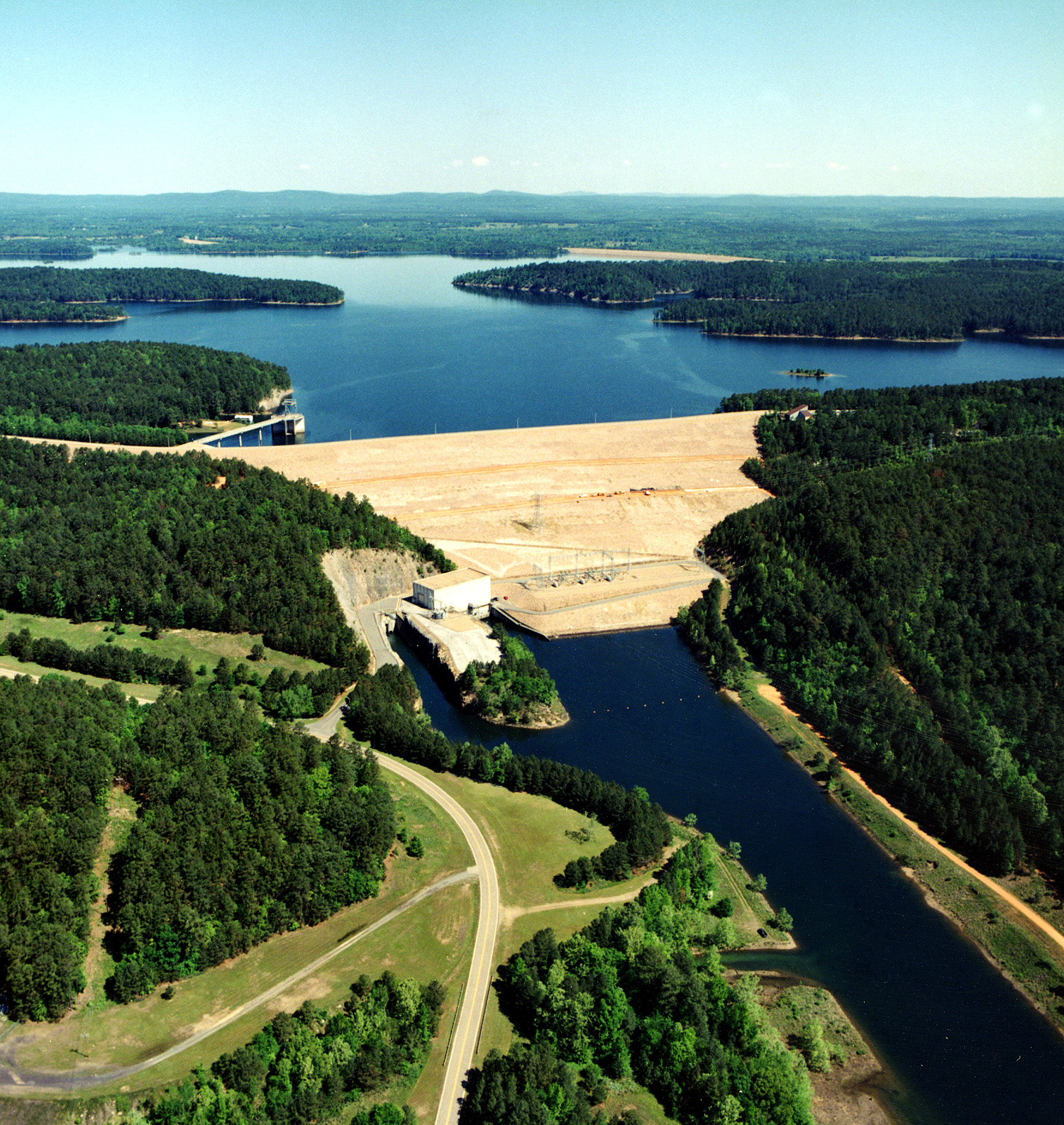
- Dam and Lake

- Location within Arkansas
- Location: Clark / Hot Spring counties, Arkansas, United States
- Coordinates: 34°12′53″N 93°06′41″W
- Type: Reservoir
- Primary inflows: Caddo River
- Primary outflows: Caddo River
- Basin countries: United States
- Surface area: 13,800 acres (5,600 ha)
- Average depth: 47 ft (14 m)
- Max. depth: 200 ft (61 m)
- Shore length^{1}: 207 mi (333 km)
- ^{1} Shore length is not a well-defined measure.

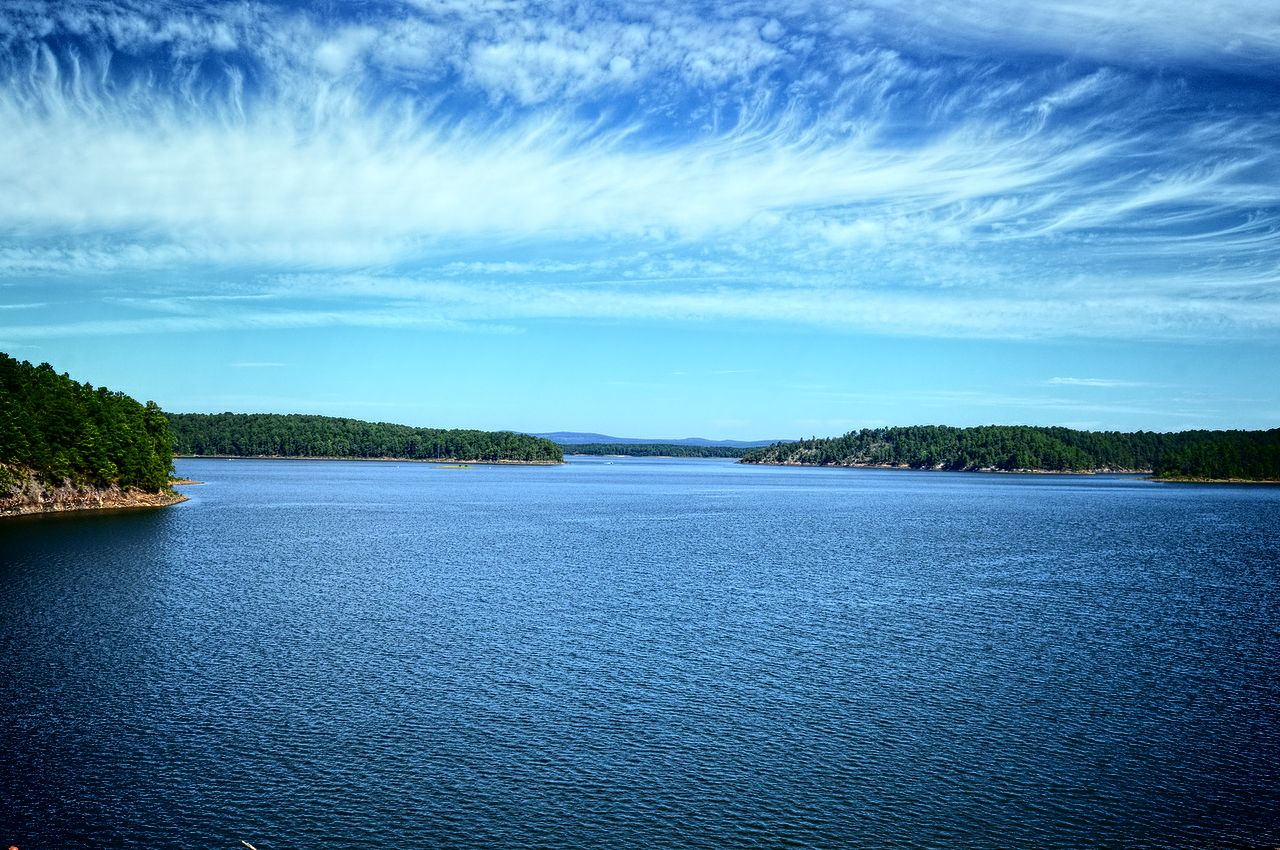
DeGray Lake

DeGray Lake is a reservoir on the Caddo River constructed by the United States Army Corps of Engineers in Arkansas, 8 miles (13 km) from Arkadelphia. Arkansas Scenic Byway 7 is located on the eastern shore of the lake, and provides views of the lake, and also places to stay. DeGray Lake Resort State Park was opened in 1974 to encourage tourism and recreation on DeGray Lake.

The DeGray Dam project, encompassing flood-control, power, and water-supply features is located in northern Clark County, Arkansas on the Caddo River approximately eight miles above its confluence with the Ouachita River. The project plan for DeGray Lake included the construction of the DeGray Dam with a height of 240 feet above the Caddo River, a dike that splits the Caddo River and Bayou de Roche, an outlet works, an uncontrolled spillway, and a powerhouse.

== History ==
=== Prehistory ===
The documented history of the DeGray area dates back to AD 700 when the area was inhabited by the Caddo Indians. Caddo is believed to be a shortened version of the Indian word "kadohadacho", which was used to identify the large family of tribes living in southwest Arkansas, northwest Louisiana, and northeast Texas. Historians believe there were at least 12 tribes in this confederation that usually settled along streambanks. Hernando de Soto then came and explored this area in 1541, after discovering hot springs. The Caddo Indians' way of life was changed forever when coming in contact with the Spanish explorers; the Indians were introduced to the horse. The Caddo excelled in pottery making and many fine examples of their work are in private collections in the area. The Caddo had formal religious, social, and economic beliefs and believed in an afterlife. Each subtribes had its own chief and village consisting of straw lodges. Their society valued honesty, hospitality, and neighborliness. The Caddo were farmers growing corn, squash, pumpkins and beans and they supplemented their diet by gathering food in the woods (berries, nuts, etc.,) and by hunting and fishing. The University of Arkansas has made a survey of known archaeological sites within the reservoir area. Fourteen sites were discovered and investigated. An extensive dig was made at the Powell site, a Temple Mound in Clark County. Many artifacts and significant archaeological data were located. In the 18th century French fur trappers brought trade to the area with their extensive trapping methods. DeGray Lake was in fact named after a French fur trader, DeGraff, who settled this region. Several artifacts have been found near the dam site, and many have been brought to a local university, Henderson State University.

=== Dam construction ===
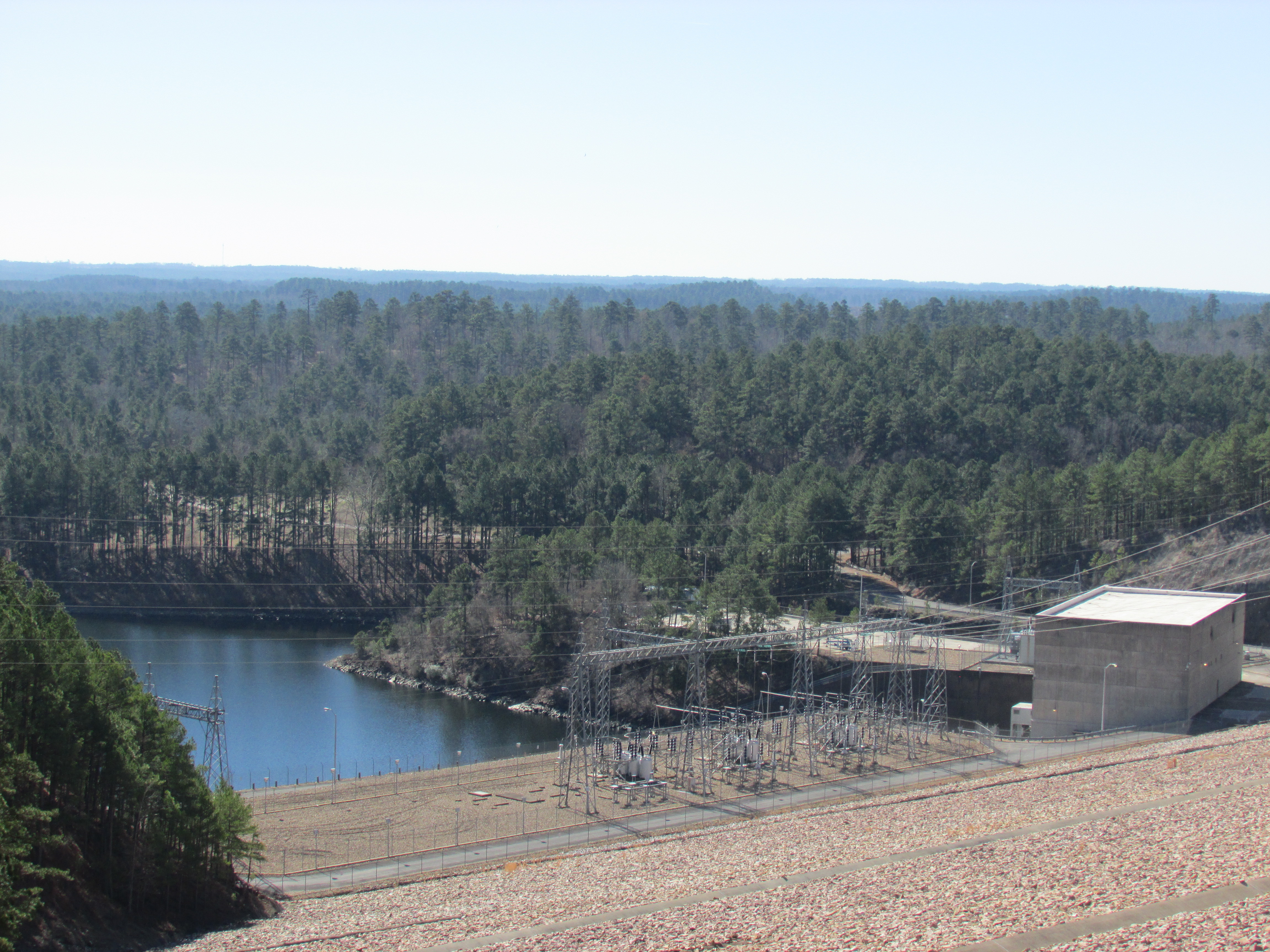
DeGray Power Plant

DeGray lake and dam were authorized by Congress in the River and Harbor Act of 1950. Congress passed the Water Supply Act of 1958, which provided for the inclusion of municipal and industrial water supply as one of the project purposes. Construction on the dam began in 1962 and was completed in 1972 at a cost of US$63.8 million (equivalent to US$491 million in 2025). A 40 MW hydraulic turbine and a 28 MW turbine generate electricity for the Southwestern Power Administration of Arkansas, Texas, and Oklahoma. DeGray dam impounds the waters of the Caddo River to form a flood control lake that covers 13,400 acres (5,400 ha), and a shoreline of 207 mi (333 km).

Many of the long-time residents recall families in the area who were "bought out" in order to fill area behind the dam. Residents were offered money for their property, so that the lake could be built. The eventual damming of the Caddo River forced many people to move elsewhere in the area. Brick and concrete structures from former homesteads still stand on the bottom of the lake, whereas the remains of others can be found in selected areas near the shoreline.

Although recreation plays a major role in every day activity, hydropower makes this lake one of the most efficient and energy producing projects in the South. DeGray Lake holds the distinction as the first "pump back capable" impoundment in the history of the Corps of Engineers. A re-regulation dam forms a 400-acre impoundment directly below the main lake that serves as a storage basin for pump back capable features. During designated times, i.e. drought, the 28,000 KW generator can be reversed pulling water out of the Lower Lake into the main lake to be utilized again for hydropower generation. The 400-acre Lower Lake also serves as an ideal waterfowl refuge.

== Flora and fauna ==
=== Fauna ===
DeGray Lake supports a variety of game and non-game wildlife. Squirrels and rabbits predominate as upland game. Deer, beaver, turkey, raccoon, armadillo, quail, and doves are found in moderate numbers. Very few waterfowl nest along the Caddo River, but the lake will provide a resting stop for migratory birds. A variety of songbirds with other birds, such as hawks, owl, herons, and vultures, are either permanent residents or migrate through the DeGray area. Bald eagles have been sighted on the lake during the winter months. The lake has inundated habitats that once supported deer, squirrel, beaver, and wild turkey. Management of peripheral lands have determined whether these remaining habitats are destroyed either through structural or human invasion. The hardwood forest is unique to the area, and this habitat will be preserved. Cleared lands will be maintained as existing habitat for deer, quail, dove, and rabbits. Large tracts of land, not suited for recreational development, will be set aside to preserve wildlife habitats, both for hunting purposes and the encouragement of non-game species.

DeGray Lake, with 13,420 surface acres at full power pool has the potential for providing a substantial annual sport fishery. In addition to natural fisheries recruitment from original Caddo River populations, the Arkansas Game and Fish Commission initiated a supplemental fish stocking program in 1969. Black bass, channel catfish, flathead catfish, blue catfish, red-ear, bluegill, crappie, and white bass were stocked followed by stockings of shad for forage supplement. To provide sport fishing variety and to supplement the predator population, exotic species (walleye, northern pike and muskellunge) were also stocked. Fish populations in DeGray Lake are still in the growth period and have not yet reached full potential. However, good bass, bream, and crappie fishing has been realized. Some catches of northern pike have been reported but the fate of the walleye and muskellunge stockings is unknown. Because of their similarity, some of the northern pike reported caught may have actually been muskellunge. Sampling efforts have not indicated that any of the exotic species are reproducing in the lake. Maintenance of the remaining downstream warm-water ecosystem is possible as a result of the multilevel intake structure in the dam. This structure can selectively withdraw water from a vertical range of nearly 60 feet, thereby allowing withdrawals to occur from strata of desired temperature. The 90-acre reregulating pool below most hydroelectric systems. As a result, smallmouth and rock bass, warmouth, red-ear sunfish, and channel catfish are caught on the lower Caddo River.

== Recreation opportunities ==
=== Recreation ===
The U.S. Army Corps of Engineers owns and operates nine campgrounds, two playgrounds, five swim areas, several miles of biking trails, five miles of hiking trails, as well as eleven boat ramps. Island camping at DeGray is prohibited but is allowed at Lake Ouchita. DeGray Lake offers a variety of day use facilities and locations throughout the project. Pavilions are located at Hwy 7, Lower Lake, Caddo Drive, and Arlie Moore. USACE also offers a conference hall. DeGray State Park also shares shoreline on the USACE operated lake. The state park offers many recreational opportunities as well. It offers interpretive tours at sunset, guided hikes, and many more interpretive activities.

=== Hunting ===
All applicable hunting laws are in effect while hunting on DeGray. Arkansas Game and Fish Commission issues licenses and tags for applicable game. Some game DeGray offers to hunt include quail, duck, geese, rabbit, squirrel, bear, turkey, and deer being the most popular. The USACE rangers offer several hunting events during the year for various type of game. Corps of Engineers have Youth Permit Hunt Applications or Mobility-Impaired Waterfowl Hunt Permit Applications at their project office. Hunting is prohibited in all recreation areas and only allowed in designated areas of the WMA.

=== Fishing ===
DeGray Lake is known for its hybrid stripers, crappie, largemouth bass, and catfish.

In 2007, AGFC and USACE introduced the Pakistani fly to control hydrilla in DeGray Lake. The fly larvae were supposed to eat the tops off hydrilla plants down to a depth where it would decrease total plant coverage. The architects of this scheme did not foresee several years of drought, which combined with the introduced fly, wiped out DeGray's hydrilla. Largemouth bass recruitment suffered as a result. In an attempt to rejuvenate the lake, AGFC partnered in 2019 with the University of Arkansas at Pine Bluff Aquaculture and Fisheries to restore the native vegetation.

== Local impact ==
=== Economic impact ===
DeGray Lake's impact is important for the local economy of SW Arkansas. Including all entities on DeGray Lake; USACE, DeGray State Park, Iron Mountain Marina, and other private leases DeGray Lake generated as of fiscal year 2016 $23,502,958 in visitor spending within 30 miles of Corps property, $13,089,995 in sales within 30 miles of corps property, and 220 jobs. The money spent by visitors to Corps lakes on trip expenses adds to the local and national economy by supporting jobs and generating income. Visitor spending represents a sizable component of the economy in many communities around DeGray.

== See also ==
- List of Arkansas dams and reservoirs
