= Hydrellia geniculata =

Scientific classification
- Kingdom: Animalia
- Phylum: Arthropoda
- Class: Insecta
- Order: Diptera
- Family: Ephydridae
- Subfamily: Hydrelliinae
- Tribe: Hydrelliini
- Genus: Hydrellia
- Species: H. geniculata

Binomial name
- Hydrellia geniculata (Stenhammar, 1844)

Synonyms
- Notiphila geniculata Stenhammar, 1844; Hydrellia algentivultus Miyagi, 1977

Species of fly

Hydrellia geniculata is a species of fly in the family Ephydridae.

== Distribution ==
Austria, Italy, Japan, Sweden.
