= Aetokthonotoxin =

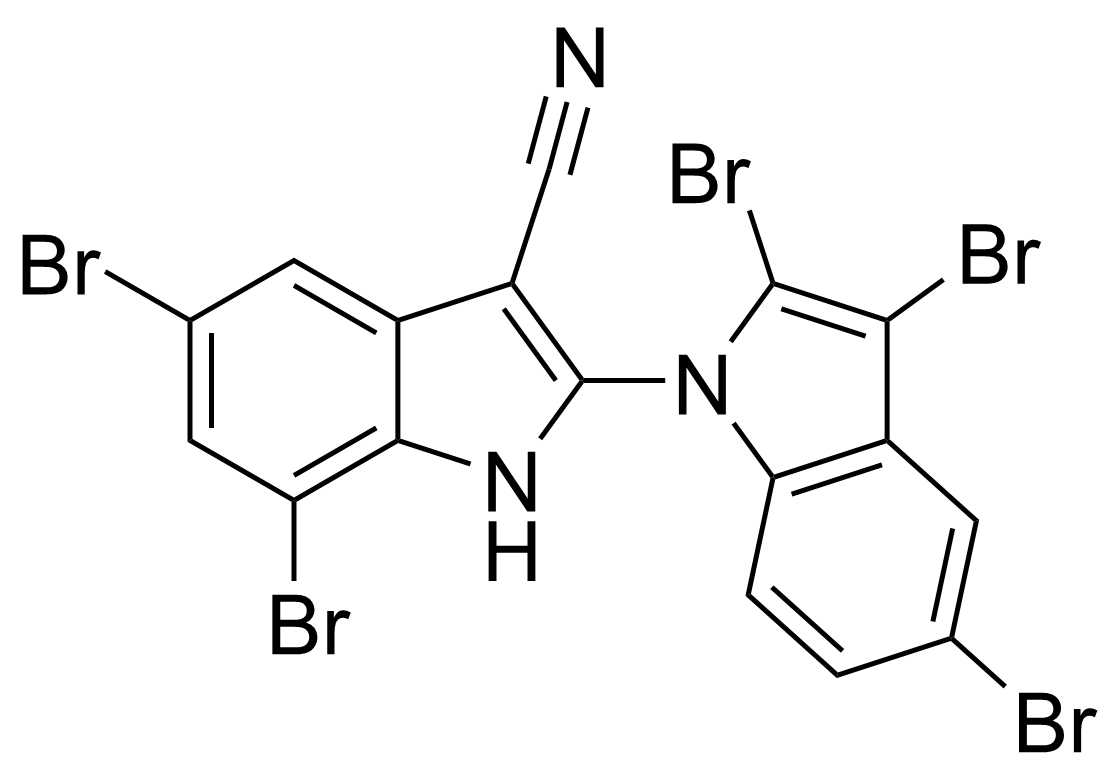

Names
- IUPAC name 5,7-Dibromo-2-(2,3,5-tribromoindol-1-yl)-1H-indole-3-carbonitrile

Identifiers
| 3D model (JSmol) | Interactive image |
| ChEBI | CHEBI:167886 |
| ChemSpider | 128706732 |
| PubChem CID | 155818808 |
- InChI: InChI=1S/C17H6Br5N3/c18-7-1-2-13-10(3-7)14(21)16(22)25(13)17-11(6-23)9-4-8(19)5-12(20)15(9)24-17/h1-5,24H Key: JXJDQKCOJBAPQM-UHFFFAOYSA-N
- SMILES: C1=CC2=C(C=C1Br)C(=C(N2C3=C(C4=C(N3)C(=CC(=C4)Br)Br)C#N)Br)Br

Properties
| Chemical formula | C_{17}H_{6}Br_{5}N_{3} |
| Molar mass | 651.776 g·mol^{−1} |
- Except where otherwise noted, data are given for materials in their standard state (at 25 °C [77 °F], 100 kPa). Infobox references

Aetokthonotoxin (AETX), colloquially known as eagle-killer toxin, is a chemical compound that was identified in 2021 as the cyanobacterial neurotoxin causing vacuolar myelinopathy (VM) in eagles in North America. As the biosynthesis of aetokthonotoxin depends on the availability of bromide ions in freshwater systems and requires an interplay between the toxin-producing cyanobacterium Aetokthonos hydrillicola and the host plant it requires to live (Hydrilla verticillata), it took more than 25 years to identify aetokthonotoxin as the VM-inducing toxin after the disease has first been diagnosed in bald eagles in 1994. The toxin cascades through the food-chain: Among other animals, it builds up in fish and waterfowl such as coots or ducks which feed on hydrilla colonized with the cyanobacterium. Aetokthonotoxin is transmitted to raptors, such as the bald eagle, as they prey on AETX poisoned animals. The total synthesis of AETX was achieved in 2021, the enzymatic functions of the 5 enzymes involved in AETX biosynthesis were described in 2022.

== Biosynthesis ==
The enzymatic pathway used to assemble AETX from tryptophan

The biosynthesis of AETX and the functions of the enzymes AetA, AetB, AetD, AetE, and AetF were described in 2022. AetF, a FAD-dependent halogenase, brominates L-tryptophan at the 5 position. The 5-bromo-L-tryptophan can then undergo two separate reactions. One route involves a second bromination by AetF at position 7 to yield 5,7-dibromo-L-tryptophan. This molecule then goes on to react with AetD, an iron-dependent nitrile synthase, to form an indole-3-carbonitrile derivative. The second route taken by the 5-bromo-L-tryptophan starting material involves the tryptophanase AetE, which cleaves 5-bromo-L-tryptophan into 5-bromoindole, pyruvic acid and ammonia. 5-bromoindole can then go on to react with a different FAD-dependent halogenase called AetA to form 2,3,5-tribromoindole. the 2,3,5-tribromoindole and the dibrominated-indole-3-carbonitrile then undergo biaryl coupling facilitated by the cytochrome P450 class enzyme AetB to form AETX.

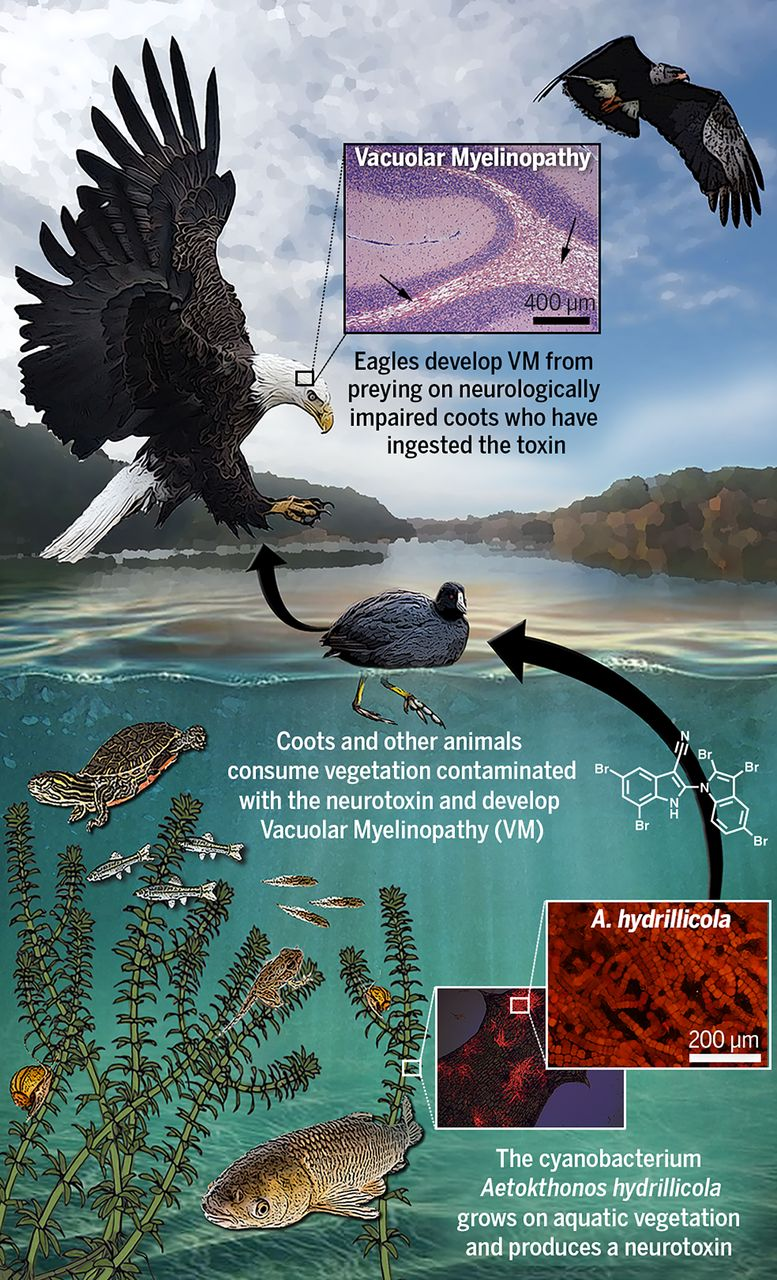
Toxin transmission from cyanobacteria to the bald eagle

== Mechanism of action ==
AETX is thought to collapse the proton gradient across the inner mitochondrial membrane in a manner analogous to niclosamide, bromethalin, and tralopyril (the active metabolite of chlorfenapyr).

== See also ==
- Cyanotoxin
- Harmful algal bloom
- Persistent organic pollutant
