= Rosboro, Arkansas =

Unincorporated community in Arkansas, US

Coordinates: 34°17′15″N 93°30′31″W

Rosboro (formerly Rosborough) is an unincorporated community in Clark Township, Pike County, Arkansas, United States.

The community is located in northeast Pike County on Arkansas Highway 8. Amity in adjacent Clark County is three miles to the southeast and Glenwood is three miles to the northwest at the intersection of Highway 8 with US Route 70. The Caddo River flows past about one mile to the northeast.

== Education ==
It lies within the Centerpoint School District. It was in the Glenwood School District, which consolidated with the Amity School District to form the Centerpoint School District effective July 1, 1995.
