= Centerpoint School District =

Public school district Arkansas, USA

Location
- 755 Highway 8 East; Amity, Arkansas 71921 United States

District information
- Grades: PK–12
- Established: 1995
- Superintendent: Jody Cowart
- Accreditation: Arkansas Department of Education
- Schools: Centerpoint High School; Centerpoint Elementary School
- NCES District ID: 0506690

Students and staff
- Students: 1,047
- Teachers: 81.24 (on FTE basis)
- Staff: 167.24 (on FTE basis)
- Student–teacher ratio: 12.89
- District mascot: Knight
- Colors: Purple; Gold; Gray

Other information
- Website: www.goknights.us

The Centerpoint School District is based in Rosboro, Arkansas, United States. The school district encompasses 209.66 square miles (543.0 km^{2}) of land including portions of Pike, Hot Spring, Garland, and Clark counties. Within Pike County, it serves almost all of Glenwood, and within Clark County it serves Amity and Alpine.

Jody Cowart began his tenure as superintendent July 1, 2022, replacing Dan Breshears. Former superintendents also include Dr. Anne Butcher, Lewis Diggs, and Curtis Turner, Jr.

== History ==
The Amity School District merged with the Glenwood School District to form the Centerpoint district on July 1, 1995. Curtis Turner, Jr. served as the district's first superintendent.

Initially upon consolidation, Glenwood and Amity kept active campuses with each school serving its own students in grades kindergarten through sixth. Under the direction of superintendent Lewis Diggs, those campuses were later reconfigured. Centerpoint High School opened in 1997.

Glenwood Elementary School converted to a pre-K through third grade primary school campus serving all Centerpoint students in those grade levels regardless of their address. David Combs served as principal. Amity Elementary School was converted to a fourth through fifth grade intermediate school campus with former Bismarck School District superintendent Rodney Whitfield serving as principal.

Also at the time of this reconfiguration, the high school building was expanded to include sixth grade students.

== District boundaries ==
Within Pike County, the district includes the majority of Glenwood. Within Clark County, the district includes Amity and Alpine. The district extends into Garland County and Hot Springs County.

It also serves the unincorporated areas of Bonnerdale in Hot Spring County and Rosboro in Pike County.

== Schools ==
=== Current Schools ===
Centerpoint High School
The school is located in Rosboro and serves more than 550 students in grades 6 through 12.

Teddy Qualls is the current principal having assumed duties July 1, 2022. John Bright serves as dean of students.

Centerpoint Elementary School
Located in Rosboro, the school serves approximately 500 students in grades pre-K through fifth grade.

Erica Doster is the current principal having assumed duties July 1, 2021. Jennifer Hill serves as assistant principal.

=== Former Schools ===
Centerpoint Primary School served students in grades pre-K through third grade until 2017 when construction was completed on the new Centerpoint Elementary School located adjacent to the high school in Rosboro. Rodney Whitfield was the last person to hold the office of principal.

Centerpoint Intermediate School served students in grades fourth and fifth until Centerpoint Elementary opened in 2017. Penny Smothers was the last principal at CIS. She became the first principal of the new Centerpoint Elementary School with Whitfield serving as assistant principal.

Centerpoint Middle School was a separate entity from Centerpoint High School from 2019 to 2021. The two schools merged again effective July 1, 2021.

== Board of education ==
The district is governed by a seven-member board of directors. Current members include:

- Randy Bradford
- Blake Forga
- Larry Harvey
- Kerry Horn
- Mauricio Servellon
- Dale Sutton
- Lisa Wright
