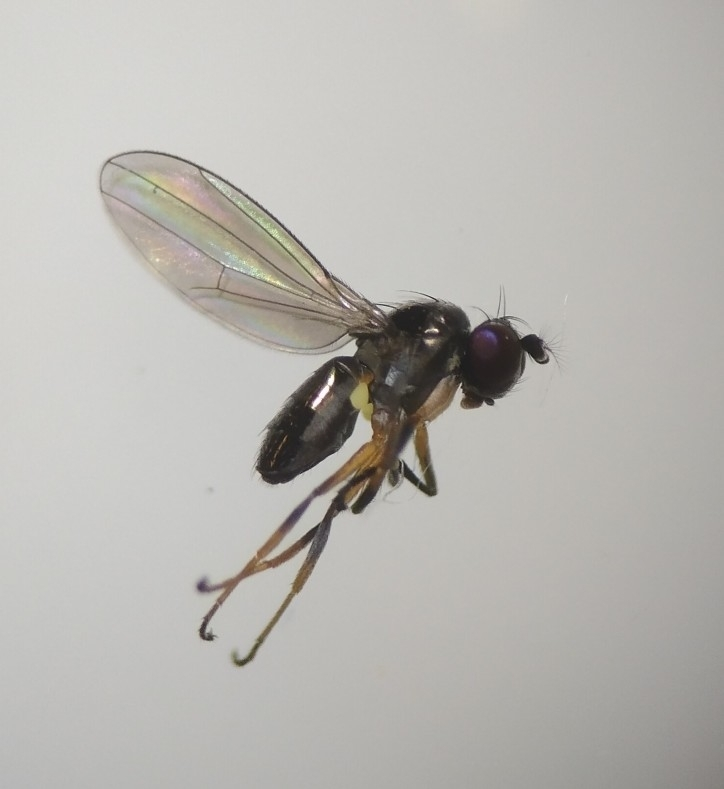
- Hydrellia tritici from the side

Scientific classification
- Kingdom: Animalia
- Phylum: Arthropoda
- Clade: Pancrustacea
- Class: Insecta
- Order: Diptera
- Family: Ephydridae
- Genus: Hydrellia
- Species: H. tritici

Binomial name
- Hydrellia tritici Coquillett, 1903

= Hydrellia tritici =

Pasture fly species

Hydrellia tritici, the black pasture fly or shore fly, is an insect native to Australia.

== Range ==
=== Global range ===
While Hydrellia tritici is predominantly found in southeastern Australia and New Zealand, some individuals have been found in northeastern Australia, the United States, and France. Hydrellia tritici has been introduced in Hawaii.

=== New Zealand range ===
Hydrellia tritici is found throughout both mainland islands of New Zealand.
