= Hydrellia philippina =

Scientific classification
- Kingdom: Animalia
- Phylum: Arthropoda
- Class: Insecta
- Order: Diptera
- Family: Ephydridae
- Subfamily: Hydrelliinae
- Tribe: Hydrelliini
- Genus: Hydrellia
- Species: H. philippina

Binomial name
- Hydrellia philippina Ferino, 1968

Species of fly

Hydrellia philippina is a fly species in the family Ephydridae. It is a pest of millets.

== Distribution ==
China, India, Philippines, Taiwan, Thailand, Vietnam.
