= Centerpoint High School =

Location
- 755 Hwy. 8 East; Amity, Arkansas 71921; United States; 34°17′14″N 93°30′41″W

Information
- School type: Public
- Motto: Every Knight. Every Day.
- Founded: 1997 (29 years ago)
- School district: Centerpoint School District
- Principal: Teddy Qualls
- Faculty: 52
- Teaching staff: 60.95 (FTE)
- Grades: 6–12
- Enrollment: 523 (2023-2024)
- Student to teacher ratio: 8.58
- Hours in school day: 7:45–4:14
- Colors: Purple; Gold; Gray
- Fight song: “On, Wisconsin!”
- Athletics conference: 3A-4 (Football); 3A-7 (Other sports)
- Sports: Football, soccer, basketball, baseball, track, cross country, softball, cheer
- Mascot: Knight
- Team name: Centerpoint Knights
- Accreditation: Arkansas Department of Education
- Yearbook: Excalibur
- Communities served: Amity, Glenwood
- Feeder schools: Centerpoint Elementary School
- Website: www.goknights.us/page/high-school-page

Centerpoint High School is an accredited public high school serving students in grades six through twelve in the rural community of Rosboro, Arkansas, United States.

== History ==
In 1995, the Glenwood School District in Glenwood, Arkansas, voluntarily consolidated with the nearby Amity School District in Amity, Arkansas. Construction began shortly thereafter on a new high school located at Rosboro. The new Centerpoint High School opened in August 1997.

== Academics ==
Centerpoint High School is accredited by the Arkansas Department of Education (ADE). Students are required to complete at least 24 credits in order to graduate.

== Co-curricular activities ==
The Knights sports teams include football, golf (boys/girls), basketball (boys/girls), baseball, softball, cross country (boys/girls), soccer (boys/girls), cheer, and track and field (boys/girls).

Quiz Bowl
The senior high quiz bowl team has won five state championships.

EAST
The EAST chapter was the recipient of the 2009 Founder's Award, which is given annually to the EAST chapter that best exemplifies the vision of founder Tim Stephenson.
