= KHGZ =

Radio station in Glenwood, Arkansas

Coordinates: 34°19′32″N 93°33′27″W

- Glenwood, Arkansas; United States
- Frequency: 670 kHz
- Branding: Radio La Ley 98.9 FM.

Programming
- Format: Regional Mexican
- Affiliations: Unknown

Ownership
- Owner: Radio La Raza, LLC

History
- First air date: 1980 (as KWXI)
- Former call signs: KQAC (1979–1980, CP); KWXI (1980–2013)

Technical information
- Licensing authority: FCC
- Facility ID: 8148
- Class: D
- Power: 5,000 watts day
- Translator: 98.9 K255BH (Glenwood)

Links
- Public license information: Public file; LMS

KHGZ (670 AM) is a radio station licensed to Glenwood, Arkansas. The station broadcasts a Regional Mexican format, and is owned by Radio La Raza, LLC. KHGZ is also heard on 98.9 FM—including after sunset—through a translator in Glenwood, Arkansas. While the format was previously on Fox Sports, the transmitter had issues, like audio cutting in and out, sometimes going off air for a long time, and after the format switch, the issues were gone.

Somewhat in 2024, they flipped to Fox Sports Radio, And then in June 2026, they flipped to Regional Mexican music (Radio La Ley). As of now, it is still in that format.

Call sign	Frequency	City of license	FID	ERP (W)	HAAT	Class	FCC info
K255BH	98.9 FM	Glenwood, Arkansas	150880	250	102.1 m (335 ft)	D	LMS
K300DJ	107.9 FM	Hot Springs, Arkansas	201326	250	44 m (144 ft)	D	LMS
