= Amity, Arkansas =

- City
- Flag

- Location of Amity in Clark County, Arkansas.
- Coordinates: 34°15′58″N 93°27′51″W
- Country: United States
- State: Arkansas
- County: Clark

Government
  - Mayor: John McAnnally

Area
  - Total: 3.21 sq mi (8.31 km^{2})
  - Land: 3.21 sq mi (8.31 km^{2})
  - Water: 0 sq mi (0.00 km^{2})
- Elevation: 512 ft (156 m)

Population (2020)
  - Total: 681
  - Estimate (2025): 674 ▼
  - Density: 212.2/sq mi (81.92/km^{2})
- Time zone: Central
  - Summer (DST): Central
- ZIP codes: 71921
- Area code: 870
- FIPS code: 05-01360
- GNIS feature ID: 2403094
- Website: amityarkansas.us

Amity is a city in Clark County, Arkansas, United States. The population was 681 at the 2020 census. The city began on the Caddo River in the mid-19th century when William F. Browning and others, including A.B. Clingman, at various times moved to the area.

== History ==
Amity was founded in 1847 by several pioneer families from the Mount Bethel area of Clark County under the leadership of William F. Browning, who served as the Clark County surveyor from 1846 until his death in 1854. The group settled along the Caddo River, drawn to the area by an abundance of rich bottomland and fresh water. Browning constructed a two-story log house just west of Caney Creek, which soon became the center of the expanding community. It was Browning who gave Amity its name.

Together with other citizens, Browning formed the Caddo Valley Baptist Church of Christ, which before several other names would later develop into the Bethel Missionary Baptist Church in Glenwood and First Baptist Church in Amity. It is thought to be the first religious organization in the area, though A.B. Clingman, a physician and minister associated with the Church of Christ was in the area before Browning's group arrived. Browning's group built a large log house that would serve as both the church and the school house. The first school teacher was Captain Robert S. Burke, a former military officer and Browning's brother-in-law. A few months later, the first Amity Post Office was established nearby.

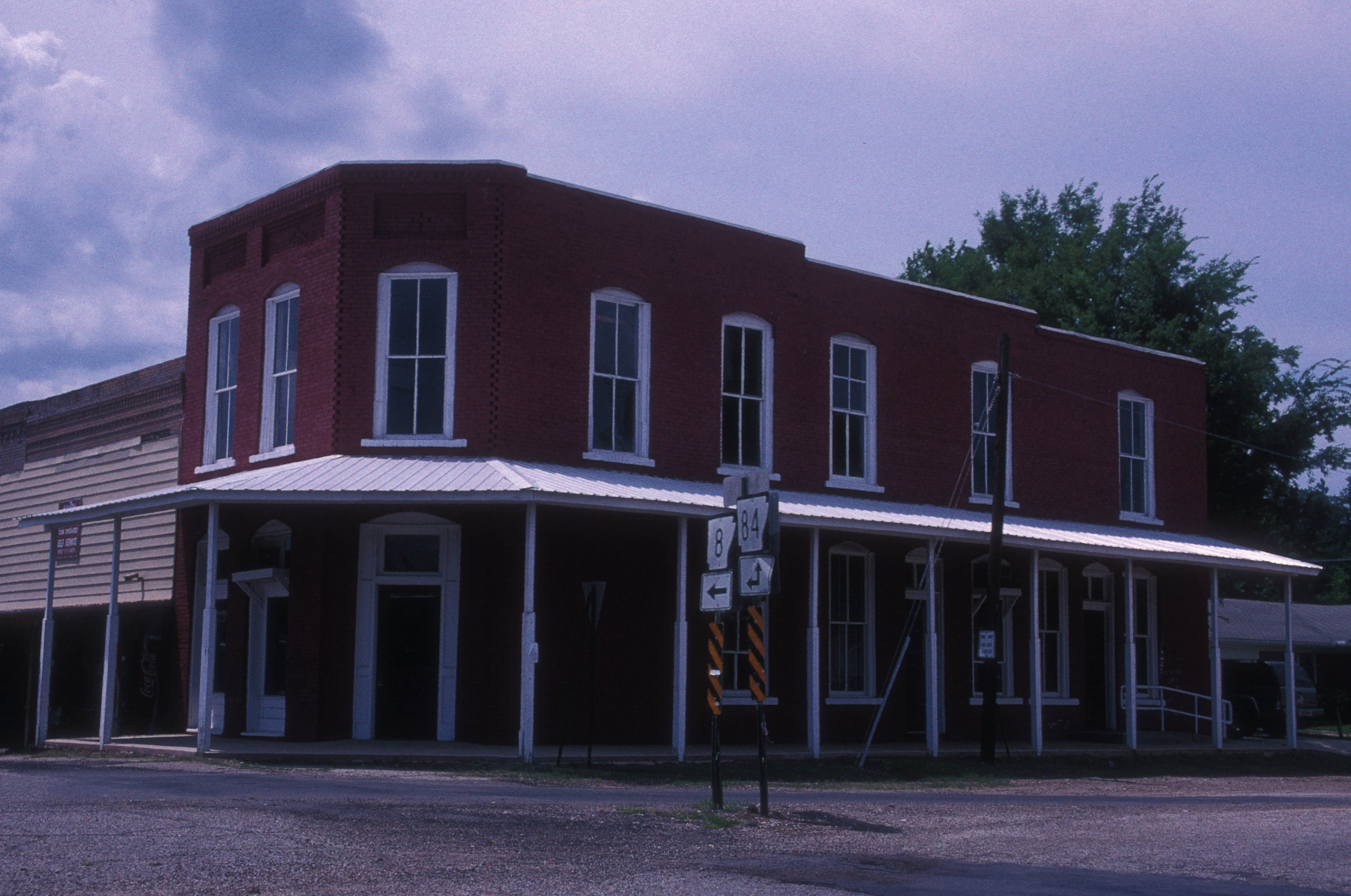
The Old Bank of Amity on the main square is listed on the National Register of Historic Places.

With the outbreak of the Civil War, the community saw dark times. Initially in support of the Confederacy, soon the community became divided, with the men of Amity leaving to fight in both the Confederate Army and the Union Army. In several cases, families were split by their loyalties, causing turmoil within the small community. Midway through the war, Union soldiers burned the Burke schoolhouse and the Browning cotton press.

Following the war's end, the center of the community shifted to a location 2 miles (3 km) south of the Caddo River, first settled by John Hays Allen and Amariah Biggs. Biggs was widely known as a physician and Methodist minister, and first settled in the area around 1850. The Amity Post Office was soon after relocated to this area. In 1870, retired army Colonel Philander Curtis, a Connecticut native, settled in the area. Curtis built the first house where the town of Amity now stands, and served for several years as the town's postmaster. In 1871, Col. Curtis and businessmen Riley Thompson and Jacob H. Lightsey purchased property from John Hays Allen, and on that property they laid out plans for the town, centering on a public square. By 1874 Amity had become a thriving village, with several new businesses and churches. In 1877 an adjacent area became "Amity Township", and in 1880 the town made a move to become incorporated, but it did not come to pass until 1907.

In the late 1870s a new schoolhouse was built. Its first teacher was Richard Melancthon Burke, son of Captain Robert Burke. The residents also formed the Amity Male and Female Academy, which eventually became Amity High School. Richard Burke died in 1883, and the school struggled until 1888, when Samual M. Samson arrived in Amity. Samson spent the next twenty years as the head of the high school, which at that time was a private school. After his departure, it was absorbed into the Amity Public School System.

In 1887, a false rumor that gold had been discovered in an area then known as the Trap Mountains resulted in a brief gold rush, which ended when the rumor proved false. Shortly after 1900, the Gurdon and Fort Smith Railroad was constructed through Amity, greatly improving the economy of the town. Soon, the logging industry began to thrive, with large sawmills opening in Rosboro and Glenwood. Amity became a main shipping and trade center for the area, and in 1905 the Bank of Amity opened, which now is on the National Register of Historic Places. In 1899 the town's first newspaper, the Amity Enterprise, went into circulation, followed by the Four-County Courier in 1915 and the Amity Owl in 1922. Just before World War II, the shortage of cinnabar caused a brief but productive mining industry in the nearby mountains south of the town, a phenomenon which became known as the Quicksilver Rush. However, any significant mining had ended by 1940, and following the war and an increased worldwide supply, the mines closed.

=== Recent history ===
With the Bean Lumber Company opening in 1940, followed by the Barksdale Lumber Company, logging soon became the main source of employment for the town. At its peak, the Bean Lumber Company was producing more than 150 million board feet of pine lumber and 120 million board feet of treated lumber annually, making it one of the largest distributors of southern pine in the United States. The Bean Lumber Company would later open mills in Glenwood and in Buckner, Missouri.

A.J. Hunter, who had originally come to town in 1905 to manage the city's first telephone exchange and who would later, upon the closure of the city's newspaper, begin The Owl, sold the paper in the 1940s to Marvin C. Bass of Little Rock. The paper then operated until the mid-1950s and closed, though no one remembers when or why it closed.

By 2007 Bean Lumber was struggling financially and was under investigation for financial matters. The Amity mill closed, though the planer and treatment plants remained open. The Glenwood mill, which employed many Amity residents, closed and did not reopen until 2008. All of these events thoroughly affected the local economy, diminishing employment opportunities in the community, as well as briefly diminishing the population of the town, with many people being forced to search for work elsewhere.

In 1995, Amity School District merged with Glenwood School District to create Centerpoint High School, located midway between the two towns, in Rosboro, Pike County. The private Ouachita Hills Academy and Ouachita Hills College, associated with the Seventh-day Adventist Church, are located southwest of Amity on the Clark-Pike county line. Word of Faith Christian Academy is located east of town between Amity and Alpine.

In 1996, Arkadelphia native Joe May founded the city's fourth newspaper, The Standard. The paper is a weekly publication and covers Clark and Pike counties as well as the Bismarck, Arkansas, area. In addition to publishing the newspaper, May Publishing Company puts out the Trade Days Gazette, a free-circulation paper at the monthly Amity Trade Days event. They also publish the Old Time Chronicle, a quarterly folk history magazine covering South Arkansas.

In 2007, the city observed its 100th anniversary of incorporation with a two-day festival on the square. In 2008, the city's businesspeople formed the Amity Area Chamber of Commerce.

In 2015, Russell and Kim Jones of Rosboro started Amity Trade Days in the former Bean Lumber Company's sawmill facility. Trade Days is a monthly flea market modeled after those in Canton, Texas. It attracts more than 6,000 people per month and has nearly 200 venders. It is held the first weekend (Thursday-Sunday) after the first Monday of each month.

== Geography ==
Amity is located in northwestern Clark County 2 miles (3 km) south of the Caddo River. It is bordered on its west side by Pike County. Arkansas Highway 8 passes through the center of the city, leading northwest 7 miles (11 km) to Glenwood and southeast 27 miles (43 km) to Arkadelphia, the Clark County seat.

According to the United States Census Bureau, Amity has a total area of 3.3 square miles (8.5 km^{2}), all land.

== Demographics ==
Historical population
Census	Pop.	Note	%±
1880	140		—
1890	211		50.7%
1910	813		—
1920	680		−16.4%
1930	608		−10.6%
1940	608		0.0%
1950	591		−2.8%
1960	543		−8.1%
1970	614		13.1%
1980	859		39.9%
1990	526		−38.8%
2000	762		44.9%
2010	723		−5.1%
2020	681		−5.8%
2025 (est.)	674	▼	−1.0%
U.S. Decennial Census

As of the census of 2000, there were 762 people, 305 households, and 208 families residing in the city. The population density was 231.9 inhabitants per square mile (89.5/km^{2}). There were 361 housing units at an average density of 109.9 per square mile (42.4/km^{2}). The racial makeup of the city was 96.85% White, 0.92% Black or African American, 0.79% Native American, 0.92% from other races, and 0.52% from two or more races. 2.49% of the population were Hispanic or Latino of any race.

There were 305 households, out of which 34.4% had children under the age of 18 living with them, 56.1% were married couples living together, 9.5% had a female householder with no husband present, and 31.5% were non-families. 27.5% of all households were made up of individuals, and 13.8% had someone living alone who was 65 years of age or older. The average household size was 2.50 and the average family size was 3.07.

In the city, the population was spread out, with 27.3% under the age of 18, 9.6% from 18 to 24, 26.9% from 25 to 44, 21.4% from 45 to 64, and 14.8% who were 65 years of age or older. The median age was 33 years. For every 100 females, there were 96.4 males. For every 100 females age 18 and over, there were 89.7 males.

The median income for a household in the city was $25,625, and the median income for a family was $32,188. Males had a median income of $22,330 versus $16,250 for females. The per capita income for the city was $13,626. About 10.0% of families and 14.9% of the population were below the poverty line, including 17.8% of those under age 18 and 17.9% of those age 65 or over.

== Education ==
Amity students attend school in the Centerpoint School District. The three schools in the district are Centerpoint Elementary School, which serves students in grades pre-K through fifth, Centerpoint High School, which serves students in grades sixth through twelfth, and Ouachita Hills Academy, which is a Christian Boarding Academy that serves students in grades nine through twelve.

The Amity School District merged with the Glenwood School District to form the Centerpoint School District July 1, 1995.

== Notable people ==
- Billy Bob Thornton, Noted actor and director
- Bertha Frank Teague Noted high school basketball coach
