= Hydrellia personata =

Scientific classification
- Kingdom: Animalia
- Phylum: Arthropoda
- Clade: Pancrustacea
- Class: Insecta
- Order: Diptera
- Family: Ephydridae
- Subfamily: Hydrelliinae
- Tribe: Hydrelliini
- Genus: Hydrellia
- Species: H. personata

Binomial name
- Hydrellia personata Deonier, 1971

Species of fly

Hydrellia personata is a species of shore flies in the family Ephydridae.

== Distribution ==
United States.
