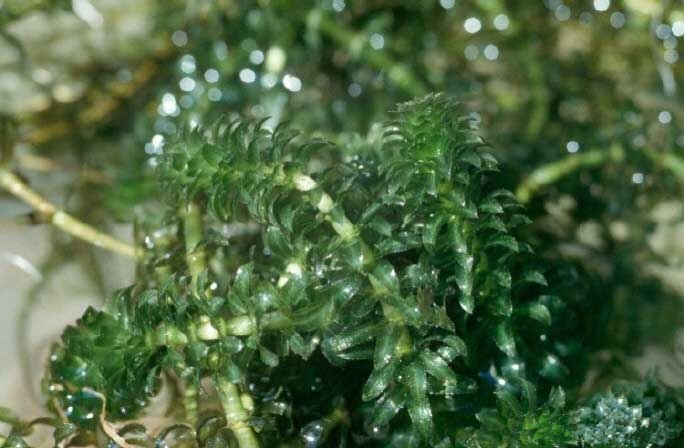

Conservation status
- Least Concern (IUCN 3.1)

Scientific classification
- Kingdom: Plantae
- Clade: Tracheophytes
- Clade: Angiosperms
- Clade: Monocots
- Order: Alismatales
- Family: Hydrocharitaceae
- Genus: Hydrilla; Rich.
- Species: H. verticillata

Binomial name
- Hydrilla verticillata (L.f.) Royle

= Hydrilla =

Species of plant

Hydrilla (waterthyme) is a genus of aquatic plants, usually treated as containing just one species — Hydrilla verticillata, but some botanists divide it into several species. It is native to the cool and warm waters of the Old World in Asia, Africa, and Australia, with a sparse, scattered distribution; in Australia it occurs from the Northern Territory to Queensland and New South Wales.

The stems grow up to 2 m long. The leaves are arranged in whorls of two to eight around the stem, each leaf 5–20 mm long and 0.7–2 mm broad, with serrations or small spines along the leaf margins; the leaf midrib is often reddish when fresh. It is monoecious (sometimes dioecious), with male and female flowers produced separately on a single plant; the flowers are small, with three sepals and three petals, the petals 3–5 mm long, transparent with red streaks. It reproduces primarily vegetatively by fragmentation and by rhizomes and turions (overwintering), and flowers are rarely seen. They have air spaces to keep them upright.

Hydrilla has a high resistance to salinity compared to many other freshwater aquatic plants. It can grow up to an inch a day, producing dense mats of vegetation along the bottom of lakes and rivers. As it grows up to the water's surface, these mats can become several feet thick. In the United States, Hydrilla is widely recognized as a serious invasive species that is exceptionally difficult to manage once established.

== Taxonomy and naming ==
Hydrilla closely resembles some other related aquatic plants, including Egeria densa and Elodea canadensis. Synonyms include H. asiatica, H. japonica, H. lithuanica, and H. ovalifolica.

== Ecology ==
Hydrilla verticillata is negative allelopathic to the common hornwort (Ceratophyllum demersum) and prickly hornwort (C. muricatum), that is, it produces compounds that inhibit growth of the latter two species.

As aquatic macrophytes, Hydrilla play critical roles in the ecosystem. They influence nutrient cycles and the ecology of the body of water, as well as the sediments. Hydrilla interacts with other organisms, supplying food and nutrients as well as habitats and shelters.

Hydrilla can have negative impacts in aquatic communities. When abundant, they affect dissolved oxygen levels, which can lead to decline in populations of fish, invertebrates, and other plant species.

== Status as an invasive plant ==
=== Introduction ===
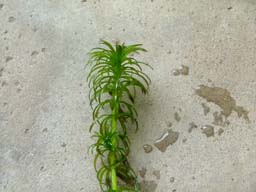
Foliage detail

Hydrilla is naturalized and invasive in the United States following release in the 1950s and 1960s from aquariums into waterways in Florida, due to the aquarium trade. It is now established in parts of southern Canada and in the United States from Connecticut to Texas, and also in California. By the 1990s control and management were costing millions of dollars each year.

The plant was introduced when a Florida West Coast aquarium dealer shipped live Hydrilla from Sri Lanka under the common name "Indian star-vine." These plants were considered unsatisfactory and were dumped into a canal near Tampa Bay, where they flourished. By 1955, the plants found their way from Tampa to Miami as they were transported for cultivation and pet trade sale. It is believed that several undocumented cases of accidental or careless releases followed, as there was extensive spread of the Hydrilla throughout Florida and the southeastern United States.

=== Importance of accurate identification ===
Accurate identification of Hydrilla verticillata is essential for regulatory reporting, ecological monitoring, and management planning. Misidentification may lead to unnecessary treatment of native vegetation or delayed response to invasive spread.

Hydrilla is frequently confused with Elodea canadensis and Egeria densa due to similar submerged growth form.

=== Problems ===
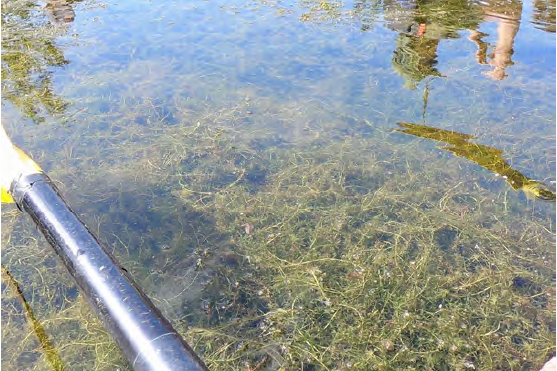
A thick bed of Hydrilla in the Mallows Bay–Potomac River National Marine Sanctuary in Charles County. Maryland.

Due to the combination of herbicide resistance, high growth rates, high ecological adaptability, dispersion ability, and low resources required, Hydrilla is able to invade almost every region of the world and spread at an alarming rate, affecting the ecosystem in a negative manner. The high photosynthesis rate of Hydrilla leads to the depletion in dissolved carbon dioxide during daytime, which raises the pH, and to higher concentrations of oxygen. At night, the oxygen is used for oxidative phosphorylation, resulting in anoxia, and carbon dioxide is replenished, which in turn lowers the pH.

As an invasive species in Florida, Hydrilla has become the most serious aquatic weed problem for Florida and most of the U.S. Because it was such a threat as an invasive species, one of the first cost-effective broadscale herbicide controls developed was fluridone. Unfortunately, this single-use herbicide resulted in fluridone-resistant Hydrilla. "As Hydrilla spread rapidly to lakes across the southern United States in the past, the expansion of resistant biotypes is likely to pose significant environmental challenges in the future."

Hydrilla populations have caused economic, environmental, and ecological damage. Hydrilla is known to be an aggressive and competitive plant, out-competing and displacing native species, such as pondweeds and eelgrass. Hydrilla has thus created monocultures, areas dominated by a single species, rather than having a balance among many species, as in a normal ecosystem.

In Australia, Hydrilla can become invasive if the nutrient levels are raised in disturbed ecosystems, though is not generally known to be problematic.

Hydrilla can host a biofilm of the cyanobacteria Aetokthonos hydrillicola, which can produce the brominated neurotoxin aetokthonotoxin — the causative agent of avian vacuolar myelinopathy, a fatal brain wasting disease of waterfowl and raptors.

=== Management ===
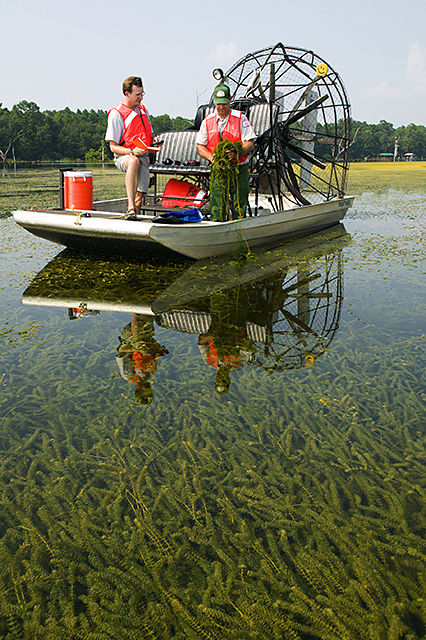
Hydrilla verticillata collection at Lake Seminole, Florida

Hydrilla can be controlled by herbicides, as well as grass carp, itself an invasive species in North America. Insects used as biological pest control for this plant include weevils of the genus Bagous and the Asian hydrilla leaf-mining fly (Hydrellia pakistanae). Tubers pose a problem as they can lie dormant for a number of years, making it even more difficult to remove from waterways and estuaries. Hydrilla can spread efficiently through both tubers and turions.

In 2011 an inlet of Cayuga Lake, one of the Finger Lakes in New York State, faced a Hydrilla introduction. The city of Ithaca and other local officials used the chemical herbicide endothall to try to head off establishment in the Finger Lakes, which would have been disastrous for their ecosystems. The first year nearly $100,000 and many man-hours were spent trying to eradicate the Hydrilla infestation. Follow-up treatments were planned for at least five years.

In August 2021 Hydrilla was discovered growing in a small boat marina connected to the Niagara River in the city of North Tonawanda, New York. The New York State Department of Environmental Conservation is working to contain the infestation.

In September 2021, the Connecticut River Conservancy stated that Hydrilla has been overwhelming tributary rivers, coves, inlets and riverbanks along the river for years. Kelsey Wentling, a river steward at the Connecticut River Conservancy, stated, "Hydrilla can spread through a process known as fragmentation, in which the plants, due to some sort of disruption, break apart and regrow elsewhere. Fragmentation often happens when boats go through a patch of Hydrilla. For this reason, it is critical that those using paddle boats, power boats, jet skis, and fishing equipment in the Connecticut River be aware of invasive Hydrilla and then take steps to reduce its spread." It has also been reported by local marinas and municipalities that they can no longer access certain boat slips and docks due to the density of Hydrilla. The Connecticut River Conservancy in September 2021 requested area boaters to complete a survey to help with the ongoing management of the invasive plant.

In North Carolina, it is challenging to manage Hydrilla because of the presence of the local type (monoecious), which has a unique seasonal growth cycle and produces subterranean tubers to help it survive through the winter. While novel systemic herbicides like florpyrauxifen-benzyl have been shown to be rapidly taken up by plants in experimental conditions, the strong water flow quickly washes the herbicide away in high-flow lakes such as Roanoke Rapids Lake before it can stay on the plant long enough to be effective. This, however, can be circumvented with intermittent herbicide application to counteract rapid dilution.

== Phytoremediation ==
This abundant source of biomass is a known bioremediation hyperaccumulator of mercury, cadmium, chromium and lead, and as such can be used in phytoremediation.
