= Amity School District =

School district in Oregon, USA

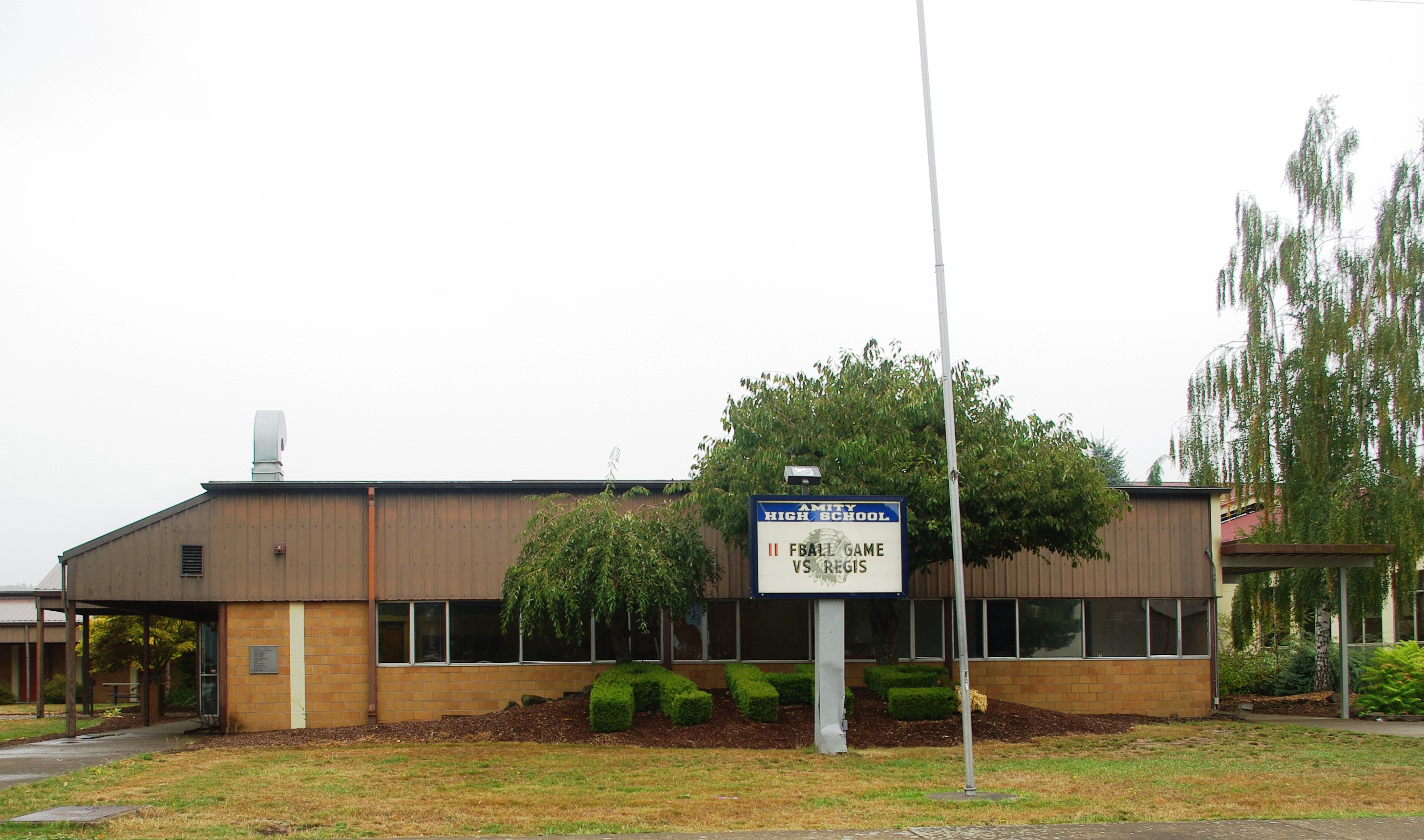

Address
- 807 Trade Street Amity, Oregon, 97101; United States
- Coordinates: 45°6′46″N 123°12′24″W

District information
- Type: Public
- Grades: KG-12
- Superintendent: Jeff Clark
- Chair of the board: Matt Foertsch
- Schools: 3
- NCES District ID: 4101230

Students and staff
- Students: 836
- Teachers: 50
- Student–teacher ratio: 18:1

Other information
- Website: amity.k12.or.us

Amity School District 4J is a rural public school district located in Yamhill County, Oregon. The district contains 3 schools and serves the residents of Amity and the surrounding areas.

== Demographics ==
=== Students ===
District student enrollment by race is

- 1% American Indian/Alaska Native
- 1% Asian
- <1% Black/African American
- 13% Hispanic/Latino
- 5% declared Multiracial
- <1% Native Hawaiian/Pacific Islander
- 80% White

=== Teachers ===
District staff employment by race is

- 2% Asian
- 3% declared Multiracial
- 2% Native Hawaiian/Pacific Islander
- 93% White

== Schools ==
The district contains an elementary school, a middle school, and a high school, all located in Amity. A K-12 school, Eola Hills Charter School, officially closed in 2023.

=== Elementary schools ===
- Amity Elementary School

=== Middle schools ===
- Amity Middle School

=== High schools ===
- Amity High School
