= Ouachita Hills College =

Seventh-Day Adventist college in Amity, Arkansas, US

- Motto: "In the Highest Sense, the Work of Education and the Work of Redemption are One."
- Type: Private College
- Established: 2000
- Religious affiliation: Seventh-day Adventist Church
- President: Dr. Chester Clark
- Location: Amity, Arkansas, United States; 34°13′46″N 93°30′19″W
- Campus: Rural, 900 acres (3.6 km^{2})
- Colors: Navy and Gold
- Website: www.ohc.org

Ouachita Hills College is a self-supporting Seventh-day Adventist educational organization. It originated from Ouachita Hills Academy, a high school on the same campus. It is located in Amity, Arkansas in the United States and was established in 2000.

The college offers bachelor's degrees in Business, Music, Theology, Christian Elementary Education, Christian Secondary Education, Biblical Studies, and Personal Evangelism. Students enrolled in the college program spend part of each day in practical work programs. The program was founded to incorporate apprentice-style learning into the studies. Many of the students in the program can pay their way through school by taking part in the distribution of Christian and Health literature, sometimes referred to as literature evangelism or canvassing.

== History ==
In the mid-19th century the Seventh-day Adventist denomination began developing a system of higher education. One of the early schools, Madison College of Tennessee, pioneered a philosophy of education that emphasized a holistic preparation for life. Students at Madison learned a trade. Their teachers joined them for several hours each day in practical work outside the class room.

Counsels from Ellen G. White gave significant guidance to the Madison School, in which Ouachita Hills College is modeled after the philosophy of the Madison School.

=== 2000-2001: Establishment ===
In 2000 the Board of Directors of Ouachita Ministries, Inc. voted to form a college; in 2001 the state of Arkansas granted Ouachita Hills College its religious-exempt status.

=== 2003–present: Ouachita Hills College ===
In the fall of 2003 the college first opened classes with 31 students. Many came from the Center for Evangelistic Canvassing (CEC) in Harrah, Oklahoma, Southwestern Adventist University in Keene, Texas, and from Andrews University in Berrien Springs, Michigan. The founder and primary instructor of CEC, Eugene Prewitt, joined Harriet Clark and her son Chester Clark III as administrators of the newly formed Ouachita Hills College. The College shares a campus with an affiliated high school. Both schools are classed as "self supporting" meaning they are not owned and operated by the organized Seventh-day Adventist Church, but are supportive of the church.

== See also ==
- List of Seventh-day Adventist colleges and universities
- Seventh-day Adventist education
