= Glenwood, Arkansas =

- City
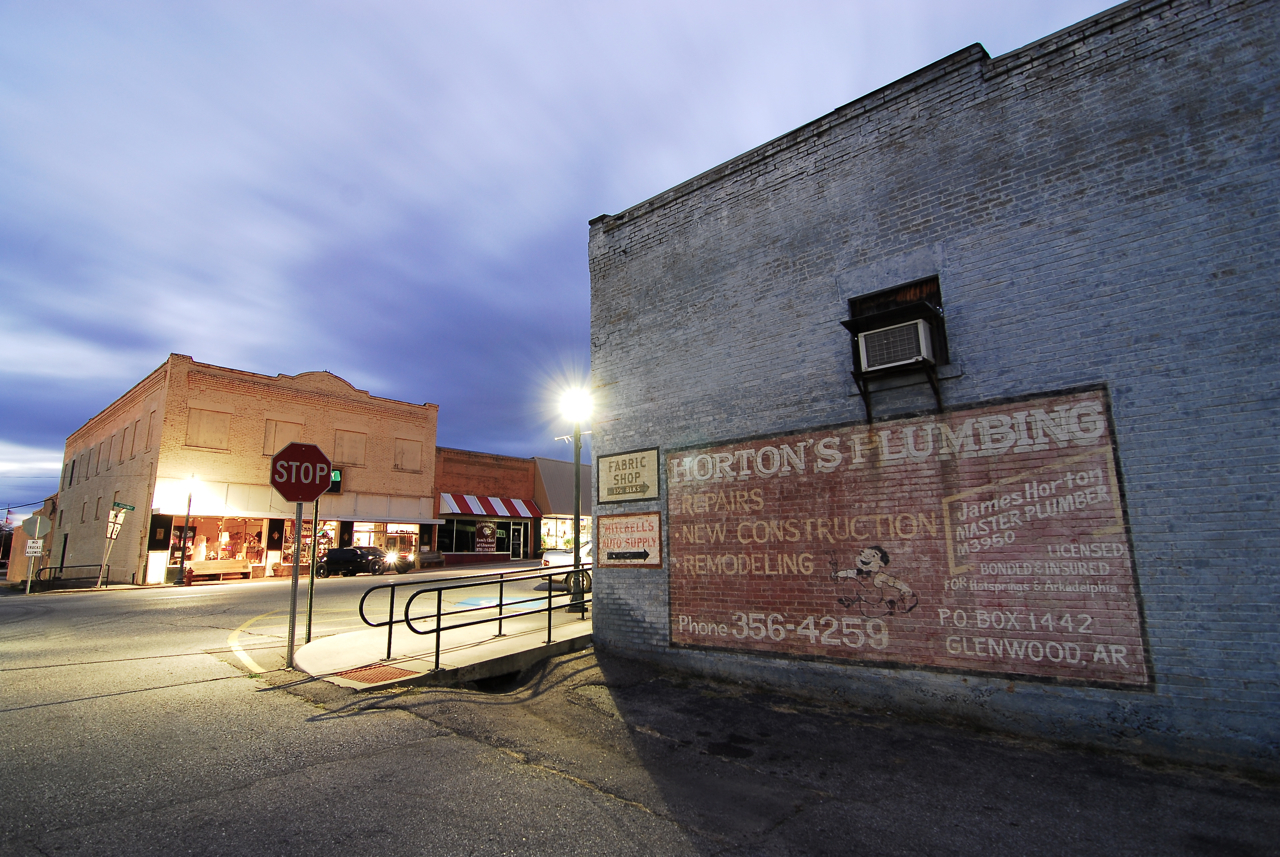
- Broadway Street at 2nd Street in Glenwood, November 2011

- Location in Montgomery County and Pike County, Arkansas
- Coordinates: 34°19′51″N 93°30′35″W
- Country: United States
- State: Arkansas
- Counties: Pike, Montgomery

Government
  - Mayor: Billy Plyler

Area
  - Total: 9.08 sq mi (23.52 km^{2})
  - Land: 8.91 sq mi (23.08 km^{2})
  - Water: 0.17 sq mi (0.44 km^{2})
- Elevation: 604 ft (184 m)

Population (2020)
  - Total: 2,068
  - Estimate (2025): 2,016 ▼
  - Density: 232.1/sq mi (89.62/km^{2})
- Time zone: Central
  - Summer (DST): Central
- ZIP Code: 71943
- Area code: 870
- FIPS code: 05-27310
- GNIS feature ID: 2403707

Glenwood is a city in Pike and Montgomery counties in Arkansas, United States. As of the 2020 census, its population was 2,068. The community is located along the Caddo River in the Ouachita Mountains.

Glenwood was formed as a boomtown following the development of the Gurdon and Fort Smith Railroad and timber interests in the area. After the establishment of a lumber mill, the community received a post office and incorporated in April 1909. Although the community saw its major employer leave during the Great Depression, the city has again seen rapid growth in recent decades. The city also sees significant tourism related to its scenic position in the Ouachitas and among several recreational lakes.

== Geography ==
Glenwood is located in the northeast corner of Pike County. Four small portions of the city extend north into Montgomery County. U.S. Route 70 passes through the city south of its center; it leads northeast 32 miles (51 km) to Hot Springs and southwest 56 miles (90 km) to De Queen. Arkansas Highway 8 passes through the city center, leading northwest 13 miles (21 km) to Norman and southeast 35 miles (56 km) to Arkadelphia.

According to the United States Census Bureau, the city has a total area of 9.08 square miles (23.52 km^{2}), of which 8.91 square miles (23.08 km^{2}) are land and 0.17 square miles (0.44 km^{2}), or 1.89%, are water. The Caddo River passes through the west side of the city, flowing southeast to join the Ouachita River north of Arkadelphia.

== Demographics ==
Historical population
Census	Pop.	Note	%±
1910	768		—
1920	891		16.0%
1930	1,310		47.0%
1940	854		−34.8%
1950	843		−1.3%
1960	840		−0.4%
1970	1,212		44.3%
1980	1,402		15.7%
1990	1,354		−3.4%
2000	1,751		29.3%
2010	2,228		27.2%
2020	2,068		−7.2%
2025 (est.)	2,016	▼	−2.5%
U.S. Decennial Census; 2014 Estimate

=== 2020 census ===
Glenwood racial composition
Race	Number	Percentage
White (non-Hispanic)	1,476	71.37%
Black or African American (non-Hispanic)	13	0.63%
Native American	18	0.87%
Asian	3	0.15%
Other/Mixed	72	3.48%
Hispanic or Latino	486	23.5%

As of the 2020 census, there were 2,068 people, 843 households, and 534 families residing in the city. The median age was 40.2 years. 25.4% of residents were under the age of 18 and 19.1% of residents were 65 years of age or older. For every 100 females there were 86.6 males, and for every 100 females age 18 and over there were 85.7 males age 18 and over.

0.0% of residents lived in urban areas, while 100.0% lived in rural areas.

Of the city's households, 36.7% had children under the age of 18 living in them. Of all households, 40.5% were married-couple households, 20.0% were households with a male householder and no spouse or partner present, and 34.0% were households with a female householder and no spouse or partner present. About 30.7% of all households were made up of individuals and 14.5% had someone living alone who was 65 years of age or older.

There were 967 housing units, of which 16.9% were vacant. The homeowner vacancy rate was 3.3% and the rental vacancy rate was 13.1%.

=== 2000 census ===
At the 2000 census, there were 1,751 people, 696 households and 446 families residing in the city. The population density was 630.5 inhabitants per square mile (243.4/km^{2}). There were 772 housing units at an average density of 278.0 per square mile (107.3/km^{2}). The racial makeup of the city was 88.18% White, 1.03% Black or African American, 1.03% Native American, 0.17% Asian, 8.79% from other races, and 0.80% from two or more races. 11.31% of the population were Hispanic or Latino of any race.

There were 696 households, of which 29.3% had children under the age of 18 living with them, 47.0% were married couples living together, 12.8% had a female householder with no husband present, and 35.9% were non-families. 32.3% of all households were made up of individuals, and 18.2% had someone living alone who was 65 years of age or older. The average household size was 2.37 and the average family size was 2.97.

23.3% of the population were under the age of 18, 10.0% from 18 to 24, 22.0% from 25 to 44, 20.0% from 45 to 64, and 24.7% who were 65 years of age or older. The median age was 41 years. For every 100 females, there were 85.5 males. For every 100 females age 18 and over, there were 81.7 males.

The median household income was $24,740 and the median family income was $32,829. Males had a median income of $26,528 compared with $16,354 for females. The per capita income for the city was $14,137. About 17.2% of families and 22.1% of the population were below the poverty line, including 28.3% of those under age 18 and 19.6% of those age 65 or over.

== Economy ==
The largest businesses/employers in Glenwood include John Plyler Home Center, Wright's Food Center, Shelby Manufacturing, Caddo River Forest Products, and the Centerpoint School District.

== Arts and culture ==
=== Annual cultural events ===
The Pike County Fairgrounds is the site for the Pike County Fair each September. The fair kicks off with a parade. Youngsters from around the county compete in beauty pageants, talent shows, and animal exhibits. The fair has a carnival and rodeo.

The annual Caddo River Festival is sponsored by the Glenwood Regional Chamber of Commerce the last weekend in April in the downtown area. The festival incorporates a parade, local talent, various vendors and food trucks, antique car and tractor shows, 5K race, and the premier attraction: canoe races (Canoes are on wheels and pushed up the main street).

=== Tourism ===
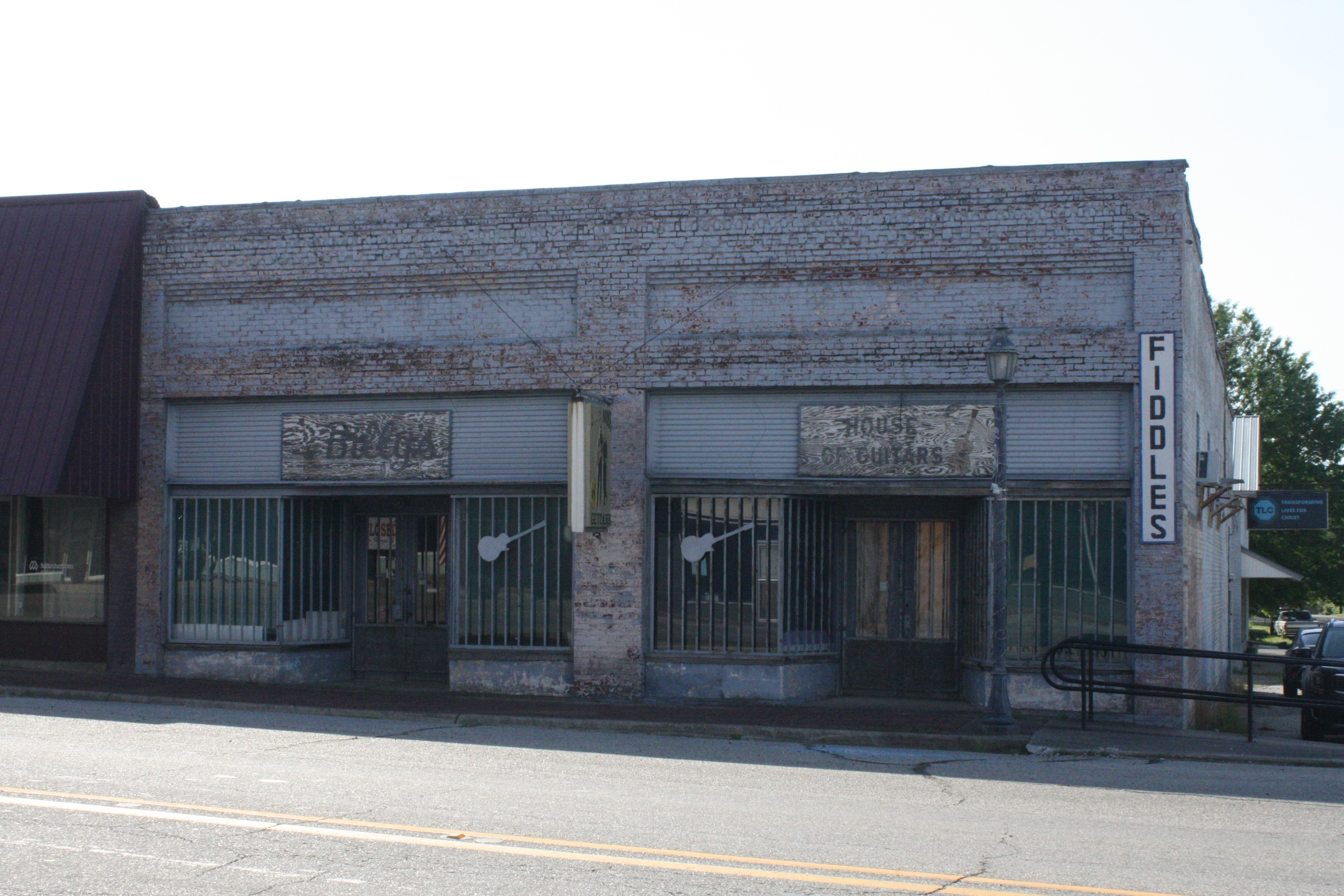
Billy's House of Guitars and Musical Museum at 201 E Broadway Street in Glenwood

Glenwood is the site of Billy's House of Guitars and Musical Museum, which includes instruments and memorabilia from notable guitarists such as Johnny Cash, Bob Dylan, George Harrison, Elvis Presley and Pete Seeger. The museum is located on Broadway Street (U.S. Route 70B) in downtown Glenwood. The Glenwood Country Club is located on US 70 east of town. An 18-hole public course with lodging and restaurant, the facility is listed on the Natural State Golf Trail, a collection of twelve elite courses in unique locations across the state.

The city also sees significant tourism associated with the region's natural attractions. Canoeing and fishing are available on the Caddo River, which flows through the city before widening into DeGray Lake. The Little Missouri Falls area is a day-use area featuring picnic areas with grills, a hiking trail, and scenic overlook. Crater of Diamonds State Park, DeGray Lake Resort State Park, Lake Greeson and Lake Ouachita are also nearby, offering further recreational opportunities to residents and visitors.

== Education ==
Public education for elementary and secondary school students in almost all of the municipality (almost all of the portion in Pike County) is provided by Centerpoint School District. Area students graduate from Centerpoint High School.

The Amity School District merged with the Glenwood School District to form the Centerpoint district on July 1, 1995.

A small sliver within Montgomery County is in the Caddo Hills School District, which graduates students via Caddo Hills High School.

A small sliver in Pike County is in the Kirby School District, which graduates students through Kirby High School.

== Media ==
Glenwood is served by KHGZ radio.

== Notable person ==
- Clark Duke, comedian, actor, and director

== See also ==
- List of cities and towns in Arkansas
