= Hydrellia pakistanae =

Scientific classification
- Kingdom: Animalia
- Phylum: Arthropoda
- Class: Insecta
- Order: Diptera
- Family: Ephydridae
- Subfamily: Hydrelliinae
- Tribe: Hydrelliini
- Genus: Hydrellia
- Species: H. pakistanae

Binomial name
- Hydrellia pakistanae Deonier, 1978

Species of fly

Hydrellia pakistanae is a species of fly in the shore fly family, Ephydridae. It is known as the Asian hydrilla leaf-mining fly. It is used as an agent of biological pest control against the noxious aquatic plant hydrilla (Hydrilla verticillata).

The adult fly is about 1.5 millimeters long, dark gray in color with a shiny metallic gold or silver face. The female lays eggs on the leaves of hydrilla above the surface of the water. In about three days the tiny eggs hatch, releasing the small white or yellow-green larvae. The larva of this fly is a leaf miner. It enters the flesh of the leaf and digs tunnels through it as it feeds. The larva eats nearly all of the inner tissue of the leaf before moving on to the next leaf. One larva finishes an average of twelve leaves during its two-week larval period. It then pupates for about a week and emerges as an adult.

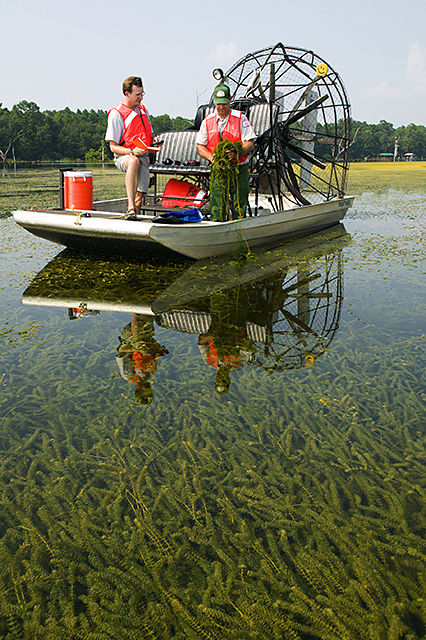
Hydrilla verticillata collection on Lake Seminole, Florida

This insect has been shown to be effective in the destruction of hydrilla. The photosynthetic ability of the leaf is reduced with even a small amount of larva damage, and the feeding injury becomes susceptible to opportunistic fungal infection. The buoyancy of the plant is reduced. As the infestation progresses, holes emerge in the hydrilla mat as plants begin to die and sink. As the hydrilla is eliminated, native plants can move in to repopulate the area. This fly is native to India and Pakistan, and it is currently established in hydrilla-prone areas in the southeastern United States where it was successfully introduced. It does best in warm areas and tends to be much less effective in areas that get cold.
