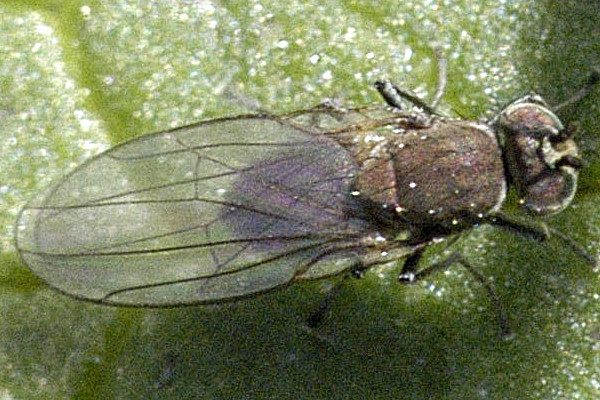

Scientific classification
- Kingdom: Animalia
- Phylum: Arthropoda
- Class: Insecta
- Order: Diptera
- Family: Ephydridae
- Subfamily: Hydrelliinae
- Tribe: Hydrelliini
- Genus: Hydrellia; Robineau-Desvoidy, 1830

Diversity
- at least 240 species

Synonyms
- Hydropota Rondani, 1861; Hidropota Lioy, 1864

= Hydrellia =

Genus of flies

Hydrellia is a genus of shore flies in the family Ephydridae. There are more than 240 described species in Hydrellia.

== See also ==
- List of Hydrellia species
