= National Register of Historic Places listings in Clark County, Arkansas =

Location of Clark County in Arkansas

Clark County, Arkansas, United States, has 44 properties listed on the National Register of Historic Places, including one site, Elkin's Ferry, which is part of the Camden Expedition Sites, a National Historic Landmark District associated with events of the Civil War. Another two properties were once listed but have been removed.

The locations of National Register properties for which the latitude and longitude coordinates are included below may be seen in a map.

Contents: Counties in Arkansas
- Arkansas
- Ashley
- Baxter
- Benton
- Boone
- Bradley
- Calhoun
- Carroll
- Chicot
- Clark
- Clay
- Cleburne
- Cleveland
- Columbia
- Conway
- Craighead
- Crawford
- Crittenden
- Cross
- Dallas
- Desha
- Drew
- Faulkner
- Franklin
- Fulton
- Garland
- Grant
- Greene
- Hempstead
- Hot Spring
- Howard
- Independence
- Izard
- Jackson
- Jefferson
- Johnson
- Lafayette
- Lawrence
- Lee
- Lincoln
- Little River
- Logan
- Lonoke
- Madison
- Marion
- Miller
- Mississippi
- Monroe
- Montgomery
- Nevada
- Newton
- Ouachita
- Perry
- Phillips
- Pike
- Poinsett
- Polk
- Pope
- Prairie
- Pulaski (Little Rock)
- Randolph
- St. Francis
- Saline
- Scott
- Searcy
- Sebastian
- Sevier
- Sharp
- Stone
- Union
- Van Buren
- Washington
- White
- Woodruff
- Yell

This National Park Service list is complete through NPS recent listings posted October 30, 2026.

== Current listings ==
	Name on the Register	Image	Date listed	Location	City or town	Description
1	Arkadelphia Boy Scout Hut	Arkadelphia Boy Scout Hut	January 28, 2002 (#01001526)	8th St. 34°07′45″N 93°03′16″W	Arkadelphia	
2	Arkadelphia Commercial Historic District	Arkadelphia Commercial Historic District	July 20, 2011 (#11000464)	Roughly Main St. between 5th & 7th Sts., & Clinton St between 6th & 9th Sts. 34°07′12″N 93°03′13″W	Arkadelphia	1870-1961 commercial core of Clark County
3	Arkadelphia Confederate Monument	Arkadelphia Confederate Monument	May 3, 1996 (#96000507)	Courthouse lawn, near the southwestern corner of the junction of Court and Clay Sts. 34°07′12″N 93°03′03″W	Arkadelphia	
4	Arkansas 7/51 Bridge	Arkansas 7/51 Bridge	February 1, 2006 (#05001591)	Highways 7 and 51; 34°07′23″N 93°02′47″W	Arkadelphia	1933 Parker Through Truss spanning the Ouachita River
5	James E. M. Barkman House	James E. M. Barkman House	July 30, 1974 (#74000467)	406 N. 10th St. 34°07′31″N 93°03′22″W	Arkadelphia	ca. 1860 house in Greek and Gothic Revival styles
6	Bayou Sel		September 10, 1974 (#74000468)	Address Restricted	Arkadelphia	
7	Nannie Gresham Biscoe House	Nannie Gresham Biscoe House	January 21, 2004 (#03001450)	227 Cherry St. 34°07′22″N 93°02′57″W	Arkadelphia	
8	Dr. Boaz House	Dr. Boaz House	January 28, 1992 (#91002014)	Highway 26; 34°04′23″N 93°22′19″W	Clear Spring	
9	Bozeman House	Bozeman House	November 14, 1978 (#78000576)	West of Arkadelphia on Highway 26; 34°05′44″N 93°09′03″W	Arkadelphia	
10	Clark County Courthouse	Clark County Courthouse	December 1, 1978 (#78000577)	4th and Crittenden Sts. 34°07′06″N 93°03′03″W	Arkadelphia	
11	Clark County Library	Clark County Library	November 5, 1974 (#74000469)	609 Caddo St. 34°07′14″N 93°03′15″W	Arkadelphia	
12	Clear Springs Tabernacle	Clear Springs Tabernacle	February 13, 1992 (#92000057)	Junction of Highway 26 and Bobo Rd. 34°03′23″N 93°23′31″W	Okolona	
13	DeGray Creek Bridge	DeGray Creek Bridge	January 21, 2010 (#09001239)	County Road 50 over DeGray Creek; 34°09′37″N 93°11′21″W	Arkadelphia	Washed away by flooding.
14	Domestic Science Building	Domestic Science Building	December 22, 1982 (#82000800)	11th and Haddock; 34°06′19″N 93°03′35″W	Arkadelphia	
15	Elkins' Ferry	Elkins' Ferry	April 19, 1994 (#94001182)	Both banks of the Little Missouri River, about 10 miles north of Prescott; 33°56′09″N 93°21′12″W	Prescott	Site of the Civil War Battle of Elkin's Ferry; one of the Camden Expedition Sites, a National Historic Landmark consisting of sites in several counties; extends into Nevada County
16	Horace Estes House	Horace Estes House	September 21, 1993 (#93000487)	614 E. Main St. 33°55′00″N 93°08′48″W	Gurdon	
17	Flanagin Law Office	Flanagin Law Office	December 22, 1977 (#77000245)	320 Clay St. 34°07′08″N 93°03′03″W	Arkadelphia	
18	Gurdon Jail	Gurdon Jail	November 13, 1989 (#89001959)	W. Joslyn and Front Sts. 33°55′11″N 93°09′14″W	Gurdon	
19	Habicht-Cohn-Crow House	Habicht-Cohn-Crow House	October 3, 1985 (#85002717)	8th and Pine; 34°07′21″N 93°03′21″W	Arkadelphia	1870 Greek Revival house
20	Henderson State University Historic District	Henderson State University Historic District	August 8, 2023 (#100008977)	1100 Henderson St.; also 817 University Street and 586 North 10th Street; 34°07′32″N 93°03′33″W	Arkadelphia	Second set of addresses represent a boundary increase approved September 11, 2026.
21	Capt. Charles C. Henderson House	Capt. Charles C. Henderson House	August 24, 1998 (#98000957)	Junction of 10th and Henderson Sts. 34°07′12″N 93°03′25″W	Arkadelphia	
22	Highway A-2 Bridges		January 16, 2026 (#100012572)	Hudman Road. approximately 0.05 to 0.3 miles south of Hasley Road; 34°00′16″N 93°05′49″W	Curtis	
23	Hoo Hoo Monument	Hoo Hoo Monument	September 2, 1999 (#94000821)	1st St. 33°55′13″N 93°09′14″W	Gurdon	
24	Hudson-Jones House	Hudson-Jones House	September 30, 1982 (#82002096)	East of Arkadelphia on Highway 2; 34°04′11″N 92°56′33″W	Arkadelphia	
25	Loy Kirksey House	Loy Kirksey House	February 3, 1992 (#91000586)	County Road 59 west of De Gray Lake; 34°14′02″N 93°17′45″W	Fendley	
26	Little Missouri River Bridge	Little Missouri River Bridge	April 9, 1990 (#90000536)	formerly County Road 179, over the Little Missouri River; 33°54′10″N 93°18′35″W	Prescott	Bridge appears to be closed to traffic.
27	Magnolia Manor	Magnolia Manor	September 27, 1972 (#72000200)	0.6 miles southwest of the junction of Interstate 30 and Highway 51; 34°06′44″N 93°06′20″W	Arkadelphia	
28	Missouri-Pacific Railroad Depot-Arkadelphia	Missouri-Pacific Railroad Depot-Arkadelphia	June 11, 1992 (#92000599)	S. 5th St. 34°07′05″N 93°03′09″W	Arkadelphia	
29	Missouri-Pacific Railroad Depot-Gurdon	Missouri-Pacific Railroad Depot-Gurdon	June 11, 1992 (#92000609)	Northwest of the junction of N. 1st and E. Walnut Sts. 33°55′14″N 93°09′07″W	Gurdon	
30	Okolona Colored High School Gymnasium	Okolona Colored High School Gymnasium	September 23, 2011 (#11000686)	767 Layne St. 33°59′35″N 93°20′23″W	Okolona	
31	Old Arkansas 51, Curtis to Gum Springs	Old Arkansas 51, Curtis to Gum Springs	January 21, 2004 (#03001457)	West of U.S. Route 67, starting approximately 0.5 miles south of the junction of U.S. Route 67 and Curtis Cemetery Rd., and ending at its junction with Highway 26; 34°01′58″N 93°06′18″W	Curtis	
32	Old Bank of Amity	Old Bank of Amity	June 5, 1991 (#91000690)	Northwestern corner of the town square 34°15′55″N 93°27′40″W	Amity	
33	Old US 67 Rest Area	Old US 67 Rest Area	October 5, 2006 (#06000907)	Western side of Old U.S. Route 67, approx. 0.5 miles south of Middleton; 34°01′12″N 93°06′35″W	Curtis	
34	Peake High School	Peake High School	January 19, 2005 (#04001499)	1600 Caddo St. 34°07′17″N 93°04′03″W	Arkadelphia	
35	Ronoake Baptist Church	Ronoake Baptist Church	September 23, 2011 (#11000687)	North end of Ronoake Baptist Church Rd. 33°56′33″N 93°08′48″W	Gurdon vicinity	
36	Rose Hill Cemetery	Rose Hill Cemetery	February 1, 1999 (#98000613)	1200 block of Main St. 34°07′07″N 93°03′41″W	Arkadelphia	
37	Rosedale Plantation Barn	Rosedale Plantation Barn	January 21, 2004 (#03001451)	879 Old Military Rd. 34°09′41″N 93°06′07″W	Arkadelphia	
38	Ross Site (3CL401)		October 10, 1985 (#85003133)	Address Restricted	Whelen Springs	
39	Jane Ross House		January 14, 2025 (#100011313)	1049 Henderson Street; 34°07′32″N 93°03′32″W	Arkadelphia	
40	June Sandidge House	June Sandidge House	February 25, 1993 (#93000093)	811 Cherry St. 33°55′21″N 93°08′41″W	Gurdon	
41	C. E. Thompson General Store and House	C. E. Thompson General Store and House	April 4, 2001 (#01000302)	3100 Hollywood; 34°07′03″N 93°05′49″W	Arkadelphia	
42	US 67 Bridge over Little Missouri River	US 67 Bridge over Little Missouri River	January 24, 2007 (#06001271)	U.S. Route 67; 33°52′48″N 93°18′16″W	Prescott	Extends into Nevada County.
43	John Duke Wells Health, Physical Education, and Recreation Building		February 12, 2025 (#100011297)	1192 M. H. Russell Drive; 34°08′00″N 93°03′41″W	Arkadelphia	
44	W. H. Young House	W. H. Young House	September 20, 2006 (#06000842)	316 Meador Ln. 34°07′32″N 93°02′21″W	Arkadelphia	

== Former listing ==
	Name on the Register	Image	Date listed	Date removed	Location	City or town	Description
1	Benjamin Mercantile Building		September 5, 1990 (#90001378)	January 14, 2002	410 Main Street	Arkadelphia	
2	Cobb-Weber House		September 14, 2002 (#02000956)	January 26, 2006	307 N. 6th Street	Arkadelphia	Delisted after being relocated to Washington in April, 2005
3	McNeely Creek Bridge	McNeely Creek Bridge	May 26, 2004 (#04000495)	September 1, 2022	County Road 12; 33°53′20″N 93°12′34″W	Beirne	

== See also ==
- List of National Historic Landmarks in Arkansas
- National Register of Historic Places listings in Arkansas
