= Arkadelphia Confederate Monument =

- U.S. National Register of Historic Places
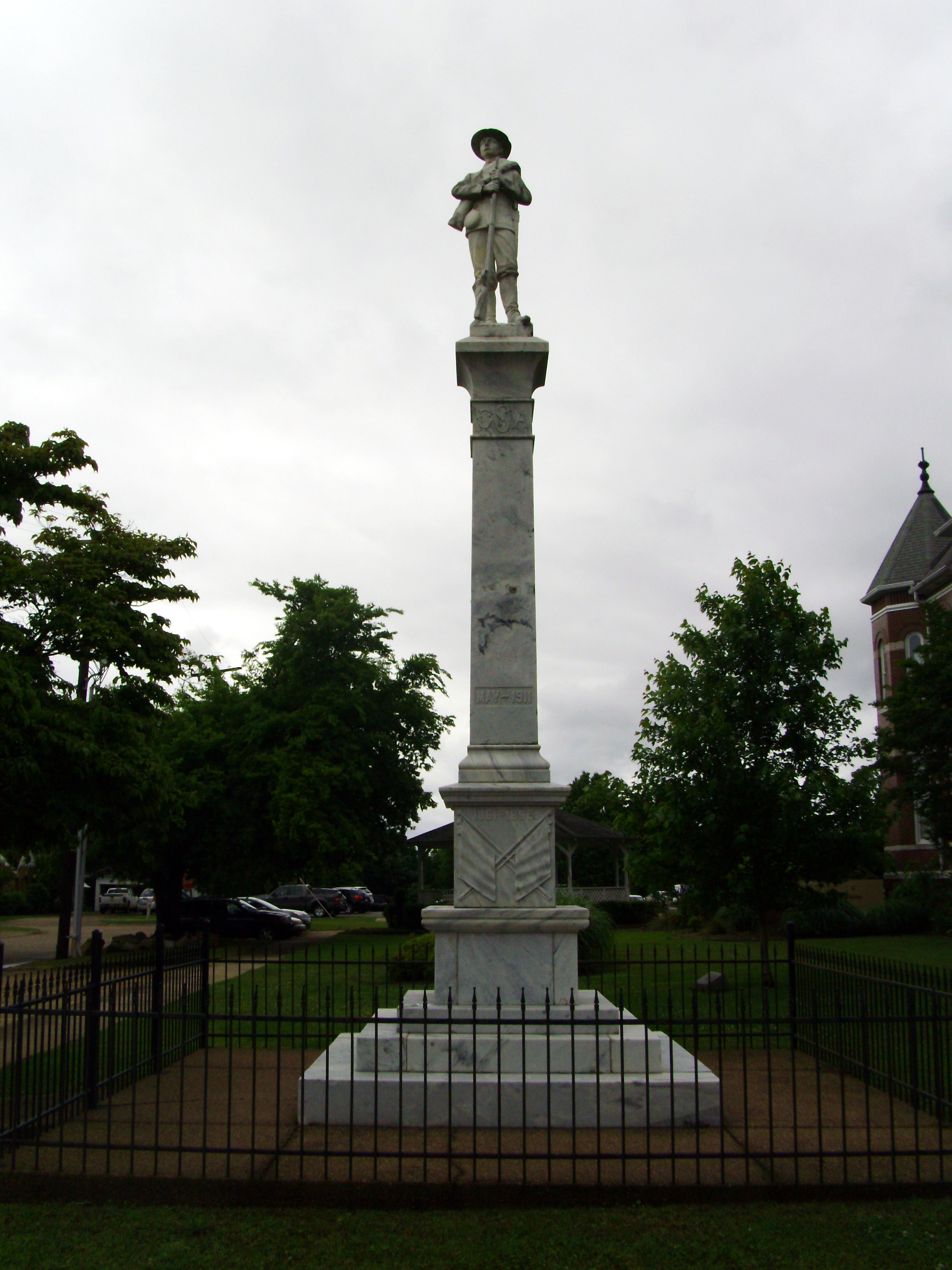

- Location within Arkansas Location within the United States
- Location: Courthouse Lawn, near SE of jct. of 6th and Caddo Sts., Arkadelphia, Arkansas
- Coordinates: 34°7′12″N 93°3′3″W
- Area: less than one acre
- Built: 1911
- Architectural style: Classical Revival
- MPS: Civil War Commemorative Sculpture MPS
- NRHP reference No.: 96000507
- Added to NRHP: May 3, 1996

The Arkadelphia Confederate Monument is located on the grounds of the Clark County Courthouse in Arkadelphia, Arkansas. The sculpture, which depicts a Confederate Army soldier, was carved from Italian marble, and is mounted on a base of Georgia marble. It was designed and executed by R. P. Phillips in 1911, with funding from the local chapter of the United Daughters of the Confederacy.

The monument was listed on the National Register of Historic Places in 1996.

== See also ==
- National Register of Historic Places listings in Clark County, Arkansas
