= Terry Nelson (American football) =

American football player (born 1951)

No. 83
- Position: Tight end

Personal information
- Born: May 20, 1951 (age 75); Arkadelphia, Arkansas, U.S.
- Listed height: 6 ft 2 in (1.88 m)
- Listed weight: 233 lb (106 kg)

Career information
- High school: Peake
- College: Arkansas–Pine Bluff
- NFL draft: 1973: 4th round, 99th overall pick

Career history
- Los Angeles Rams (1973–1980)

Career NFL statistics
- Receptions: 87
- Receiving yards: 1,113
- Receiving touchdowns: 6
- Stats at Pro Football Reference

Terry Louis Nelson (born May 20, 1951), is an American former professional football player who was a tight end for eight seasons the Los Angeles Rams of the National Football League (NFL). He played college football for the Arkansas–Pine Bluff Golden Lions. Nelson played from 1973 to 1980 for the Rams wearing #83. He was a starter in Super Bowl XIV.
