= Old US 67 Rest Area =

- U.S. National Register of Historic Places
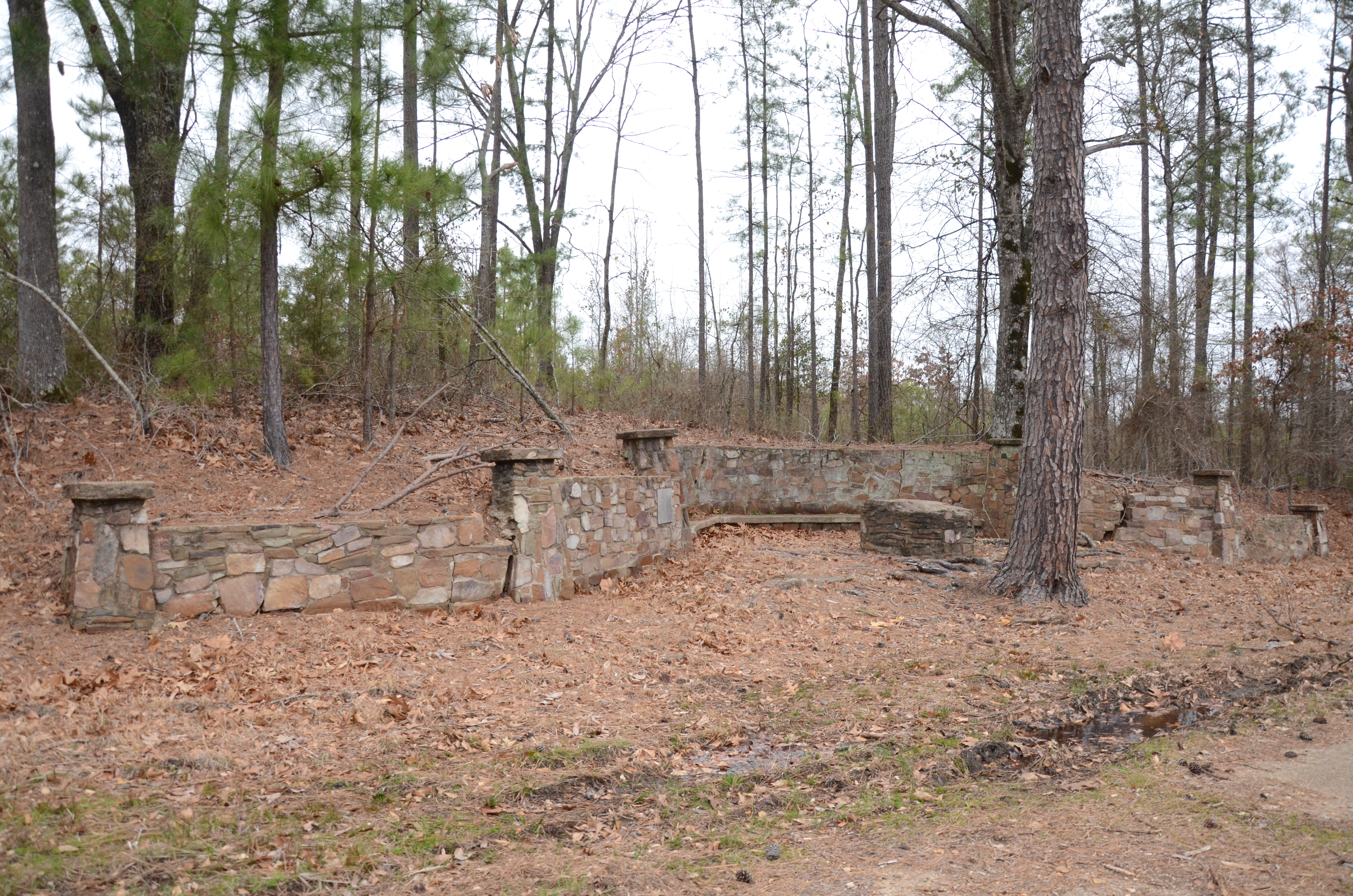

- Location within Arkansas Location within the United States
- Nearest city: Curtis, Arkansas
- Coordinates: 34°1′12″N 93°6′35″W
- Area: less than one acre
- Built: 1936
- Built by: National Youth Administration; Arkansas Highway and Transportation
- MPS: New Deal Recovery Efforts in Arkansas MPS
- NRHP reference No.: 06000907
- Added to NRHP: October 5, 2006

The Old US 67 Rest Area is a historic roadside rest area in rural Clark County, Arkansas. It is located in on the west side of U.S. Route 67 (US 67) and an old paved section formerly designated Highway 51, between the small towns of Curtis and Gum Springs. The rest area consists of a semicircular fieldstone retaining wall, which is segmented by six fieldstone pillars. A semicircular concrete bench stands facing a fieldstone well. The rest area was built five years after US 67 was paved in 1931, by the National Youth Administration, a federal New Deal agency, and the state highway department.

Near the third pillar is a plaque which says:

BUILT BY
NATIONAL YOUTH
ADMINISTRATION
IN COOPERATION WITH
ARKANSAS STATE
HIGHWAY DEPARTMENT
1936

The rest area was listed on the National Register of Historic Places in 2006.

== See also ==
- National Register of Historic Places listings in Clark County, Arkansas
