= Loy Kirksey House =

Historic house in Arkansas, United States

- U.S. National Register of Historic Places
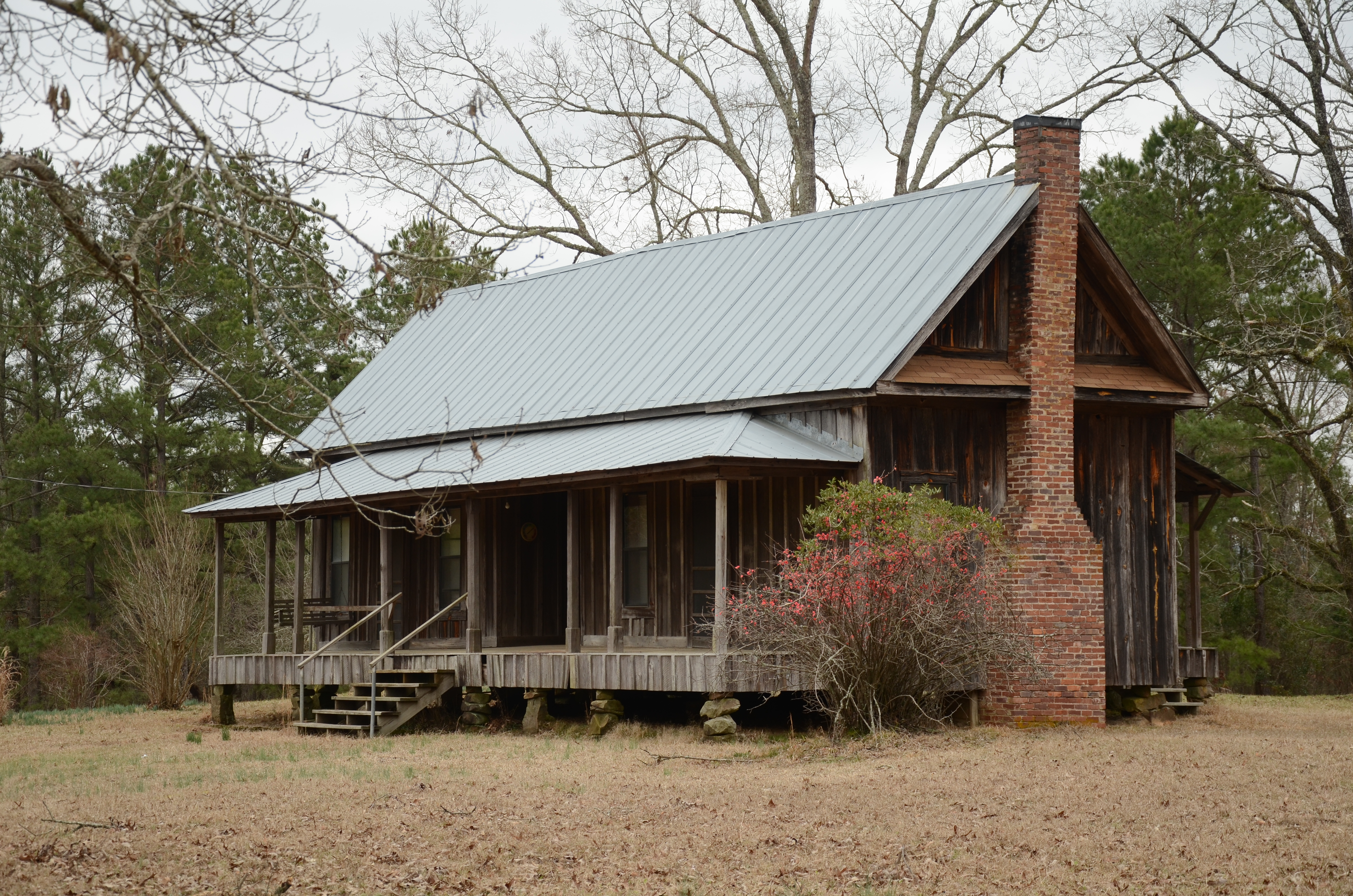

- Location within Arkansas Location within the United States
- Nearest city: Fendley, Arkansas
- Coordinates: 34°14′2″N 93°17′45″W
- Area: 1.5 acres (0.61 ha)
- Built: 1895
- Built by: William Kirksey
- Architectural style: Dog-trot
- NRHP reference No.: 91000586
- Added to NRHP: February 3, 1992

The Loy Kirksey House is a historic house in rural Clark County, Arkansas. It is located on the south side of Still Creek Road (County Road 59) east of the hamlet of Fendley. This single-story dog trot house was built in stages, beginning with a single log pen that probably predates the American Civil War. Around 1895 this structure was expanded to form the dog-trot by William Kirksey. The only significant alteration since then is the replacement of the original chimney in the mid-20th century with the present brick one. The property also includes two single-story log barns built in the early decades of the 20th century.

The house was listed on the National Register of Historic Places in 1992.

== See also ==
- National Register of Historic Places listings in Clark County, Arkansas
