= Flanagin Law Office =

- U.S. National Register of Historic Places
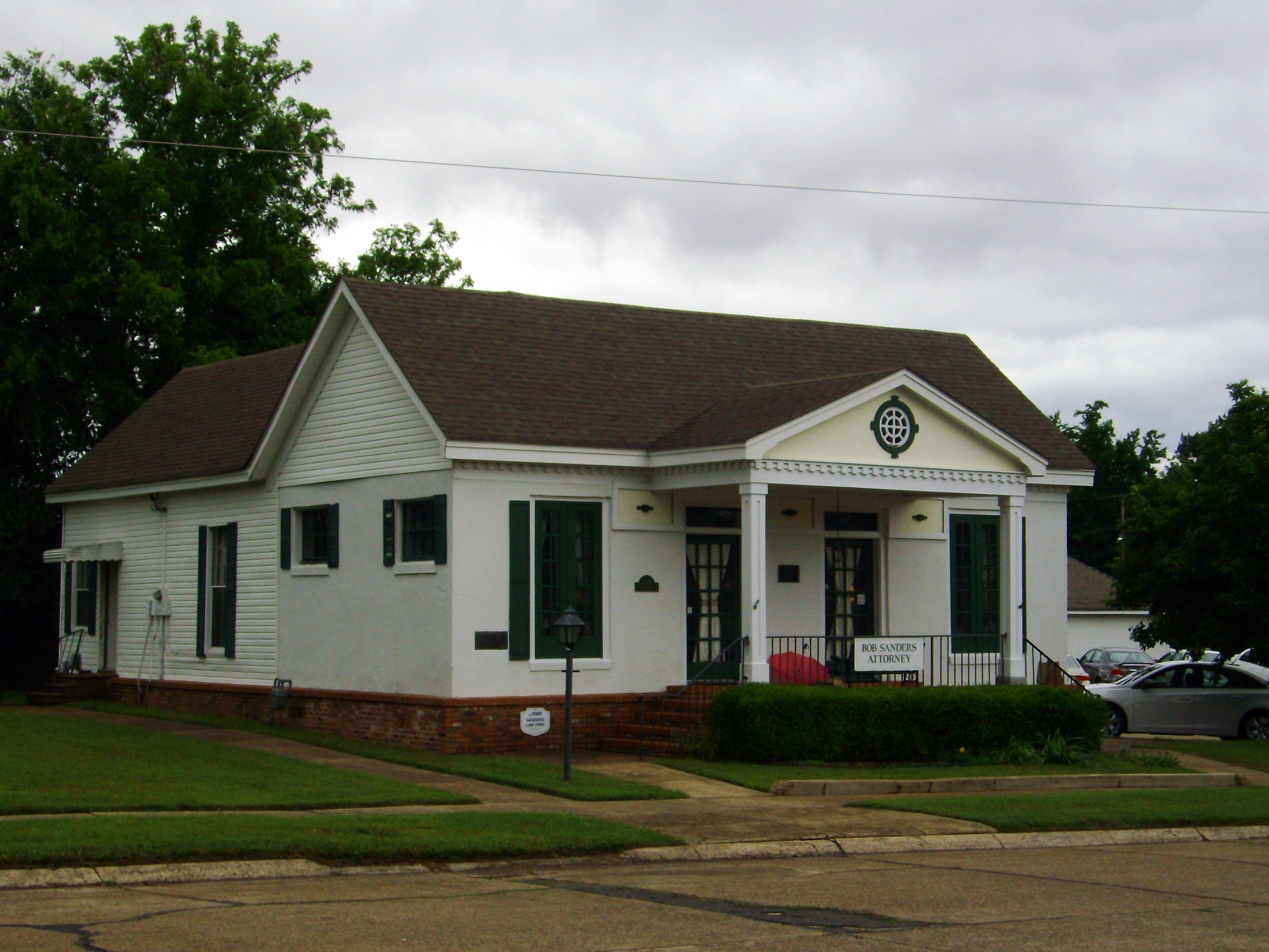
- Main façade of the Flanagin Law Office

- Location within Arkansas Location within the United States
- Location: 320 Clay St., Arkadelphia, Arkansas
- Coordinates: 34°7′8″N 93°3′3″W
- Area: less than one acre
- Built: 1858
- Built by: J. H. O'Baugh
- NRHP reference No.: 77000245
- Added to NRHP: December 22, 1977

The Flanagin Law Office is a historic office building at 320 Clay Street in Arkadelphia, Arkansas. The front brick portion of the building was built in 1858 for J. L. Witherspoon, a local attorney, who later became Attorney General of Arkansas and sat on the state's high court. Witherspoon took on Harris Flanagin as a partner; Flanagin served as Governor of Arkansas during the American Civil War, and used this building as a law office for many years. Flanagin's son had the wood-frame rear section added, converting the building into a residence. It has since been converted back to a law office.

The building was listed on the National Register of Historic Places in 1977.

== See also ==
- National Register of Historic Places listings in Clark County, Arkansas
