= Bayou Sel =

Archaeological site in Arkansas, United States

- U.S. National Register of Historic Places
- Nearest city: Arkadelphia, Arkansas
- Area: 5 acres (2.0 ha)
- Built: 1811
- NRHP reference No.: 74000468
- Added to NRHP: September 10, 1974

Bayou Sel is a prehistoric and historic archaeological site in Clark County, Arkansas, near Arkadelphia. The site has archaeological remains, including finds relating to the Caddoan culture, as well as prehistoric and historic evidence linking the site to the Quapaw. The Quapaw and early French settlers in the area are known to have manufactured salt in at the site, and it was here that a salt-processing operation was run in the first half of the 19th century.

The site was listed on the National Register of Historic Places in 1974.

== See also ==
- National Register of Historic Places listings in Clark County, Arkansas
