= Capt. Charles C. Henderson House =

Historic house in Arkadelphia, Arkansas, USA

- U.S. National Register of Historic Places
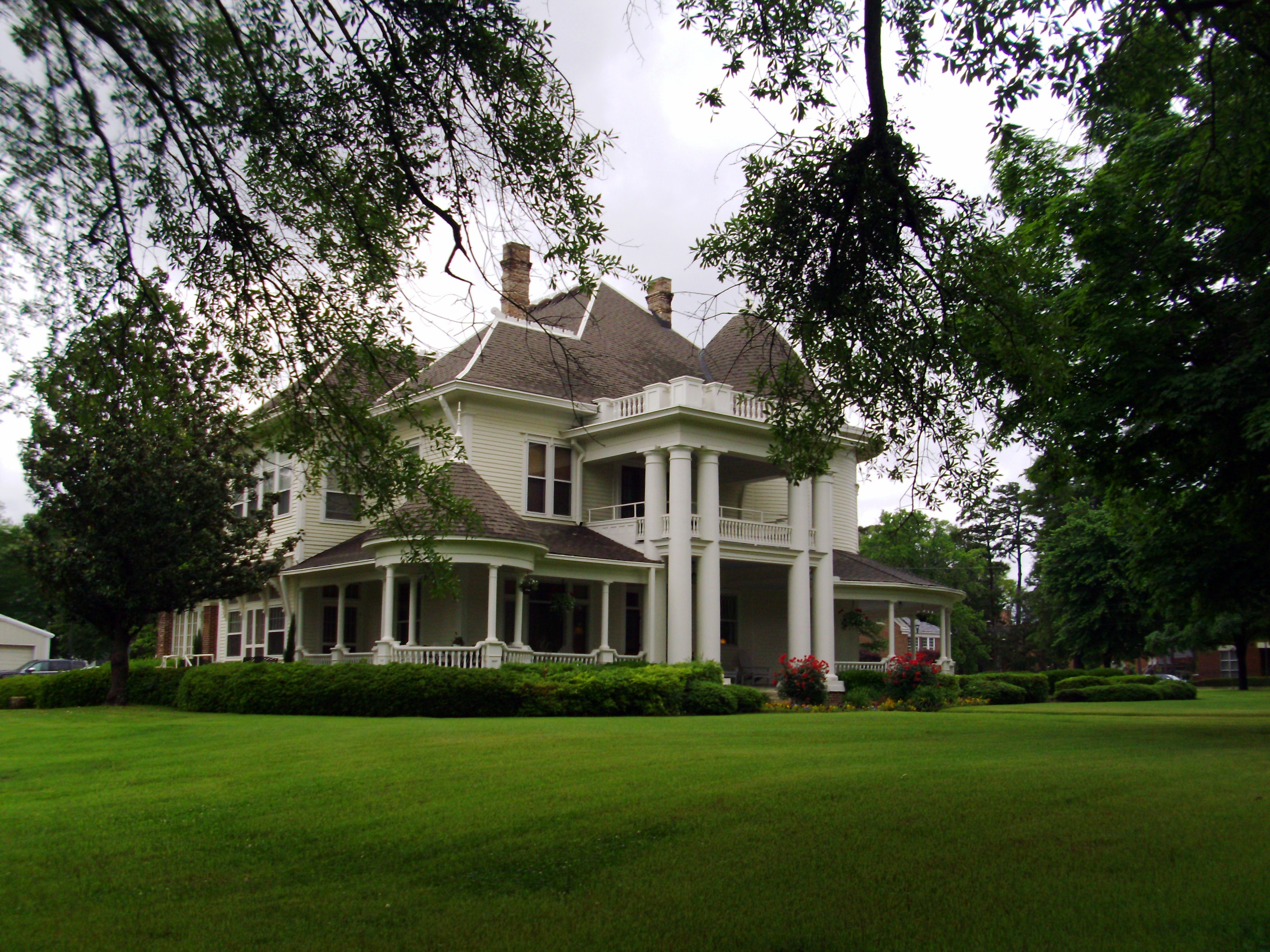

- Location within Arkansas Location within the United States
- Location: Jct. of 10th and Henderson Sts., Arkadelphia, Arkansas
- Coordinates: 34°7′12″N 93°3′25″W
- Area: 2 acres (0.81 ha)
- Built: 1906
- Architectural style: Bungalow/craftsman, Classical Revival, Queen Anne
- NRHP reference No.: 98000957
- Added to NRHP: August 24, 1998

The Capt. Charles C. Henderson House is a historic house at Henderson and 10th Streets in Arkadelphia, Arkansas. Built in 1906 and significantly altered in 1918–20, it is the largest and most elaborate house of that period on 10th Street. When first built, it was a 2 1/2-story hip-roofed Queen Anne style house with some Classical Revival elements. Its most prominent feature from this period is the turret with elaborate finial. In 1918-20 Henderson significantly modified the house, added the boxy two-story Craftsman-style porch. The house is now on the campus of Henderson State University.

The house was listed on the National Register of Historic Places in 1998.

== See also ==
- National Register of Historic Places listings in Clark County, Arkansas
