= Ronoake Baptist Church =

Historic church in Arkansas, United States

- U.S. National Register of Historic Places
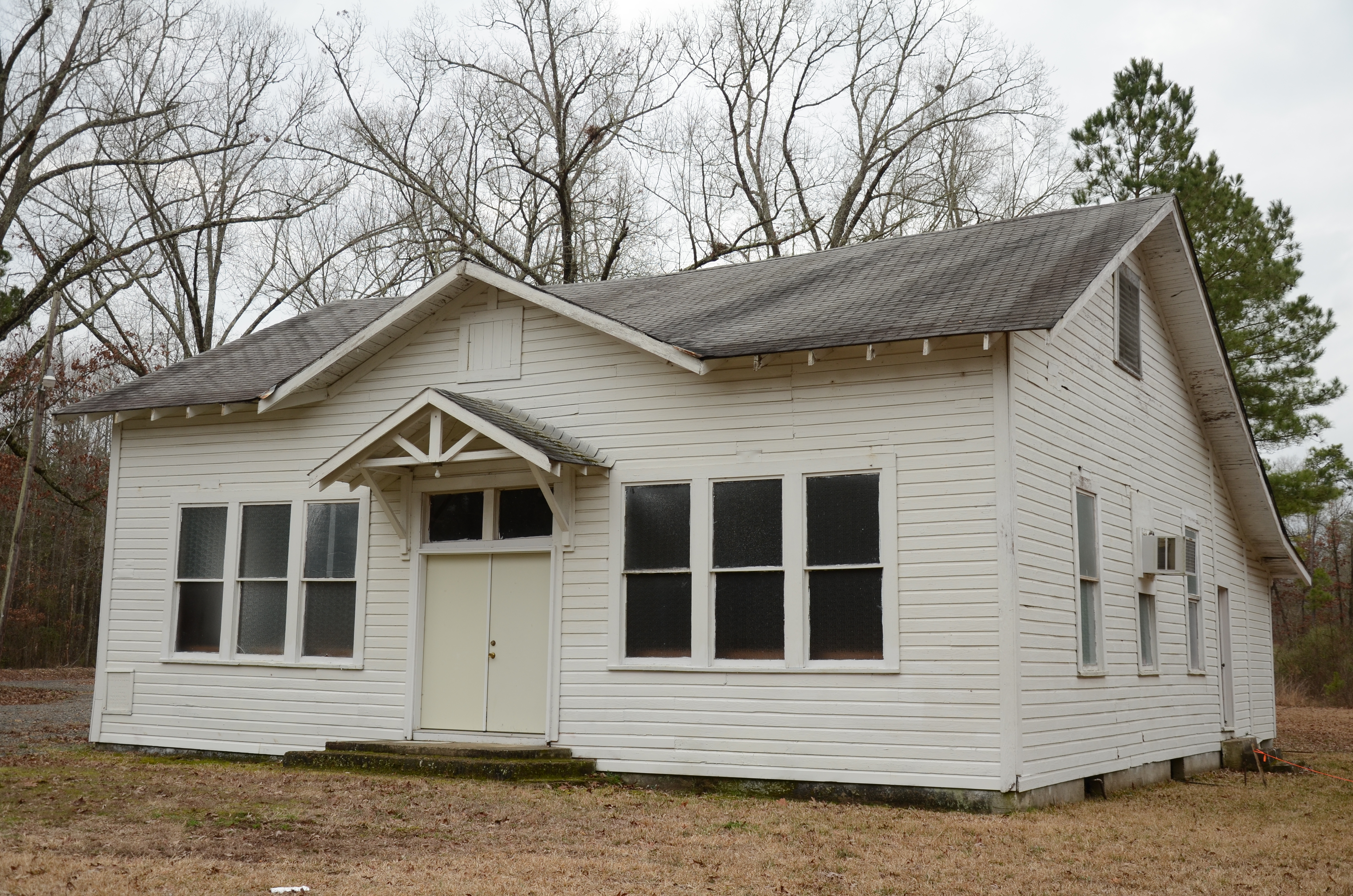

- Location within Arkansas Location within the United States
- Nearest city: Gurdon, Arkansas
- Coordinates: 33°56′33″N 93°08′48″W
- Area: 5 acres (2.0 ha)
- Architectural style: Craftsman
- NRHP reference No.: 11000687
- Added to NRHP: September 23, 2011

The Ronoake Baptist Church is a historic church in rural Clark County, Arkansas. The church is located at the end of Ronoake Church Road, off United States Route 67 north of Gurdon. The single-story wood-frame church was built in 1945 to serve an African-American congregation founded in 1893, and is an excellent example of Craftsman architecture. It has a low-pitch gable roof with broad eaves, with exposed rafter tails, kingpost supports, and banks of windows characteristic of the style. The fellowship hall in the church has a similar design and is from around the same time.

The church was listed on the National Register of Historic Places in 2011.

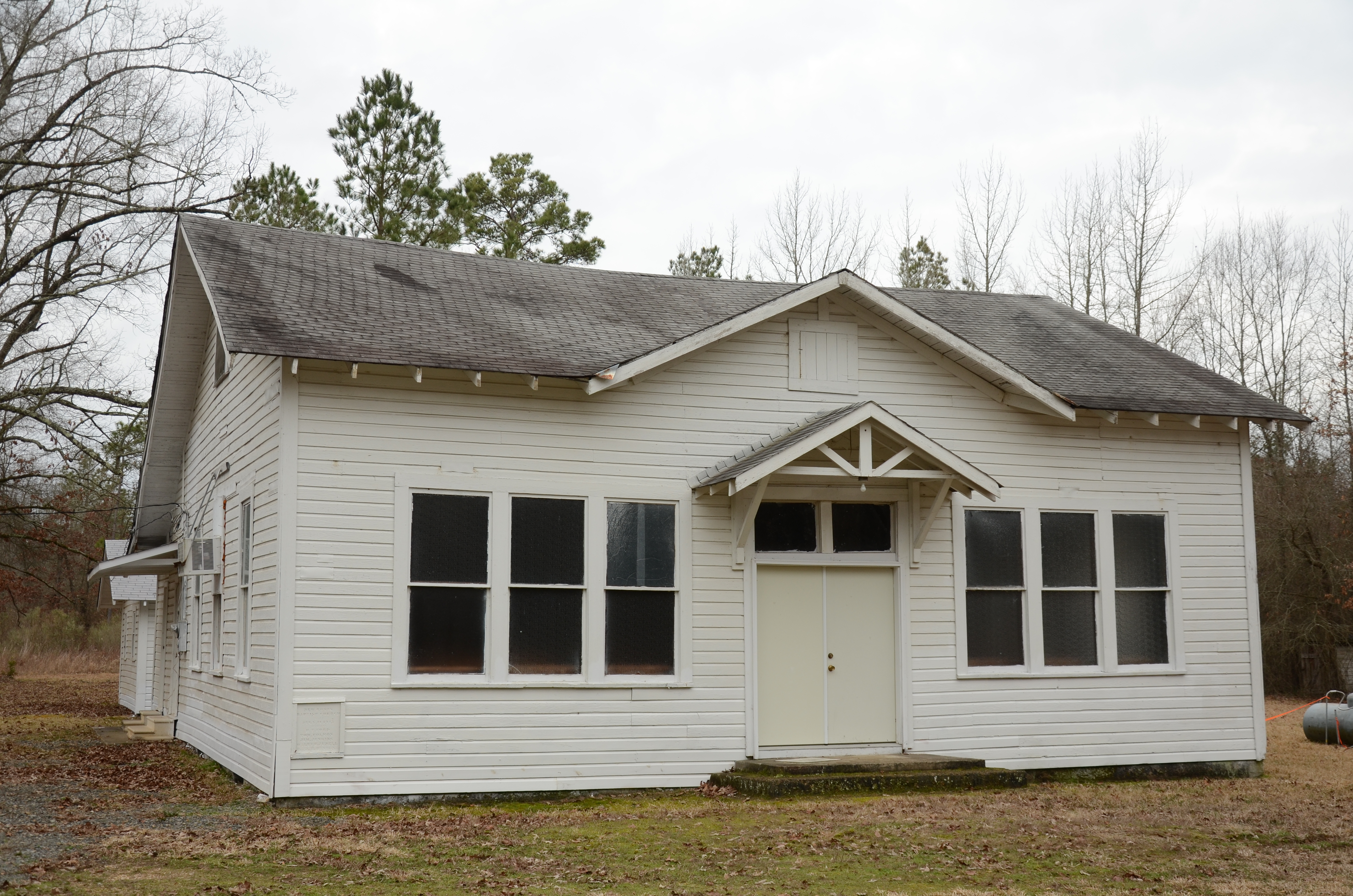

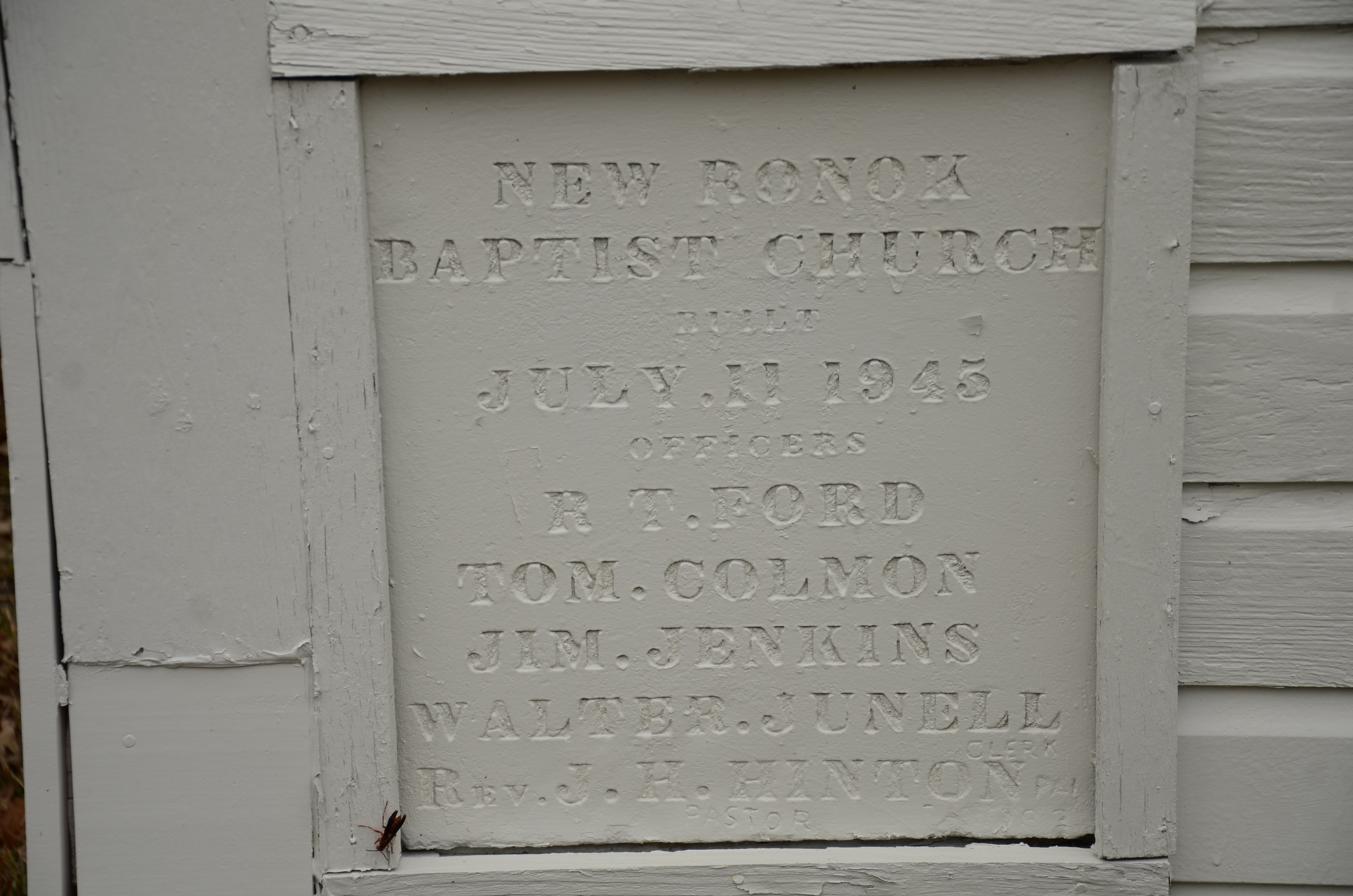

== See also ==
- National Register of Historic Places listings in Clark County, Arkansas
