= Rosedale Plantation Barn =

- U.S. National Register of Historic Places
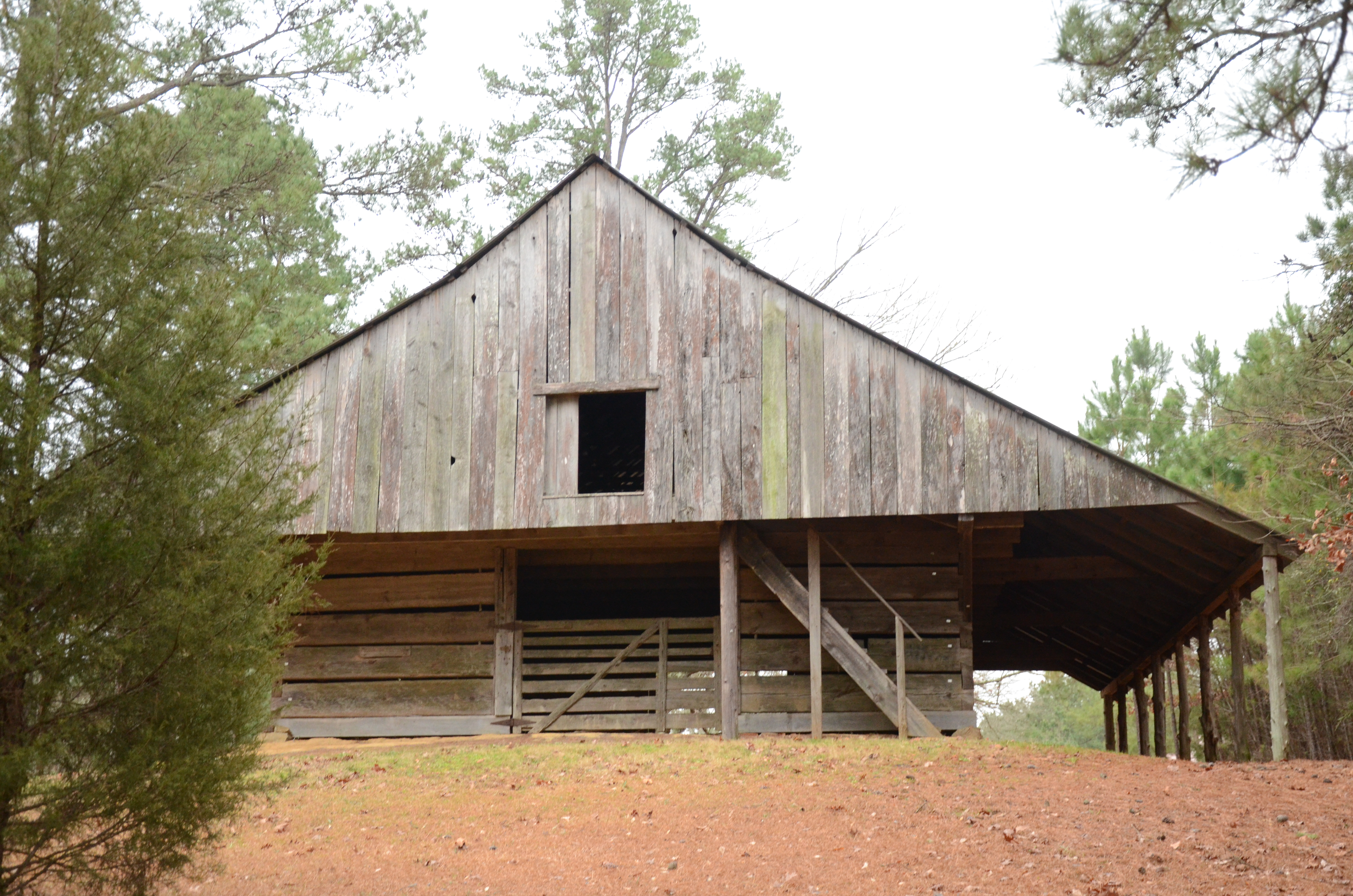

- Location within Arkansas Location within the United States
- Nearest city: Arkadelphia, Arkansas
- Coordinates: 34°9′41″N 93°6′7″W
- Area: 3 acres (1.2 ha)
- Built: 1860
- Built by: Griffin, Madison
- Architectural style: Hand-hewn Log Barn
- NRHP reference No.: 03001451
- Added to NRHP: January 21, 2004

The Rosedale Plantation Barn is a historic barn at 879 Old Military Road in Arkadelphia, Arkansas. The barn measures 30 feet (9.1 m) by 50 feet (15 m), and was constructed c. 1860 from hand-hewn logs. It is the last surviving structure of a slave plantation that was established in 1860, and was disassembled and reconstructed at its present location in 2002 to save it from demolition. It is believed to be the largest log barn in the state.

The barn was listed on the National Register of Historic Places in 2004.

== See also ==
- National Register of Historic Places listings in Clark County, Arkansas
