= Arkadelphia Commercial Historic District =

Historic district in Arkansas, United States

- U.S. National Register of Historic Places
- U.S. Historic district
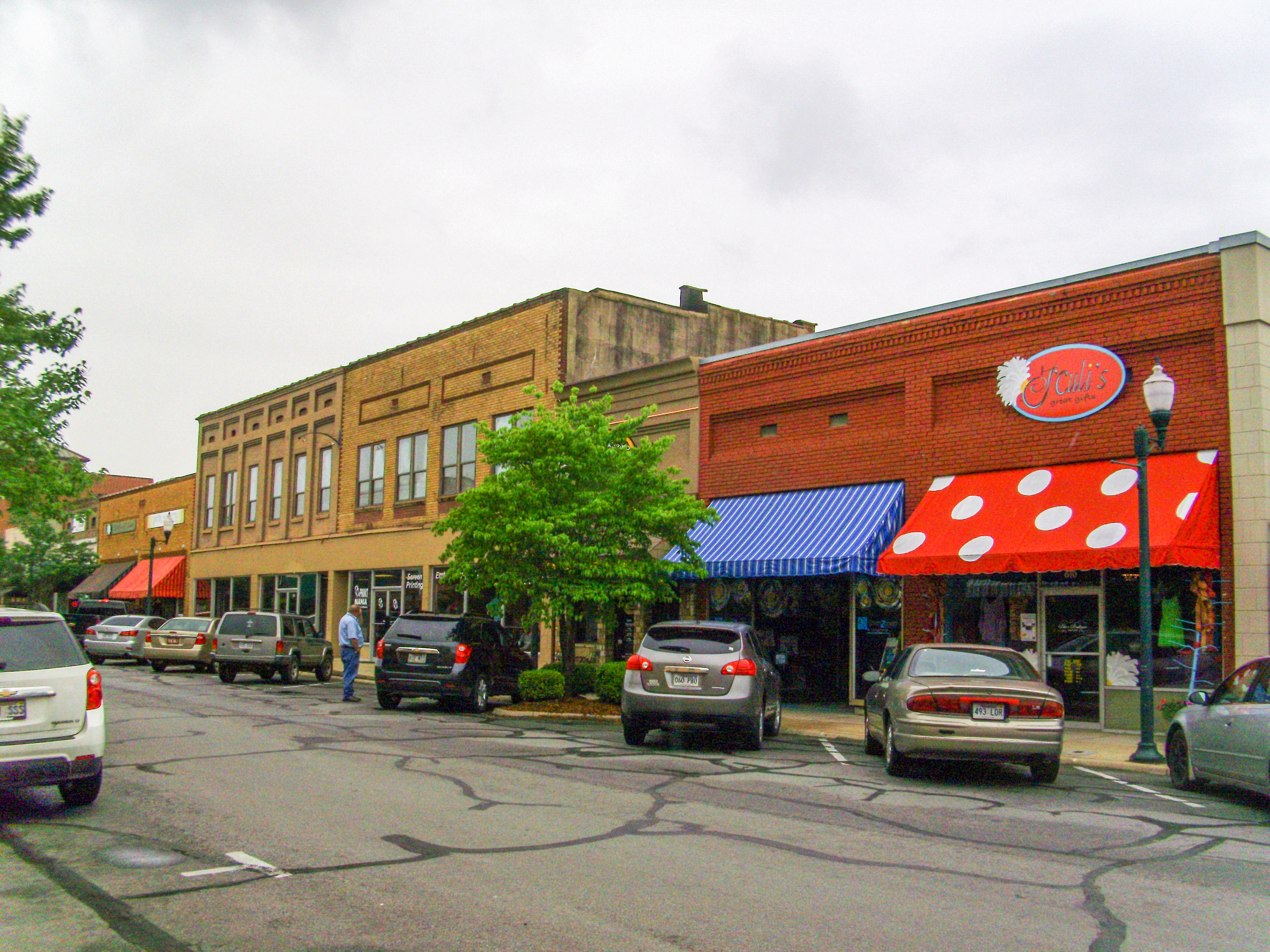

- Location within Arkansas Location within the United States
- Location: Roughly Main St. between 5th & 7th Sts., & Clinton St between 6th & 9th Sts., Arkadelphia, Arkansas
- Coordinates: 34.12032°N 93.05477°W
- Area: 7 acres (2.8 ha)
- Built: 1870
- Architectural style: Early Commercial, Classical Revival, Colonial revival
- NRHP reference No.: 11000464
- Added to NRHP: July 20, 2011

The Arkadelphia Commercial Historic District encompasses the historic commercial core of Arkadelphia, Arkansas, the county seat of Clark County. Arkadelphia was settled in 1842, and its commercial district is located in one of the older parts of the city, near the Ouachita River. Most of the buildings were built between c. 1890 and c. 1920, and are built out of brick and masonry; the oldest building in the district is estimated to have been built in 1870.

The district was listed on the National Register of Historic Places in 2011. The district consists of two blocks of Main Street, between 5th and 7th Streets, and three blocks of Clinton Street, between 6th and 9th Streets.

== See also ==
- National Register of Historic Places listings in Clark County, Arkansas
