= Ross Site =

Archaeological site in Arkansas, United States

- Ross Site (3CL401)
- U.S. National Register of Historic Places
- Nearest city: Whelen Springs, Arkansas
- Area: 2.7 acres (1.1 ha)
- NRHP reference No.: 85003133
- Added to NRHP: October 10, 1985

The Ross Site designated 3CL401, is a prehistoric archaeological site in Clark County, Arkansas, near the small town of Whelen Springs. The site includes two Native American mounds from the Caddoan culture, which have been dated to AD 1400–1600. It is one of a small number of Caddoan sites in southwestern Arkansas. The site was relatively unscathed until the mid-1980s, having never been plowed over, thus leaving intact potential ground-level features other than the mounds.

The site was listed on the National Register of Historic Places in 1985.

== See also ==
- National Register of Historic Places listings in Clark County, Arkansas
