= Habicht-Cohn-Crow House =

Historic house in Arkansas, United States

- U.S. National Register of Historic Places
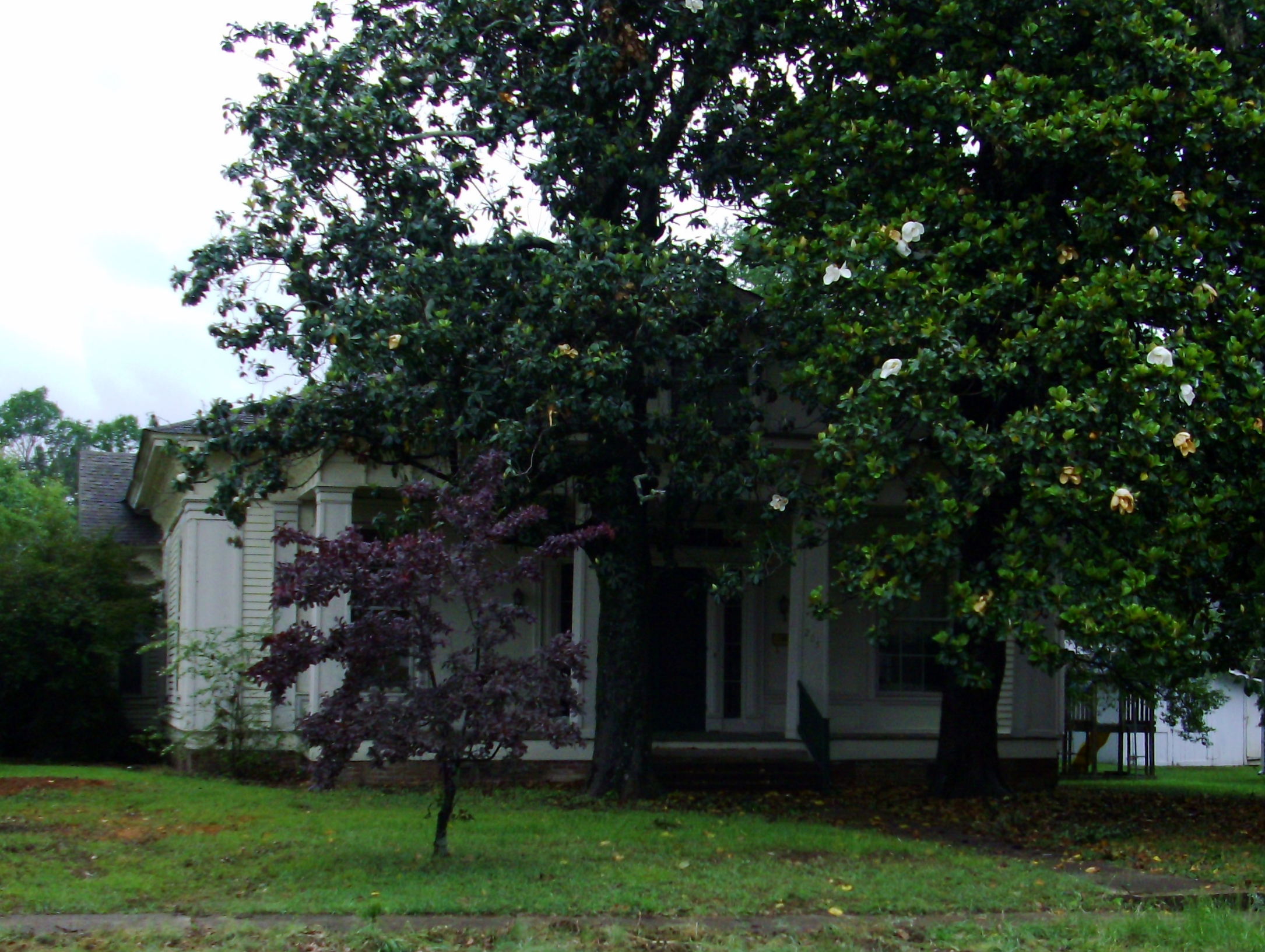

- Location within Arkansas Location within the United States
- Location: Eighth and Pine, Arkadelphia, Arkansas
- Coordinates: 34°7′21″N 93°3′21″W
- Area: less than one acre
- Built: 1870
- Architect: Mr. Gebhardt
- Architectural style: Greek Revival
- NRHP reference No.: 85002717
- Added to NRHP: October 3, 1985

The Habicht-Cohn-Crow House is a historic house at 8th and Pine in Arkadelphia, Arkansas. The single-story Greek Revival house was built in 1870 for Captain Anthony Habicht. Habicht sold the house in 1875 to M. M. Cohn, the founder of the regional MM Cohn department store chain. Cohn sold it five years later to A. M. Crow, a local land agent for the railroad.

The house was listed on the National Register of Historic Places in 1985.

== See also ==
- National Register of Historic Places listings in Clark County, Arkansas
