= June Sandidge House =

Historic house in Arkansas, United States

- U.S. National Register of Historic Places
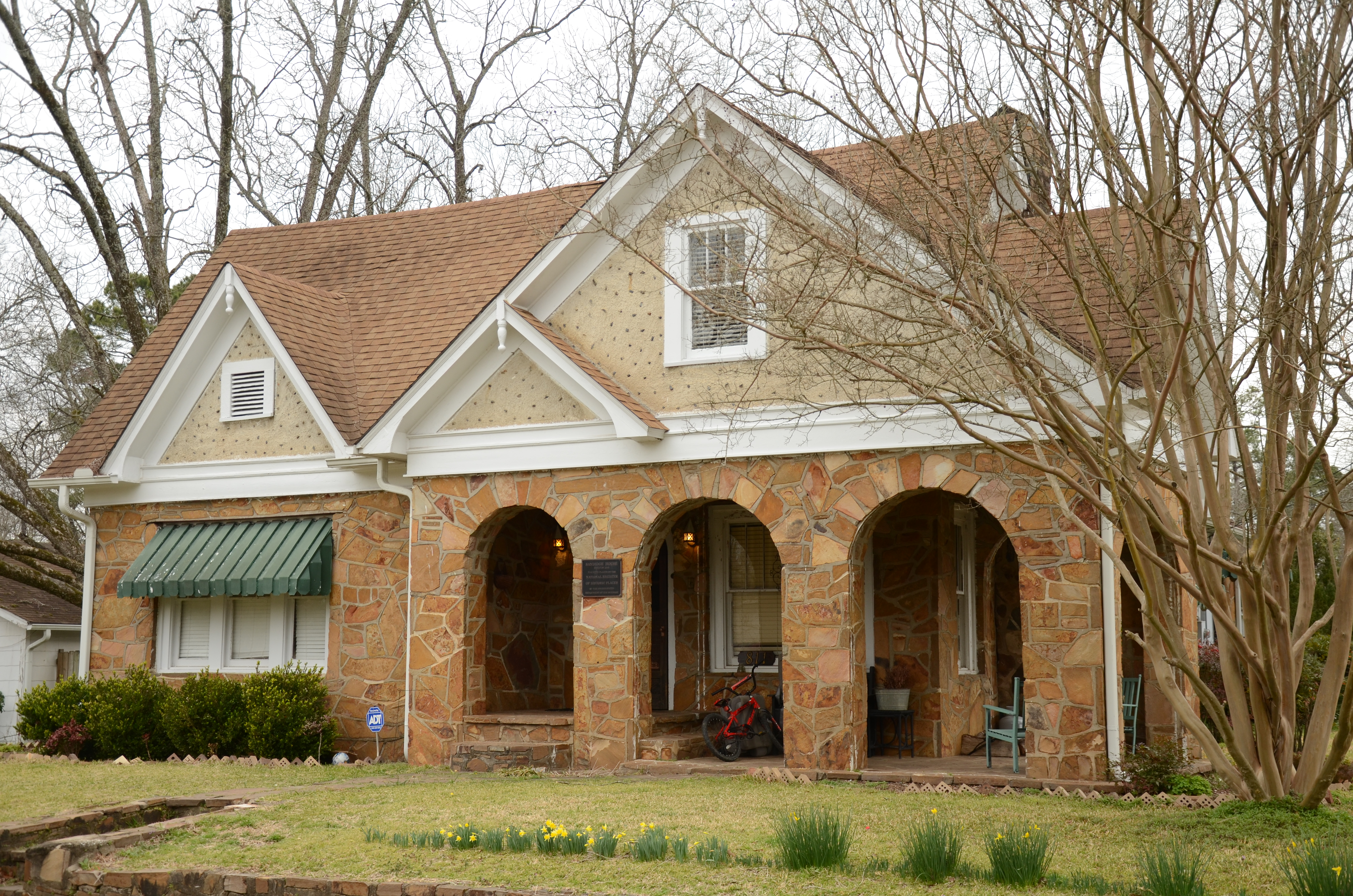

- Location within Arkansas Location within the United States
- Location: 811 Cherry St., Gurdon, Arkansas
- Coordinates: 33°55′21″N 93°8′41″W
- Area: 2 acres (0.81 ha)
- Built: 1935
- Built by: June Sandidge (supervision) with other craftspeople
- Architect: June Sandidge
- Architectural style: English Revival
- NRHP reference No.: 93000093
- Added to NRHP: February 25, 1993

The June Sandidge House is a historic house at 811 Cherry Street in Gurdon, Arkansas. It is a single-story wood-frame house with a brick veneer exterior, and represents an excellent and unusual local example of English Revival architecture. The house was built in 1938 by Mr. June Sandidge, an engineer for the Missouri Pacific Railroad. Its styling is essentially vernacular English Revival, although there are some Mediterranean influences, including Spanish-style arches on the porch.

The house was listed on the National Register of Historic Places in 1993.

== See also ==
- National Register of Historic Places listings in Clark County, Arkansas
