= Horace Estes House =

Historic house in Arkansas, United States

- U.S. National Register of Historic Places
- Location within Arkansas Location within the United States
- Location: 614 E. Main St., Gurdon, Arkansas
- Coordinates: 33°55′0″N 93°8′48″W
- Area: 1 acre (0.40 ha)
- Built: 1934
- Architect: Multiple
- Architectural style: Tudor Revival
- NRHP reference No.: 93000487
- Added to NRHP: September 21, 1993

The Horace Estes House is a historic house at 614 East Main Street in Gurdon, Arkansas. It is a single-story structure with a wood frame and brick veneer exterior. It was built in 1934, and is the city's best example of Tudor Revival architecture, featuring an irregular plan, multiple gables in the roofline, a tall ornamental chimney, and narrow windows.

The house was listed on the National Register of Historic Places in 1993.

== See also ==
- National Register of Historic Places listings in Clark County, Arkansas
