= Clear Springs Tabernacle =

Historic church in Arkansas, United States

- U.S. National Register of Historic Places
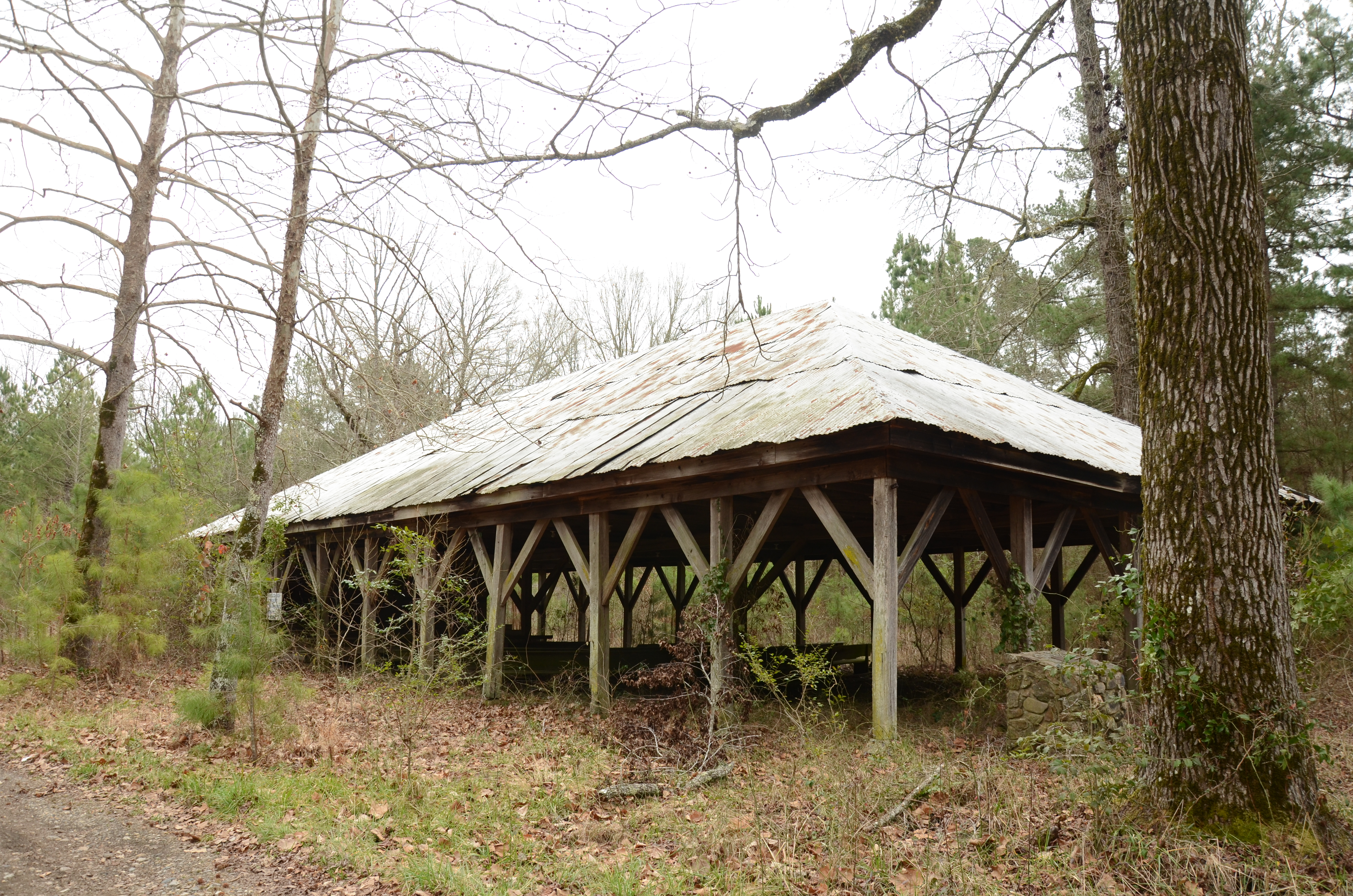

- Location within Arkansas Location within the United States
- Nearest city: Okolona, Arkansas
- Coordinates: 34°3′23″N 93°23′31″W
- Area: less than one acre
- Architect: Miles Kelly
- Architectural style: Plain tradition
- NRHP reference No.: 92000057
- Added to NRHP: February 13, 1992

The Clear Springs Tabernacle is a historic church revival building at the junction of Arkansas Highway 26 and Bobo Road, northeast of Antoine in rural Clark County, Arkansas. It is an open-air wood-frame structure with a metal roof, built in 1887 by the Christian Camp Ground Association. It is one of the few religious revival buildings of the period to survive in the state.

The building was listed on the National Register of Historic Places in 1992.

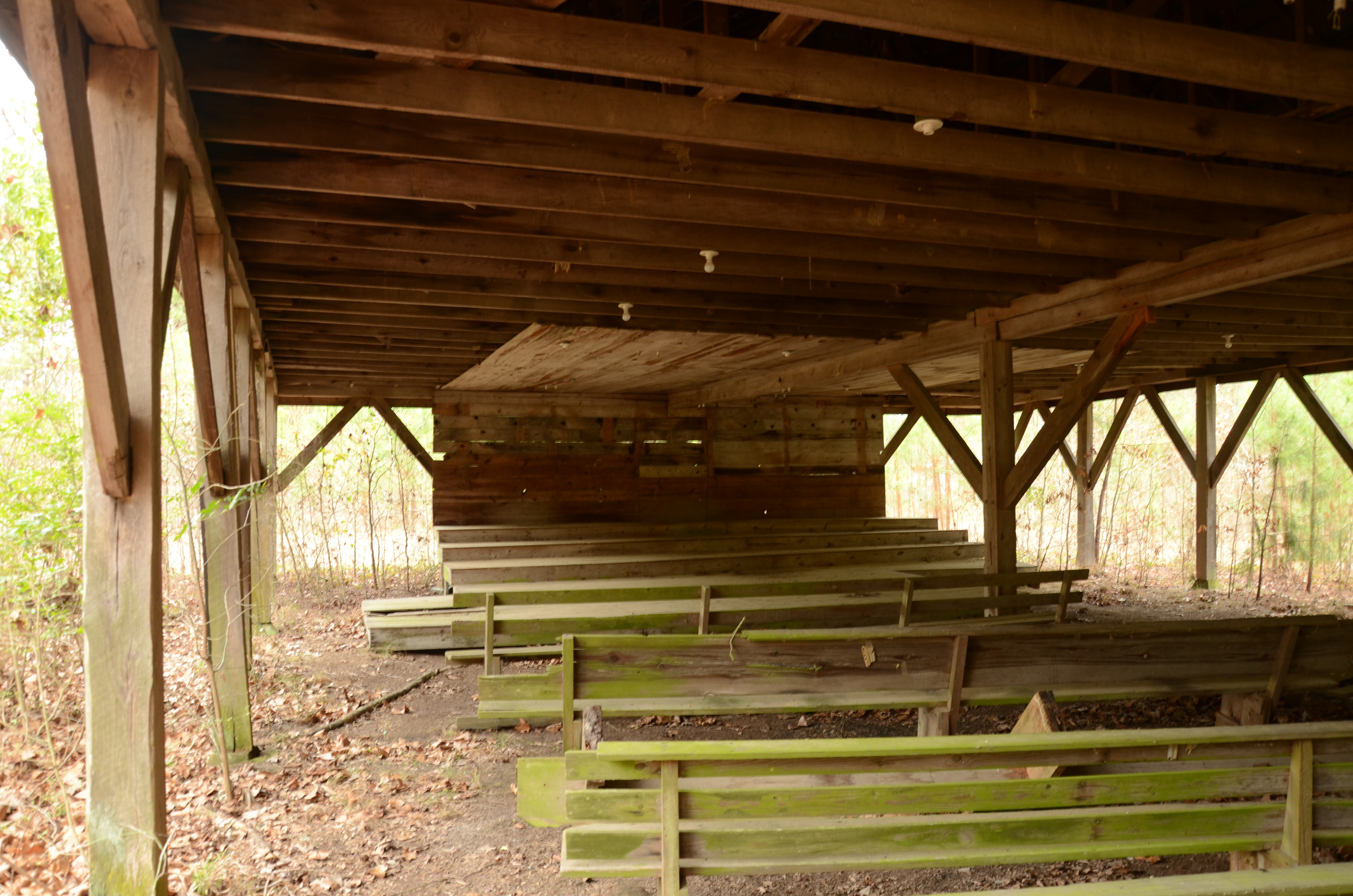
View from inside

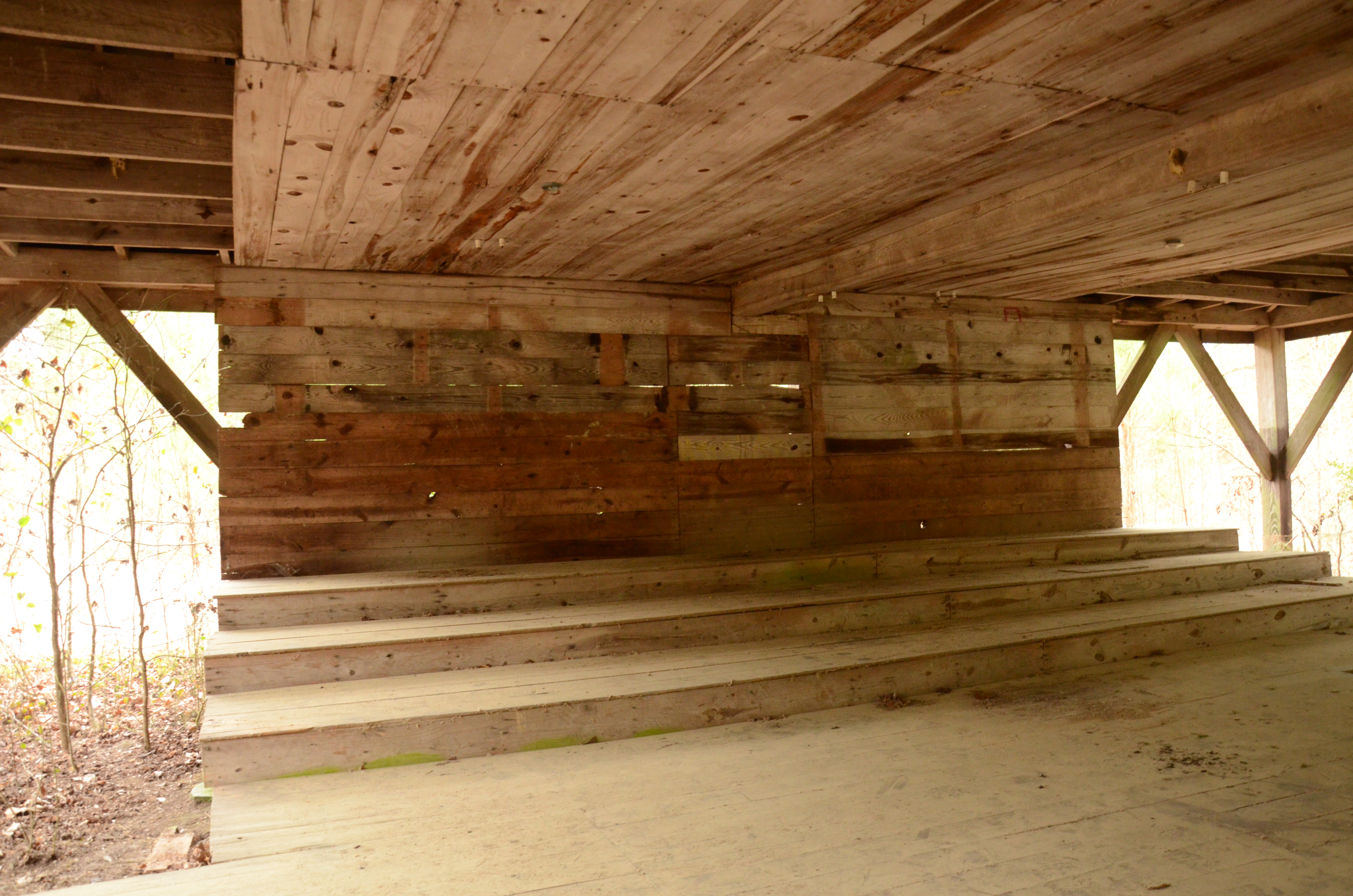
Stage

== See also ==
- National Register of Historic Places listings in Clark County, Arkansas
