= Gurdon Jail =

- U.S. National Register of Historic Places
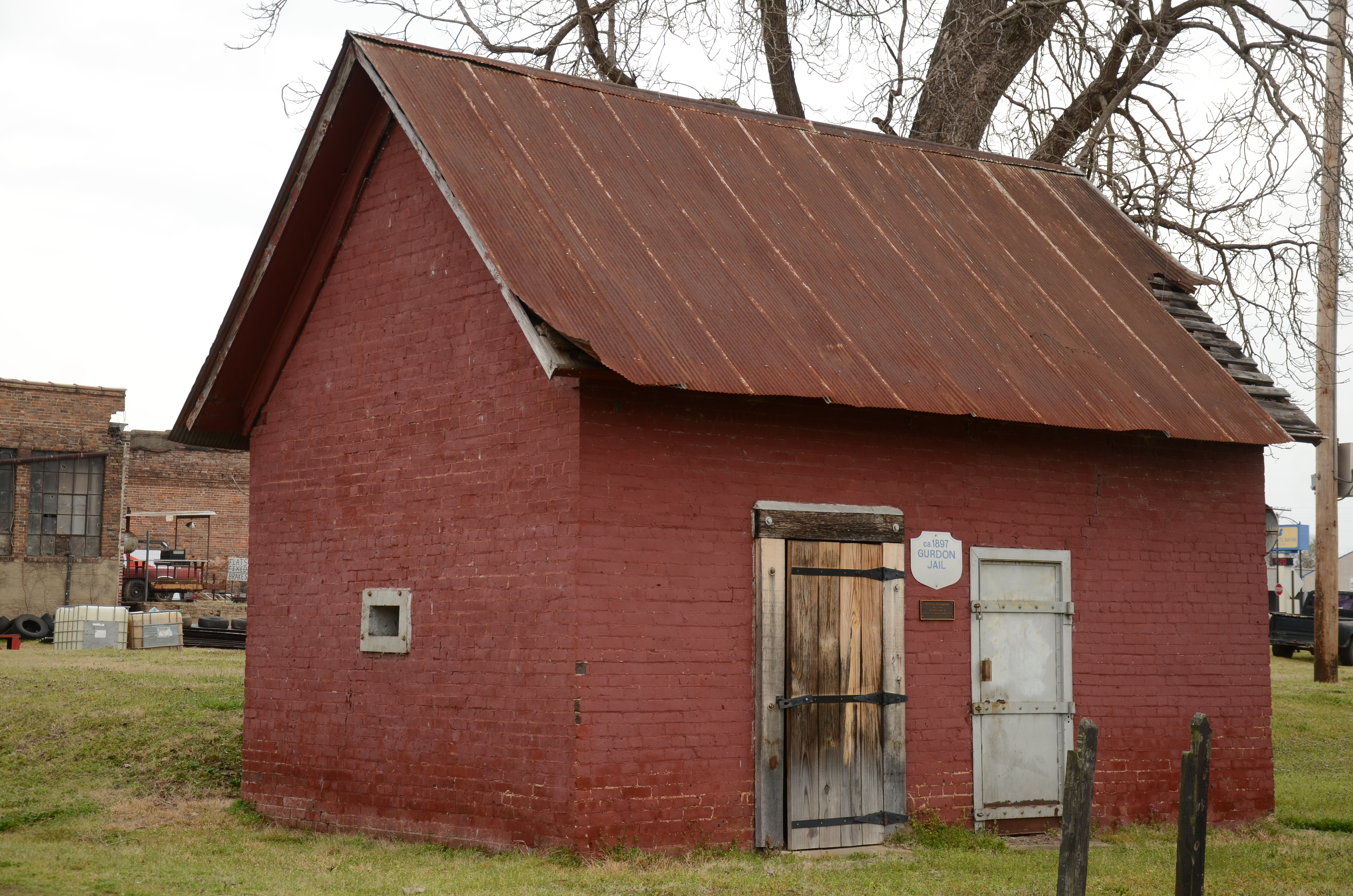

- Location within Arkansas Location within the United States
- Location: W. Joslyn and Front Sts., Gurdon, Arkansas
- Coordinates: 33°55′11″N 93°9′14″W
- Area: less than one acre
- Built: 1907
- Built by: M.D. Lowe
- NRHP reference No.: 89001959
- Added to NRHP: November 13, 1989

The Gurdon Jail is a historic city jail at West Joslyn and Front Streets in Gurdon, Arkansas. The single-story brick building, which contains two cells, was built in 1907 by the co-owner of the local brick company, M.D. Lowe. It is the only such structure in the city, and is one of a few surviving buildings from Gurdon's boom time as a lumber town in the early 20th century.

The building was listed on the National Register of Historic Places in 1989.

== See also ==
- National Register of Historic Places listings in Clark County, Arkansas
