= C. E. Thompson General Store and House =

- C.E. Thompson General Store and House
- U.S. National Register of Historic Places
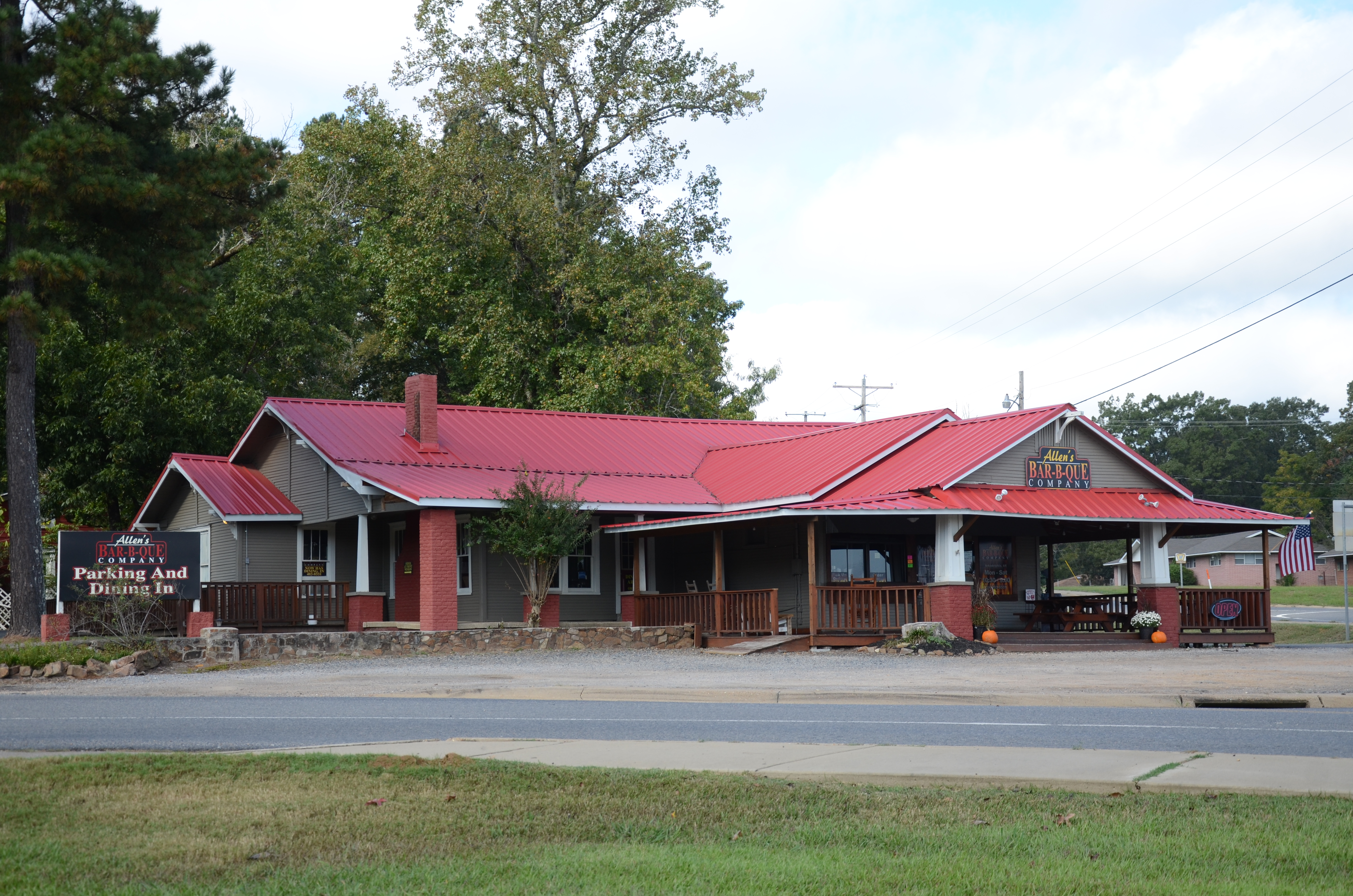

- Location within Arkansas Location within the United States
- Location: 3100 Hollywood, Arkadelphia, Arkansas
- Coordinates: 34°7′3″N 93°5′49″W
- Area: 3.9 acres (1.6 ha)
- Built: 1936
- Architectural style: Bungalow/craftsman
- MPS: Arkansas Highway History and Architecture MPS
- NRHP reference No.: 01000302
- Added to NRHP: April 4, 2001

The C. E. Thompson General Store and House is a historic property at 3100 Hollywood Road (at the junction of Highways 26 and 8) in Arkadelphia, Arkansas. Its principal structure is a single-story wood-frame with a gable roof, which was built in 1936 and served as a residence for the Thompson family and as a general store until it closed in the 1980s. It is the only Craftsman-style general store building in Arkadelphia. The building currently houses Allen's Barbeque, a local barbeque restaurant. The property includes other historically significant buildings, including a garage, wellhouse, privy, shed, smokehouse, and barn.

The property was listed on the National Register of Historic Places in 2001.

== See also ==
- National Register of Historic Places listings in Clark County, Arkansas
