= Dr. Boaz House =

Historic house in Arkansas, United States

- U.S. National Register of Historic Places
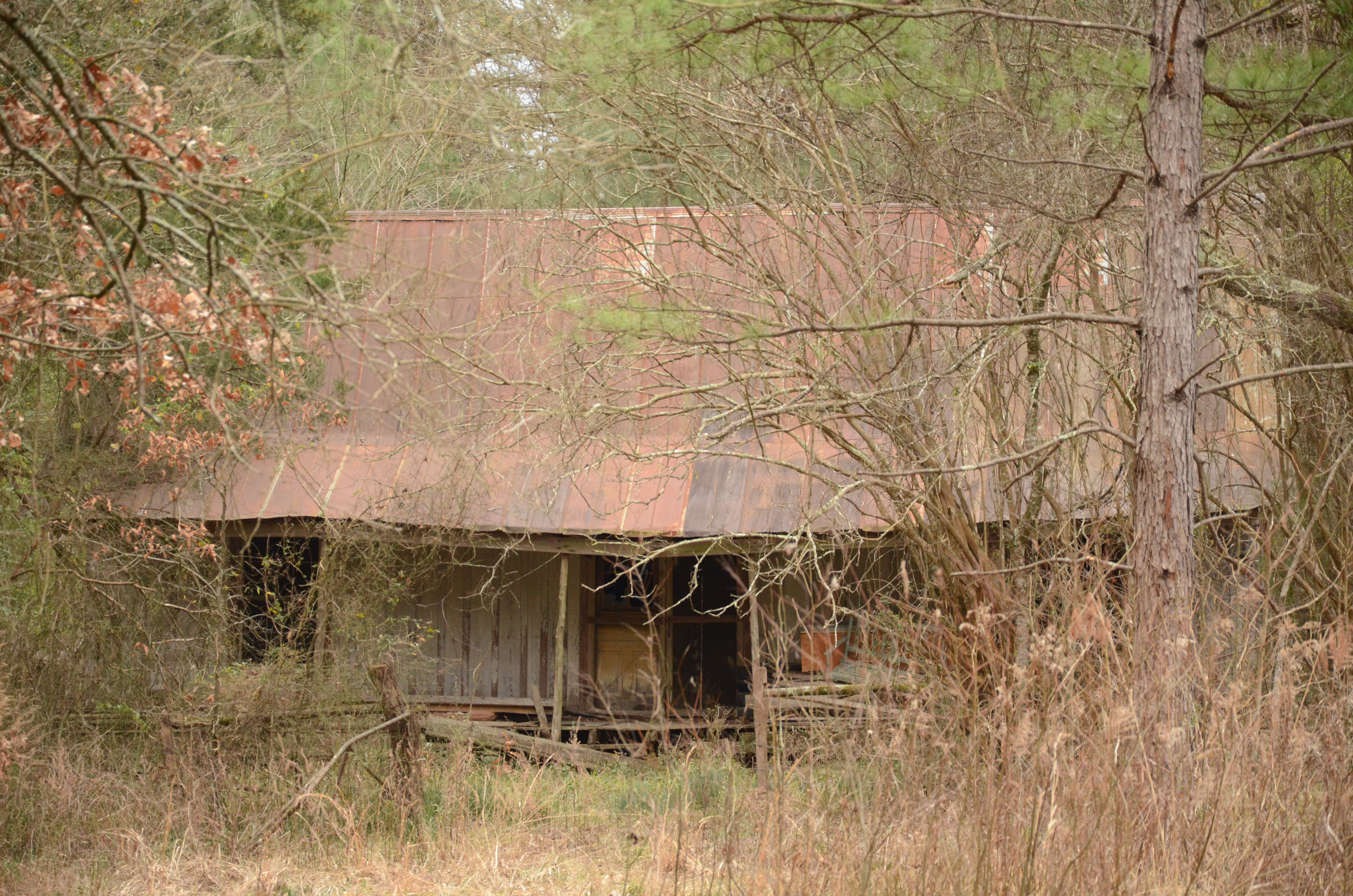

- Location within Arkansas Location within the United States
- Nearest city: Clear Spring, Arkansas
- Coordinates: 34°4′23″N 93°22′19″W
- Area: 3 acres (1.2 ha)
- Built by: Samuel Peeples
- Architectural style: Dog trot
- NRHP reference No.: 91002014
- Added to NRHP: January 28, 1992

The Dr. Boaz House is a historic house in rural western Clark County, Arkansas. It is located on the south side of Arkansas Highway 26, just west of its junction with County Road 291, near the hamlet of Clear Spring. The dog trot house was probably built c. 1891 by Samuel Peeples (whose family cemetery lies nearby) as a wedding present for his daughter Annie and Doctor A. Boaz. The house is entirely vernacular in style, and is sheathed primarily in board-and-batten siding. The northern (front) facade has a porch extending its full width, with a chimney on the exterior of the western wall. A kitchen ell extends to the rear (southward) of the western portion of the main block. The house is the finest known instance of the vernacular dog trot form in Clark County.

The house was listed on the National Register of Historic Places in 1992.

== See also ==
- National Register of Historic Places listings in Clark County, Arkansas
