= McNeely Creek Bridge =

- Formerly listed on the U.S. National Register of Historic Places
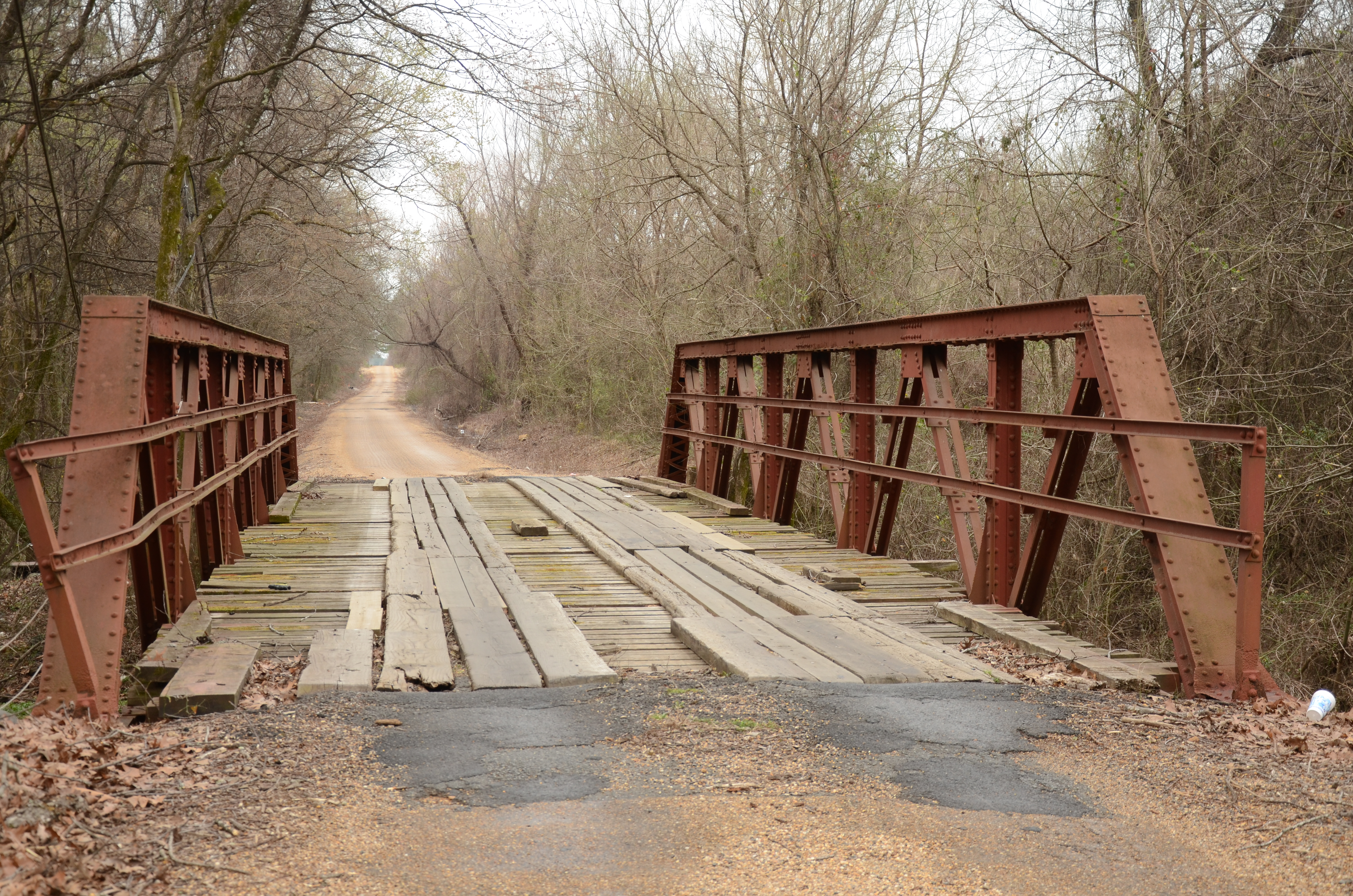

- Location within Arkansas Location within the United States
- Location: County Rd. 12, Beirne, Arkansas
- Coordinates: 33.88706°N 93.20958°W
- Area: less than one acre
- Built: 1923
- Architectural style: Warren pony-truss
- MPS: Historic Bridges of Arkansas MPS
- NRHP reference No.: 04000495

Significant dates
- Added to NRHP: May 26, 2004
- Removed from NRHP: September 1, 2022

The McNeely Creek Bridge is a historic bridge spanning McNeely Creek just outside Beirne, Arkansas, a village in southwestern Clark County. The bridge, a steel Warren pony truss bridge with a span of 71 feet (22 m), carries County Route 12. Built in 1923, it has a wooden deck 18 feet (5.5 m) wide.

The bridge was listed on the National Register of Historic Places in 2004. It was delisted in 2022.

== See also ==
- National Register of Historic Places listings in Clark County, Arkansas
- List of bridges on the National Register of Historic Places in Arkansas
