= W. H. Young House =

Historic house in Arkansas, United States

- W.H. Young House
- U.S. National Register of Historic Places
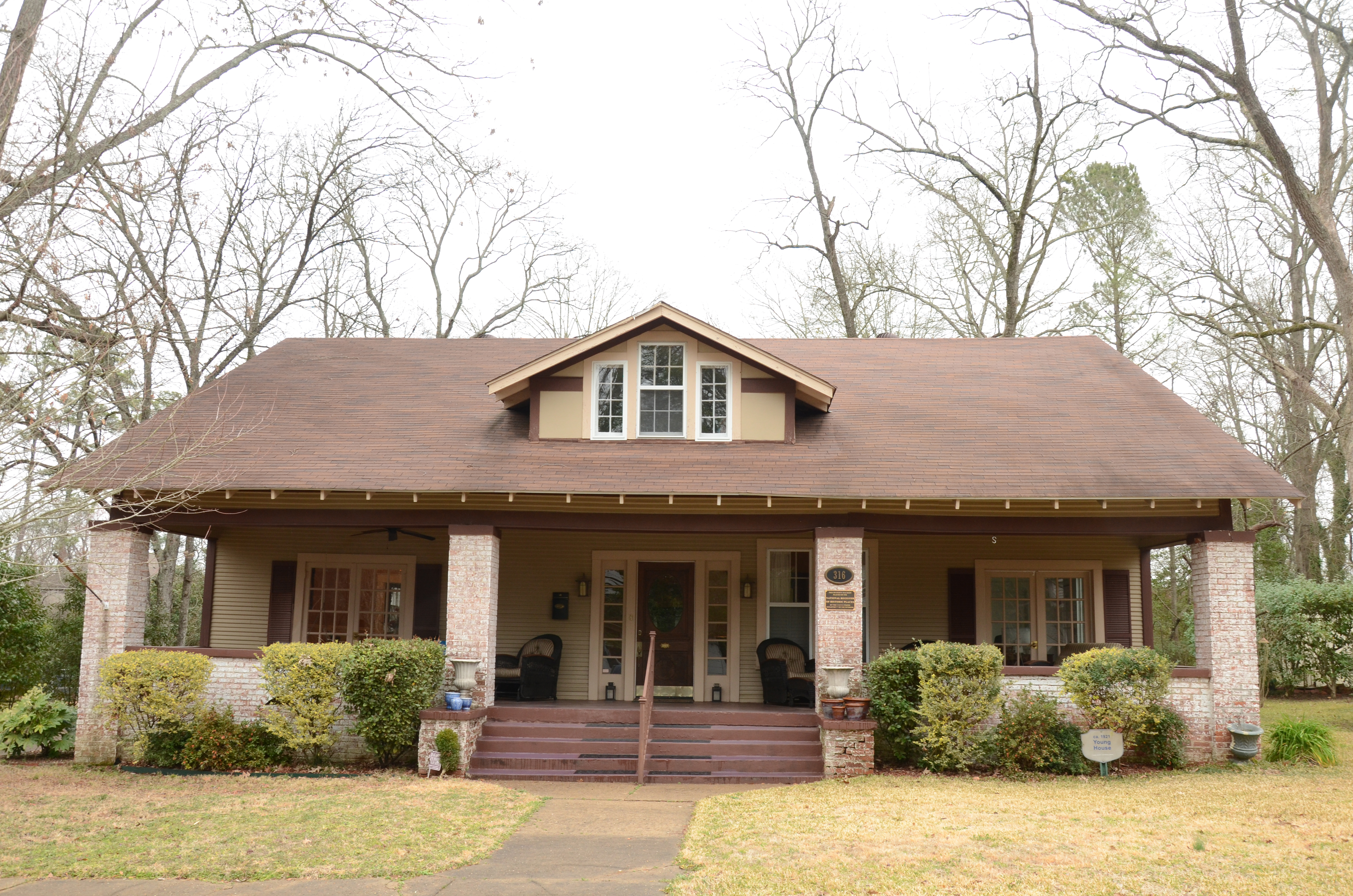

- Location within Arkansas Location within the United States
- Location: 316 Meador Ln., Arkadelphia, Arkansas
- Coordinates: 34°7′32″N 93°2′21″W
- Area: less than one acre
- Built: 1921
- Architectural style: American Craftsman
- NRHP reference No.: 06000842
- Added to NRHP: September 20, 2006

The W. H. Young House is a historic house at 316 Meador Lane in Arkadelphia, Arkansas. The two story wood-frame house was built in 1921 for the William Hatley Young family, and is a high-quality locally rare example of the American Craftsman style of architecture. It exhibits the classical elements of this style, including exposed rafter ends, a deep porch with knee bracing, and a large second-story dormer.

The house was listed on the National Register of Historic Places in 2006.

== See also ==
- National Register of Historic Places listings in Clark County, Arkansas
