= Clark County Library =

- U.S. National Register of Historic Places
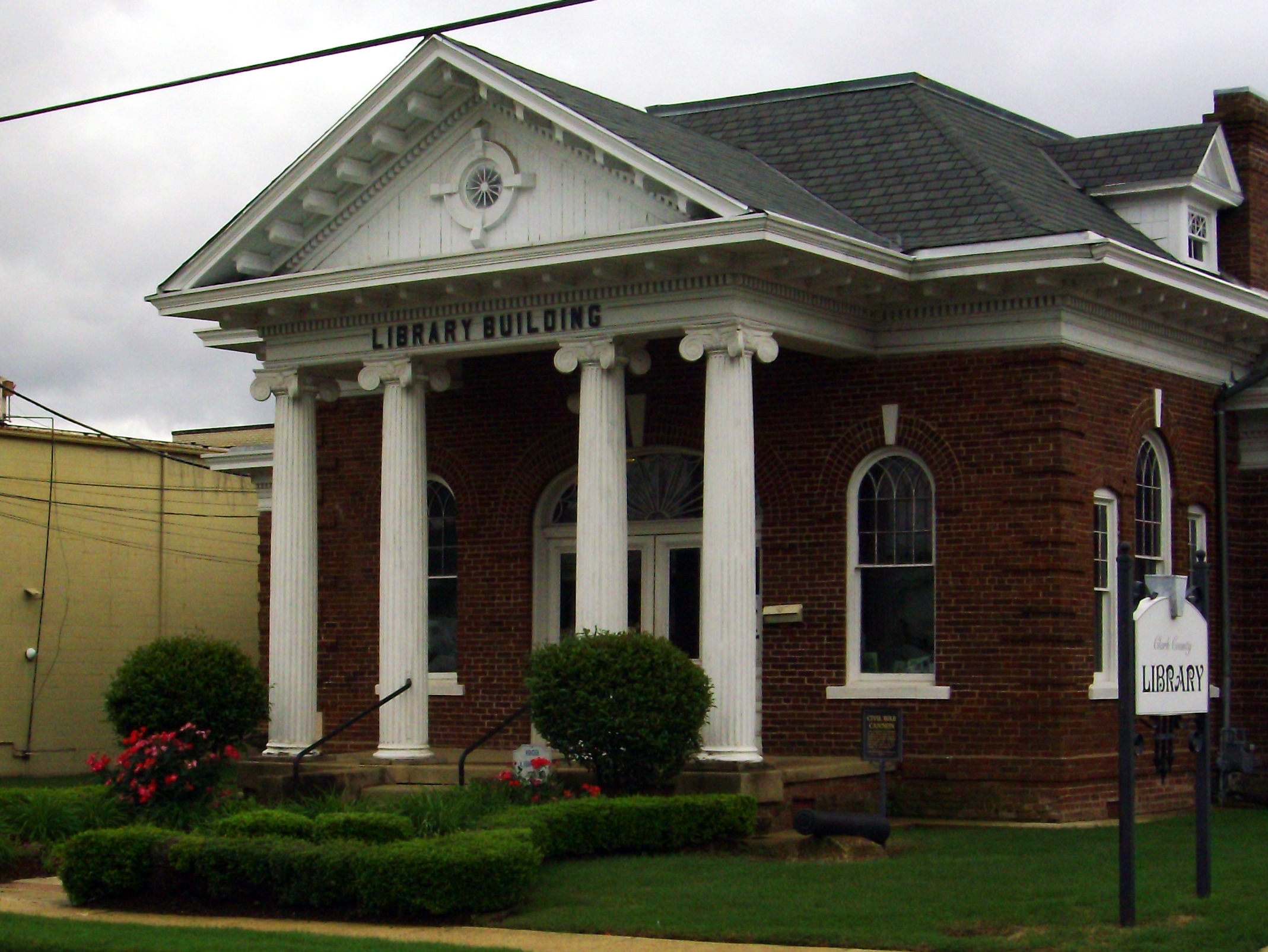

- Location within Arkansas Location within the United States
- Location: 609 Caddo St., Arkadelphia, Arkansas
- Coordinates: 34°7′14″N 93°3′15″W
- Area: less than one acre
- Built: 1903
- Built by: James Pullen
- Architect: Charles L. Thompson
- NRHP reference No.: 74000469
- Added to NRHP: November 5, 1974

The Clark County Library is located at 609 Caddo St. in Arkadelphia, Arkansas. It is located in a Classical Revival single-story brick building designed by Charles L. Thompson, a noted Little Rock architect, and built in 1903. It is one of the oldest institutional library buildings in Arkansas. It was built by the local Women's Library Association, and transferred to county control in 1974.

The building was listed on the U.S. National Register of Historic Places in 1974.

== See also ==
- National Register of Historic Places listings in Clark County, Arkansas
