= Nannie Gresham Biscoe House =

Historic house in Arkansas, United States

- U.S. National Register of Historic Places
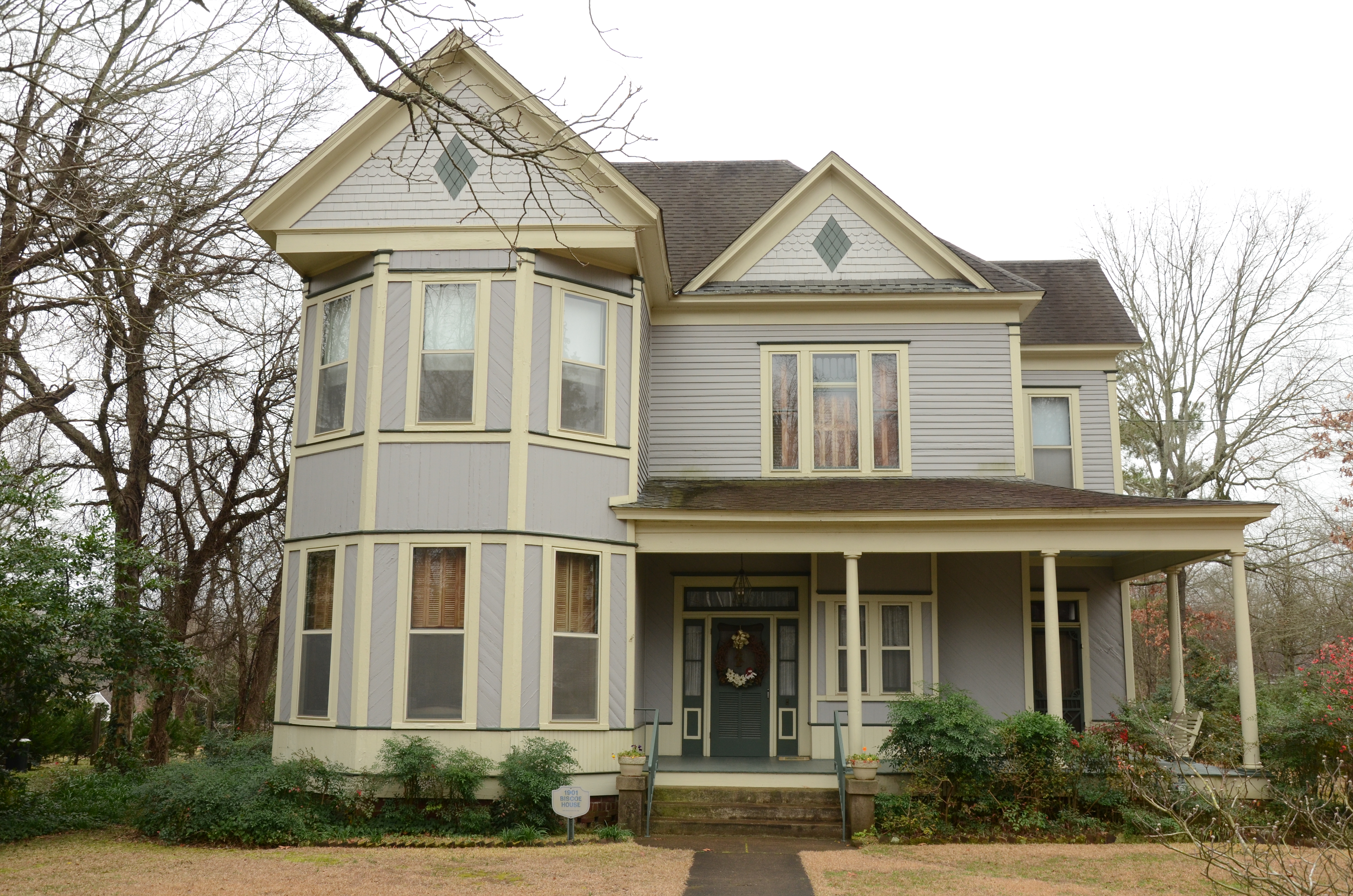

- Location within Arkansas Location within the United States
- Location: 227 Cherry Street, Arkadelphia, Arkansas
- Coordinates: 34°7′22″N 93°2′57″W
- Area: less than one acre
- Built: 1901
- Architectural style: Queen Anne
- NRHP reference No.: 03001450
- Added to NRHP: January 21, 2004

The Nannie Gresham Biscoe House is a historic house located at 227 Cherry Street in Arkadelphia, Arkansas.

== Description and history ==
Built in 1901, the two-story wood-framed house is a fine local example of Queen Anne styling, which has been passed from mother to daughter within the same family. The house was built by the widowed Nannie Gresham Biscoe as a family home and boarding house, offering residential spaces to students attending the nearby Ouachita Baptist College, where she also taught. The house is the least-altered of several period houses on the street.

The house was listed on the National Register of Historic Places on January 21, 2004.

== See also ==
- National Register of Historic Places listings in Clark County, Arkansas
