= Old Bank of Amity =

- U.S. National Register of Historic Places
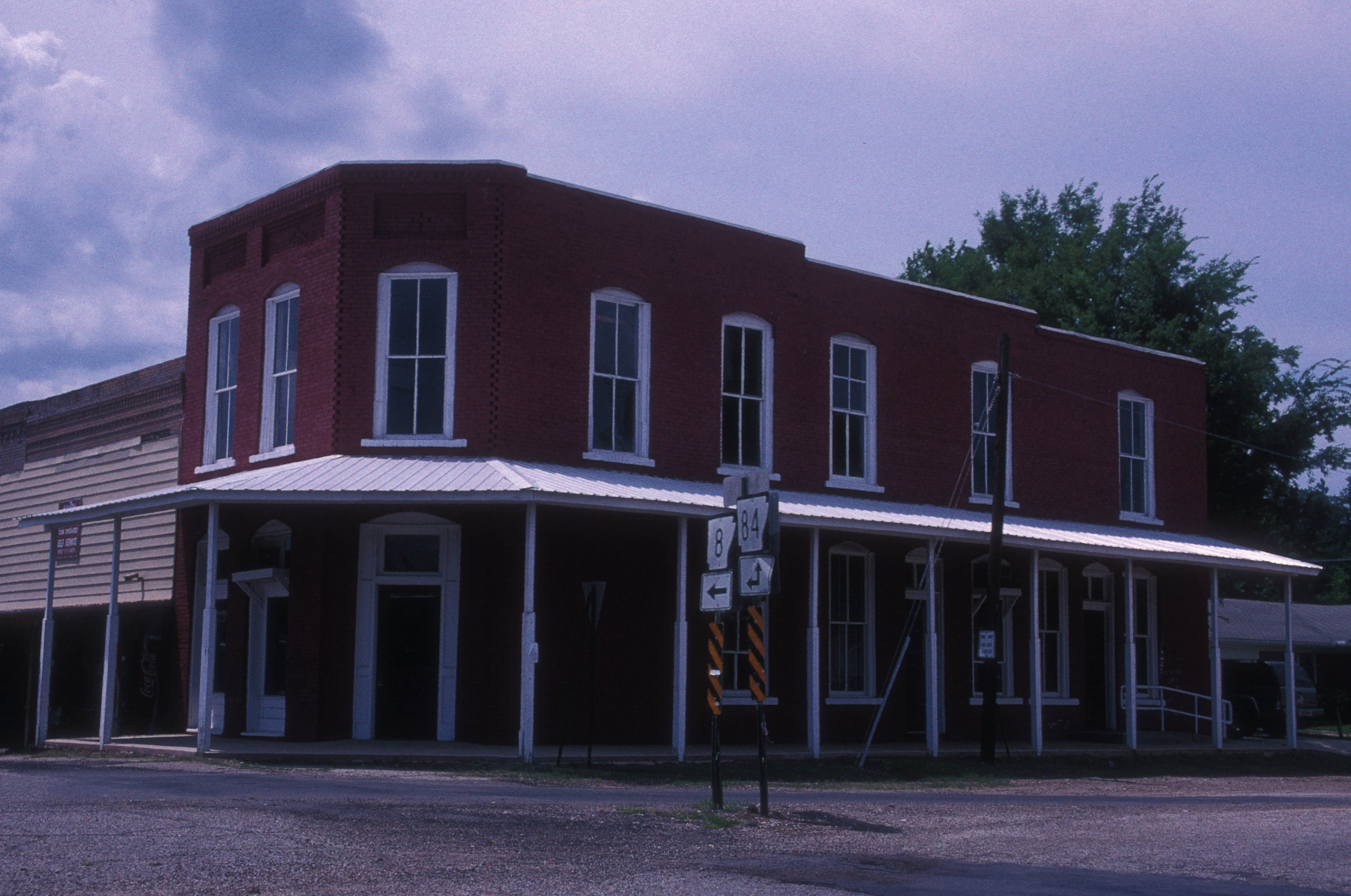

- Location within Arkansas Location within the United States
- Location: NW corner of town square, Amity, Arkansas
- Coordinates: 34°15′55″N 93°27′40″W
- Area: less than one acre
- Architectural style: Italianate, Vernacular Italianate
- NRHP reference No.: 91000690
- Added to NRHP: June 5, 1991

The Old Bank of Amity is a historic commercial building at the northwest corner of the town square in Amity, Arkansas. It is a two-story red brick building with modest Italianate styling. It was built in 1906–07 and is the most prominent building of the period in the community. The Bank of Amity was chartered in 1905 and operated in this building until 1976, when it moved to new premises.

The building was listed on the National Register of Historic Places in 1991.

== See also ==
- National Register of Historic Places listings in Clark County, Arkansas
