= Bozeman House =

Historic house in Arkansas, United States

- U.S. National Register of Historic Places
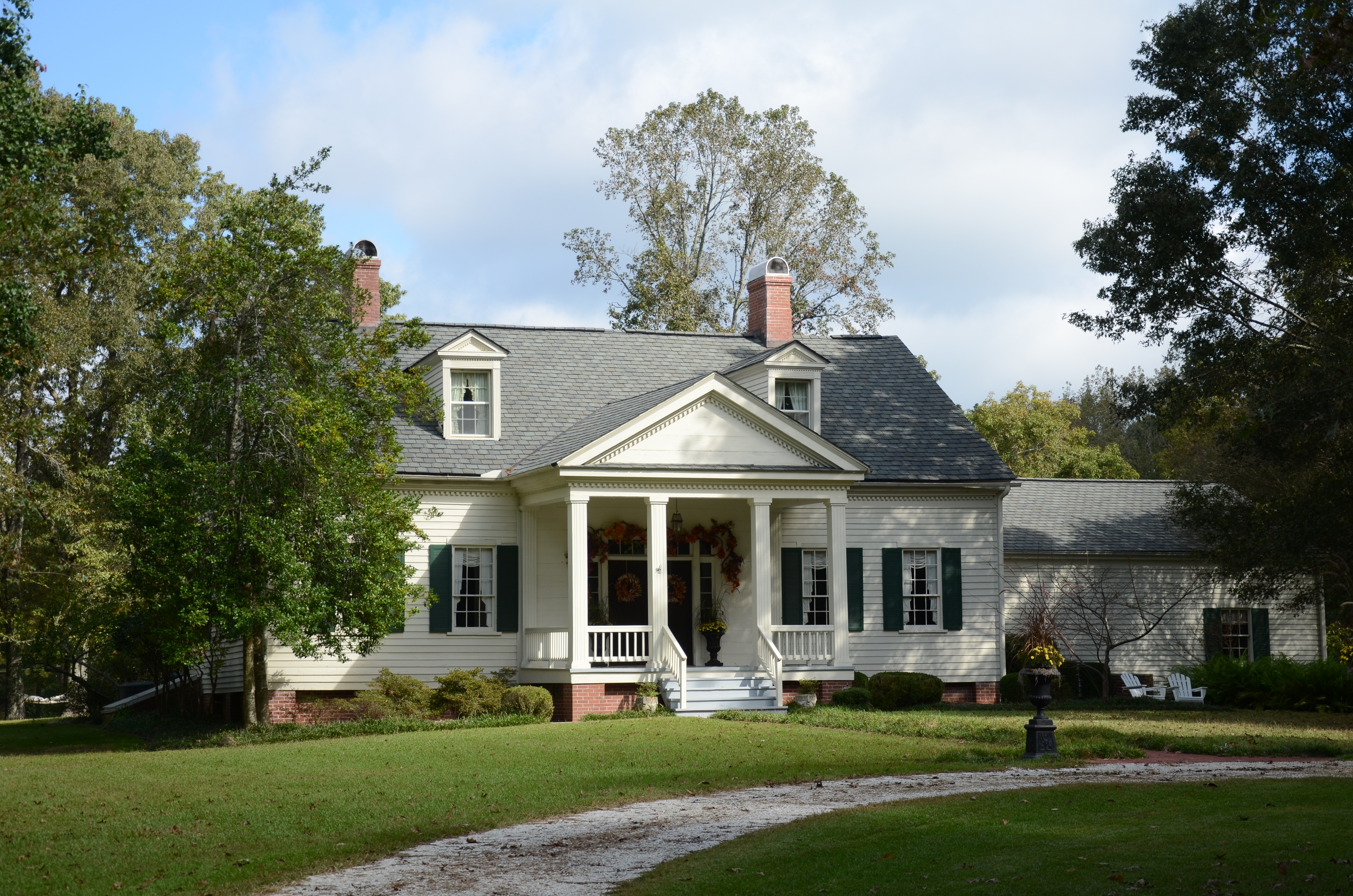

- Location within Arkansas Location within the United States
- Nearest city: Arkadelphia, Arkansas
- Coordinates: 34°5′44″N 93°9′3″W
- Area: less than one acre
- Built: 1847
- Built by: Bozeman, Michael
- Architectural style: Greek Revival
- NRHP reference No.: 78000576
- Added to NRHP: November 14, 1978

The Bozeman House is a historic house in rural Clark County, Arkansas. It is located on the north side of Arkansas Highway 26, several miles west of Arkadelphia, the county seat. It is a 1 1/2-story wood-frame house with Greek Revival styling. The house was built c. 1847 by Michael Bozeman, one of the county's early settlers, and is one of the oldest structures standing in the county. The main block is five bays wide, with a pedimented portico above the entrance on the southern facade. A kitchen ell extends to the rear of the house from the northwestern corner, giving the house an L-shape. The roof the main facade is pierced by a pair of gabled dormers. The trim detailing includes entablatures and dentil moulding.

The house was listed on the National Register of Historic Places in 1978.

== See also ==
- National Register of Historic Places listings in Clark County, Arkansas
