= James E. M. Barkman House =

Historic house in Arkansas, United States

- U.S. National Register of Historic Places
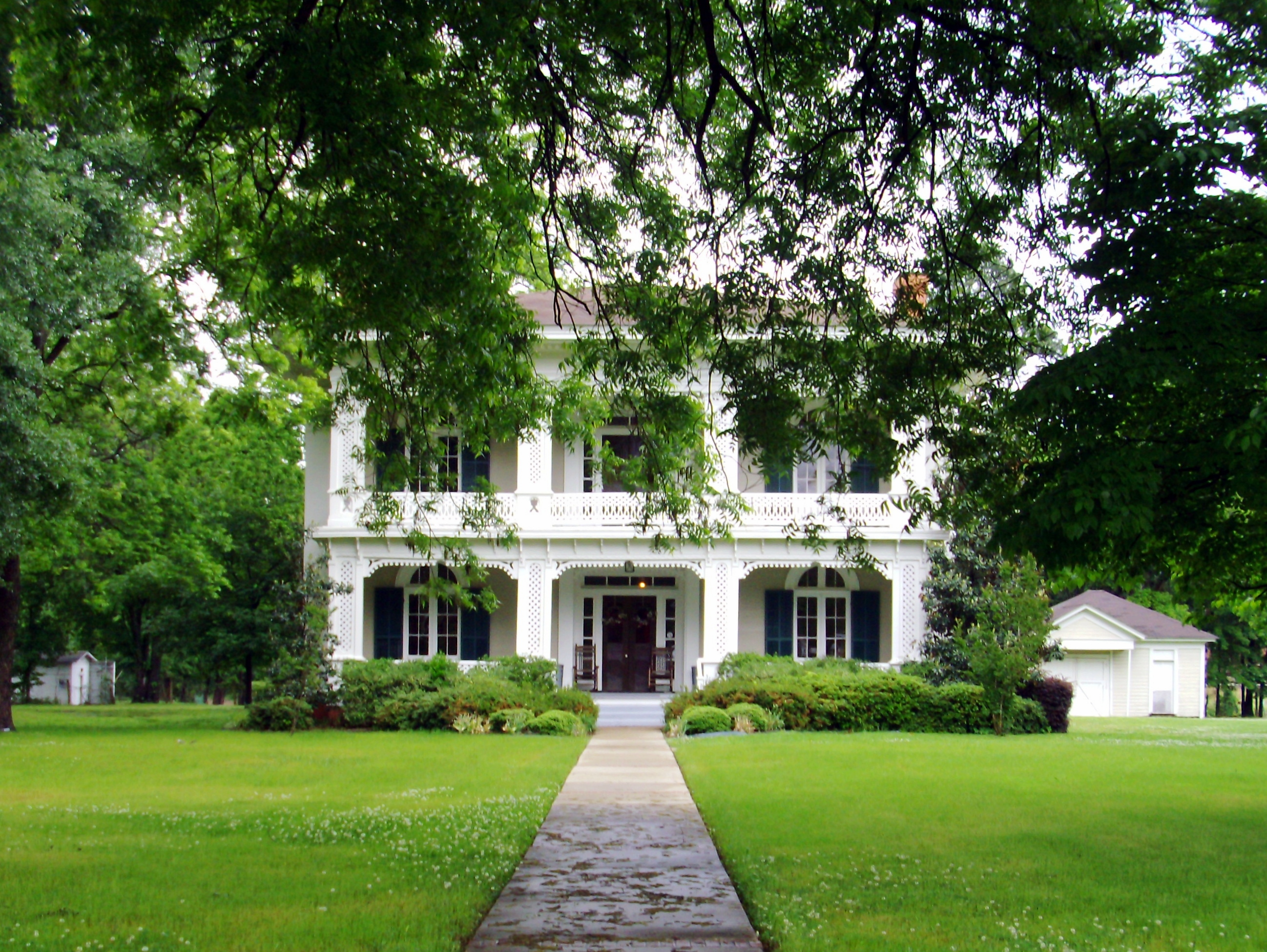

- Location within Arkansas Location within the United States
- Location: 406 N. 10th Street, Arkadelphia, Arkansas
- Coordinates: 34°7′31″N 93°3′23″W
- Area: less than one acre
- Built: 1860
- Architectural style: Greek Revival, Gothic Revival
- NRHP reference No.: 74000467
- Added to NRHP: July 30, 1974

The James E. M. Barkman House is a historic house located at 406 North 10th Street in Arkadelphia, Arkansas.

== Description and history ==
The two-story, timber-framed, hipped-roof house was built around 1860 for James E. M. Barkman, son of one of Arkadelphia's early settlers. It is unusual in the state for its combination of Greek Revival and Gothic Revival features. The main block has wide Doric pilasters at the corners, and its first floor windows have semi-circular heads. A full two-story porch extends across the main facade, with a wealth of jigsaw-cut Gothic detail. The house's interior follows a typical antebellum central-hall plan.

The house was listed on the National Register of Historic Places on July 30, 1974.

== See also ==
- National Register of Historic Places listings in Clark County, Arkansas
