= Arkadelphia Boy Scout Hut =

- U.S. National Register of Historic Places
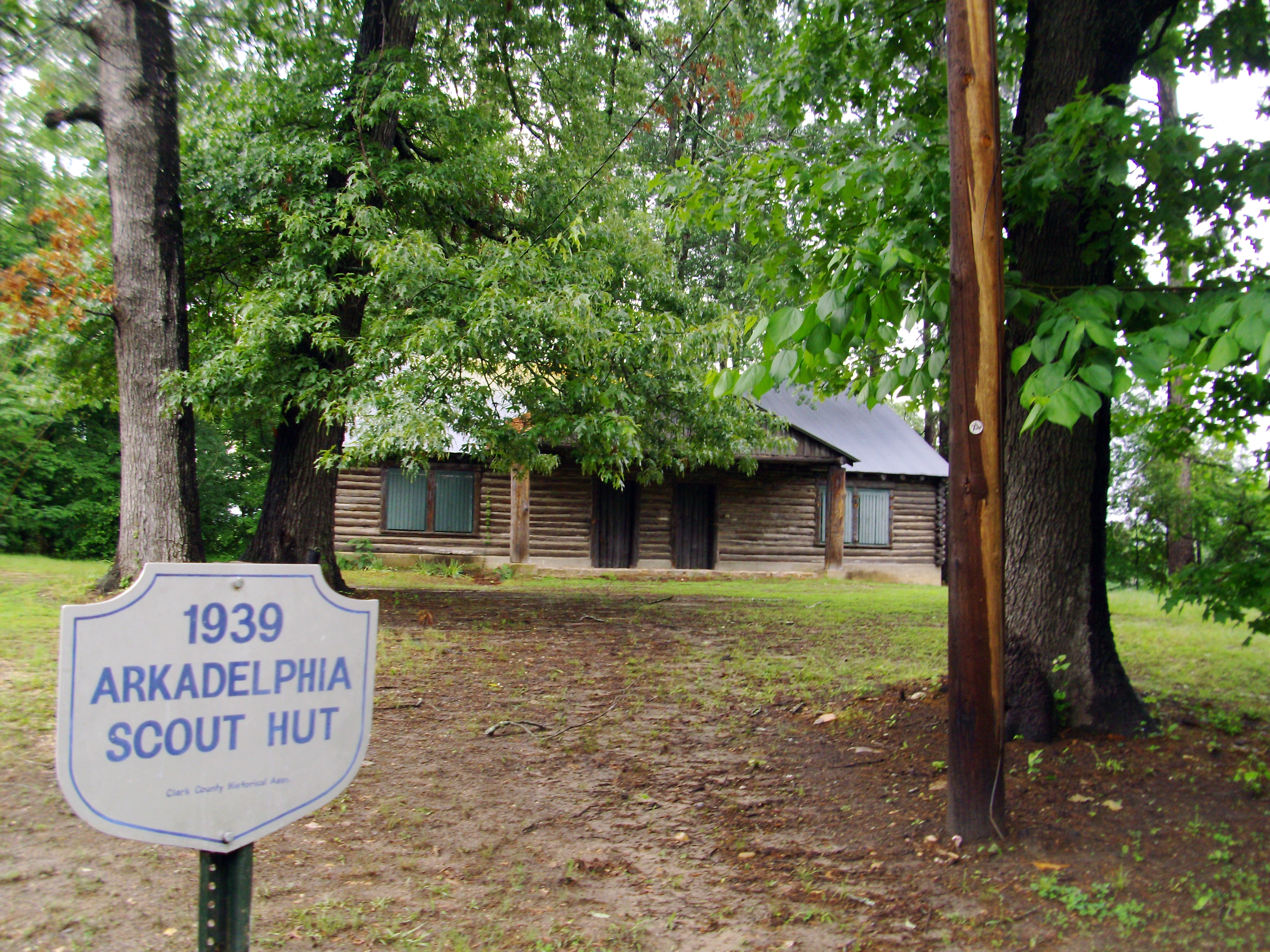

- Location within Arkansas Location within the United States
- Location: 8th St., Arkadelphia, Arkansas
- Coordinates: 34°7′45″N 93°3′16″W
- Area: less than one acre
- Built: 1939
- Built by: A.F. Bishop
- Architect: National Youth Administration
- Architectural style: Late 19th And Early 20th Century American Movements, Rustic
- NRHP reference No.: 01001526
- Added to NRHP: January 28, 2002

The Arkadelphia Boy Scout Hut, located in Central Park in Arkadelphia, Arkansas, United States, is on the National Register of Historic Places. Since the roof and the original shutters and windows were replaced in 1953, in the Hut is precluded from being listed on the National Register under Criterion C. However, it listed under Criterion A as a "property that made a contribution to the major pattern of American history".

The Boy Scout Hut was constructed from 1938 to 1939 as a National Youth Administration (NYA) project. It is an example of the typical type of buildings constructed by the New Deal's Works Progress Administration (WPA), Civilian Conservation Corps (CCC) and NYA during the Great Depression. However, it is the only known building constructed by the NYA and the only building designed in a Rustic style that remains standing in Arkadelphia that was designed and constructed during the New Deal era.

While the Boy Scout Hut was constructed specifically as a meeting place for two local Boy Scout troops, and its use is controlled by the Boy Scouts, the building is actually owned by the city of Arkadelphia. Starting around 1958, the Boy Scouts allowed the local Girl Scout troops to use the building and currently Cub Scout Pack 3024 and Girl Scout Troop 454 use the building.

== See also ==
- Scout hall
