= Peake High School =

- U.S. National Register of Historic Places
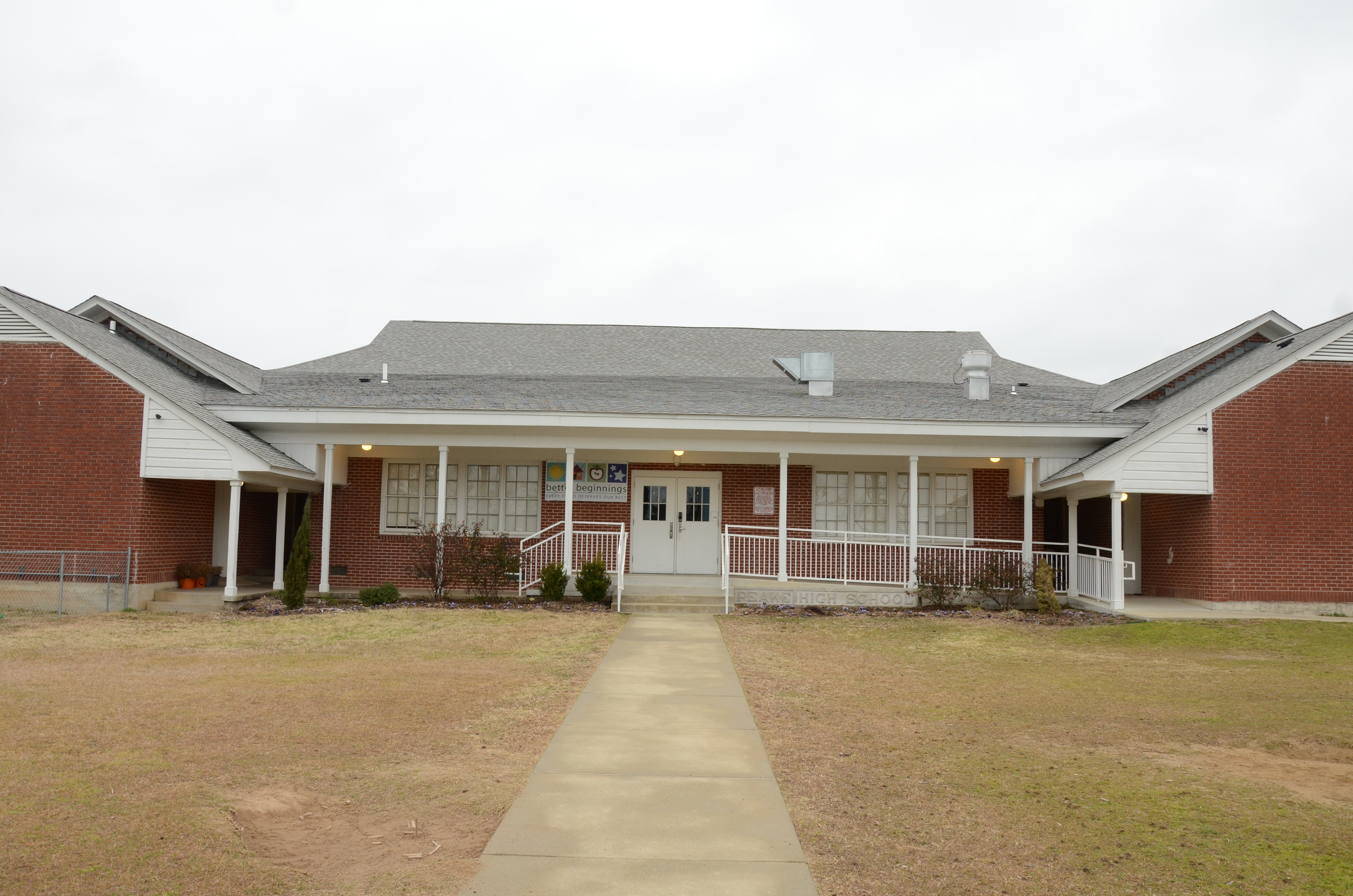

- Location within Arkansas Location within the United States
- Location: 1600 Caddo St., Arkadelphia, Arkansas
- Coordinates: 34°7′17″N 93°4′3″W
- Area: less than one acre
- Built: 1928
- Architectural style: Bungalow/craftsman
- NRHP reference No.: 04001499
- Added to NRHP: January 19, 2005

The Peake High School is a historic school building at 1600 Caddo Street in Arkadelphia, Arkansas. This H-shaped single-story brick building was built in 1929 with assistance from the Rosenwald Fund on land given by J. Ed Peake, a school principal for whom the school was named. The building was used as a high school for African Americans until 1960, when a new building was constructed adjacent to this one, which was converted to an elementary school. The city's public schools were integrated in 1969. The school housed the city's Head Start Program from 1984 to 2001. It is the only surviving Rosenwald school in the county.

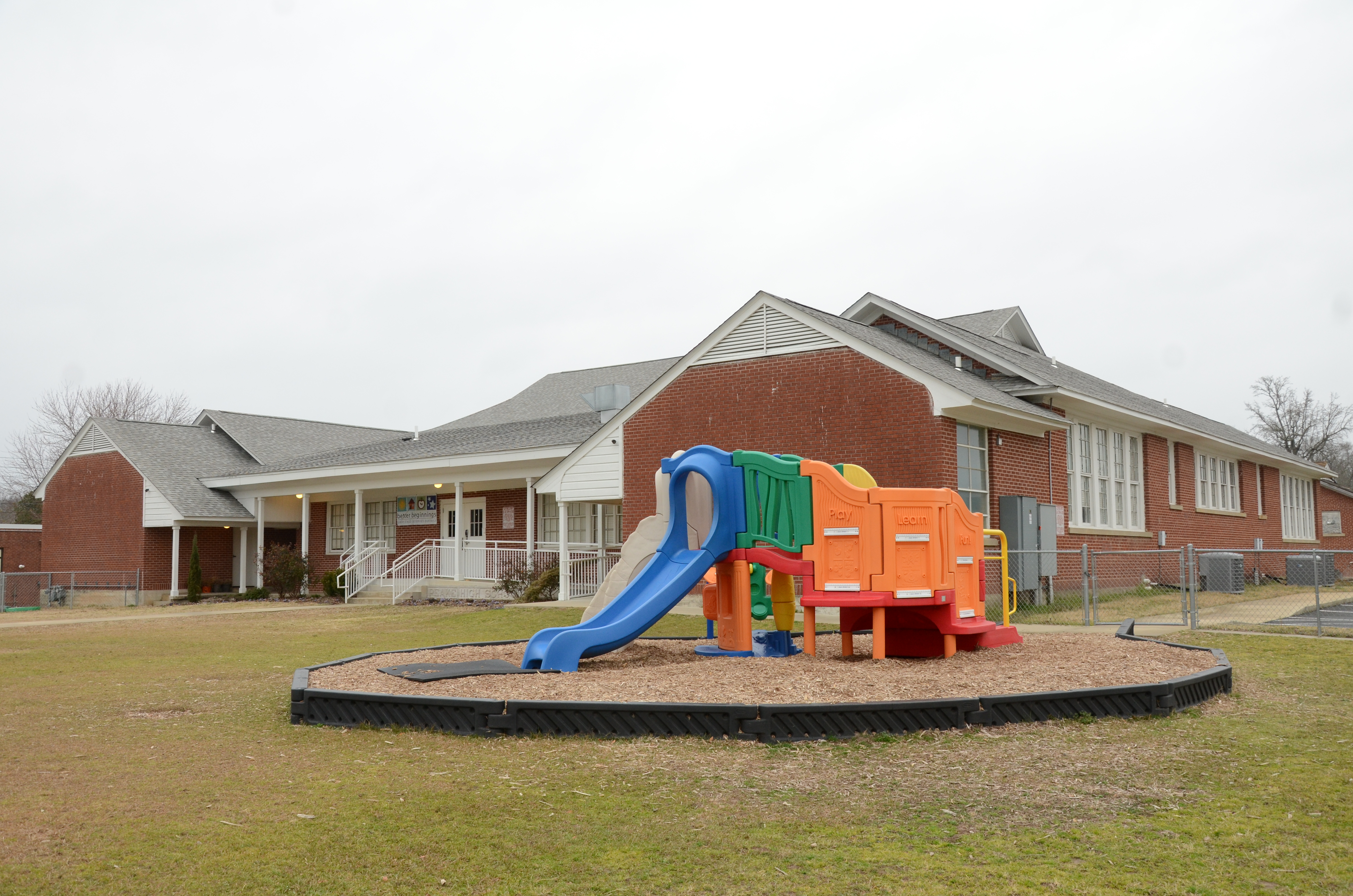
Another view, showing the side of the building

The building was listed on the National Register of Historic Places in 2005.

== See also ==
- National Register of Historic Places listings in Clark County, Arkansas
