= Clark County Courthouse (Arkansas) =

- U.S. National Register of Historic Places
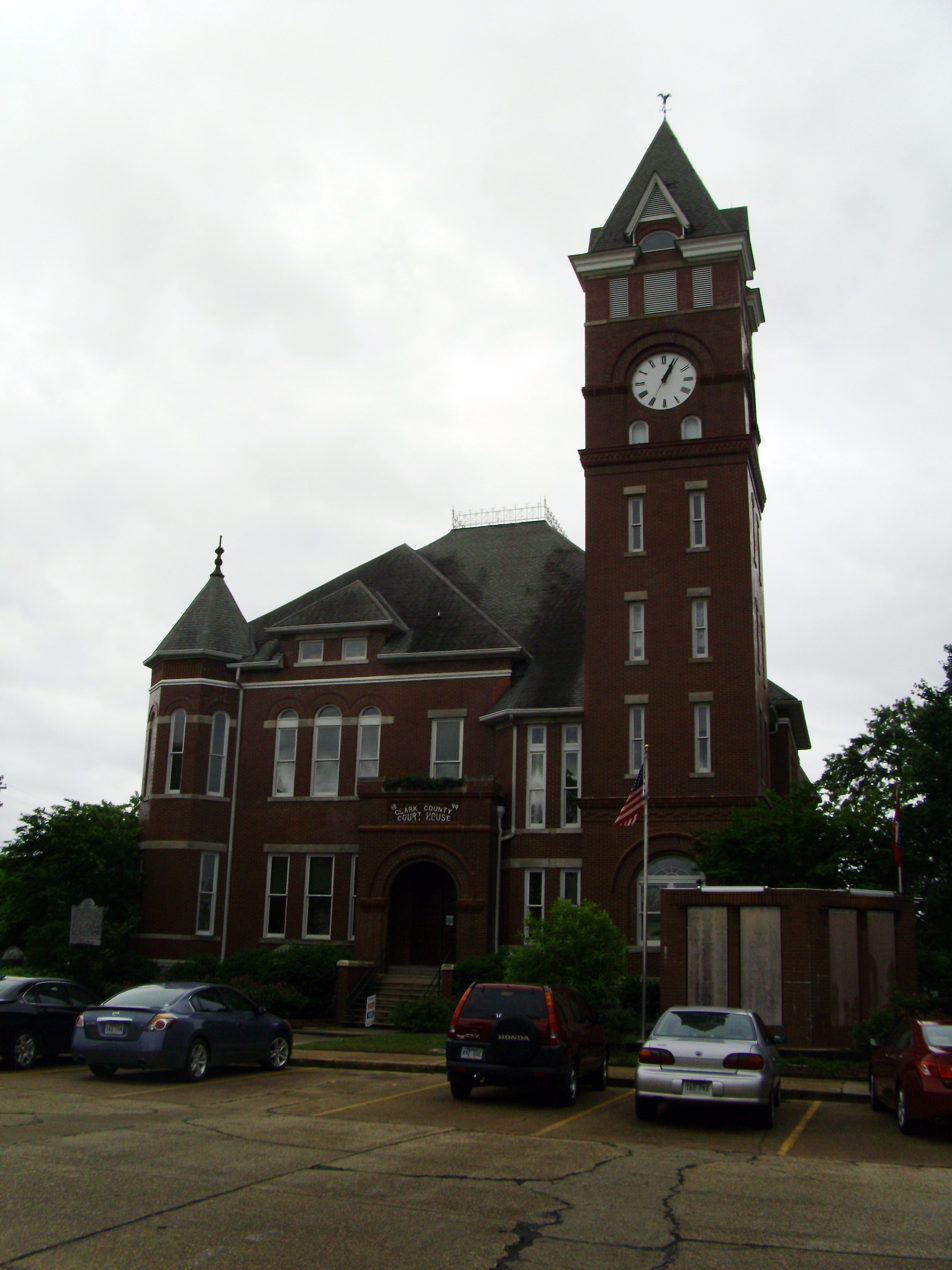

- Location within Arkansas Location within the United States
- Interactive map showing the location of Clark County Courthouse
- Location: 4th and Crittenden Sts., Arkadelphia, Arkansas
- Coordinates: 34°7′6″N 93°3′3″W
- Built: 1899
- Architect: Charles L. Thompson, R.S. O'Neal
- Architectural style: Romanesque
- NRHP reference No.: 78000577
- Added to NRHP: December 1, 1978

The Clark County Courthouse is located at Courthouse Square (4th and Crittenden) in Arkadelphia, Arkansas, the seat of Clark County. It is a 2 1/2-story Romanesque stone structure which was designed by Charles Thompson and completed in 1899. It is a basically rectangular structure with a hip roof, and a six-story tower rising from the northwest corner. It has a hip roof from which numerous hipped gables project, and there are corner turrets with conical roofs. It is the county's second courthouse.

The building was listed on the National Register of Historic Places in 1978.

== See also ==
- List of county courthouses in Arkansas
- National Register of Historic Places listings in Clark County, Arkansas
