= Curtis, Arkansas =

- Unincorporated community
- Location within Arkansas Location within the United States
- Coordinates: 33°59′52″N 93°06′21″W
- Country: United States
- State: Arkansas
- County: Clark
- Elevation: 239 ft (73 m)
- Time zone: UTC-6 (Central (CST))
  - Summer (DST): UTC-5 (CDT)
- ZIP code: 71728
- Area code: 870
- GNIS feature ID: 57620

Curtis is an unincorporated community in Clark County, Arkansas, United States. Curtis is located near U.S. Route 67, 9 miles (14 km) south-southwest of Arkadelphia. Curtis has a post office with ZIP code 71728.
