= Come See Me =

Come See Me may refer to:

- Come See Me (festival), Rock Hill, South Carolina, U.S.
- "Come See Me" (Pretty Things song), 1966
- "Come See Me" (112 song), 1996
- "Come See Me" (Rod Wave song), 2023
- "Come See Me", a 2006 song by Pitbull from his album El Mariel
- "Come See Me" a 2019 song by AOA from New Moon
