= Cecil Ivory =

Civil Rights era activist

Reverend Cecil Augustus Ivory
- Born: March 3, 1921; Arkadelphia, Arkansas
- Died: November 10, 1961 (aged 40); Rock Hill, South Carolina
- Education: Johnson C. Smith University

Reverend Cecil Augustus Ivory (March 3, 1921 – November 10, 1961) was a Presbyterian minister, disability rights activist and sit-in leader during the Civil rights movement.

In 2017, Ivory was named a Freedom Walkway Local Hero for his activism by the City of Rock Hill.

== Personal life ==
Ivory was born to an African American Baptist family in Arkadelphia, Arkansas on March 3, 1921. He was the third of four children, and his father died of a fever while Ivory was a toddler. As a fourteen-year-old, he received a significant back injury from a fall from a pecan tree, but taught himself to walk again since the family could not afford medical treatment. The injury may have caused a blood clot that later permanently disabled him.

Determined to continue his studies, he obtained a place at Cotton Plant Academy, a Presbyterian co-educational boarding school in Cotton Plant, Arkansas. At Cotton Plant Academy, he was the star of the football and basketball teams. Thanks to his football skills, he was offered a scholarship to attend Mary Allen Junior College, a Presbyterian school in Crockett, Texas, from 1937 to 1939. His time spent studying there drew him to the Presbyterian Church.

Ivory would go on to study at Johnson C. Smith University and earn a Bachelor of Arts and Bachelor of Divinity in 1946 from its school of theology. While at the university, he was the Dean of Pledges for the school's chapter of Kappa Alpha Psi.

After becoming ordained in 1947, Ivory served as a pastor of the First Presbyterian Church in Irmo, South Carolina. He was also the Director of Religious Education at Harbison Junior College.

In 1949, he transferred to Hermon Presbyterian Church in Rock Hill, South Carolina. While serving as a pastor, he frequently travelled into the countryside to serve at a rural mission church. During one of these trips, he fell off of a pick-up truck, which aggravated his childhood injury and caused him to use a wooden cane and then a wheelchair for mobility.

He also obtained a master's degree from the Interdenominational Theological Center in Atlanta, Georgia, and was awarded an honorary doctorate of divinity in 1960 from Johnson C. Smith University for his ministry.

Ivory was married to Emily Ivory in 1945, and they had three children: Darnell, Cecil Junior and Titus. The family often received bomb and death threats due to Ivory's activism, which led Ivory to sleep with a pistol in his nightstand for self-defense. Some of these threats came from the Rock Hill chapter of the Ku Klux Klan, which had grown in response to the civil rights protests in the area.

From June to October 1961, Ivory was hospitalized with severe pressure ulcers. He died on November 10, 1961, from an infection.

== Activism ==
Ivory led many protests against segregation in Rock Hill. He was the NAACP chapter president of the city from 1953 until his death in 1961, and organized sit-ins and bail postings for arrested activists.

=== Bus Boycott ===
In July 1957, he organized a bus boycott which kicked off a wave of civil rights activism among the city's black population. After a 24-year-old black woman, Adelene Austin White, was kicked off of a Star Transit Co. bus for sitting next to a white woman, Ivory called an NAACP meeting to coordinate a boycott and met with Austin personally.

The following Sunday, pastors of black churches around Rock Hill announced to their parishes that a boycott of the bus line would begin until the buses were desegregated.

Ivory also created a carpool service to provide rides to the community during the boycott. After a month, he collected donations and bought two used passenger buses to provide free bus service to the community. It was estimated that the boycott led to 90% of the city's black bus riders abandoning the line. By the end of the year, the Star Bus Line had closed.

=== Sit-Ins ===
After observing the success of the Greensboro sit-ins, Ivory organized a similar sit-in with students from Friendship Junior College. He arranged for nonviolent direct action training for the protesters from James Thomas McCain Sr. from the Congress of Racial Equality. On February 12, 1960, 150 black students entered Woolworth, McCrory's and Phillip's and Good's drugstores in downtown Rock Hill. The students were met with hostility and violence from white servers and hecklers. A counter-protester threw an ammonia bomb into Good's, and further bomb threats forced evacuation.

This did not deter Ivory, and he continued to organize further sit-ins. He also created and participated in marches, rallies and pickets downtown while in his wheelchair.

In June 1960, he held the first wheelchair sit-in by asking for service at McCrory's lunch counter. Ivory rolled up to the lunch counter and explained that he was not violating any of the Jim Crow laws that prohibited black customers from sitting there, since he was not actually sitting at any of the seats. After being denied service and threatened by the store's manager and a police officer, he was eventually arrested.

By February 1961, he had been arrested multiple times for leading and participating in protests around Rock Hill. For his leadership, the NAACP presented Ivory with a special citation honoring him as the leader of the bus boycott and a counselor student sit-ins. He was also granted a certificate of merit for the Rock Hill chapter's courageous and unselfish service. Ivory's actions were acknowledged and applauded by national civil rights leaders such as Ella Baker, Thurgood Marshall and James Farmer.

=== 1961 Freedom Ride ===
After John Lewis and Albert Bigelow were brutally attacked during the 1961 Freedom Ride at a Greyhound bus depot in Rock Hill, Ivory drove to the depot with a cadre of cars to meet the second bus of riders that afternoon. He rallied local supporters to shield the riders as they got to the cars. As an angry mob of white men followed and cursed at the cars, Ivory led the riders to his house and served them dinner. Charles Person, the youngest of the 1961 Freedom Riders, wrote in his memoir that Ivory's ability to "stand up to bigotry from a wheelchair" gave him the courage to continue on the Freedom Ride.
