= Rock Hill Galleria =

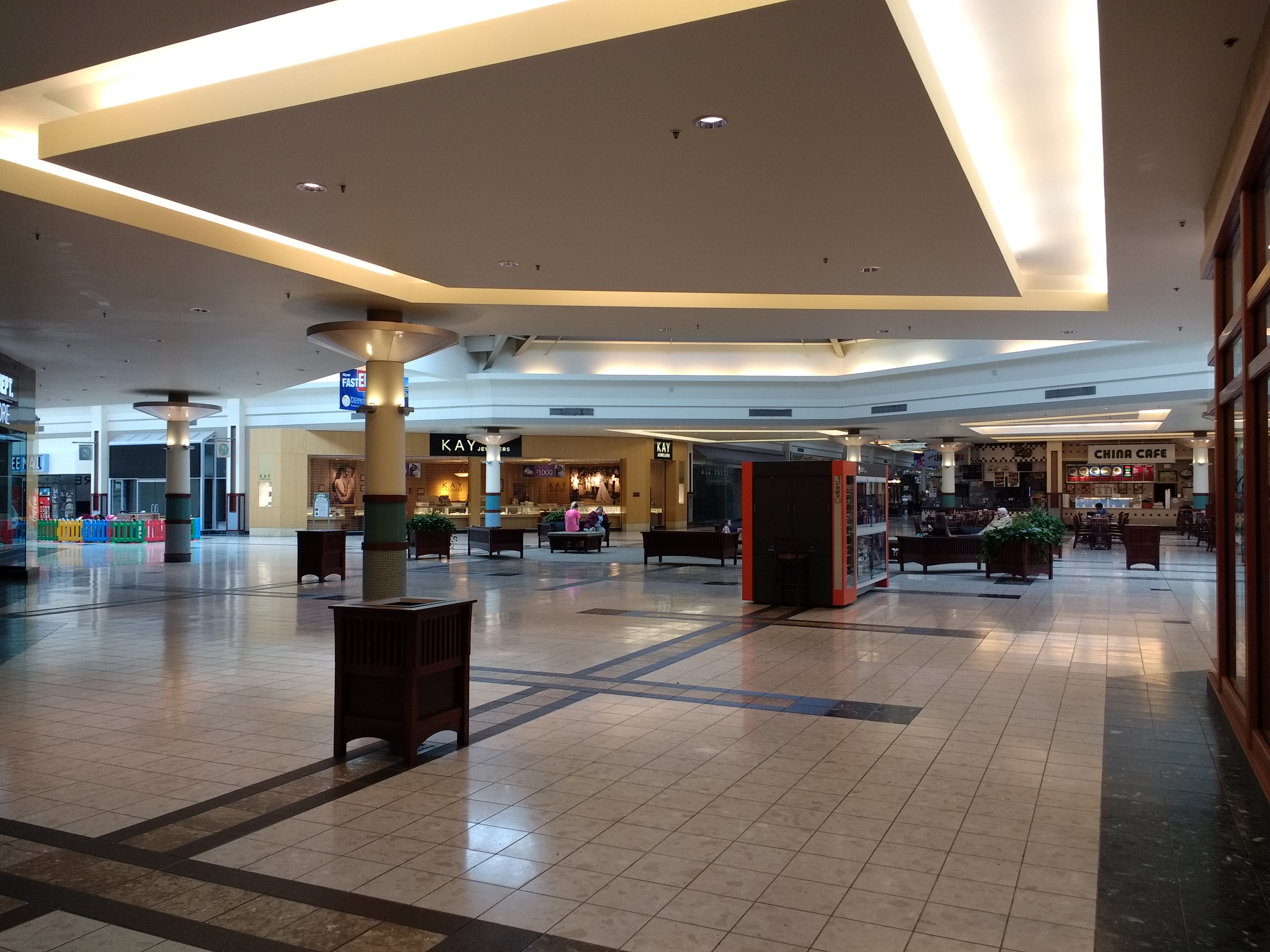
- Location: Rock Hill, South Carolina, United States
- Coordinates: 34°56′35″N 80°57′58″W
- Address: 2301 Dave Lyle Boulevard
- Opened: May 1991
- Developer: Zamias Services, Inc.
- Manager: Cypress Equities
- Num. of stores: 62
- Num. of anchor tenants: 6
- Floor area: 692,367 sq ft (64,323.0 m^{2})
- Floors: 1
- Parking: 3,000+
- Website: www.rockhillgalleria.com

Rock Hill Galleria is an enclosed regional shopping mall for York, Chester, and Lancaster Counties. It is located in Rock Hill, South Carolina, and is managed by Warren Norman Company. The mall has six anchor store spots which are currently occupied, by Belk, Walmart, Dick's Sporting Goods, Ashley HomeStore, Big Air Trampoline & Adventure Park, and Stars and Strikes.

== History ==
Zamias Services, Inc. developed Rock Hill Galleria, which opened for business on May 16, 1991. Leading up to the Galleria's opening, the two largest shopping malls in the area were Rock Hill Mall (opened in 1968), and Town Center Mall (enclosing part of Downtown Rock Hill, and opened in 1975).

All three of Rock Hill Mall's anchor stores (Belk, JCPenney and Sears) immediately moved to the Galleria as it opened, and this effectively dealt a death blow to Rock Hill Mall, its interior nearly emptied of occupied stores by early in 1993. Other anchors at the Galleria's opening included Phar-Mor and Walmart. Phar-Mor former closed after only one year in business, and was replaced with a Brendle's catalog showroom in October 1995, but Brendle's closed after only six months in business, following the chain's filing for Chapter 11 bankruptcy.

The Phar-Mor/Brendle's space remained vacant until 2004, when it was replaced by Steve & Barry's. Goody's was added as a new sixth anchor in 1998, having been delayed from an initial opening date of November 1997. Steve & Barry's, and Goody's closed in 2008 and 2009, respectively, following the respective bankruptcy of each chain. In 2013, the Belk store was renovated, while the JCPenney store was doubled in size.

In 2014, the former Goody's became Home South Furniture, while Revolutions, a bowling alley and bar, opened in the former Phar-Mor/Steve & Barry's space.

On November 8, 2018, Sears announced that it would be closing its Rock Hill Galleria location in early 2019 as part of a plan to close 40 stores. Revolutions and Home South both closed early in 2019. Revolutions was replaced by Stars and Strikes, a bowling alley, in 2023.

On June 4, 2020, JCPenney announced that its Galleria location would close as part of a plan to close 154 stores nationwide. JCPenney was eventually replaced by Dick's Sporting Goods in 2022.

Ashley HomeStore opened in a portion of the former Sears anchor space in 2024.

In late 2024, Big Air Trampoline & Adventure Park announced they would be opening a trampoline park in the former Home South store. The new trampoline park opened in May 16, 2026.
