= FC Carolina United =

- Nickname: FC Carolina United
- Founded: 2013; 13 years ago
- Ground: Manchester Meadows Soccer Complex
- Capacity: 2,000
- Owners: Dave Carton; Magnus Hedman
- GM & Head Coach: Paul Sheridan

FC Carolina United is a soccer organization based in Rock Hill, South Carolina near Charlotte, North Carolina. The team announced they would participate in the National Premier Soccer League starting with the 2014 season. The team will play at Manchester Meadows Soccer Complex which opened in 2006 and has a capacity of 750 seats. The club is supported by Swedish company Trig.com and with administrative support provided by Discoveries Soccer Club.
