= Boyd Hill, South Carolina =

Boyd Hill, Rock Hill
- Neighborhood
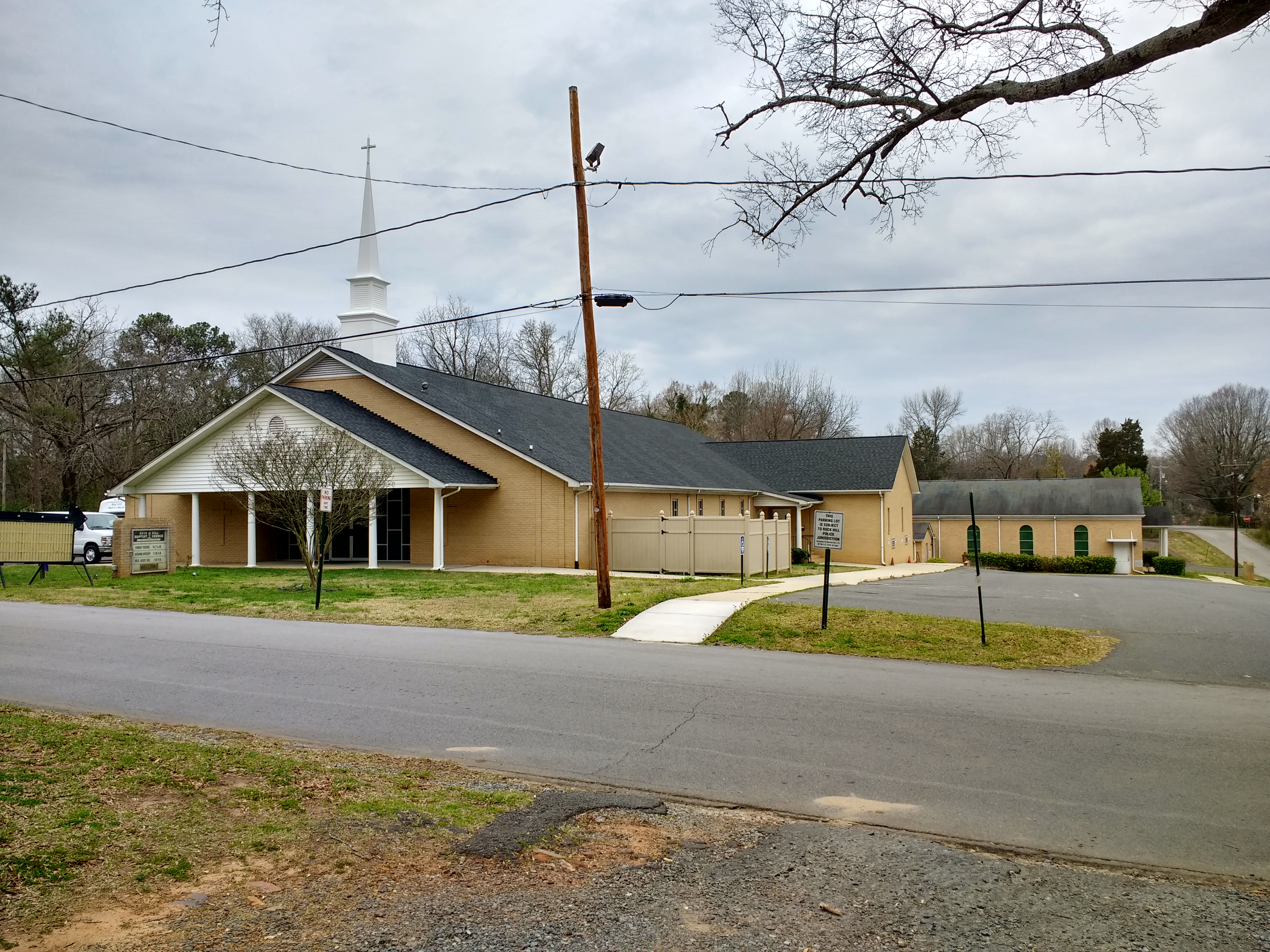
- Boyd Hill Baptist Church

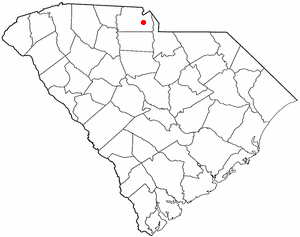
- Coordinates: 34°56′23″N 81°02′39″W
- Country: United States
- State: South Carolina
- County: York
- City: Rock Hill

Boyd Hill was an unincorporated community in western York County, South Carolina, but was annexed into the city of Rock Hill in the late 1940s. Boyd Hill is now a neighborhood of Rock Hill located at latitude 34.9396, longitude -81.0442 off of Cherry Road in the southwestern portion of the city. The elevation of the neighborhood is 641 feet (195 m).

== See also ==
- Oakdale, South Carolina
- Ebenezer, South Carolina
- Newport, South Carolina
