= Comporium =

American telecommunications company

Comporium, Inc.
- Company type: Private company
- Industry: Telecommunications
- Founded: 1894
- Headquarters: Rock Hill, SC, U.S.
- Key people: David Barnes - President & CEO
- Products: Landline Telephone Service, High-Speed Internet, Wireless Internet, Digital TV, Wireless Telephone (AT&T), and Security
- Number of employees: 1,000+
- Website: Comporium Homepage

Comporium, Inc. is a local telephone, internet, cable and home security provider that centrally operates in York and Lancaster counties in the north-central section of South Carolina. The Corporate headquarters of Comporium is located at the intersection of Black Street and Elizabeth Lane in the city of Rock Hill, South Carolina, United States.

== Locations ==
Comporium Communications offers services in parts or all of the following counties:

=== South Carolina ===
- Aiken
- Calhoun
- Chester
- Edgefield
- Lancaster
- Lexington
- Orangeburg
- Saluda
- York

=== North Carolina ===
- Mecklenburg — Serving the Ayrsley area in Steele Creek and areas of Pineville.
- Transylvania

== History ==
In 1894, John Anderson, John Cherry and Andrew Smith founded the Rock Hill Telephone Company. E. L. and Mary Barnes bought the company in 1912; their great-grandchildren still run the company today. In 2001, Rock Hill Telephone Company and its affiliates became known as "Comporium," a word created from "Communications" and "Emporium"— a one-stop shop for a variety of products and services.
