= Jerry K. Thomasson =

American politician

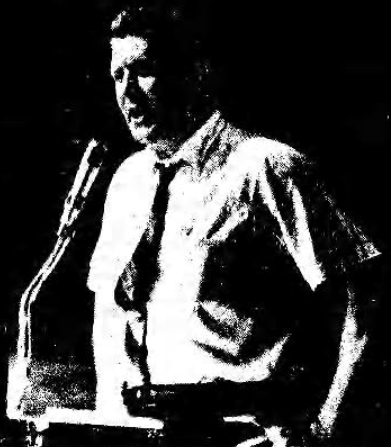
- Thomasson in 1968

Member of the Arkansas House of Representatives
- In office 1963–1966

Personal details
- Born: Jerry Kreth Thomasson; October 17, 1931 Arkadelphia, Arkansas, U.S.
- Died: April 29, 2007 (aged 75)
- Party: Democratic; Republican
- Education: Henderson State University; Arkansas Law School

Jerry Kreth Thomasson (October 17, 1931 – April 29, 2007) was an American politician. A member of the Democratic Party and the Republican Party, he served in the Arkansas House of Representatives from 1963 to 1966.

== Life and career ==
Thomasson was born in Arkadelphia, Arkansas, the son of Joseph Baron Thomasson and Gertrude Dean. He attended and graduated from Arkadelphia High School. After graduating, he attended Henderson State University. He also attended Arkansas Law School, earning his JD degree in 1959, which after earning his degree, he served in the armed forces in the Korean War.

Thomasson served in the Arkansas House of Representatives from 1963 to 1966. After his service in the House, in 1966, he ran as a Republican candidate for attorney general of Arkansas. He received 246,133 votes, but lost to Democratic candidate Joe Purcell, who won with 287,983 votes.

== Death ==
Thomasson died on April 29, 2007, at the age of 75.
