= United States Post Office and Courthouse (Rock Hill, South Carolina) =

- US Post Office and Courthouse
- U.S. National Register of Historic Places
- U.S. Historic district – Contributing property
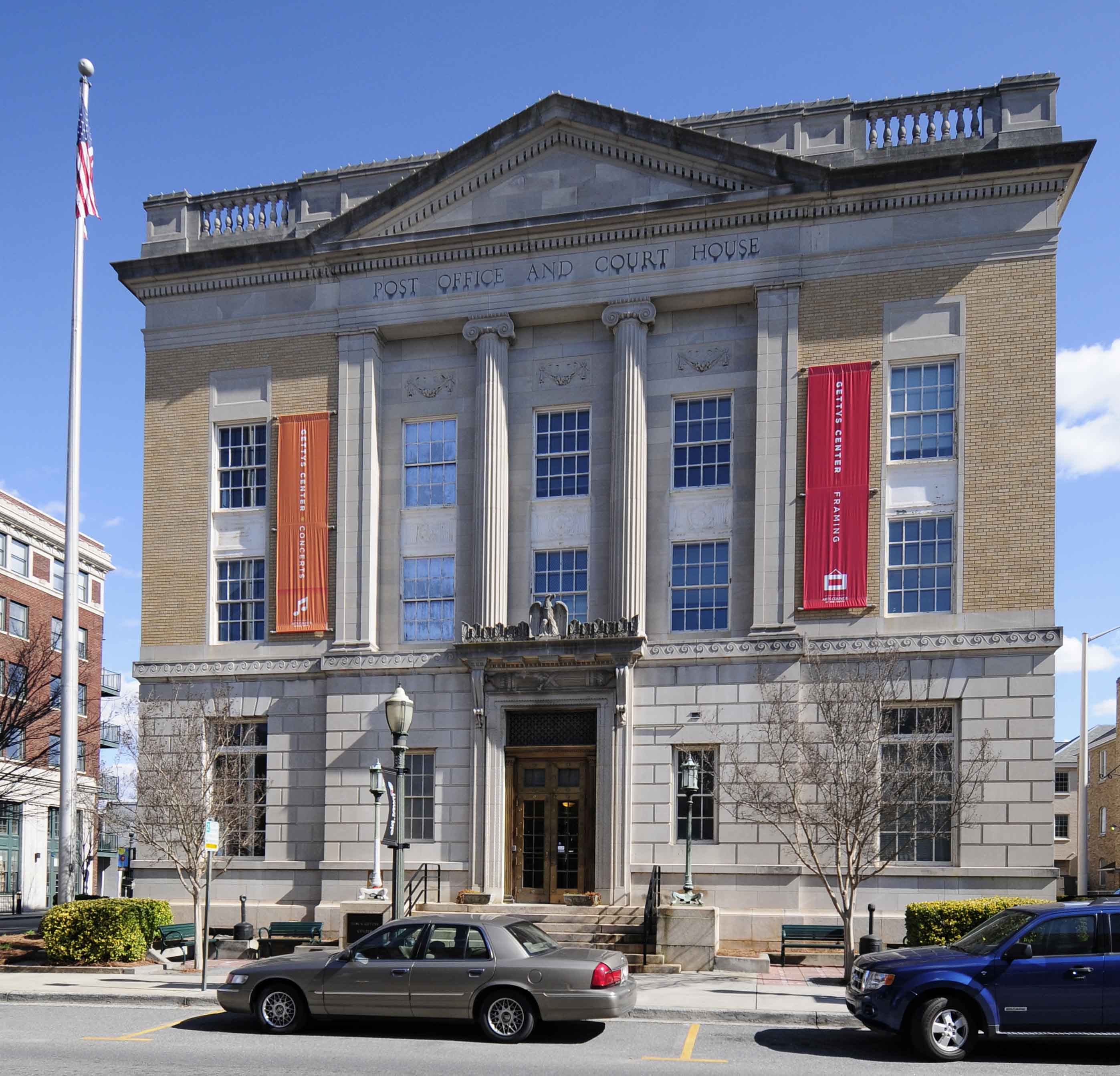
- The building in March 2012

- Location within South Carolina Location within the United States
- Location: 201 E. Main St., Rock Hill, South Carolina
- Coordinates: 34°55′30″N 81°1′33″W
- Area: less than one acre
- Built: 1931-1932
- Built by: Batson-Cook Co.
- Architect: James A. Wetmore; Treasury Dept.
- NRHP reference No.: 87002523
- Added to NRHP: January 21, 1988

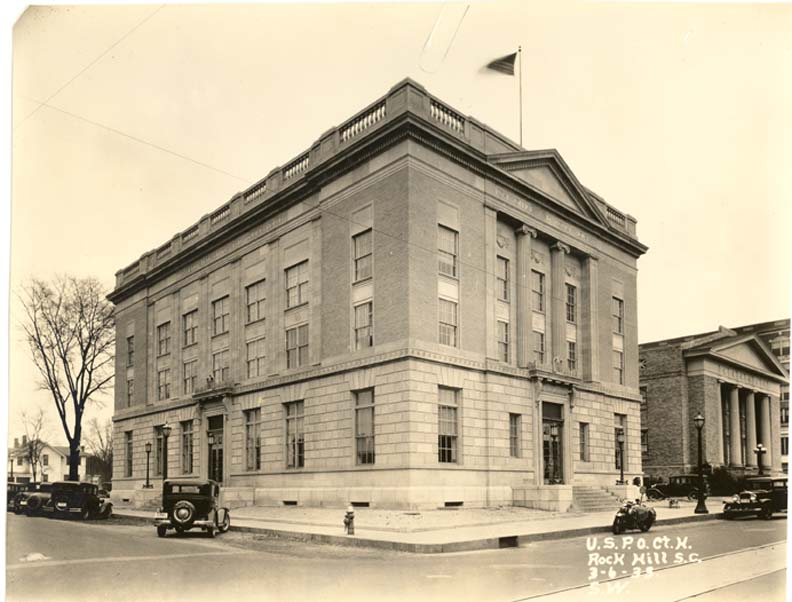
U.S. Post Office and Courthouse circa 1933

The U.S. Post Office and Courthouse in Rock Hill, South Carolina, currently known as the Tom S. Gettys Center, was built in 1931–1932. It served historically as a courthouse and as a post office, and is currently in use as a community arts center.

The building was listed on the National Register of Historic Places in 1988. It is located within the Rock Hill Downtown Historic District and the Downtown Rock Hill Cultural District.

== History ==
=== As a federal building ===
The building's construction was symbolic of the significant growth in population and commercial development in the first third of the twentieth century. Following the passage of the Public Buildings Act of 1926, plans for a new Federal building were prepared by James A. Wetmore. The building replaced an existing post office that Rock Hill had outgrown, which was sold to the city, moved, and refurbished as the new public library.

Ground broke on July 8, 1931, with excavation for the new building's foundations. Construction continued through the rest of the year and into the next, and the building officially opened for business on Monday, November 28, 1932. Described by local news publication The Rock Hill Evening Herald as "...handsome in every respect," the U.S. Post Office and Courthouse stood as a marvel in Rock Hill's still-growing downtown. During this time, it was also known as the "Caldwell Street Post Office."

Multiple postmasters would conduct their work in the building over the next four decades, including Thomas S. Gettys, who later represented Rock Hill in the United States House of Representatives and whose name the building would reflect decades later. Rock Hill's continued growth and logistics surrounding the change from foot to vehicle delivery eventually necessitated another, larger facility. A new post office with expanded capacity was opened in Rock Hill on September 7, 1971. The building was then sold to the City of Rock Hill on September 5, 1986.

The building housed multiple occupants over the years, with the local Arts Council moving in as early as 1987. In 1997, it was officially renamed the Tom S. Gettys Center in honor of the previous postmaster who had served in it.

=== Current function as an arts center ===
In recent decades, the building has primarily served as a community arts center, facilitating Rock Hill's vibrant visual and performing arts scene. The Arts Council of York County utilizes the space to offer accessible artist studios, galleries, and a performing arts space in the building's original courtroom space. The Rock Hill Pottery Center opened on the ground floor in 2006, and multiple arts nonprofit organizations currently operate out of the building. The building serves as an access point for the community to engage with creative culture at programs and events such as gallery receptions and open studios.

Music concerts, performance art pieces, and theatre productions are frequently held in the Courtroom, which has retained most of its original architecture and design. Some of Rock Hill's recurring cultural festivals also utilize the space, such as the Blues and Jazz festival, the Underexposed Film Festival YC, and local music showcase Don't Sweat It Fest.
