= Hermon Presbyterian Church =

Historic church in South Carolina, United States

- U.S. National Register of Historic Places
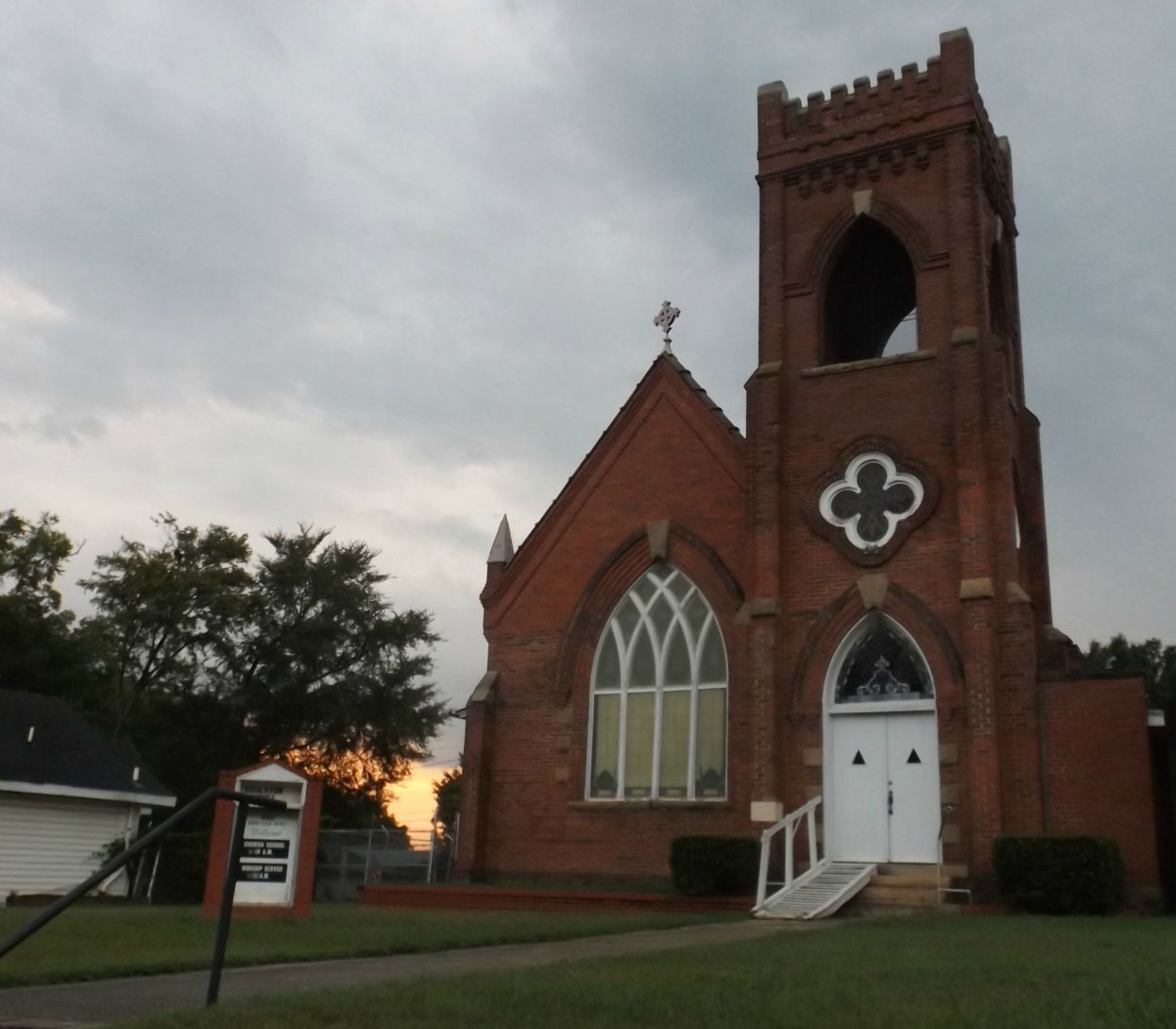

- Location within South Carolina Location within the United States
- Location: 446 Dave Lyle Blvd., Rock Hill, South Carolina
- Coordinates: 34°55′24″N 81°2′3″W
- Area: less than one acre
- Built: 1897
- Architectural style: Late Gothic Revival
- MPS: Rock Hill MPS
- NRHP reference No.: 92000652
- Added to NRHP: June 10, 1992

Hermon Presbyterian Church is a historic church at 446 Dave Lyle Boulevard in Rock Hill, South Carolina.

It was built in 1897 and added to the National Register of Historic Places in 1992.
