= Rock Hill Downtown Historic District =

Historic church in South Carolina, United States

- U.S. National Register of Historic Places
- U.S. Historic district
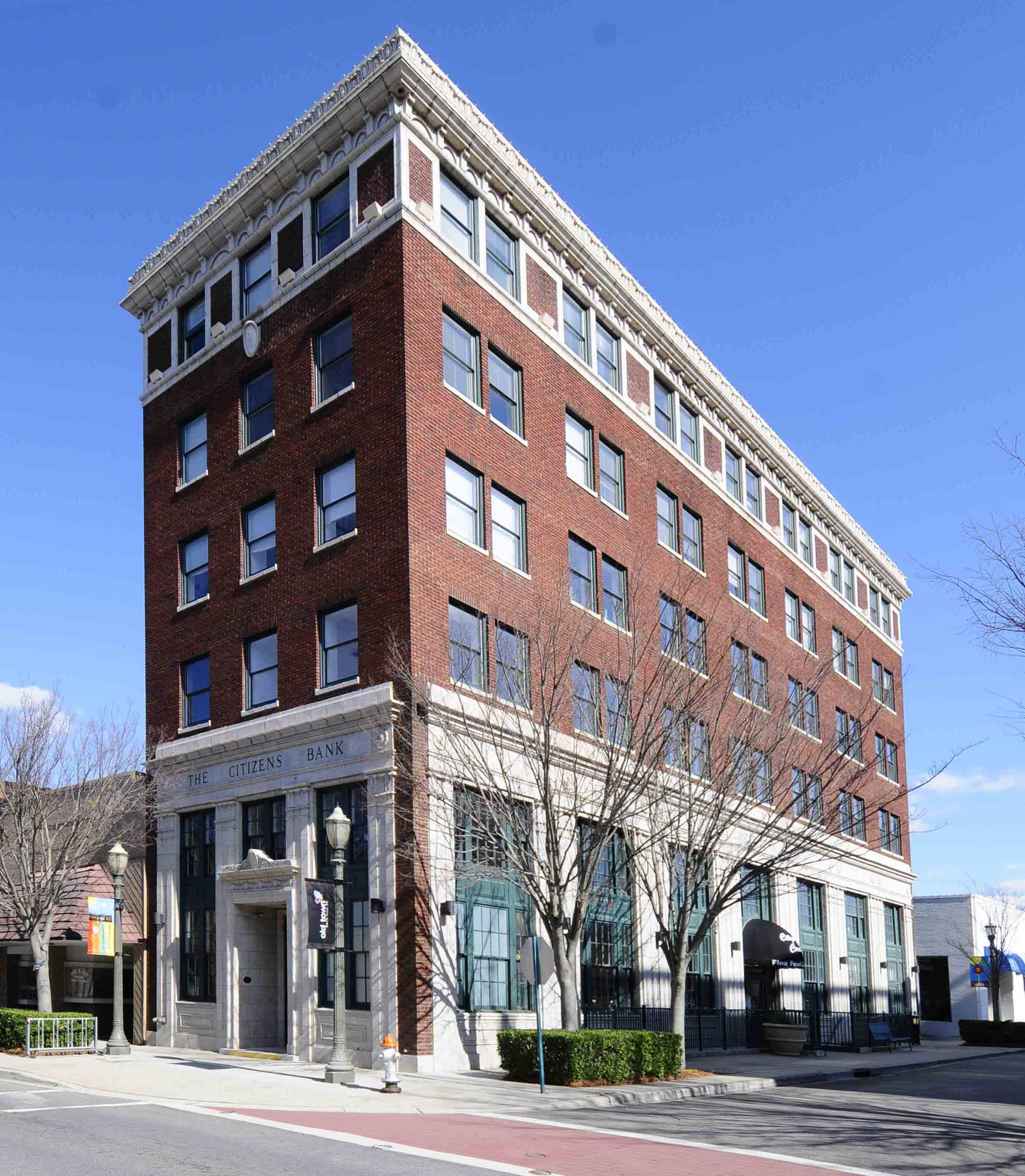
- Citizen's Bank Building

- Location within South Carolina
- Location: Roughly, S. Oakland Ave. from S of Peoples Pl. to E. Main St., Rock Hill, South Carolina
- Coordinates: 34°55′31″N 81°1′30″W
- Area: 10 acres (4.0 ha)
- Architect: Multiple
- Architectural style: Classical Revival, Late Gothic Revival, Commercial block, Other
- MPS: Rock Hill MPS
- NRHP reference No.: 91000828
- Added to NRHP: June 24, 1991

Rock Hill Downtown Historic District consists of twelve contiguous buildings built between 1870 and 1931 in downtown Rock Hill in York County, South Carolina.

The twelve buildings are:

- Episcopal Church of Our Saviour, 144 Caldwell St.
- First Associate Reformed Presbyterian Church, 201 E. White St.
- First Baptist Church, 215 E. Main St.
- St. John's United Methodist Church, St. John's Court
- Old Post Office Building, 325 Oakland Ave.
- Post Office and Federal Building, 102 E. Main St.
- Andrew Jackson Hotel, 223 E. Main St.
- Citizens Bank Building, 157 E. Main St.
- McFadden Building, 212 E. Main St.
- Bass Furniture Company, 208-210 E. Main St.
- Fink's Department Store 206 E. Main St.
- Rock Hill Supply Company, 202 E. Main St.

In 1931 the Old Post Office Building was moved about a block from its original site where the new Post Office now stands. The Old Post Office then served as a library, until 1974, and now serves as a private office building. It was built in 1906 and designed by James Knox Taylor, the Supervising Architect of the Treasury.
