= Town Center Mall (Rock Hill) =

- Coordinates: 34.92581°N 81.02732°W
- Opened: 1975
- Closed: 1993-06-10

Town Center Mall was an enclosed shopping mall located in downtown Rock Hill, South Carolina. It opened in 1975. The mall was created by building a roof over several blocks of downtown Rock Hill's Main Street, extending from Hampton Street on the eastern end, to Dave Lyle Boulevard on the west. After a decline in popularity of the enclosed mall over much of downtown, the roof and the mall were demolished in 1993, to allow for the rebuilding of a traditional downtown.

== History ==
Town Center Mall was constructed over Main Street, and opened for business in 1975. Initially popular, this downtown mall contained a Belk, pawn shop, record store, and others, and was stated to be the "first climitased Main Street mall in the country". It competed with nearby Rock Hill Mall through the 1970s and 1980s. By August 1992, the Rock Hill City Council saw that the downtown area (and the mall in particular) needed redevelopment, and voted to demolish the roof over Main Street. With this, Town Center Mall closed on June 10, 1993, with a "Raze the Roof" party. The blocks of Main Street formerly occupied by the mall were re-opened to car and foot traffic on October 2, 1994, with a parade.

The Downtown Rock Hill area, much of which had been covered by the mall for decades, is also known today as Old Town.
