= Arkadelphia, Arkansas =

- City
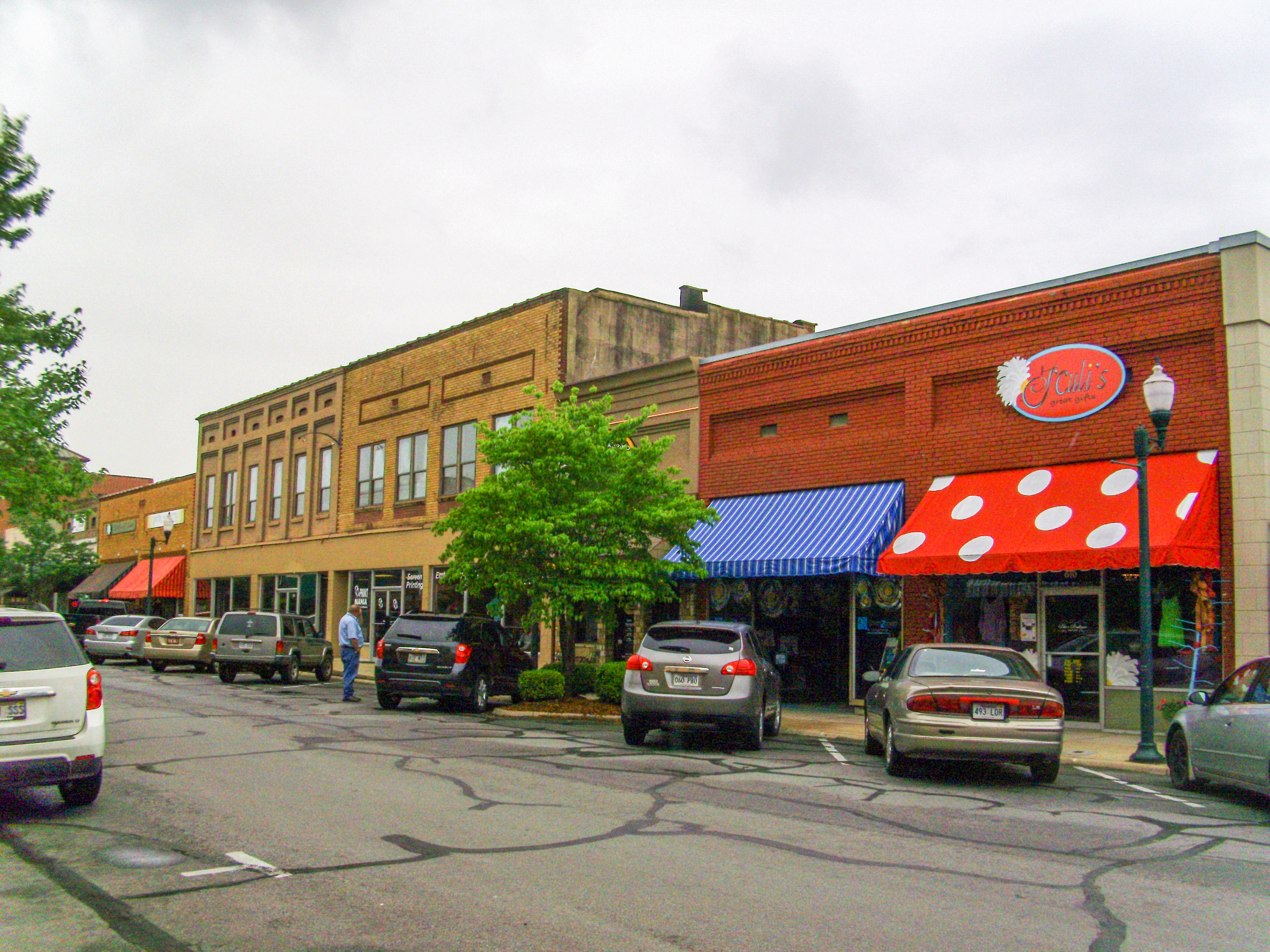
- Downtown Arkadelphia
- Etymology: Greek for "Brother of Arkansas"
- Location of Arkadelphia in Clark County, Arkansas

- Location within Arkansas Location within the United States Location within North America
- Coordinates: 34°7′19″N 93°3′58″W
- Country: United States
- State: Arkansas
- County: Clark
- Township: Caddo
- Incorporated: January 6, 1857

Government
  - Type: City manager

Area
  - Total: 7.73 sq mi (20.03 km^{2})
  - Land: 7.73 sq mi (20.02 km^{2})
  - Water: 0.0077 sq mi (0.02 km^{2})
- Elevation: 246 ft (75 m)

Population (2020)
  - Total: 10,380
  - Estimate (2025): 9,916 ▼
  - Density: 1,343/sq mi (518.6/km^{2})
- Time zone: UTC−6 (Central (CST))
  - Summer (DST): UTC−5 (CDT)
- ZIP Codes: 71923, 71998–71999
- Area code: 870
- FIPS code: 05-01870
- GNIS feature ID: 0076188
- Website: www.arkadelphia.gov

Arkadelphia is a city in and the county seat of Clark County, Arkansas, United States. The city is located near the Ouachita River at the foothills of the Ouachita Mountains, along the Interstate 30 corridor between Little Rock and Texarkana. As of the 2020 census, the population was 10,380.

Arkadelphia developed as a river and railroad trading center and later became known as an educational center in southwest Arkansas. It is home to Henderson State University and Ouachita Baptist University, whose neighboring campuses and football rivalry, the Battle of the Ravine, are central to the city's college-town identity. Arkadelphia was incorporated in 1857.

== History ==
=== Early settlement and Blakelytown ===
The area that became Arkadelphia was inhabited by Indigenous peoples before European-American settlement, including Caddo and Quapaw peoples in the broader region. The site of modern Arkadelphia developed on a bluff overlooking the Ouachita River. In 1809, Adam Blakely established a blacksmith shop at the site, which became known as Blakelytown.

In 1811, John Hemphill began operating a salt works nearby, often described as one of Arkansas's earliest manufacturing establishments. By 1812, Jacob Barkman had opened river traffic on the Ouachita River to New Orleans, first by pirogue and later by keelboat.

=== County seat and incorporation ===
By the late 1830s, the first lots were platted, and Blakelytown became Arkadelphia. The origin of the name is uncertain. Later accounts connect it to Greek words associated with brotherhood and with the idyllic Greek region of Arkadia, though the Encyclopedia of Arkansas notes that some settlers may have borrowed the name from Arkadelphia, Alabama.

Arkadelphia became the seat of Clark County in 1842, and a brick courthouse and jail were completed in 1844. The city was incorporated on January 6, 1857.

=== Civil War and Reconstruction ===
During the American Civil War, Arkadelphia supplied troops to the Confederate army and served as a medicinal and munitions depot, source of salt, and ordnance works. Harris Flanagin, an Arkadelphia resident, served as Arkansas's Confederate governor during the war. On April 1–2, 1864, the Skirmish at Arkadelphia ended in a Union victory.

After the Civil War, the arrival of the Cairo and Fulton railroad line in 1873 connected Arkadelphia to Little Rock and strengthened its role as a transportation, farm-market, and trading center.

=== Railroad, industry, and education ===
The railroad helped Arkadelphia grow as a center for timber, sawmilling, agriculture, and commerce. Short-line railroad spurs extended into nearby pine forests, supporting sawmill towns and local manufacturing. By the late 19th century, Arkadelphia had become an educational center as well as a commercial one.

Ouachita Baptist College was established in 1886, and Arkadelphia Methodist College, later Henderson State University, was founded in 1890. Other institutions founded in the period included schools and colleges for African American students, including Bethel College and the Colored Presbyterian Industrial School.

=== 1997 tornado and recovery ===
On March 1, 1997, an F4 tornado struck Arkadelphia during a larger tornado outbreak across Arkansas. The tornado caused severe damage across much of the city, including downtown Arkadelphia, where sixty blocks sustained heavy damage. In the Arkadelphia area, the storm damaged or destroyed about 250 houses, 90 mobile homes, and 45 businesses. Five people were killed in Arkadelphia, and a sixth person was killed in a vehicle on Interstate 30 southwest of the city.

=== Twenty-first century ===
In the 21st century, Arkadelphia has continued to function as Clark County's seat, a college town, and a regional center for education, manufacturing, tourism, and outdoor recreation. The city is part of the Diamond Lakes region and serves as a gateway to nearby recreational areas, including DeGray Lake and DeGray Lake Resort State Park.

== Geography ==
Arkadelphia is located in northeastern Clark County on the west bank of the Ouachita River.

According to the United States Census Bureau, the city has a total area of 7.73 square miles (20.03 km^{2}), of which 7.73 square miles (20.02 km^{2}) is land and 0.01 square miles (0.02 km^{2}) is water.

=== Climate ===
The climate is characterized by hot, humid summers and generally mild to cool winters. According to the Köppen climate classification system, Arkadelphia has a humid subtropical climate, abbreviated "Cfa" on climate maps. Arkadelphia was once known as the "City of Rainbows", perhaps because the humid climate often resulted in rain.

Climate data for Arkadelphia, Arkansas (1991–2020 normals, extremes 1899–present)
Month	Jan	Feb	Mar	Apr	May	Jun	Jul	Aug	Sep	Oct	Nov	Dec	Year
Record high °F (°C)	89 (32)	87 (31)	92 (33)	95 (35)	108 (42)	112 (44)	112 (44)	113 (45)	109 (43)	102 (39)	86 (30)	82 (28)	113 (45)
Mean daily maximum °F (°C)	54.7 (12.6)	58.8 (14.9)	67.5 (19.7)	76.3 (24.6)	82.8 (28.2)	90.1 (32.3)	93.6 (34.2)	93.8 (34.3)	87.7 (30.9)	77.6 (25.3)	65.2 (18.4)	57.1 (13.9)	75.4 (24.1)
Daily mean °F (°C)	42.7 (5.9)	46.3 (7.9)	54.5 (12.5)	63.2 (17.3)	71.3 (21.8)	79.1 (26.2)	82.4 (28.0)	81.8 (27.7)	75.3 (24.1)	64.0 (17.8)	52.6 (11.4)	45.4 (7.4)	63.2 (17.3)
Mean daily minimum °F (°C)	30.7 (−0.7)	33.8 (1.0)	41.5 (5.3)	50.0 (10.0)	59.8 (15.4)	68.0 (20.0)	71.2 (21.8)	69.8 (21.0)	62.9 (17.2)	50.5 (10.3)	40.1 (4.5)	33.7 (0.9)	51.0 (10.6)
Record low °F (°C)	−2 (−19)	−6 (−21)	9 (−13)	23 (−5)	34 (1)	46 (8)	52 (11)	48 (9)	33 (1)	25 (−4)	11 (−12)	0 (−18)	−6 (−21)
Average precipitation inches (mm)	4.03 (102)	4.20 (107)	4.88 (124)	5.33 (135)	6.60 (168)	3.89 (99)	4.09 (104)	3.32 (84)	3.77 (96)	4.92 (125)	4.40 (112)	5.41 (137)	54.84 (1,393)
Average snowfall inches (cm)	0.4 (1.0)	0.6 (1.5)	0.3 (0.76)	0.0 (0.0)	0.0 (0.0)	0.0 (0.0)	0.0 (0.0)	0.0 (0.0)	0.0 (0.0)	0.0 (0.0)	0.0 (0.0)	0.1 (0.25)	1.4 (3.6)
Average precipitation days (≥ 0.01 in)	7.3	6.7	7.4	6.7	7.3	5.8	5.9	5.1	4.7	6.1	6.5	6.7	76.2
Average snowy days (≥ 0.1 in)	0.2	0.3	0.1	0.0	0.0	0.0	0.0	0.0	0.0	0.0	0.0	0.1	0.7
Source: NOAA

== Demographics ==
Historical population
Census	Pop.	Note	%±
1850	248		—
1860	905		264.9%
1870	948		4.8%
1880	1,506		58.9%
1890	2,455		63.0%
1900	2,739		11.6%
1910	2,745		0.2%
1920	3,311		20.6%
1930	3,380		2.1%
1940	5,078		50.2%
1950	6,819		34.3%
1960	8,069		18.3%
1970	9,841		22.0%
1980	10,005		1.7%
1990	10,014		0.1%
2000	10,912		9.0%
2010	10,714		−1.8%
2020	10,380		−3.1%
2025 (est.)	9,916	▼	−4.5%
U.S. Decennial Census

=== 2020 census ===
Arkadelphia racial composition
Race	Num.	Perc.
White (non-Hispanic)	5,994	57.75%
Black or African American (non-Hispanic)	3,255	31.36%
Native American	36	0.35%
Asian	137	1.32%
Pacific Islander	13	0.13%
Other/Mixed	475	4.58%
Hispanic or Latino	470	4.53%

As of the 2020 census, Arkadelphia had a population of 10,380, with 3,585 households and 1,966 families.

The median age was 24.2 years. 16.4% of residents were under the age of 18 and 14.3% were 65 years of age or older. For every 100 females, there were 83.5 males, and for every 100 females age 18 and over, there were 78.9 males age 18 and over.

97.2% of residents lived in urban areas, while 2.8% lived in rural areas.

Of the households in Arkadelphia, 27.7% had children under the age of 18 living in them. 30.5% were married-couple households, 20.9% were households with a male householder and no spouse or partner present, and 42.6% were households with a female householder and no spouse or partner present. About 39.9% of households were made up of individuals, and 15.1% had someone living alone who was 65 years of age or older.

There were 4,349 housing units, of which 17.6% were vacant. The homeowner vacancy rate was 2.4%, and the rental vacancy rate was 18.4%.

=== 2010 census ===
As of the 2010 United States census, there were 10,714 people living in the city. The racial makeup of the city was 64.0% White, 30.0% Black, 0.4% Native American, 0.8% Asian, <0.1% Pacific Islander, 0.1% from some other race and 1.4% from two or more races. 3.2% were Hispanic or Latino of any race.

=== 2000 census ===
As of the census of 2000, there were 10,912 people, 3,865 households, and 2,187 families living in the city. The population density was 1,486.2 inhabitants per square mile (573.8/km^{2}). There were 4,216 housing units at an average density of 574.2 per square mile (221.7/km^{2}). The racial makeup of the city was 68.98% White, 26.51% Black or African American, 0.53% Native American, 1.29% Asian, 0.05% Pacific Islander, 1.35% from other races, and 1.28% from two or more races. Hispanic or Latino of any race were 2.59% of the population.

There were 3,865 households, out of which 27.0% had children under the age of 18 living with them, 38.6% were married couples living together, 15.3% had a female householder with no husband present, and 43.4% were non-families. 31.7% of all households were made up of individuals, and 13.7% had someone living alone who was 65 years of age or older. The average household size was 2.26 and the average family size was 2.87.

In the city, the age distribution of the population showed 18.1% under the age of 18, 32.9% from 18 to 24, 20.4% from 25 to 44, 14.5% from 45 to 64, and 14.1% who were 65 years of age or older. The median age was 24 years. For every 100 females, there were 85.6 males. For every 100 females age 18 and over, there were 82.4 males.

The median income for a household in the city was $26,651, and the median income for a family was $42,479. Males had a median income of $30,152 versus $19,459 for females. The per capita income for the city was $13,268. About 19.8% of families and 23.2% of the population were below the poverty line, including 25.8% of those under the age of 18 and 15.9% of those 65 and older.

== Economy ==
Arkadelphia's economy is influenced by education, manufacturing, health care, retail, tourism, and its role as the seat of Clark County. The city's two universities, Ouachita Baptist University and Henderson State University, are major local institutions, along with the Arkadelphia Public School District. Manufacturing has historically included timber-related industries and later industrial employers such as Georgia-Pacific and Siplast.

The city also serves as a gateway to the Caddo and Ouachita river region and nearby recreational areas, including DeGray Lake Resort State Park. Tourism activity is supported by the Diamond Lakes region and the city's location along Interstate 30 and Arkansas Highway 7.

== Arts, culture, and tourism ==
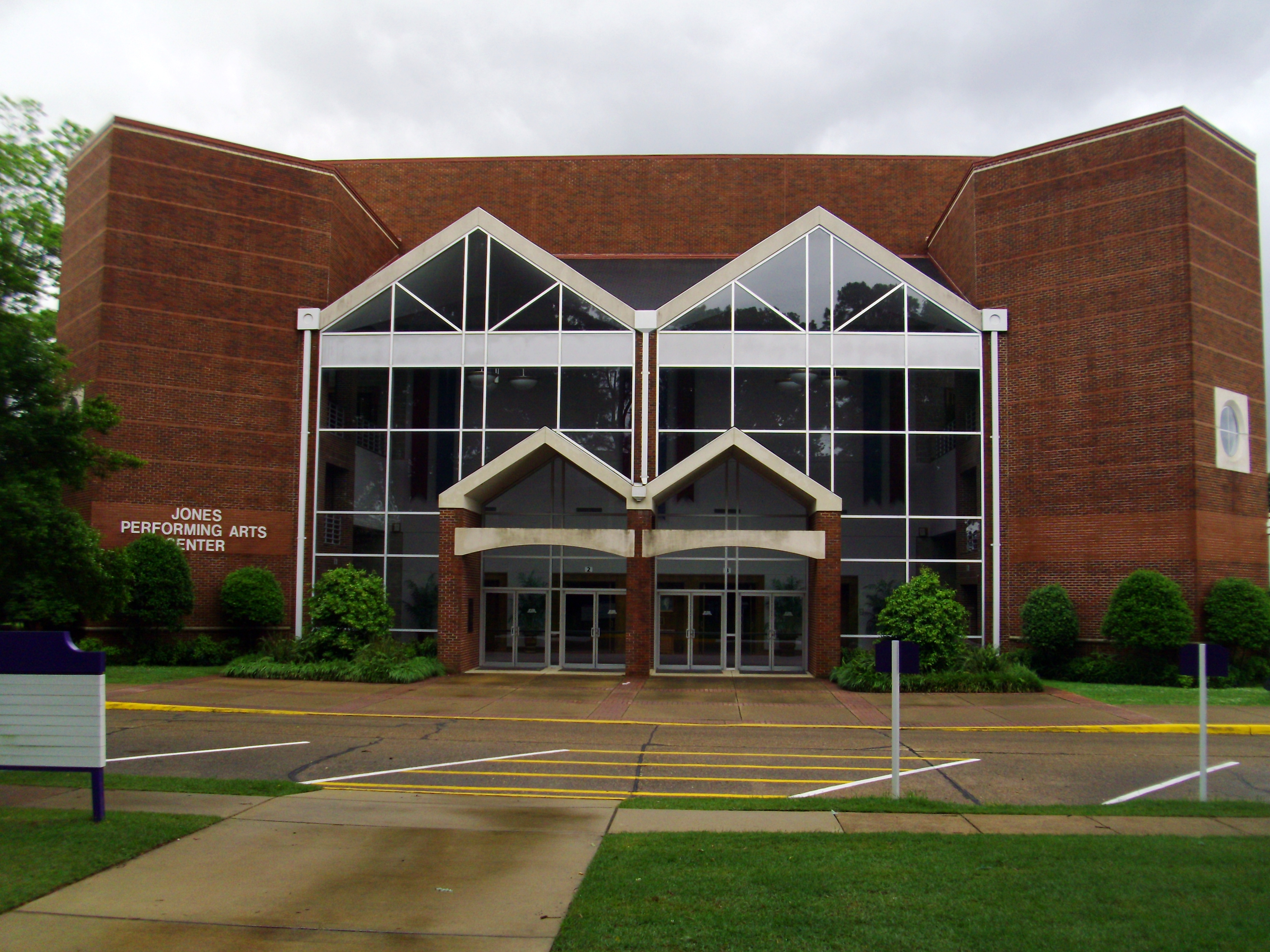
Jones Performing Arts Center on OBU's campus

=== Historic sites ===
Downtown Arkadelphia includes the Arkadelphia Commercial Historic District, which consists of twenty-nine contributing buildings in the heart of the city's downtown and was added to the National Register of Historic Places on July 20, 2011. The district is roughly bounded by Main Street between Fifth and Seventh streets and Clinton Street between Sixth and Ninth streets.

Other historic sites and buildings include the Arkadelphia Confederate Monument, the Clark County Courthouse, the Clark County Library, the Captain Henderson House, and the historic Missouri Pacific Railroad Depot.

=== Museums and performing arts ===
The Clark County Historical Museum is based in the former Amtrak station and contains artifacts related to the history of Arkadelphia and Clark County. The Captain Henderson House is a historic bed and breakfast owned and operated by Henderson State University and originally inhabited by the university's namesake.

Opened in 2011, the Arkadelphia Arts Center hosts exhibits, productions, and educational workshops for organizations including the Caddo River Art Guild, the Poet and Writer's Guild, the Little Theatre, the two universities, and Arkadelphia School District. Henderson State University holds plays and musical performances in Arkansas Hall located on campus. Ouachita Baptist University displays student art and sculpture in the Hammons Gallery, while OBU performing arts take place in the Jones Performing Arts Center on Ouachita Street.

=== Outdoor recreation ===
Arkadelphia is located near several outdoor recreation areas in the Ouachita foothills. DeGray Lake Resort State Park, located near Arkadelphia, includes a lodge, marina, convention center, golf course, tennis courts, and other recreation facilities. DeGray Lake, created by a U.S. Army Corps of Engineers project on the Caddo River, has 208 miles of shoreline and 13,800 acres of water.

Other area attractions include the Diamond Lakes Regional Visitors Center, the Reynolds Science Center Planetarium on the Henderson State University campus, and DeSoto Bluff overlooking the Ouachita River.

== Education ==
Arkadelphia has long been known as an educational center in southwest Arkansas. The city was once home to the Arkansas Institute for the Blind, whose former building later became the first home of Ouachita Baptist College.

The city is home to Ouachita Baptist University, a private Baptist university founded in 1886, and Henderson State University, a public university founded in 1890 as Arkadelphia Methodist College. The two campuses sit across U.S. Highway 67 from each other and have a long football rivalry known as the Battle of the Ravine. The game is promoted as the only college football rivalry in the country in which the visiting team walks rather than travels by bus or plane to a road contest.

Public school students are served by the Arkadelphia Public School District, which includes Arkadelphia High School, Goza Middle School, Perritt Primary School, and Peake Elementary School.

== Transportation ==
Arkadelphia is located along Interstate 30 and is served by U.S. Highway 67, Arkansas Highway 7, and Arkansas Highway 8. The city is also served by the Arkadelphia station, an Amtrak stop on the Texas Eagle route.

== Government ==
Arkadelphia operates under a city manager form of government. The city manager works with the mayor and reports to the city's Board of Directors. Arkadelphia is the county seat of Clark County, and the Clark County Courthouse is located downtown.

== Notable people ==
- Henry G. Bennett, longest-serving president of Oklahoma State University
- Harley Bozeman, politician and confidant of Huey Long and Earl Long
- Trent Bryant, professional football player
- V. L. Cox, artist
- Chad Griffin, political strategist and LGBTQ rights advocate
- Cliff Harris, football player for the Dallas Cowboys and member of the Pro Football Hall of Fame
- Cecil Ivory, Presbyterian minister and civil rights leader
- Percy Malone, Arkansas politician and pharmacist
- W. Francis McBeth, composer and first Composer Laureate of Arkansas
- Beth Moore, evangelist, author, and Bible teacher
- Terry Nelson, NFL tight end
- Bo Nix, NFL quarterback for the Denver Broncos
- Tommy Patterson, basketball player
- Jim Ranchino, political scientist, consultant, and pollster
- Bob C. Riley, acting governor of Arkansas
- Nick Tennyson, mayor of Durham, North Carolina
- Jerry K. Thomasson, politician
- Kevin Williams, NFL defensive tackle
- Winston P. Wilson, United States Air Force major general and chief of the National Guard Bureau

== See also ==
- List of cities and towns in Arkansas
- National Register of Historic Places listings in Clark County, Arkansas
