= Ebenezer, South Carolina =

Coordinates: 34°57′26″N 81°02′47″W

Ebenezer, Rock Hill
- Neighborhood
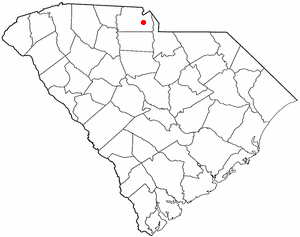
- Country: United States
- State: South Carolina
- County: York

Ebenezer or Ebenezerville is a neighborhood of Rock Hill, South Carolina located at latitude 34.957 and longitude -81.046 along Ebenezer Road in the northern part of the city. Ebenezer was a town in northern York County, South Carolina until it was unincorporated and annexed into the city of Rock Hill in the late 1960s. The elevation of the neighborhood is 686 feet above sea level.

== See also ==
- Boyd Hill, South Carolina
- Newport, South Carolina
- Oakdale, South Carolina
