= Manchester Meadows Soccer Complex =

Soccer facility in South Carolina

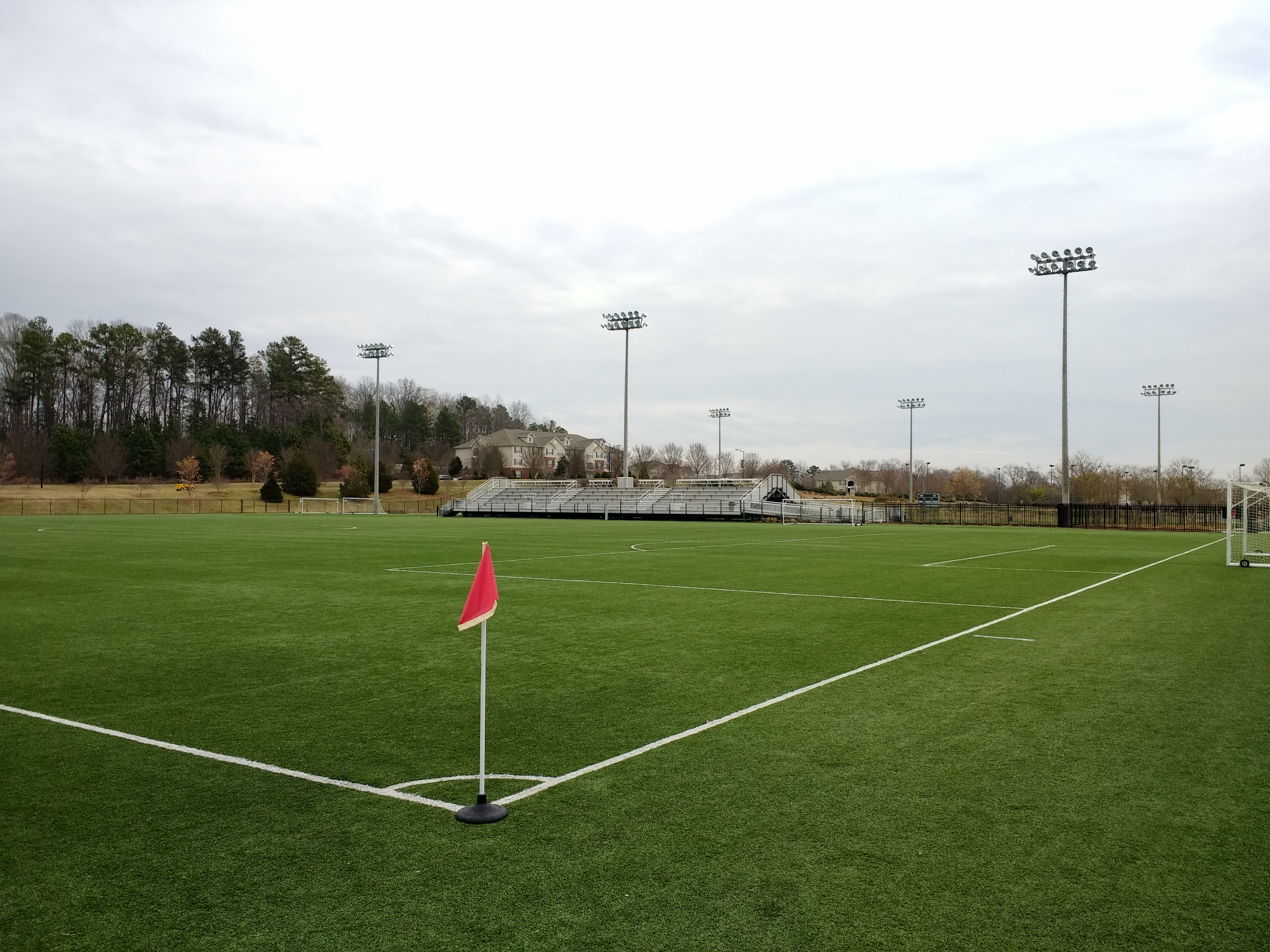
- Interactive map of Manchester Meadows Soccer Complex
- Full name: Manchester Meadows Soccer Complex
- Location: Rock Hill, SC
- Coordinates: 34.94432°N 80.98363°W
- Owner: Rock Hill
- Capacity: 750 (Brannan Field & Carlisle Field)

Construction
- Built: 2006
- Opened: 2006

Tenants
- FC Carolina Discoveries (NPSL) (2014–2017); Independence SC (USL2) (2019–present)

Manchester Meadows Soccer Complex is a multi field soccer complex containing two stadiums located in Rock Hill, South Carolina.

== About ==
The facility encompasses 70 acres of land and contains two synthetic soccer fields with stadium seating, six natural soccer fields, walking trails, a playground, and several pavilions. Manchester Meadows was completed in 2006 and is currently the home of FC Carolina Discoveries, a soccer team in the National Premier Soccer League, and Charlotte Independence II.
