= Elonzo =

Former American independent rock band

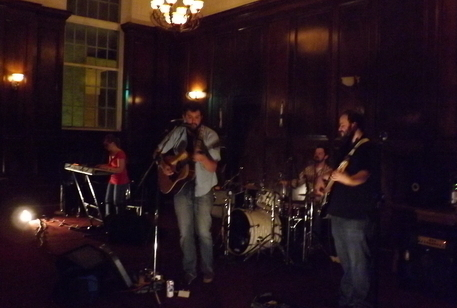
- Elonzo performing at The Courtroom at Gettys in Rock Hill in 2012

Background information
- Origin: Rock Hill, South Carolina United States
- Genres: Rock, Americana, country rock
- Years active: 2008-2015
- Labels: independent
- Members: Jeremy Davis; Maggie Davis-Bourdeau; Steven Narron; Ben Haney
- Website: http://elonzo.bandcamp.com/

Elonzo was an independent rock band based out of Rock Hill, South Carolina area. In the heart of the Carolina Piedmont, they wrote songs about everyday life: sitting around on the front porch, watching the train go by, loss of loved ones, childhood, their hometown and their dreams. Elonzo's music represents some of the most classic elements of the Southeastern United States: earnestness, good story-telling, and an awareness of tragedy that never seems too far around the corner. The band's sound can transform from stripped alt-country to a richer, more expansive vision that reflects the meaningfulness of the ties that bind us together. Mostly, it sounds like rock and roll.

== History ==
Elonzo is a family band- Jeremy Davis and Maggie Bourdeau are brother and sister and the heart of the band. They grew up in Summerville, S.C., in a musical household. “We didn’t really play together, but we both always played music,” Davis says. The siblings formed Elonzo in 2008 along with Maggie's husband, Dan Bourdeau. The band is named after the siblings’ father, who died in 1992. The name was Dan's idea — Davis says using his father's name never crossed his mind. They recorded and released their first album "All My Life" in 2008. Bassist Dennis Contreras was added as they began playing live shows in the region, and in late 2009 they released a four-song ep titled simply "EP". After that the band started working on their second full-length record "A Letter to a Friend", which was released in early 2011 to good reviews from local and regional critics. Contreras left the band and was replaced by Stephen Narron, and they put out a holiday ep titled "Be Released (It's Christmas)" at the end of 2011. Almost all of the tracks on these albums were recorded by Davis in his own house, and all were self-released. Elonzo have become a staple in the South Carolina music scene and are currently recording a third full-length album, tracks from which are being released on the band's website as they are finished. Some reviews have called their brand of rock "hard to pin down" but that's not what's important. As Jeremy Davis says, "We are a rock and roll band. We drink whiskey. We are not a folk band, or a “insert genre” band. We are loud. We want to come to your town, and we love you". In December 2014, bassist Stephen Narron announced to the group that he would be moving to take up a job and would be leaving the band. At this point in the band's history, Maggie only being available part-time due to family, it seemed change was inevitable. With a longing to be able to hit the road to fully support his recorded efforts, Jeremy Davis announced in January 2015 that he would be continuing as a solo artist under the name Elonzo Wesley.

== Band members ==
Current members

Jeremy Davis - vocals, guitar, harmonica
Maggie Davis Bourdeau - piano, vocals
Steven Narron - bass
Ben Haney - drums

Past members

Dennis Contreras - bass
Dan Bourdeau - drums

Session musicians

Justin Parrish - banjo
Anna Bullard - vocals
John Nipe - bells, mellotron, piano
Jason Poore - fiddle
Rodney Lanier - pedal steel
Hadley Eddings - vocals
Gentry Eddings - vocals
Jack Contreras - vocals

== Discography ==
- 2008 All My Life
1. The Train Song
2. About Last Night
3. Super South
4. A Town in the Pines
5. Forty Miles to Asheville
6. Fool's Gold
7. City Song
8. Wine and Love
9. I Am The Son
10. Everyone Remembers
11. All My Life
12. 612 E. White St.
- 2009 EP
1. Sunday Morning
2. Americana Blues
3. Lucinda
4. Say Nothing Do Nothing
- 2011 A Letter to a Friend
1. Chosen One
2. Living Will
3. Fight Fight Fight
4. El Rio
5. Almost Home
6. Cold Cold Heart
7. I Think I Thought
8. Dear Hunter
9. Don't Be Downhearted
10. Not A Promise
- 2011 Be Released (It's Christmas) EP
1. Recession Proof
2. Ghetto Reprise
- 2011 Salt on the Wound. Flesh on the Bone.
1. Reprise
2. Ghost Coast
3. Cannonfire Desire
4. Shiny and New
5. King to Your Queen
6. Graveyard Love
7. Free to Go
8. Here it Comes
9. Blinding Reminder

== Recognitions ==
- Best Live Shows of 2010
- # 3 in South Carolina's Best Albums of 2011
- # 6 in Reader's Choice Best SC Albums of 2011
- Charlotte's Best Albums of 2011
- Releases That Defined Our Region in 2011
