= Oakdale, South Carolina =

Coordinates: 34°52′49″N 81°03′04″W

Oakdale, Rock Hill
- Neighborhood
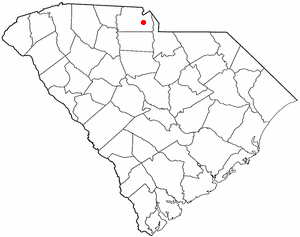
- Country: United States
- State: South Carolina
- County: York
- Incorporated: 1950

Oakdale is a neighborhood of Rock Hill that was annexed into the city in the early 1980s. Oakdale is located at latitude 34.88 and longitude -81.051. The elevation of the neighborhood is 640 feet.

== See also ==
- Ebenezer, South Carolina
- Newport, South Carolina
- Boyd Hill, South Carolina
