= Rock Hill Mall =

- Coordinates: 34.96410°N 80.99722°W
- Opened: 1968-08-21
- Closed: 2006

Rock Hill Mall was an enclosed regional shopping mall located in Rock Hill, South Carolina. It opened in 1968. Most tenants, including all of its retail anchors, left the mall when the newer Rock Hill Galleria opened nearby in 1991. After the closure of the vast majority of the mall in the 1990s, nearly all of it sat vacant and decaying for almost a decade as a dead mall, until it was finally demolished in late 2006.

== History ==
Rock Hill Mall opened for business on August 21, 1968. The mall was fairly well trafficked until the opening of nearby Rock Hill Galleria. When this happened, all of the active anchor tenants immediately left to set up in the Galleria, and Rock Hill Mall's interior closed. The Catawba Nation operated a Bingo hall in one of the former anchors (Sears) through the early 2000s. The mall was demolished in late 2006, making way for a BI-LO supermarket, which became a Publix soon after.
