= Newport, South Carolina =

- CDP
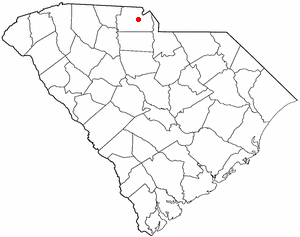
- Location of Newport, South Carolina
- Coordinates: 34°59′20″N 81°06′54″W
- Country: United States
- State: South Carolina
- County: York

Area
  - Total: 8.11 sq mi (21.00 km^{2})
  - Land: 8.05 sq mi (20.85 km^{2})
  - Water: 0.058 sq mi (0.15 km^{2})
- Elevation: 673 ft (205 m)

Population (2020)
  - Total: 4,744
  - Density: 589.4/sq mi (227.55/km^{2})
- Time zone: UTC-5 (Eastern (EST))
  - Summer (DST): UTC-4 (EDT)
- FIPS code: 45-49885
- GNIS feature ID: 2403336

Newport is a census-designated place in York County, South Carolina. Most of Newport is annexed into the city of Rock Hill, while parts are still located in unincorporated York County, but Newport is still considered to be a census-designated place. The census of 2010 showed the population to be 4,136. During the 2000 Census, the population was 4,033.

== Geography ==
According to the United States Census Bureau, the CDP has a total area of 8.9 square miles (23.2 km^{2}), all of is land.

== Demographics ==
Historical population
Census	Pop.	Note	%±
2020	4,744		—
U.S. Decennial Census

=== 2020 census ===
Newport racial composition
Race	Num.	Perc.
White (non-Hispanic)	3,395	71.56%
Black or African American (non-Hispanic)	786	16.57%
Native American	30	0.63%
Asian	74	1.56%
Other/Mixed	226	4.76%
Hispanic or Latino	233	4.91%

As of the 2020 census, Newport had a population of 4,744. The median age was 42.7 years. 21.6% of residents were under the age of 18 and 17.7% were 65 years of age or older. For every 100 females, there were 91.5 males, and for every 100 females age 18 and over, there were 90.0 males.

84.3% of residents lived in urban areas, while 15.7% lived in rural areas.

There were 1,820 households and 1,231 families residing in the CDP. Of households, 30.2% had children under the age of 18 living in them. Of all households, 62.4% were married-couple households, 11.8% were households with a male householder and no spouse or partner present, and 21.4% were households with a female householder and no spouse or partner present. About 20.5% of all households were made up of individuals, and 9.9% had someone living alone who was 65 years of age or older.

There were 1,890 housing units, of which 3.7% were vacant. The homeowner vacancy rate was 0.3% and the rental vacancy rate was 4.1%.

=== 2010 census ===
As of the census of 2010, there were 4,136 people, 1,516 households, and 1,248 families residing in the CDP. The population density was 459.6 inhabitants per square mile (177.5/km^{2}). There were 1,579 housing units at an average density of 175.4 per square mile (67.7/km^{2}). The racial makeup of the CDP was 84.1% White, 11.9% African American, 0.6% Native American, 1.3% Asian, 0.4% from other races, and 1.8% from two or more races. Hispanic or Latino of any race were 2.3% of the population.

There were 1,516 households, out of which 32.3% had children under the age of 18 living with them, 67.9% were married couples living together, 10.2% had a female householder with no husband present, and 17.7% were non-families. 14.5% of all households were made up of individuals, and 5.1% had someone living alone who was 65 years of age or older.

=== 2000 census ===
As of the census of 2000, the population was spread out, with 29.1% under the age of 18, 6.7% from 18 to 24, 31.3% from 25 to 44, 26.2% from 45 to 64, and 6.8% who were 65 years of age or older. The median age was 36 years. For every 100 females, there were 95.5 males. For every 100 females age 18 and over, there were 95.8 males.

The median income for a household in the CDP was $59,564, and the median income for a family was $67,212. Males had a median income of $45,167 versus $27,594 for females. The per capita income for the CDP was $24,237. About 0.7% of families and 1.7% of the population were below the poverty line, including none of those under the age of eighteen or sixty-five or over.

== See also ==
- Oakdale, South Carolina
- Ebenezer, South Carolina
