= Come See Me Festival =

Annual Spring festival in South Carolina

Coordinates: 34.9339°N 81.0201°W

The Come-See-Me festival is an annual Spring festival hosted in Rock Hill, South Carolina.

== About the Festival ==
Awarded the SC Event of the Year, the Come-See-Me Festival offers more than 70 events and activities throughout Rock Hill. It is considered the largest, all-volunteer festival in South Carolina and attracted more than 122,000 participants in 2016. Guests represented 22 states and four countries (Canada, France, Germany and Vietnam). The festival has been ranked in the South's Top 20 Spring Festivals multiple years. Official sponsors of the 2015 Come-See-Me Festival are Carolinas Healthcare System, The City of Rock Hill, Comporium, Rock Hill Coca-Cola Bottling Company, and Williams & Fudge, Inc.

Come-See-Me debuted spring of 1962 as a community project to encourage tourists, relatives and friends to visit Rock Hill during its most beautiful season. Begun as a weekend event, its popularity grew and allowed the festival to expand to its current length of 10 fun-filled days.

The brain-child of C.H. “Icky” Albright, former Rock Hill Mayor and State Senator, Come-See-Me also was nurtured by another Rock Hill resident, the late Vernon Grant, nationally acclaimed illustrator and creator of Kellogg's® celebrated gnomes, “Snap, Crackle and Pop®.” Grant created the Festival's mascot, “Glen the Frog”®, of which Grant designed more than 30 different styles. Each year the festival chair selects a new logo and updates its design and colors.

A central focus of the Festival has always been the historic, award-winning Glencairn Garden, created by Dr. David A. Bigger and given to the City of Rock Hill in 1958. Camellias, dogwoods, wisteria and a variety of flowers and trees surround more than 3,500 azaleas with a cascading lily pond (with live frogs!)

This festival went on hiatus in 2020.

== Highlight activities ==
- Parade
- Road Races - 10K, 5K and Fun Run
- Musical Mania
- Chalk on Main
- Beach Bash
- Glencairn Garden concerts
- Mayor's Frog Jump
- Gourmet Gardens
- Hops at the Park
- Sundaes with Glen and Mother Goose
- Moonlight Jazz & Blues
- Tailgate Party

== Organizers ==
The festival is hosted by the Festival Chair and a committee of team leaders. A Board Of Governors oversees the business aspects of the Festival.

== In popular culture ==
=== Books ===
- UFOs Over Reston (2014), Mentions Rock Hill's "Come See Me Festival" and Glen the Frog.
