= Rock Hill, South Carolina =

Rock Hill
- City
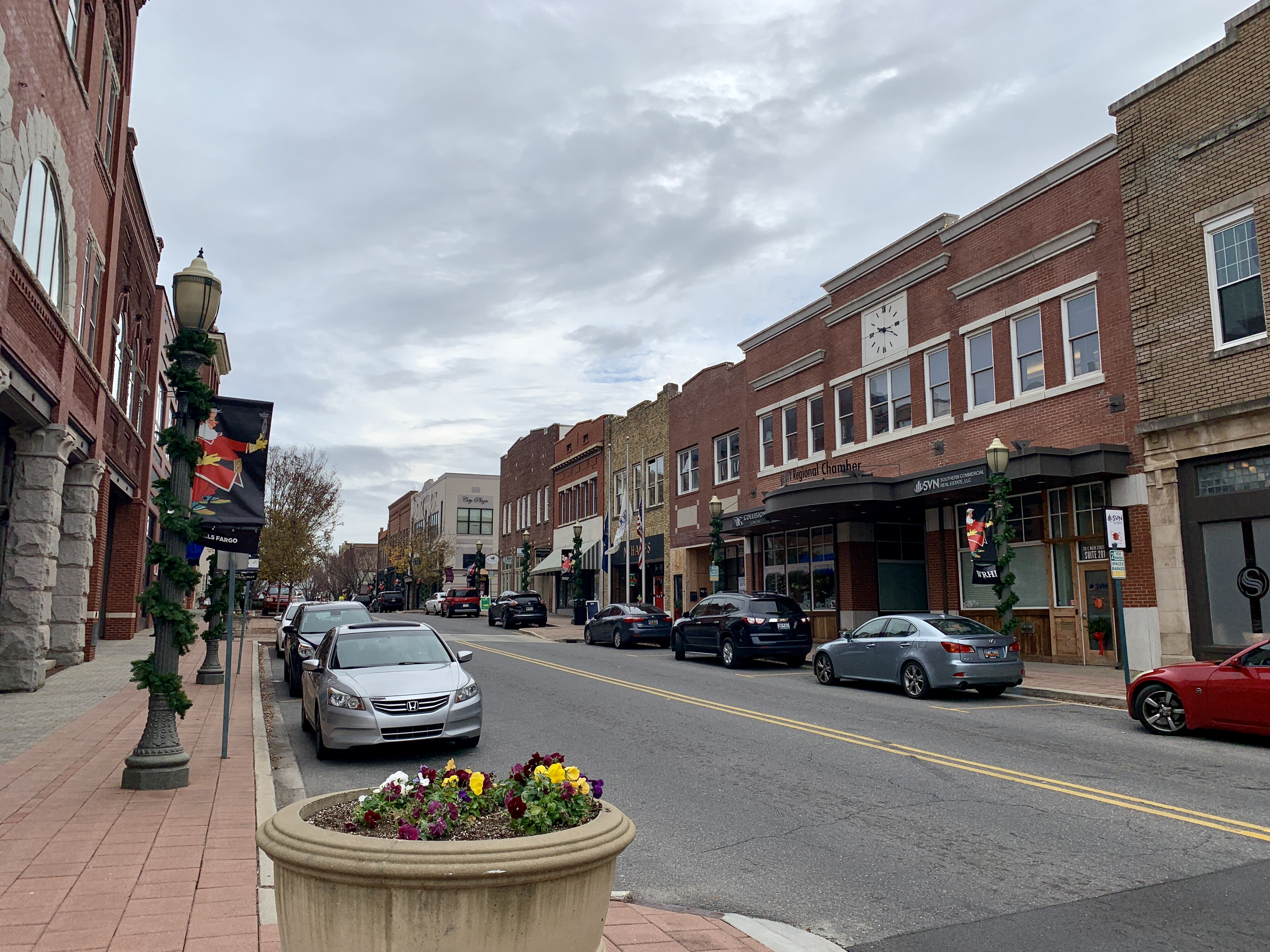
- Downtown Rock Hill

- Flag Seal
- Nicknames: The Gateway to South Carolina, Football City USA
- Motto: "Always On Top."
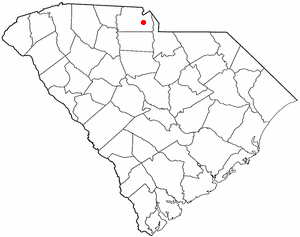
- Location in South Carolina
- Coordinates: 34°56′30″N 81°01′24″W
- Country: United States
- State: South Carolina
- County: York
- Founded: 1852
- Incorporated: 1892
- Named for: A rocky hill encountered by railway builders

Government
  - Type: Council-Manager

Area
  - City: 43.85 sq mi (113.58 km^{2})
  - Land: 43.70 sq mi (113.17 km^{2})
  - Water: 0.16 sq mi (0.41 km^{2}) 0.36%
- Elevation: 620 ft (190 m)

Population (2020)
  - City: 74,372
  - Density: 1,702.1/sq mi (657.19/km^{2})
  - Urban: 218,443 (US: 176th)
  - Urban density: 1,504.9/sq mi (581.0/km^{2})
- Demonym: Rock Hillian
- Time zone: UTC−5 (Eastern)
  - Summer (DST): UTC−4 (Eastern)
- ZIP codes: 29730-29734
- Area codes: 803, 839
- FIPS code: 45-61405
- GNIS feature ID: 2404635
- Website: www.cityofrockhill.com

Rock Hill is the most populous city in York County, South Carolina, United States, and the 5th-most populous city in the state. It is also the 4th-most populous city of the Charlotte metropolitan area, behind Charlotte, Concord, and Gastonia (all located in North Carolina). As of the 2020 census, the city's population was 74,372.

The city is located approximately 25 miles (40 km) south of Charlotte and approximately 70 miles (110 km) north of Columbia.

Rock Hill offers scenic riverfront views along the Catawba River and is home to numerous nature trails, restaurants, and thirty-one parks which are used for both national and local events. Its historic downtown consist of twelve contiguous buildings built as early as 1840 offering dining and retail options. The city is also home to three colleges, including Winthrop University, a public liberal arts university founded in 1886 which enrolls nearly 6,000 students annually.

== History ==
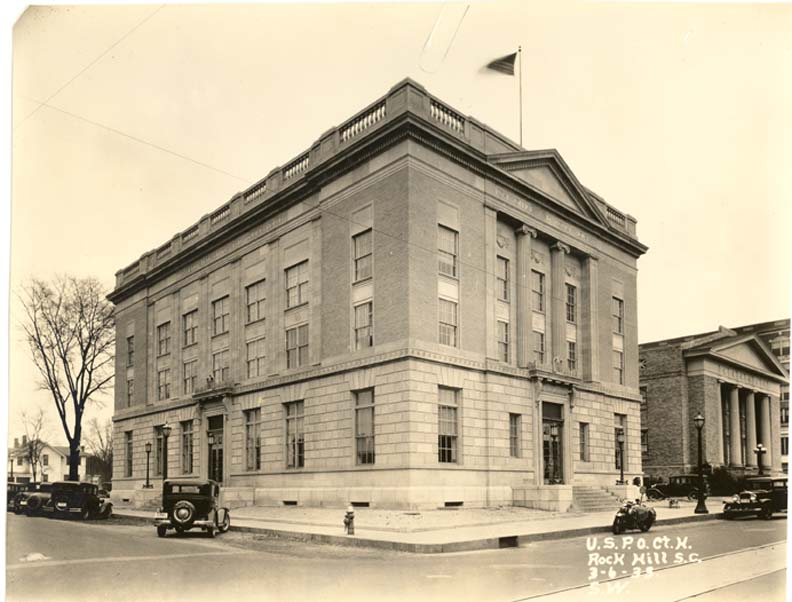
Historic post office in Rock Hill

=== Founding ===
Although some European settlers had already arrived in the Rock Hill area in the 1830s and 1840s, Rock Hill did not become an actual town until the Charlotte and South Carolina Railroad Company made the decision to send a rail line through the area. Originally, the railroad had hoped to build a station in the nearby village of Ebenezerville which was squarely between Charlotte, North Carolina and Columbia, South Carolina. When approached, however, the locals in Ebenezerville refused to have the railroad run through their village since they considered it dirty and noisy. Instead, engineers and surveyors decided to run the line two miles away by a local landmark. According to some, the engineers marked the spot on the map and named it "rocky hill."

Some of Rock Hill's early founding families—the White family, the Black family, and the Moores—believed that having a rail depot so close to them would be advantageous, so they decided to give the Columbia and Charlotte Railroad the right of way through their properties. As they were the three largest landowners in the area, this settled the matter. George Pendleton White contracted with the railroad to build a section of the line. Construction began in 1848. The first passenger train arrived on March 23, 1852. A few weeks later, on April 17, 1852, the first Rock Hill Post Office opened.

Now that Rock Hill had a name, a railroad station, and a post office, it began to draw more settlers to the area. Captain J. H. McGinnis built a small general store near the station in 1849 or 1850 to provide supplies for the construction and railroad workers. Templeton Black, who had leased the land to McGinnis, decided to devote some of his other adjacent land to building a larger town. He hired a local surveyor, Squire John Roddey, to organize a main street. Black sold his first plot of land along that street to Ira Ferguson for $125 a few weeks before the post office opened; other businessmen bought plots quickly after that.

Rock Hill Academy, the first school in Rock Hill, opened in September 1854. Despite its official name, most residents referred to it as the Pine Grove Academy after the pine grove it was located in. Ann Hutchinson White, wife of George White, donated the land to the school after her husband's death. The school had 60 male pupils in 1856; a school for girls was later opened in the same place.

Prior to 1857, the Indian Land Chronicle was Rock Hill's first newspaper. It was renamed The Rock Hill Chronicle in 1860. Prior to 1860, Rock Hill had at least two doctors.

=== American Civil War ===
Shortly before the American Civil War began, a census had been taken of the population in York County where Rock Hill is located. Half of the district's 21,800 residents were enslaved people, integral to local cotton production. The 4,379 white males in the county formed fourteen infantry companies; some of the men joined cavalry or artillery units instead. By the end of the war, 805 of these men had died, and hundreds more were wounded. Men from Rock Hill and York County were involved in many of the major Civil War battles.

Due to its position on the railroad, Rock Hill became a transfer point for Confederate soldiers and supplies moving to and from the front. Since there was no local hospital, townspeople nursed sick and wounded soldiers in their homes. Refugees fleeing the coastal blockade or General Sherman's troops, also came to Rock Hill.

Beginning in the spring of 1862, local area farmers switched from cotton to corn in order to produce more food. Records show that prices in Rock Hill changed frequently during the war, reflecting both shortages and the inflation of the Confederate paper money.

Confederate General P. G. T. Beauregard set up a temporary headquarters in Rock Hill on February 21, 1865. He ordered the roads to Charlotte blocked to try to prevent General Sherman from reaching the city; Sherman ultimately went in a different direction.

When General Lee surrendered at the Appomattox Court House, it was actually a future Rock Hill resident who was responsible for waving the white flag. Captain Robert Moorman Sims, a farmer from Lancaster County, was sent by General James Longstreet to inform Union troops that the Confederate troops wanted a truce.

=== Post-Civil War ===
The Civil War changed the social, economic, and political situation in Rock Hill tremendously, as it did elsewhere in the South. Rock Hill grew as a town, taking in war refugees, widows and their families, and the return of the men who had left to fight in the war. The formerly wealthy elite sold off their land to stay afloat financially. Town life would begin to become more important than rural life.

Most of the merchants in Rock Hill around 1870 were former Confederate soldiers; many were entrepreneurs who were new to town, trying to start over. In 1870, even the largest stores in Rock Hill were only one story tall, and there were no sidewalks along the roads. The first drug store in Rock Hill opened in the 1870s.

=== Incorporation ===
The town was not officially incorporated until 1870, on the third try.

The first attempt to get Rock Hill incorporated was made in 1855. A petition, signed by major landholders and businessmen from the Rock Hill area, was presented to the General Assembly on October 19, 1855. No action on the matter was taken by the General Assembly.

The second attempt was in 1868. In their petition, the townspeople claimed that Rock Hill had over 300 residents, "eleven stores, two churches, two bars, two hotels, two carriage shops, three blacksmith shops, three shoe shops, one tannery, one cabinet shop, and elementary schools for white girls and boys." The petition was signed by 48 men, most relative newcomers to Rock Hill, with only a few members of the old, established, landed families. The larger landholders opposed incorporation because of the taxes it would bring. They filed a counter-proposal which claimed that there were only 100 residents, many of them temporary. The situation was a strong indication of the changes Rock Hill experienced as it transitioned from mostly farms to a business community. Ultimately, the state legislature did not act on either petition and Rock Hill was still not incorporated.

The third, successful petition was made in 1869, only one year after 1868's failed petition. This time there were 57 signers in favor of incorporation, with only seven opponents. The opponents collectively owned 80% of the land that would be incorporated into Rock Hill if the petition was successful. They were unsuccessful at preventing incorporation this time; Rock Hill was officially incorporated on February 26, 1870.

=== Civil rights movement ===
Rock Hill was the setting for two significant events in the civil rights movement. In February 1961, nine African-American men went to jail at the York County prison farm after staging a sit-in at a segregated McCrory's lunch counter in downtown Rock Hill. The current location is now known as "Kounter" which has the names of the activists engraved. Their offense was reported to be "refusing to stop singing hymns during their morning devotions." The event gained nationwide attention as the men followed an untried strategy called "jail, no bail." Rejecting bail was a way to lessen the huge financial burden which civil rights groups were facing as the sit-in movement spread across the South. As their actions gained widespread national news coverage, the tactic was adopted by other civil rights groups. The men became known as the Friendship Nine because eight of the nine men were students at Rock Hill's Friendship Junior College.

Later in 1961, Rock Hill was the first stop in the Deep South for a group of 13 Freedom Riders, who boarded buses in Washington, DC, and headed South to test the 1960 ruling by the U.S. Supreme Court outlawing racial segregation in all interstate public facilities. When the civil rights leader John Lewis and another black man stepped off the bus at Rock Hill, they were beaten by a white mob that was uncontrolled by police. The event drew national attention.

In 2002, Lewis, by then a US Congressman from Georgia, returned to Rock Hill, where he had been invited as a speaker at Winthrop University and was given the key to the city. On January 21, 2008, Rep. Lewis returned to Rock Hill again and spoke at the city's Martin Luther King Jr. Day observance. Mayor Doug Echols officially apologized to him on the city's behalf for the Freedom Riders' treatment in the city.

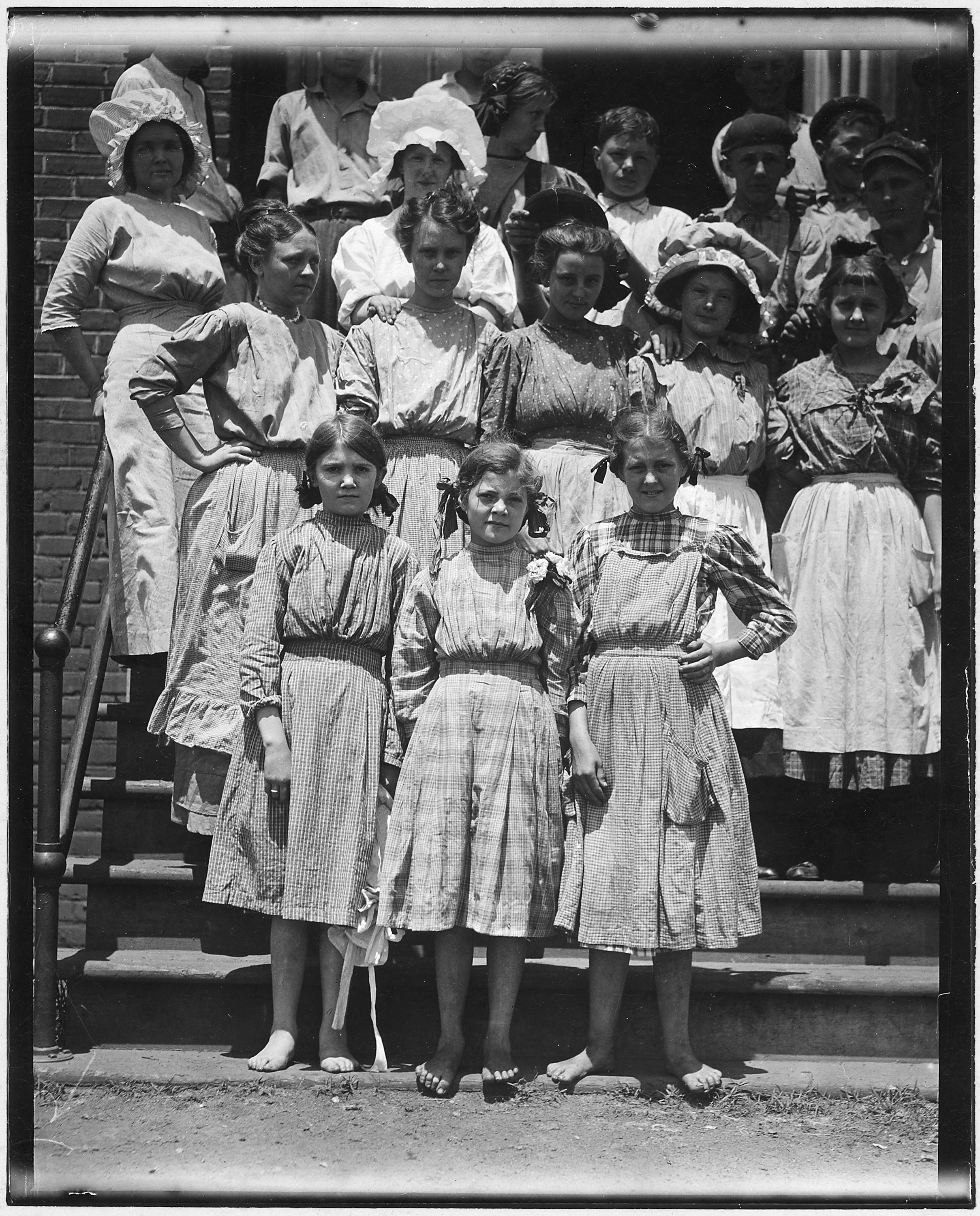
Child laborers at Aragon Mill in Rock Hill, 1912. Photo by Lewis Hine.

=== 20th century to present ===
Rock Hill experienced steady growth in the twentieth century. The city boundary expanded far beyond its original limits. Four unincorporated communities of York County were annexed into the city including Boyd Hill in the late 1940s, Ebenezer and Mexico in the 1960s, and Oakdale in the 1980s.

Rock Hill celebrated its centennial in 1952 and its sesquicentennial in 2002.

Rock Hill hosted the 2017 UCI BMX World Championships at the Rock Hill BMX Supercross Track in Riverwalk with an estimated direct economic impact of $19.2 million.

On April 7, 2021, former NFL player Phillip Adams shot and killed six people, including two children, at a house in Rock Hill. He committed suicide the next day.

== Geography ==
Interactive map of Rock Hill

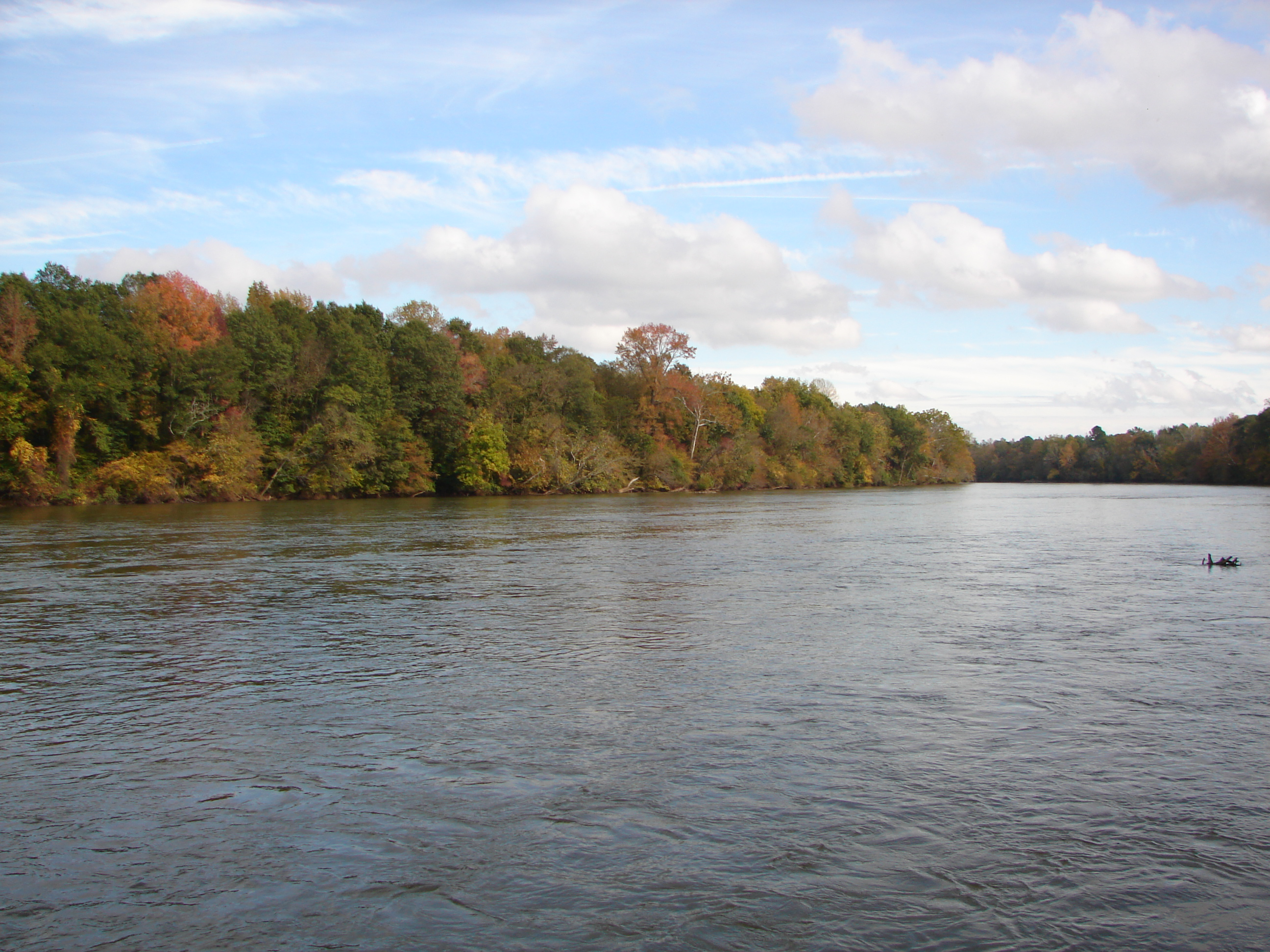
A view of the Catawba River at River Park

According to the United States Census Bureau, the city has a total area of 43.85 square miles (113.6 km^{2}), of which 43.69 square miles (113.2 km^{2}) is land and 0.16 square miles (0.41 km^{2}) (0.36%) is water.

Rock Hill is located along the Catawba River in the north-central section of the Piedmont of South Carolina, south of the city of Charlotte in North Carolina. The city sits at an elevation of around 676 feet (206 m) above sea level. It is located approximately 150 miles (240 km) from the Atlantic Ocean and 75 miles (121 km) from the Blue Ridge Mountains. The northern limits of the city reside along Lake Wylie, a large man-made reservoir.

=== Neighborhoods ===
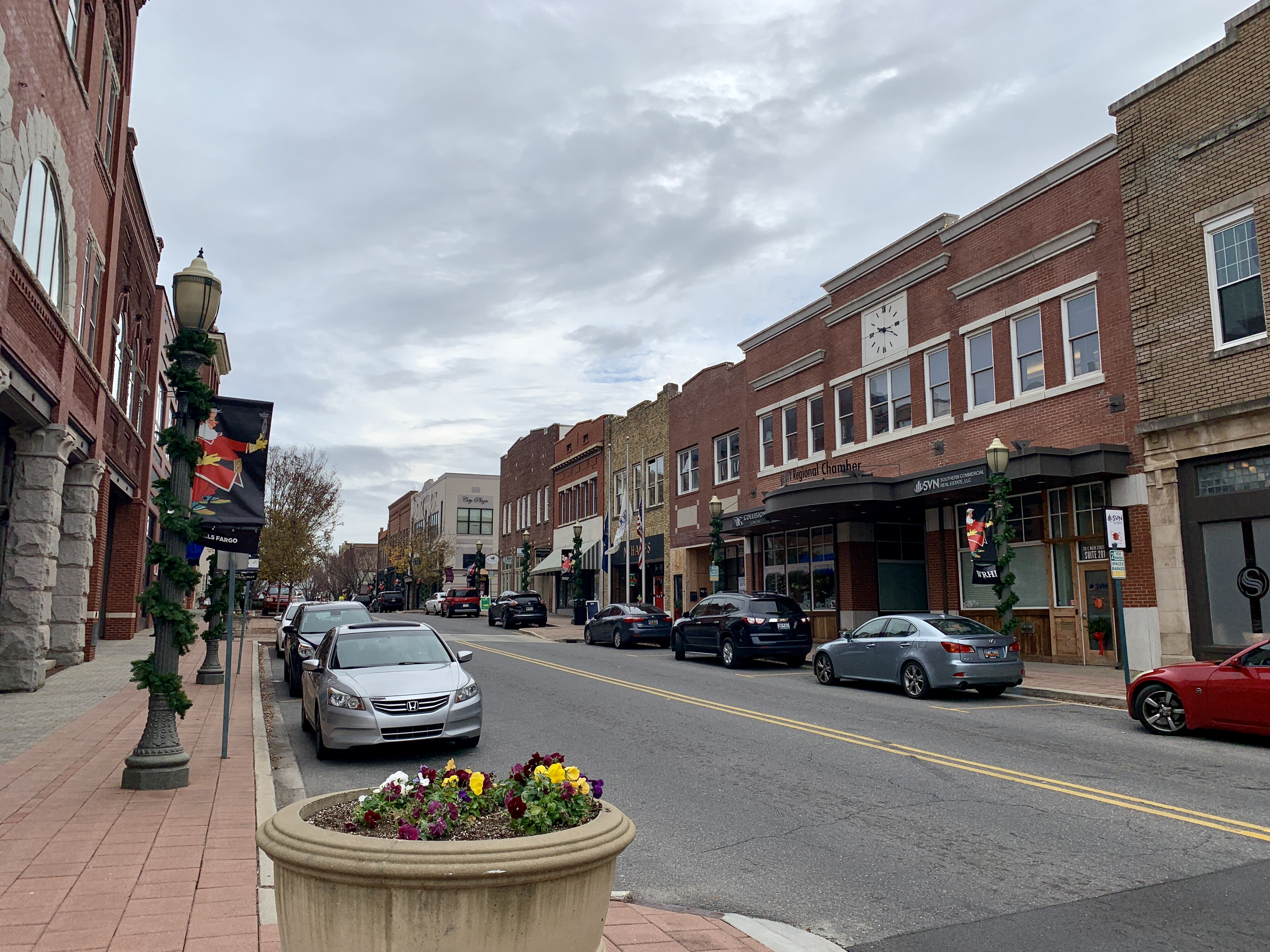
Downtown Rock Hill

Rock Hill consists of numerous neighborhoods, some of which were independent towns and communities at one time that were later annexed into Rock Hill city limits.

- Downtown, the city's central business district that is home to twelve contiguous buildings built as early as 1870. It is also home to the city's government offices and numerous restaurants.
- Ebenezer, located north of downtown along Ebenezer Road. This area is home to Piedmont Medical Network as well as both newly developed subdivisions and historic neighborhoods.
- Oakdale, southern city limits located south of downtown and bordered by S.C. Highway 901 to the north and east. The area is home to South Pointe High School and the Rock Hill Country Club golf course.
- Newport, while still considered to be a census-designated place, has been mostly annexed into the city. This fast-growing area with numerous subdivisions is home to the Rock Hill Aquatic Center and located northwest of Ebenezer along S.C. Highway 161.
- Boyd Hill, historic neighborhood bordered by downtown to the south, Ebenezer to the north and S.C. Highway 901 to the west. While the neighborhood is often considered a low-income portion of the city, it is also home to the city's municipal football and soccer stadium.

=== Natural disasters ===
Four notable major natural disasters have struck the city since 1926.

==== 1926 Rock Hill tornado ====
On November 26, 1926, a destructive tornado struck downtown Rock Hill. It was the day after Thanksgiving, late in the season for such a violent storm. The "black as ink twister" took less than 10 minutes to change the face of the business section. The storm touched down in western York County, and entered Rock Hill from the west. Once in the town, the twister cut a path about three blocks wide, leaving 60 homes heavily damaged, the hospital roof removed, and cars flipped or crushed. By the end, the total damage for the whole town was $150,000. The tornado was responsible for one death and 12 injuries within Rock Hill.

==== Hurricane Hugo ====
Hurricane Hugo struck the city on the morning of September 22, 1989. The storm ripped through the city with sustained winds over 90 miles per hour (140 km/h), toppling massive oak and pine trees. Schools were closed for weeks because of widespread damage to roads and facilities. The total damage cost for the entire state of South Carolina was around $4.2 billion. The storm was a category 3 when it entered the county and was a category 2 as it left the county.

==== The "Great Carolina Snowstorm" of 2004 ====
A complex series of low pressure systems moved across South Carolina from February 25–27 of 2004. Starting as a mix of snow and sleet, the storm became all snow as the low pulled off the Carolina coast. Cold arctic air settled over the Carolinas and dumped 22 inches (56 cm) of snow, with lightning, gusty winds, and some areas getting up to 28 inches (71 cm). Sustained winds over 40 miles per hour (64 km/h) across Rock Hill knocked out power, resulting in schools' closing for a week. It was the worst overall blizzard to hit the area.

==== 2011 Rock Hill Tornado ====
During the Tornado outbreak of November 14–16, 2011, a deadly EF-2 tornado struck about 8 miles (13 km) south and 5 miles (8.0 km) southwest of Rock Hill that travelled for 2 miles (3.2 km) after touchdown. The storm, which left a 200 yards (180 m) wide path of destruction and had wind speeds of up to 135 miles per hour (217 km/h), left 3 people dead, caused 5 injuries, and 7-8 damaged homes. This event caused the first ever tornado related deaths to be recorded in York Country history.

=== Climate ===
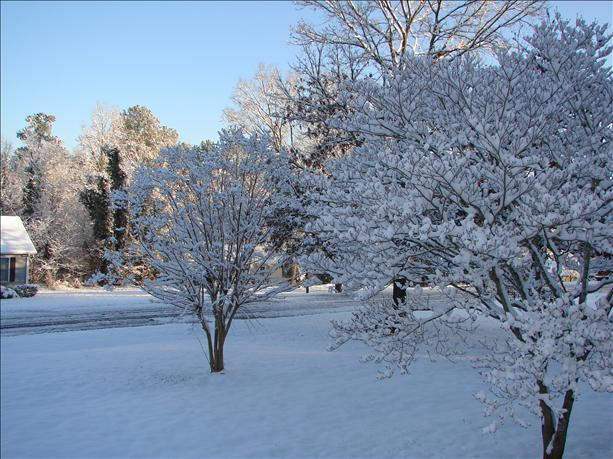
Snow in Rock Hill

Rock Hill has a humid subtropical climate with four distinct seasons, characterized by hot humid summers and cool dry winters. The city itself is part of the USDA hardiness zone 7b with yearly minimum low temperature extremes between 5 and 10 °F (−15 and −12 °C), typically occurring in the month of January. Precipitation does not vary greatly between seasons, but is highly dependent on moisture supplied from the Gulf of Mexico. July is the hottest month, with an average high temperature of 91 °F (33 °C) and an average low temperature of 71 °F (22 °C). The coldest month of the year is January, when the average high temperature is 51 °F (11 °C) and the average low temperature is 31 °F (−1 °C). The warmest temperature ever recorded in the city was 106 °F (41 °C) in 1983 and tied in 2007. The coldest temperature ever recorded in the city was −4 °F (−20 °C) in 1985.

Climate data for Rock Hill, South Carolina (Winthrop University) 1991–2020 normals, extremes 1899–present
Month	Jan	Feb	Mar	Apr	May	Jun	Jul	Aug	Sep	Oct	Nov	Dec	Year
Record high °F (°C)	80 (27)	83 (28)	90 (32)	96 (36)	100 (38)	105 (41)	108 (42)	106 (41)	106 (41)	98 (37)	86 (30)	81 (27)	108 (42)
Mean daily maximum °F (°C)	53.5 (11.9)	57.8 (14.3)	65.5 (18.6)	74.8 (23.8)	81.2 (27.3)	87.6 (30.9)	90.7 (32.6)	89.0 (31.7)	83.5 (28.6)	74.0 (23.3)	63.8 (17.7)	55.6 (13.1)	73.1 (22.8)
Daily mean °F (°C)	43.0 (6.1)	46.4 (8.0)	53.5 (11.9)	62.3 (16.8)	69.9 (21.1)	77.0 (25.0)	80.2 (26.8)	78.9 (26.1)	73.3 (22.9)	62.6 (17.0)	52.3 (11.3)	45.4 (7.4)	62.1 (16.7)
Mean daily minimum °F (°C)	32.6 (0.3)	35.0 (1.7)	41.6 (5.3)	49.9 (9.9)	58.6 (14.8)	66.5 (19.2)	69.7 (20.9)	68.9 (20.5)	63.0 (17.2)	51.2 (10.7)	40.9 (4.9)	35.2 (1.8)	51.1 (10.6)
Record low °F (°C)	−4 (−20)	5 (−15)	4 (−16)	20 (−7)	34 (1)	40 (4)	50 (10)	49 (9)	38 (3)	25 (−4)	12 (−11)	2 (−17)	−4 (−20)
Average precipitation inches (mm)	3.58 (91)	3.12 (79)	3.90 (99)	3.73 (95)	3.53 (90)	4.11 (104)	3.57 (91)	3.72 (94)	3.56 (90)	2.94 (75)	3.28 (83)	3.58 (91)	42.62 (1,083)
Average precipitation days (≥ 0.01 in)	9.9	9.4	10.1	8.7	8.4	9.3	9.1	9.2	6.6	6.8	7.7	9.2	104.4
Source: NOAA

== Demographics ==
Historical population
Census	Pop.	Note	%±
1880	809		—
1890	2,744		239.2%
1900	5,485		99.9%
1910	7,216		31.6%
1920	8,809		22.1%
1930	11,322		28.5%
1940	15,009		32.6%
1950	24,502		63.2%
1960	29,404		20.0%
1970	33,846		15.1%
1980	35,327		4.4%
1990	41,643		17.9%
2000	49,765		19.5%
2010	66,154		32.9%
2020	74,372		12.4%
2025 (est.)	75,911	▲	2.1%
U.S. Decennial Census

=== 2020 census ===
As of the 2020 census, Rock Hill had 74,372 people, 30,225 households, and 18,379 families. The median age was 35.8 years; 22.1% of residents were under the age of 18 and 14.9% were 65 years of age or older. For every 100 females there were 86.7 males, and for every 100 females age 18 and over there were 82.0 males.

99.4% of residents lived in urban areas, while 0.6% lived in rural areas.

There were 30,225 households in Rock Hill, of which 30.0% had children under the age of 18 living in them. Of all households, 36.6% were married-couple households, 19.8% were households with a male householder and no spouse or partner present, and 36.6% were households with a female householder and no spouse or partner present. About 32.1% of all households were made up of individuals and 11.4% had someone living alone who was 65 years of age or older.

There were 32,675 housing units, of which 7.5% were vacant. The homeowner vacancy rate was 1.3% and the rental vacancy rate was 7.7%.

Racial composition as of the 2020 census
Race	Number	Percent
White	36,204	48.7%
Black or African American	28,830	38.8%
American Indian and Alaska Native	434	0.6%
Asian	1,499	2.0%
Native Hawaiian and Other Pacific Islander	60	0.1%
Some other race	2,937	3.9%
Two or more races	4,408	5.9%
Hispanic or Latino (of any race)	5,757	7.7%

=== 2010 census ===
At the 2010 census, there were 66,154 people and 16,059 families residing in the city. The population density was 619.2 people/km^{2} (1,604 people/mi^{2}). There were 29,159 housing units at an average density of 252.4 units per square kilometre (654 units/mi^{2}). The racial makeup of the city was 54.6% White, 38.3% Black, 1.7% Asian, 0.5% Native American, 0.1% Pacific Islander, 2.7% from other races, and 2.1% from two or more races. Hispanic or Latino of any race were 5.7% of the population.

There were 25,966 households, out of which 29.9% had children under the age of 18 living with them, 38.1% were married couples living together, 18.8% had a female householder with no husband present, and 38.2% were non-families. 30.3% of all households were made up of individuals, and 8.6% had someone living alone who was 65 years of age or older. The average household size was 2.43 and the average family size was 3.04.

In the city, the population was spread out, w ith 24.4% under the age of 18, 14.7% from 18 to 24, 28.5% from 25 to 44, 22.0% from 45 to 64, and 10.4% who were 65 years of age or older. The median age was 31.9 years. For every 100 females, there were 85.3 males. For every 100 females age 18 and over, there were 80.3 males.

== Economy ==
Top 10 Largest Employers
3D Systems
Amida Industries, INC.
Carolina Energy
City of Rock Hill
Comporium Communications
Cytec Carbon Filters, LLC.
Hyosung Corporation
Langer Transport Corporation
Rock Hill Schools
Winthrop University

Rock Hill's economy was once dominated by the textile industry, and the restructuring of that industry in moving jobs overseas caused a decline in the local economy at one time. Over the past decade, Rock Hill has transitioned to a relatively strong manufacturing workforce.

Other major companies in Rock Hill with headquarters or North American headquarters include Hyosung, Comporium Communications, 3D Systems, and Atlas Copco.

The median income for a household in the city was $37,336, and the median income for a family was $45,697. Males had a median income of $32,156 versus $24,181 for females. The per capita income for the city was $18,929. About 9.7% of families and 14.0% of the population were below the poverty line, including 16.2% of those under age 18 and 12.0% of those age 65 or over. The unemployment rate of the city was 8.7 percent and 11,874 of the 71,459 residents lived and worked in the city with a daytime population change of +5,208 as of March 2011. The city is transitioning to a retail and manufacturing economy, and has been working to attract national and global companies.

Rock Hill Galleria is a regional shopping mall founded in 1991. Rock Hill Mall (1968–c. 1993, demolished 2006), and Town Center Mall (1975–1993) are former major shopping centers inside the city.

== Arts and culture ==
Rock Hill's Historic Old Town area is home to many of the city's historic buildings, art galleries, history museums, and cultural events.

=== Seasonal events ===
- Blues and Jazz Festival – a music festival celebrating the roots of modern music.
- ChristmasVille – an annual holiday festival
- Come See Me Festival – an annual salute to spring.
- Don't Sweat It Fest – a festival that celebrates local music, community, and summer fun.
- Rock Hill Pride Festival – an annual grassroots celebration of LGBTQ+ culture. Hosted and funded by local businesses.
- Underexposed Film Festival YC – an international, independent short film festival.
- South Carolina Ag + Art Tour – a free, self-guided tour of farms and markets featuring local artisans. Originally started in York County, it has since grown to include a total of 20 South Carolina counties.

=== Visual and performing arts ===
Rock Hill has an active visual arts and performing arts scene that is primarily sustained by its local artists and arts nonprofit organizations.

==== Art galleries and venues ====
- Center for the Arts – home to the Arts Council of York County, art galleries, and local artist studios.
- Tom S. Gettys Center for the Arts – the historic U.S. Post Office and Courthouse which has been repurposed to include artist studios, galleries, the Rock Hill Pottery Center, and a performing arts space in the building's original courtroom space.

==== Public art installations ====
- Mural Mile – a recent initiative involving the creation of multiple murals throughout the Old Town area, including one painted in 2021 by South Carolina artist Shepard Fairey, who grew up spending time with family in the city and surrounding area.
- Freedom Walkway – An alleyway installation honoring local heroes for justice and equality.

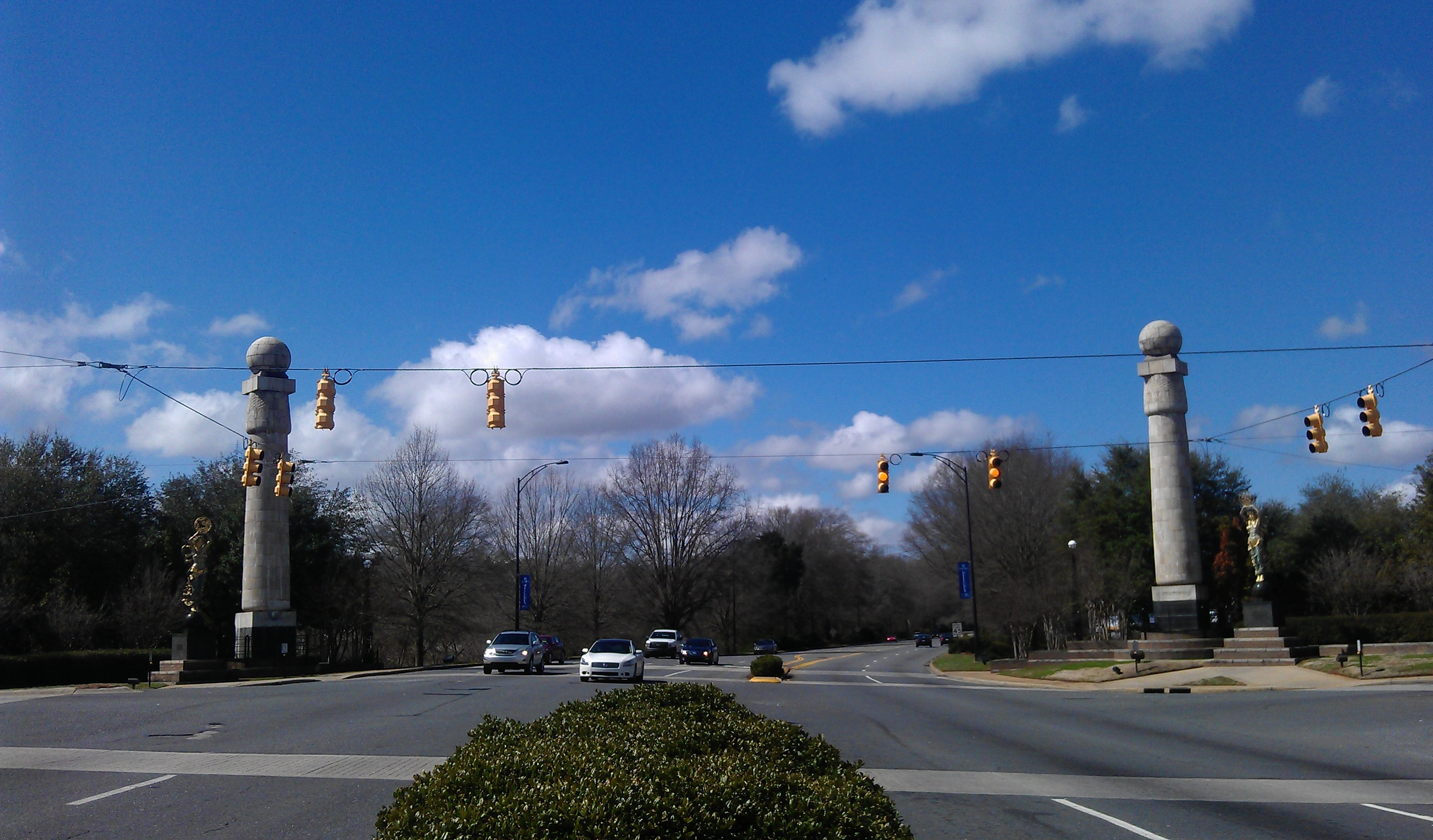
Columns at the gateway intersection

- Four civitas and the gateway were installed in 1991. Each holds a disc that symbolizes the four features of the city's economy: gears of industry, flames of knowledge, stars of inspiration, and bolts of energy. The ribbons in the civitates clothing and hair transform into wings, inferring the textile industry as the foundation of the city's growth. The 22-foot-tall (6.7 m) Civitas statues were made of bronze by sculptor Audrey Flack. In 1992, a fifth civitas statue by Flack was placed at City Hall. The 60-foot-tall (18 m) columns that form the gateway came an Egyptian Revival Masonic Temple in Charlotte, North Carolina. They were gifted to the city by the First Union Corporation.

=== Museums ===
- Museum of York County is a natural history museum.
- Comporium Telephone Museum features the history of technology in Rock Hill.
- Rock Hill Fire Museum features the history of the Rock Hill Fire Department.
- Main Street Children's Museum features children's learning and educational activities.
- White Home is a historic site and museum.

=== Library ===
Rock Hill has a public library, a branch of the York County Library.

=== Music ===
Rock Hill is home to indie rock band Elonzo.

== Sports ==
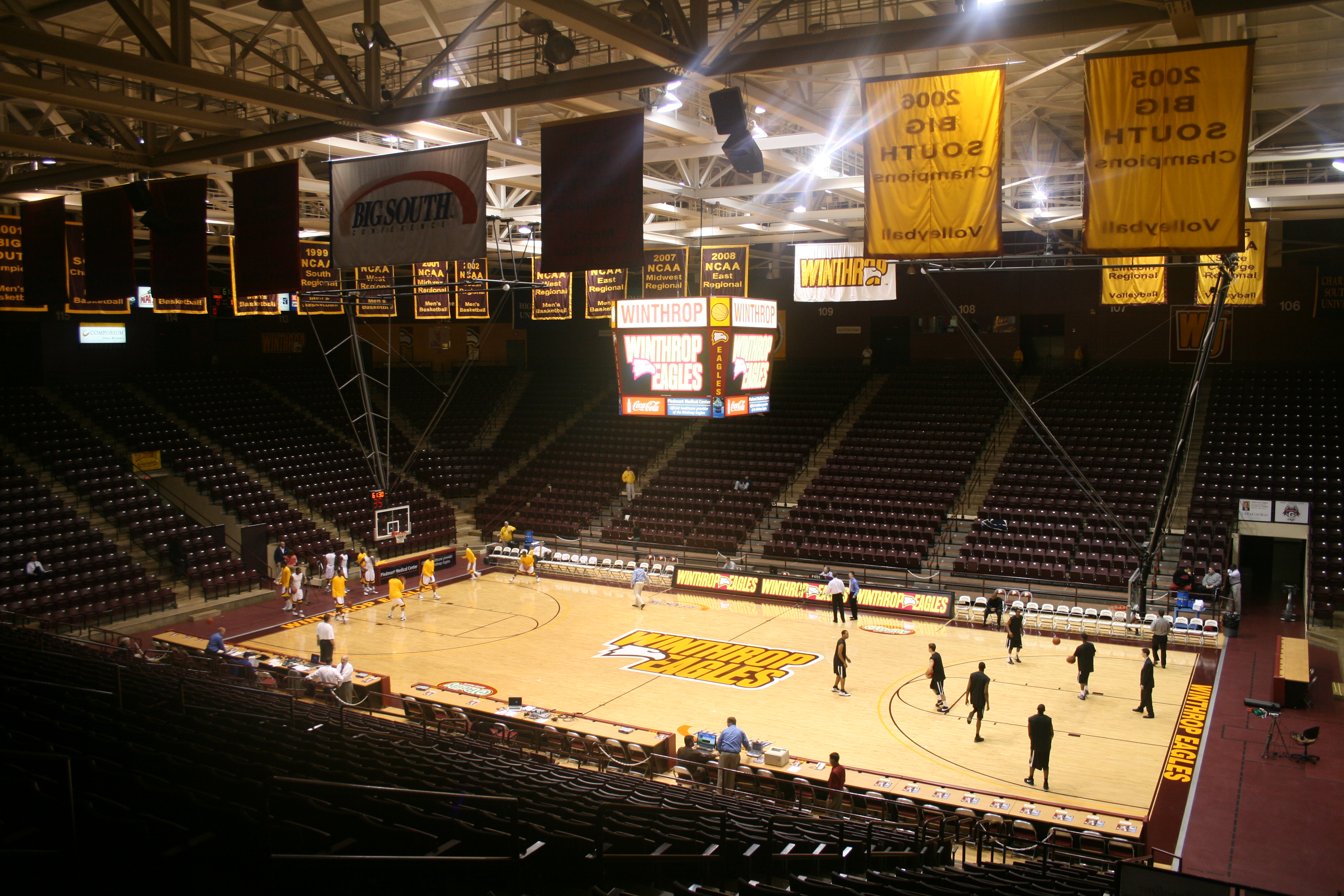
Basketball practice at Winthrop Coliseum

Rock Hill has nicknamed itself "Football City USA" because of its prolific production of NFL players. The city claims to produce more NFL players per capita than any city in the United States. In 2019, Rock Hill was selected as the site for the Carolina Panthers' 200-acre (81 ha) training facility. In 2022, the deal was called off.

Rock Hill hosts two national championships, the United States Disc Golf Championship at Winthrop University, and the US Youth Soccer National Championships at Manchester Meadows Soccer Complex.

Rock Hill hosted the 2015 IQA World Cup, making it the second consecutive year South Carolina hosted the Quidditch World Cup.

Rock Hill hosted the 2017 UCI BMX World Championships in July 2017 at the Riverwalk mixed-use community along the Catawba River.

Collegiate sports include the Winthrop University Eagles, a National Collegiate Athletic Association (NCAA) Division I program.

The Rock Hill Cardinals, from 1963 to 1968, were a Western Carolinas League baseball team affiliated with the St. Louis Cardinals.

As of 2022, ESPN8 The Ocho’s primary venues are in Rock Hill, at the Rock Hill Sports and Event Center and Manchester Meadows Soccer Complex.

== Parks and recreation ==
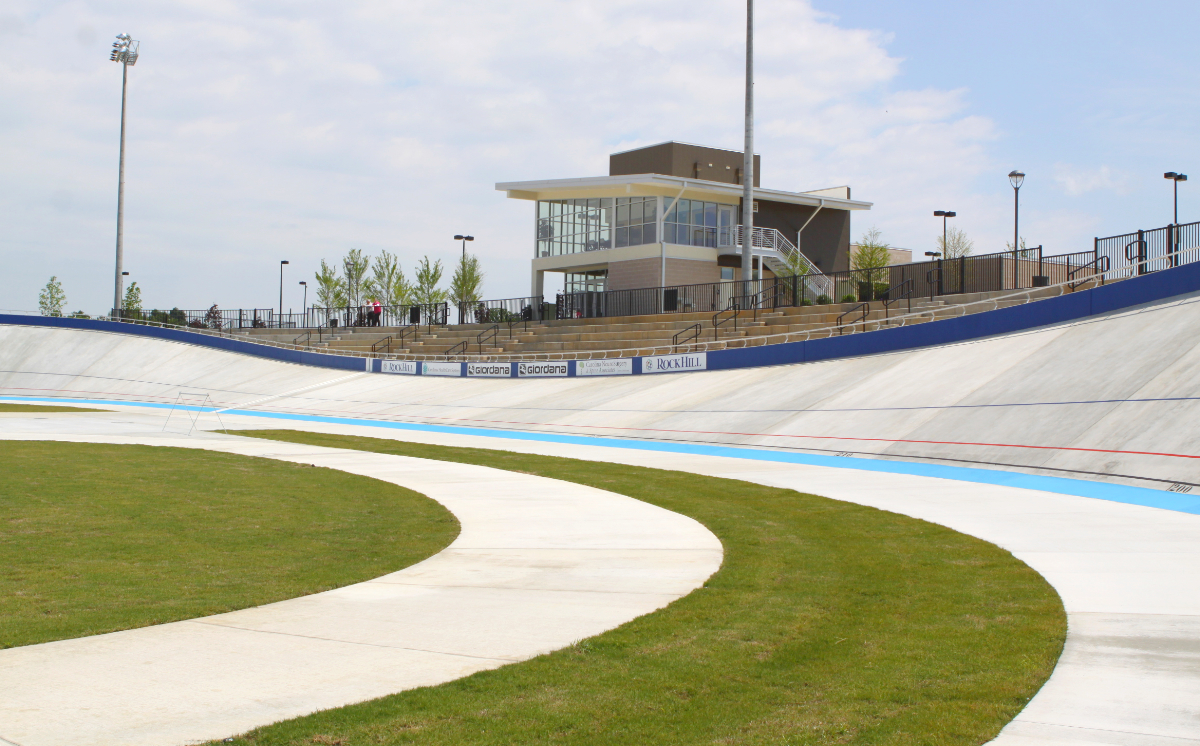
Velodrome

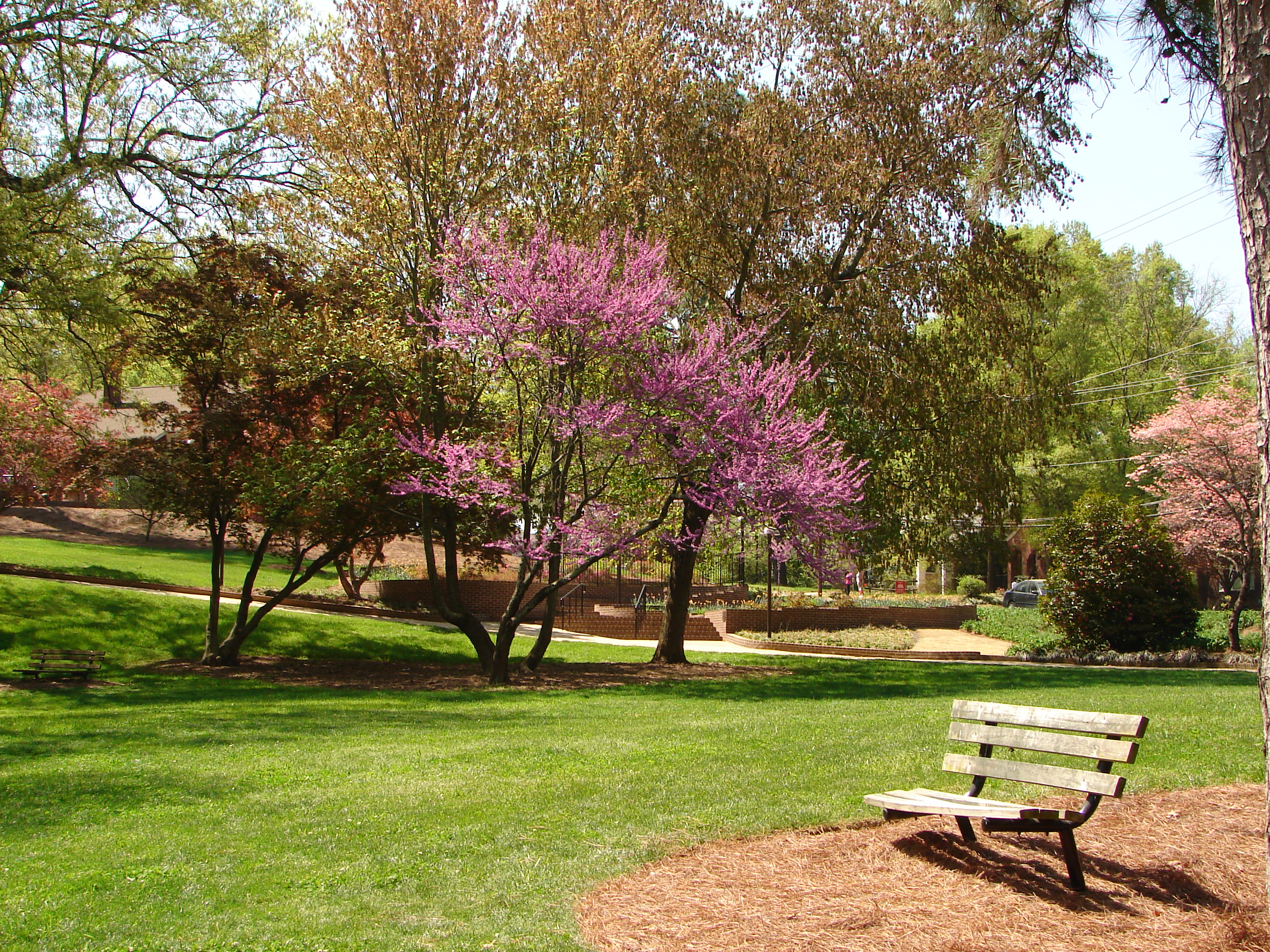
Glencairn Garden

Parks include in the city:

- Cherry Park, 70-acre (28 ha) park with a 1.5 mi (2.4 km) trail and athletic fields.
- Ebenezer Park, beachfront park located along Lake Wylie with swimming and picnic areas.
- Glencairn Garden, quaint botanical garden featuring a variety of blooming flowers and trees.
- Manchester Meadows, large park with covered picnic areas and soccer fields.
- Riverwalk and Rock Hill Outdoor Center, 1,000-acre (400 ha) mixed-use community park with kayaking, hiking, and mountain biking. The Giordana Velodrome and Rock Hill BMX Supercross track are located here.
- Westminster Park, riverside park with access to Catawba River.

== Government ==
The city operates under a Council-Manager form of government. The governing body is composed of a mayor and six members. The mayor is determined through a nonpartisan, at-large election for a four-year term of office while council members are chosen through nonpartisan, single-member district elections. Council members are elected to staggered four-year terms of office. The city council is a legislative body, establishing policies with recommendations from the city administrator. The city manager acts as the chief administrator of the council's policies implemented through the administrative control of city departments given to him by ordinance. John Gettys is mayor; his term began January 2018.

== Education ==
=== K–12 ===
Public education in Rock Hill is administered by York County School District 3. The district operates twenty-seven schools in the city, including nineteen elementary schools, five middle schools, and three high schools. The district has a student enrollment of around 25,000.

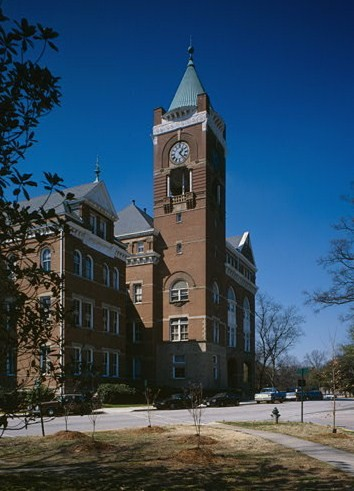
Tillman Hall at Winthrop University in Rock Hill

==== High schools ====
- Rock Hill High School (first built high school in the city)
- Northwestern (built at the time of school integration in 1970, replacing all-black Emmett Scott High School)
- South Pointe (the newest high school in the city)

==== Middle schools ====
- Saluda Trail Middle School
- Castle Heights Middle School
- Sullivan Middle School
- Rawlinson Road Middle School
- Dutchman Creek Middle School
- Westminster Catawba Christian School

=== Private schools ===
A variety of religious schools serve the city of Rock Hill, including St. Anne's Catholic School and Westminster Catawba. The city is also home to two Charter schools: York Preparatory Academy, and Legion Collegiate Academy.

=== Higher education ===
Scholars Walk at Winthrop University

There are three colleges in Rock Hill.

The most prominent institution is Winthrop University, founded in 1886 as a women's college. It is a thriving, public, co-ed four-year comprehensive university with an annual enrollment of about 6,000 students.

Clinton College is an HBCU founded by the African Methodist Episcopal Zion Church in 1894. Initially a two-year institution, the liberal arts college added four-year degree programs in 2013 in addition to the associate degree programs.

York Technical College opened in Rock Hill in 1964. This two-year community college offers associate degrees and provides continuing education for approximately 9,000 area residents annually and is growing each year.

== Media ==
Rock Hill is home to a daily newspaper, The Herald, which covers the area. Rock Hill is home to a free daily online newspaper, the YoCoNews that covers all of York and Lancaster counties. Magazines include Rock Hill Magazine and YC (York County) Magazine (which covers the entire county).

OTS Media Group owns and operates WRHI (News/Sports, 100.1 FM and 1340 AM), WRHM-FM (Country/Sports FM 107.1) and WRHM-FM HD2/W281BE/W232AX (Contemporary Christian, FM 94.3 & 104.1). There are also WAVO (Religious, 1150 AM), NPR affiliate WNSC-FM (88.9 FM), Southside Baptist Church of Rock Hill Christian broadcast station, WRHJ-LP (93.1 FM) and York Technical College campus radio station WYTX-LP (98.5.FM) .

Rock Hill has several television stations: PBS affiliate WNSC-TV (Channel 30), CN2, a daily cable news program produced by Comporium Communications for York, Chester, and Lancaster counties; MyNetworkTV station WMYT-TV Channel 55, is licensed to Rock Hill, but serves the entire Charlotte market, while their studios are shared with sister station WJZY-TV in unincorporated Mecklenburg County, North Carolina.

== Infrastructure ==
=== Transportation ===
==== Highway ====
From locations across the country, Rock Hill is most easily accessible by interstate highway.

- Interstate 77: Exit numbers 73–82
- Interstate 85: Exit number 102

==== Air ====
Rock Hill has two local airports. The Rock Hill/York County Airport is a municipal airport for the city of Rock Hill and serves non-commercial flights. The airport is located minutes from Rock Hill's Central business district. Also called Bryant Field, it was named for Robert E. Bryant, an aviator with two international records and an inductee in the South Carolina Aviation Hall of Fame (The name is no longer used for the airport because of confusion with Bryant Field (airport)). It is owned and operated by the City of Rock Hill, but York County is also represented on the Airport Commission.

The other local airport, the Charlotte-Douglas International Airport, is one of the busiest airports in the United States and is located 20 miles north of Rock Hill in Charlotte, North Carolina.

==== Public transportation ====
Rock Hill had one regional transit system, The Charlotte Area Transit System that offered express bus service from downtown Rock Hill to Uptown Charlotte, which was discontinued on July 1, 2026 due to the contract not being renewed.

- 82X Downtown Rock Hill to Manchester Village to Uptown Charlotte.

Rock Hill currently offers York County Access, a demand-response service, where trips must be scheduled at least two days in advance. It formerly offered My Ride, an electric bus transit service, which was replaced by York County Access on May 23, 2026.

==== Bike ====
Rock Hill is considered to be a bicycle-friendly town with numerous bike routes located throughout the city. There are also designated bike lanes located along major roads such as Eden Terrace and Oakland Avenue.

=== Public services ===
- Rock Hill Fire Department is a paid department made of two divisions and six fire stations located within the city.
- Rock Hill Police Department is the city's police force, comprising five divisions and nine specialized units.
- Piedmont Medical Center is an acute care hospital with a Level III trauma center, located in Rock Hill.

== Notable people ==
- Robert O'Neil Bristow – award-winning American novelist
- Benjamin O. Burnett – member of the South Carolina House of Representatives
- D.J. Burns – basketball player in the Israeli Basketball Premier League
- Patrick Caddell – served in the Jimmy Carter administration, and was a political consultant
- Lauren Cholewinski – Olympic speedskater
- Matt Christopher – children's sports author
- Lafayette Currence – baseball pitcher
- Ed Currie – grew some of the world's hottest peppers, such as the Carolina Reaper and Pepper X
- Emery – nationally known emo band
- William G. Enloe – mayor of Raleigh, North Carolina
- DJ Felli Fel – charted on the Hot 100 with "Get Buck in Here" 2007
- Vernon Grant – commercial artist and creator of the Snap, Crackle and Pop characters for Kellogg's Rice Krispies cereal
- Jim Hoagland – journalist and two-time Pulitzer Prize winner
- Ironing Board Sam – blues keyboardist
- Cecil Ivory – Presbyterian minister and civil rights leader who lead desegregation protests in Rock Hill
- Cheslie Kryst – Miss USA 2019
- Edmund Lewandowski – Precisionist movement artist, chairman of the art department at Winthrop, from 1973 to 1984
- William Ivey Long – Tony Award-winning costume designer
- Ralph Norman – U.S. Representative
- Jim Ray – Major League Baseball pitcher
- Leon Rippy – actor in The Patriot
- Justin Worley – former QB for the University of Tennessee

=== National Football League players ===
- Phillip Adams – former NFL cornerback
- Jeff Burris – former NFL player currently the cornerbacks coach at Louisiana Tech
- Jadeveon Clowney – currently an outside linebacker for the Carolina Panthers
- Gerald Dixon – former NFL linebacker for multiple teams
- Stephon Gilmore – 2019 AP NFL Defensive Player of the Year, currently a free agent
- Tori Gurley – former football player in the NFL and CFL
- Jonathan Hefney – former football player in the NFL and CFL
- DeVonte Holloman – former football player in the NFL
- Chris Hope – former NFL player and pro bowler
- Johnathan Joseph – former NFL cornerback
- Derion Kendrick – currently a cornerback for the Los Angeles Rams
- Spencer Lanning – former punter in the NFL
- Robert Massey – former NFL cornerback for multiple teams
- Jonathan Meeks – former NFL safety
- Cordarrelle Patterson – current running back for the Pittsburgh Steelers
- Derek Ross – former cornerback for multiple teams in the NFL
- Mason Rudolph – currently a quarterback for the Pittsburgh Steelers
- Rick Sanford – former defensive back for the New England Patriots and Seattle Seahawks
- Jaleel Scott – currently a free agent wide receiver
- Ko Simpson – former safety in the NFL
- Benjamin Watson – former tight end for the New England Patriots and New Orleans Saints

== In popular culture ==
=== Films ===
- Asylum – 2008, at Winthrop University
- Gospel Hill – 2008
- The Patriot – 2000, parts shot in rural Rock Hill
- The Rage: Carrie 2 – 1999
- Black Rainbow – 1989
- Walker Payne – 2006

=== Music ===
- "Promised Land" – 1964 song by Chuck Berry, namechecks the city as a destination the narrator bypasses on his trip out west

== See also ==
- List of municipalities in South Carolina
