= Arkansas Highway 128 =

State highway in Arkansas, United States

Highway 128

Route information
- Maintained by ArDOT

Section 1
- Length: 11.99 mi (19.30 km)
- West end: AR 7 in Sparkman
- East end: AR 9 at Holly Springs

Section 2
- Length: 6.23 mi (10.03 km)
- West end: AR 51 at Joan
- East end: AR 7 / AR 8 at Gravel Junction

Section 3
- Length: 20.04 mi (32.25 km)
- West end: AR 7 near DeGray Lake Resort State Park
- East end: US 270B in Hot Springs

Section 4
- Length: 8.78 mi (14.13 km)
- West end: AR 5 in Fountain Lake
- East end: US 70 near Lonsdale

Location
- Country: United States
- State: Arkansas
- Counties: Dallas, Clark, Hot Spring, Garland, Saline

Highway system
- Arkansas Highway System; Interstate; US; State; Business; Spurs; Suffixed; Scenic; Heritage
← AR 127	→ AR 129

Arkansas Highway 128 (AR 128) is a designation for four state highways in Southwest Arkansas. One segment of 11.99 miles (19.30 km) runs from Highway 7 in Sparkman east to Highway 9 at Holly Springs. A second segment of 6.23 miles (10.03 km) runs from Highway 51 at Joan north to Highway 7 at Gravel Junction. A third segment of 20.04 miles (32.25 km) runs from Highway 7 north of DeGray Lake Resort State Park northeast to U.S. Route 270B (US 270B) in Hot Springs. A fourth segment of 8.78 miles (14.13 km) runs from Highway 5 in Fountain Lake east to US 70 north of Lonsdale. All routes are maintained by the Arkansas Department of Transportation (ArDOT).

== Route description ==
All four routes are low-traffic, two-lane, undivided roads winding through the Piney Woods of Southwest Arkansas. No segment of Highway 157 has been listed as part of the National Highway System, a network of roads important to the nation's economy, defense, and mobility.

The ArDOT maintains Highway 128 like all other parts of the state highway system. As a part of these responsibilities, the department tracks the volume of traffic using its roads in surveys using a metric called average annual daily traffic (AADT). ArDOT estimates the traffic level for a segment of roadway for any average day of the year in these surveys.

=== Sparkman to Holly Springs ===
Highway 128 begins at Sparkman, a small town in rural Dallas County. It runs due east as Main Street, passing Sparkman Elementary School and Sparkman High School before entering downtown. Continuing east, Highway 128 exits the town and enters a rural, forested area. It passes through the unincorporated community of New Hope, and intersects Highway 207 at Pine Grove. Near Pine Grove, Highway 128 passes the historic Sardis Methodist Church, listed on the National Register of Historic Places (NRHP). Continuing southeasterly, Highway 128 passes near the Brazeale Homestead, also listed on the NRHP, before crossing Tulip Creek and White Oak Creek. Southeast of these creek crossings, a proposed intersection with Highway 273 is marked on the county map produced by ArDOT (as of January 2018). The Highway 273 extension was approved in 1973, but remains unbuilt. Highway 128 continues southeast to Holly Springs, passing the NRHP-listed Capt. Goodgame House. In Holly Springs, Highway 128 terminates at an intersection with Highway 9.

AADT for the highway was highest at the western terminus, 1,600 vehicles per day. Outside the city limits of Sparkman, the traffic counts dropped below 1,000 with a low of 740 between Pine Grove and Holly Springs.

=== Joan to Gravel Ridge ===
The highway begins at Highway 51 east of Arkadelphia. It runs south through a sparsely populated rural area with swamps, sloughs, and pine trees, crossing L'eau Frais Creek and becoming a section line road southbound. The highway passes a small, discontinuous segment of the Big Timber Wildlife Management Area (WMA) south of the creek crossing. Highway 128 turns west at Mill Creek, terminating at an intersection with Highway 7/Highway 8 at Gravel Junction. Other than the termini, Highway 128 does not intersect any other state highways. AADT for the highway was estimated to be 270 VPD at a point north of the route's midpoint in 2016.

=== De Gray Lake Resort State Park to Hot Springs ===
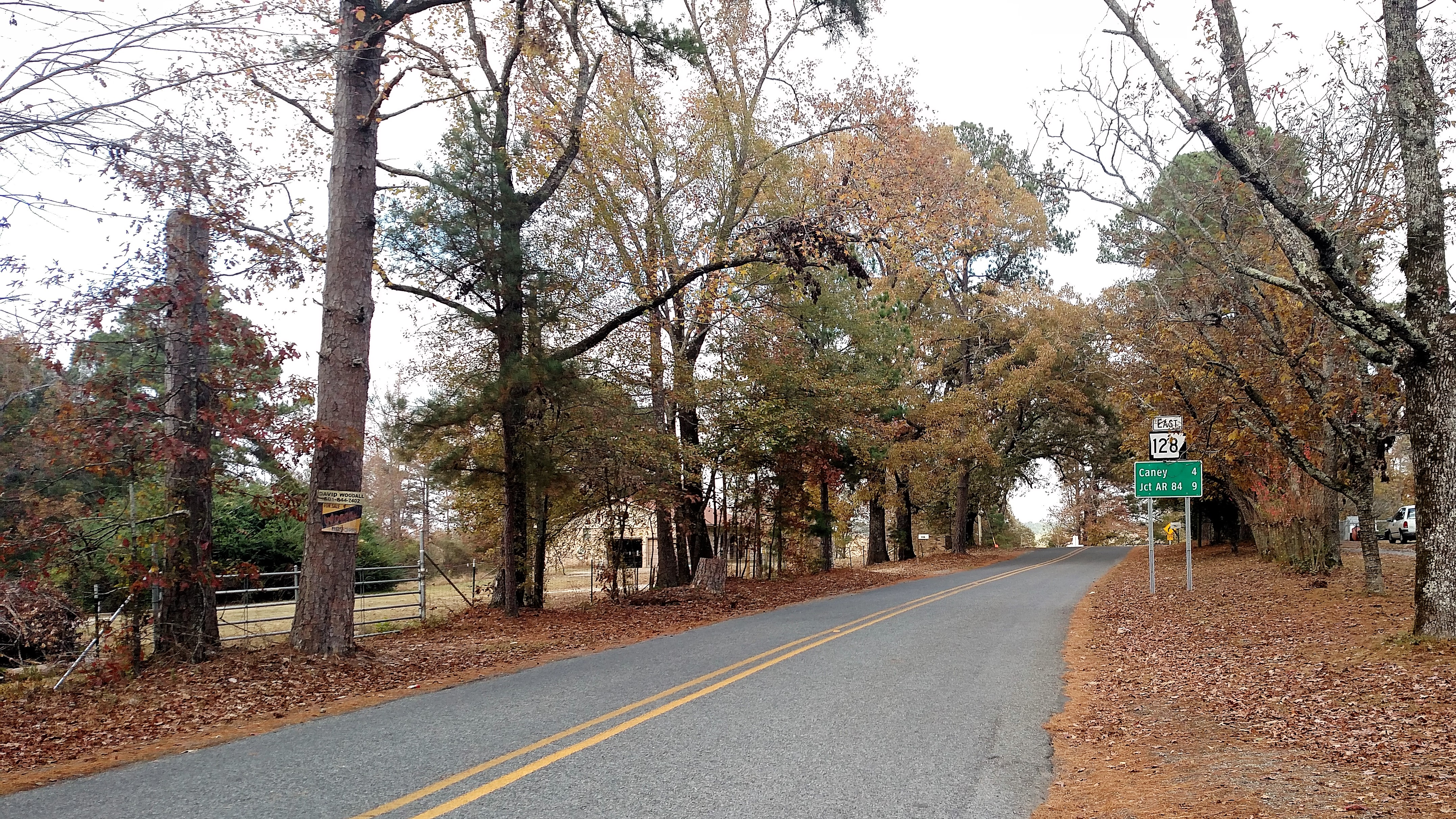
First reassurance marker eastbound in Hot Spring County

Highway 128 begins north of DeGray Lake Resort State Park in the Ouachita Mountains. It runs east across Caney Creek to Caney, where it serves as the northern terminus of Highway 283. Highway 128 turns north at the junction, weaving through a sparsely populated pine forest. The route briefly overlaps Highway 84 at De Roche. North of the overlap, Highway 128 becomes the eastern edge of the Jack Mountain WMA, which offers deer, turkey, and bear hunting (among others) to permitted hunters through the Arkansas Game and Fish Commission (AGFC). Upon entering Garland County, Highway 128 begins an overlap with Highway 290 around the southeastern edge of Lake Hamilton, with the concurrency ending just north of Red Oak. The highway bridges Lake Catherine just east of Carpenter Dam before entering Hot Springs, the county seat of Garland County, where it becomes Carpenter Dam Road. Highway 128 winds north through an undeveloped section of the city before crossing US 70/US 270. North of this interchange, the highway passes an industrial facility and the Arkansas State Police Troop K Headquarters before terminating at a junction with US 270B (Malvern Avenue).

=== Fountain Lake to Lonsdale ===
In northeast Garland County, Highway 128 begins at Highway 5 in Fountain Lake. The entire length of the highway is known as Lonsdale Cutoff Road.

The highway runs east across the South Fork Ouachita River, with a historic 1928 bridge paralleling the highway's modern span. East of the town, Highway 128 passes through rural forested area, nearing the Saline County line before turning southward. Highway 128 briefly enters Saline County before returning to Garland County, where it terminates at US 70 north of Lonsdale. AADT for the highway was estimated to be 1,700 VPD near the eastern terminus in 2016.

== History ==
The original Highway 128 was created in 1928, from Highway 27 southwest of Murfreesboro southwest to Highway 24 (now US 371). In 1937, Highway 128 became part of Highway 26, and State Road 7A between Holly Springs and Pine Grove was renumbered as Highway 128. Highway 128 was extended later.

== Major intersections ==
County	Location	mi	km	Destinations	Notes
Dallas	Sparkman	0.00	0.00	AR 7	Western terminus
Dallas	Pine Grove	5.53	8.90	AR 207 south – Ouachita	Northern terminus of AR 207
Dallas				AR 273 east – Fordyce	Proposed intersection
Dallas	Holly Springs	11.99	19.30	AR 9 – Camden, Malvern	Eastern terminus
Gap in route
Clark	Joan	0.00	0.00	AR 51 – Arkadelphia, Donaldson	Western terminus
Clark	Gravel Junction	6.23	10.03	AR 7 (AR 8) – Dalark, Arkadelphia	Eastern terminus
Gap in route
Hot Spring		0.00	0.00	AR 7 – Hot Springs, Caddo Valley	Western terminus
Hot Spring	Caney	3.96	6.37	AR 283 south – Caddo Valley	Northern terminus of AR 283
Hot Spring	De Roche	9.51– 0.00	15.30– 0.00	AR 84 – Bismarck, Social Hill	
Garland		6.65– 0.00	10.70– 0.00	AR 290 – Bismarck	
Garland		1.20– 1.32	1.93– 2.12	Bridge over Lake Catherine	
Garland	Hot Springs	3.44	5.54	US 70 / US 270 – Hot Springs, Malvern	Exit 7 on US 70/US 270
Garland	Hot Springs	3.88	6.24	US 270B (Malvern Avenue)	Eastern terminus
Garland	Gap in route				
Garland	Fountain Lake	0.00	0.00	AR 5 – Hot Springs, Hot Springs Village, Benton	Western terminus
Saline	No major junctions				
Garland		8.78	14.13	US 70 – Benton, Hot Springs	Eastern terminus
1.000 mi = 1.609 km; 1.000 km = 0.621 mi: Concurrency terminus; Unopened
