= Ouachita =

Ouachita may refer to:

== Places ==
In the United States:

- Ouachita, Arkansas, an unincorporated community
- Ouachita City, Louisiana, an unincorporated community
- The Ouachita Mountains in Arkansas and Oklahoma
- The Ouachita orogeny, the geologic event that raised the Ouachita Mountains
- The Ouachita River in Arkansas and Louisiana
- Lake Ouachita
- Ouachita County, Arkansas
- Ouachita Parish, Louisiana
- Ouachita National Forest in Arkansas and Oklahoma
- Ouachita National Recreation Trail in Arkansas and Oklahoma

== Native Americans ==
- The Ouachita people, a Caddo group from northeastern Louisiana

== Education ==
- Ouachita Baptist University, a private liberal arts institution in Arkansas
- Ouachita Hills College, a missionary training college in southwest Arkansas

== Business ==
- Ouachita Railroad, a Class III short-line railroad headquartered in Arkansas
- Ouachita Electric Cooperative, a rural electric utility cooperative

== Nature ==
- Ouachita creekshell, a species of mussel
- Ouachita darter, a species of darter
- Ouachita dusky salamander, a species of salamander
- Ouachita madtom, a species of catfish
- Ouachita map turtle, a species of turtle
- Ouachita pebblesnail, a species of snail
- Ouachita rock pocketbook, another species of mussel
- Ouachita shiner, a species of minnow
- Ouachita streambed salamander, another species of salamander
- Ouachita burrowing crayfish
- Ouachita fencing crayfish
- Ouachita mountain crayfish
- Ouachita river crayfish

== See also ==
- Wichita (disambiguation)
- Washita (disambiguation)
