= Fountain Lake, Arkansas =

Town in Arkansas, United States

- Town
- Town of Fountain Lake
- Location in Garland County and Arkansas

- Location in the United States
- Coordinates: 34°37′03″N 92°55′21″W
- Country: United States
- State: Arkansas
- County: Garland
- Township: Whittington
- Incorporated: July 13, 1999
- Named after: Fountain Lake Resort

Government
  - Type: Mayor–Council
  - Council: Town Council

Area
  - Total: 4.25 sq mi (11.01 km^{2})
  - Land: 4.25 sq mi (11.01 km^{2})
  - Water: 0 sq mi (0.00 km^{2})
- Elevation: 522 ft (159 m)

Population (2020)
  - Total: 475
  - Estimate (2025): 473 ▼
  - Density: 111.8/sq mi (43.16/km^{2})
- Time zone: UTC-6 (Central (CST))
  - Summer (DST): UTC-5 (CDT)
- ZIP code: 71901
- Area code: 501
- FIPS code: 05-24700
- GNIS feature ID: 2406514
- Highways: Highway 5; Highway 128
- Major airport: Clinton National Airport (LIT)
- Website: townoffountainlake.com

Fountain Lake is a town in Garland County, Arkansas, United States. Bordering Hot Springs Village, the town is part of the Hot Springs Metropolitan Statistical Area. As of the 2020 census, Fountain Lake had a population of 475.

== Geography ==
Fountain Lake is located in eastern Garland County. According to the United States Census Bureau, the town has a total area of 3.9 square miles (10.1 km^{2}), all land. The town is 12 miles (19 km) northeast of downtown Hot Springs and is bordered to the north by unincorporated Hot Springs Village.

The community is named for a former resort on the southern edge of the area. The location is directly off Highway 7, across from Fountain Lake Center (a strip mall), and can be identified by a large stucco entrance gate and a long tree-lined drive. The property contains remnants of a large home, barn, and other out-buildings. A small lake with an ornamental fountain are intact. The property is privately owned.

The Fountain Lake Center, historical Fountain Lake estate, and Fountain Lake School are not actually in the town limits of Fountain Lake. The town limits include approximately 3 miles (5 km) (and community roads attached) along Highway 5 and 2 miles (3 km) along Highway 128. All other associated property outside these limits is part of Garland County, not the town of Fountain Lake.

== Demographics ==
Historical population
Census	Pop.	Note	%±
2000	409		—
2010	503		23.0%
2020	475		−5.6%
2025 (est.)	473	▼	−0.4%
U.S. Decennial Census; 2018 Estimate

As of the census of 2000, there were 409 people, 161 households, and 126 families residing in the town. The population density was 115.4 inhabitants per square mile (44.6/km^{2}). There were 174 housing units at an average density of 49.1 per square mile (19.0/km^{2}). The racial makeup of the town was 97.56% White, 0.24% Black or African American, 0.98% Native American, 0.73% from other races, and 0.49% from two or more races. 0.73% of the population were Hispanic or Latino of any race.

There were 161 households, out of which 32.3% had children under the age of 18 living with them, 59.0% were married couples living together, 13.7% had a female householder with no husband present, and 21.7% were non-families. 16.8% of all households were made up of individuals, and 4.3% had someone living alone who was 65 years of age or older. The average household size was 2.54 and the average family size was 2.85.

In the town, the population was spread out, with 23.2% under the age of 18, 8.1% from 18 to 24, 30.1% from 25 to 44, 26.7% from 45 to 64, and 12.0% who were 65 years of age or older. The median age was 38 years. For every 100 females, there were 101.5 males. For every 100 females age 18 and over, there were 97.5 males.

The median income for a household in the town was $30,469, and the median income for a family was $31,188. Males had a median income of $25,547 versus $11,731 for females. The per capita income for the town was $15,943. About 8.1% of families and 16.2% of the population were below the poverty line, including 23.5% of those under age 18 and none of those age 65 or over.

== Education ==
Fountain Lake is home to the Fountain Lake School District, which operates Fountain Lake High School. Their mascot is the Cobra, originally proposed by Buster Clemmons from the class of 1934. The Fountain Lake School District, as of 2013, offers six Advanced Placement courses, ten sports, and has over twenty clubs and organizations available for students. The Fountain Lake School District has multiple state titles. Among the state titles, The Fountain Lake Football Team won their first State Championship in 2009 against Prescott High School, the Senior High Women's Chorus, in 2013, received scores of superior (being a first for Fountain Lake) and excellent at State Choir Competition, and had various students receive state awards for outstanding performance. The Fountain Lake School District has hosted nineteen yearly musicals, as of 2012, in the auditorium, and has two tornado shelters, built in 2012, that hosts various community events.
