= South Fork Bridge =

- U.S. National Register of Historic Places
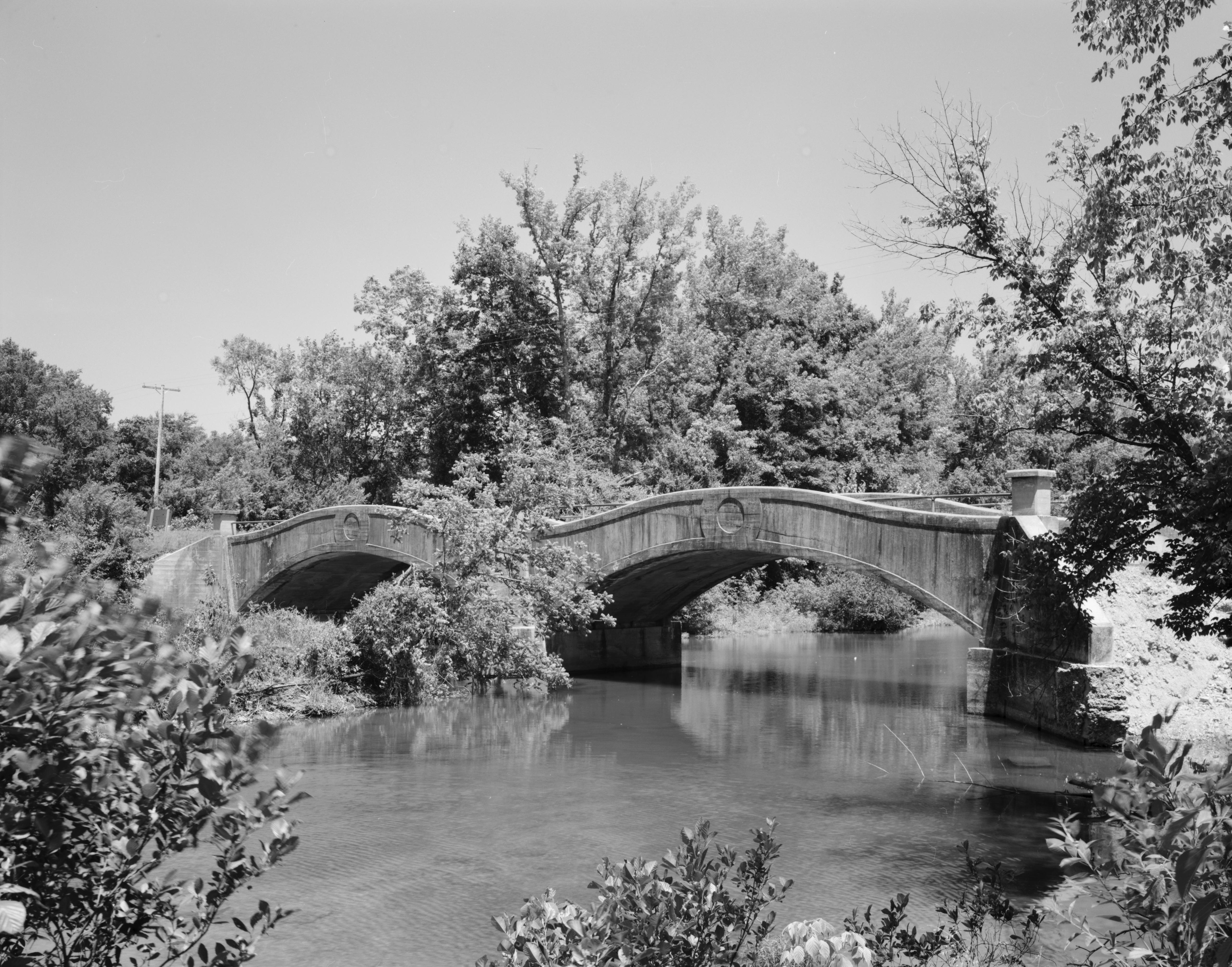
- HAER photo, 1988

- Location within Arkansas Location within the United States
- Nearest city: Fountain Lake, Arkansas
- Coordinates: 34°36′11″N 92°55′20″W
- Area: less than one acre
- Built: 1928
- Architect: H. S. Moreland, F. M. Kelley
- Architectural style: Closed-spandrel deck arch
- MPS: Historic Bridges of Arkansas MPS
- NRHP reference No.: 90000521
- Added to NRHP: April 9, 1990

The South Fork Bridge is a historic bridge spanning the South Fork Saline River in Fountain Lake, Arkansas. It formerly carried Arkansas Highway 128, whose modern bridge now stands just to the south, a short way east of its junction with Arkansas Highway 5. It is a two-span concrete closed-spandrel arch structure, with spans of 57 feet (17 m) and a roadway width of 16 feet (4.9 m). It was built in 1928 by a county crew, after major flooding in 1927 damaged road infrastructure in the area.

The bridge was listed on the National Register of Historic Places in 1990.

== See also ==
- List of bridges documented by the Historic American Engineering Record in Arkansas
- List of bridges on the National Register of Historic Places in Arkansas
- National Register of Historic Places listings in Garland County, Arkansas
