= Hobbseus valleculus =

Conservation status
- Endangered (IUCN 3.1)

- Critically Imperiled (NatureServe)

Scientific classification
- Kingdom: Animalia
- Phylum: Arthropoda
- Class: Malacostraca
- Order: Decapoda
- Suborder: Pleocyemata
- Family: Cambaridae
- Genus: Hobbseus
- Species: H. valleculus

Binomial name
- Hobbseus valleculus (Fitzpatrick, 1967)

Species of crayfish

Hobbseus valleculus, the Choctaw riverlet crayfish, is a species of crayfish in the family Cambaridae. It is endemic to Mississippi in the United States.

The IUCN conservation status of Hobbseus valleculus is "EN", endangered. The species faces a high risk of extinction in the near future. The IUCN status was reviewed in 2010.
