= Washita =

Washita may refer to

- Washita River
- Washita County, Oklahoma
- Washita, Arkansas, Montgomery County, Arkansas
- Washita, Oklahoma, Caddo County, Oklahoma
- Washita Battlefield National Historic Site
- Washita National Wildlife Refuge, Custer County, Oklahoma
- Battle of Washita River
- Fort Washita, Bryan County, Oklahoma
- Little Washita River, Grady County, Oklahoma
- Washita tribe of Native Americans from northeastern Louisiana along the Ouachita River.

== See also ==
- Ouachita (disambiguation)
- Wichita (disambiguation)
