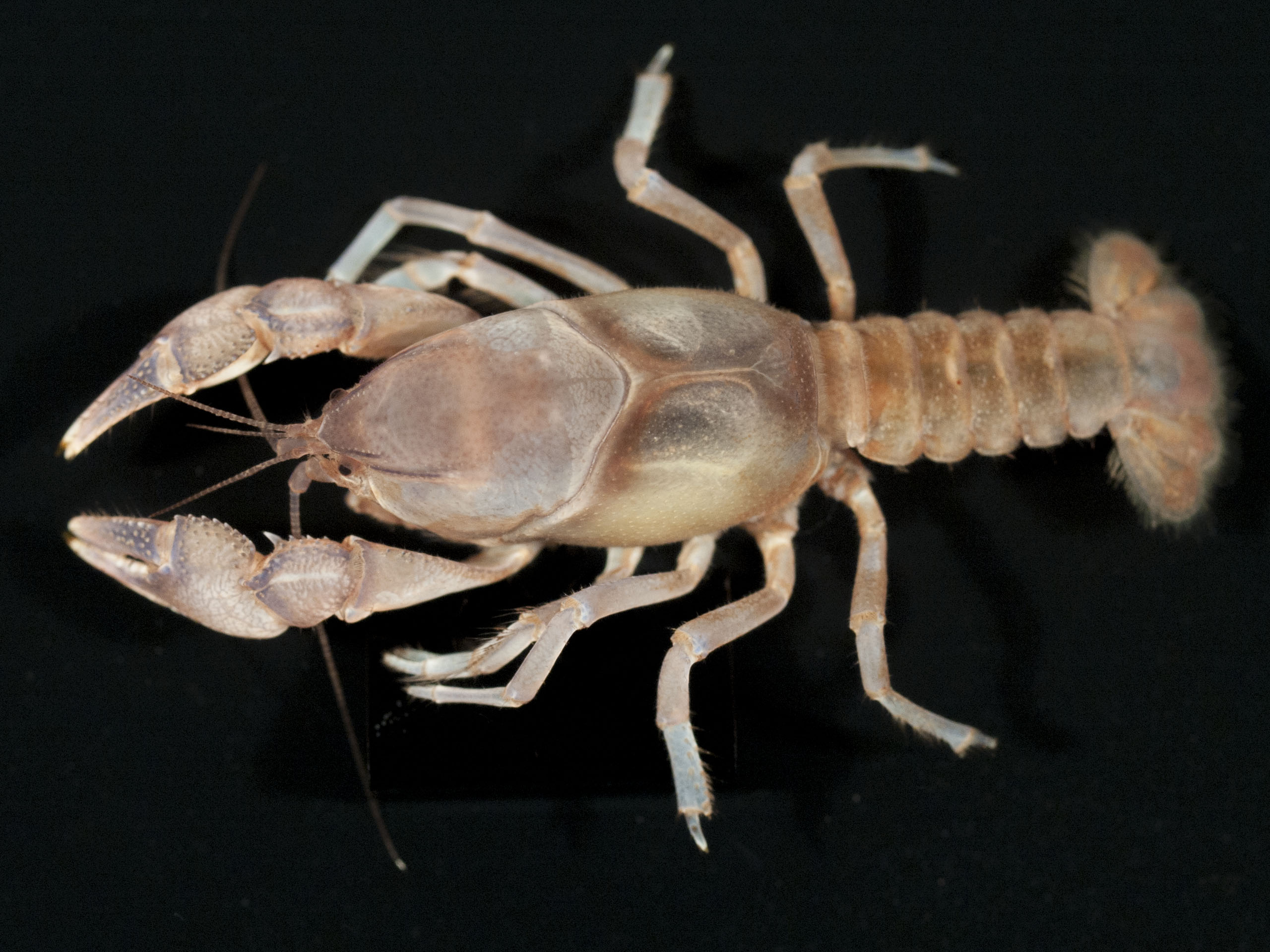

Conservation status
- Data Deficient (IUCN 3.1)

- Vulnerable (NatureServe)

Scientific classification
- Kingdom: Animalia
- Phylum: Arthropoda
- Class: Malacostraca
- Order: Decapoda
- Suborder: Pleocyemata
- Family: Cambaridae
- Genus: Creaserinus
- Species: C. burrisi

Binomial name
- Creaserinus burrisi (Fitzpatrick, 1987)

Synonyms
- Fallicambarus burrisi

= Creaserinus burrisi =

Species of crayfish

Creaserinus burrisi, the burrowing bog crayfish, is a species of crayfish in the family Cambaridae. It is found in a limited range in southeastern Mississippi and southwestern Alabama.

The IUCN conservation status of Creaserinus burrisi is "DD", data deficient, risk undetermined. This status was last reviewed in 2010.
