= Creaserinus hortoni =

Conservation status
- Critically Endangered (IUCN 3.1)

- Critically Imperiled (NatureServe)

Scientific classification
- Kingdom: Animalia
- Phylum: Arthropoda
- Class: Malacostraca
- Order: Decapoda
- Suborder: Pleocyemata
- Family: Cambaridae
- Genus: Creaserinus
- Species: C. hortoni

Binomial name
- Creaserinus hortoni (Hobbs & Fitzpatrick, 1970)

Species of crayfish

Creaserinus hortoni, the Hatchie burrowing crayfish, is a species of crayfish in the family Cambaridae. It is found in western Tennessee and northern Mississippi.

The IUCN conservation status of Creaserinus hortoni is "CR", critically endangered. The species faces an extremely high risk of extinction in the immediate future. The IUCN status was updated in 2020.
