= Arkansas Highway 283 =

State highway in Arkansas, United States

Highway 283

Route information
- Maintained by ArDOT
- Existed: May 29, 1963–present

Section 1
- Length: 3.14 mi (5.05 km)
- South end: AR 7 near Caddo Valley
- North end: AR 128 at Caney

Section 2
- Length: 1.14 mi (1.83 km)
- South end: US 67 in Friendship
- North end: Caney Road near Friendship

Location
- Country: United States
- State: Arkansas
- Counties: Clark, Hot Spring

Highway system
- Arkansas Highway System; Interstate; US; State; Business; Spurs; Suffixed; Scenic; Heritage
| ← AR 282 | → AR 284 |

Highway 283 (AR 283, Ark. 283, and Hwy. 283) is a designation for two north–south state highways in Southwest Arkansas. One route of 3.14 miles (5.05 km) begins at Highway 7 and runs north to Highway 128 at Caney. A second route of 1.14 miles (1.83 km) begins at US Highway 67 (US 67) in Friendship and runs north across Interstate 30 (I-30) to Caney Road. Both routes are maintained by the Arkansas Department of Transportation (ARDOT).

== Route description ==
=== Highway 7 to Caney ===
Highway 283 begins at Highway 7 in northeast Clark County near DeGray Lake Resort State Park. The route winds northeast to cross De Roche Creek and enter Hot Spring County. Continuing north, Highway 283 intersects Highway 128 at Caney, where it terminates.

=== Friendship ===
Highway 283 begins at US 67 (Malvern Road) in Friendship and runs northwest as Caney Road to the city limits. Continuing northwest, Highway 283 crosses over I-30 at exit 83. The highway continues northwest for 0.3 miles (0.48 km), terminating at Post Oak Road and Penn Road. The roadway continues towards Caney as Caney Road.

== Major intersections ==
| County | Location | mi | km | Destinations | Notes |
|---|---|---|---|---|---|
| Clark | | 0.00 | 0.00 | AR 7 – Arkadelphia, Hot Springs | Southern terminus |
| Hot Spring | Caney | 3.14 | 5.05 | AR 128 | Northern terminus |
| Hot Spring | Gap in route | | | | |
| Hot Spring | Friendship | 0.00 | 0.00 | US 67 (Malvern Rpad) | Southern terminus |
| Hot Spring | | 0.89 | 1.43 | I-30 – Little Rock, Texarkana | exit 83 |
| Hot Spring | | 1.14 | 1.83 | Post Oak Rd | Northern terminus |
1.000 mi = 1.609 km; 1.000 km = 0.621 mi

== History ==
The section near Caney was added to the state highway system on May 29, 1963. The Friendship to I-30 section was created on February 28, 1968; part of a batch of new state highways created to connect Interstates to the former US Routes they bypassed.
