= Hobbseus =

Scientific classification
- Kingdom: Animalia
- Phylum: Arthropoda
- Clade: Pancrustacea
- Class: Malacostraca
- Order: Decapoda
- Suborder: Pleocyemata
- Family: Cambaridae
- Genus: Hobbseus (Fitzpatrick & Payne, 1968)

Type species
- Hobbseus cristatus (Hobbs, 1955)

Genus of crayfishes

Hobbseus is a genus of crayfish in the family Cambaridae. It comprises seven species, six of which are endemic to Mississippi; H. prominens is the only species to range outside Mississippi, being also found in Alabama. Three of the seven species are listed as endangered (EN) on the IUCN Red List, while three are of uncertain status (DD) and one is of least concern (LC).

- Hobbseus attenuatus Black, 1969 –
- Hobbseus cristatus (Hobbs, 1955) –
- Hobbseus orconectoides Fitzpatrick & Payne, 1968 –
- Hobbseus petilus Fitzpatrick, 1977 –
- Hobbseus prominens (Hobbs, 1966) –
- Hobbseus valleculus (Fitzpatrick, 1967) –
- Hobbseus yalobushensis Fitzpatrick & Busack, 1989 –
