= Arkansas Highway 207 =

State highway in Arkansas, United States

Highway 207

Route information
- Maintained by ArDOT
- Length: 4.145 mi (6.671 km)
- Existed: March 7, 1962–present

Major junctions
- South end: AR 7 near Ouachita
- North end: AR 128 near Pine Grove

Location
- Country: United States
- State: Arkansas
- Counties: Dallas

Highway system
- Arkansas Highway System; Interstate; US; State; Business; Spurs; Suffixed; Scenic; Heritage
← AR 206	→ AR 208

Highway 207 (AR 207, Hwy. 207) is a north–south state highway in Dallas County, Arkansas. It was created in 1962 along a former county road. The route is maintained by the Arkansas Department of Transportation (ArDOT). A former designation in the same vicinity was deleted in 1973.

== Route description ==
Highway 207 serves an area of rural Dallas County, part of the Piney Woods region dominated by pine tree plantations. No segment of Highway 207 has been listed as part of the National Highway System, a network of roads important to the nation's economy, defense, and mobility.

Highway 207 begins at Highway 7 three miles (4.8 km) east of the Ouachita River near the unincorporated community of Ouachita. The highway passes through sparsely populated woods in a northeasterly direction to Highway 128, where it terminates. The highway does not cross or concur with any other state highways.

The ArDOT maintains Highway 207 like all other parts of the state highway system. As a part of these responsibilities, the department tracks the volume of traffic using its roads in surveys using a metric called average annual daily traffic (AADT). ARDOT estimates the traffic level for a segment of roadway for any average day of the year in these surveys. As of 2019, AADT was estimated as 60 vehicles per day (VPD) near the southern terminus. For reference, the American Association of State Highway and Transportation Officials (AASHTO), classifies roads with fewer than 400 vehicles per day as a very low volume local road.

== Major intersections ==
The entire route is in Dallas County.

Location	mi	km	Destinations	Notes
	0.000	0.000	AR 7 east – Camden, Sparkman	Southern terminus
	4.145	6.671	AR 128 – Sparkman, Holly Springs	Northern terminus
1.000 mi = 1.609 km; 1.000 km = 0.621 mi

== History ==
The highway was created by the Arkansas State Highway Commission on March 7, 1962, as part of a program adding over 100 miles (160 km) to the state highway system.

=== Former route ===
Highway 207
- Location: Dallas County
- Length: 8.16 mi (13.13 km)
- Existed: July 10, 1957–May 23, 1973

Highway 207 (AR 207, Hwy. 207) is a former state highway in Dallas County. It was a rural, two-lane highway connecting Sparkman to Highway 8. The highway did not cross or concur with any other state highways.

History

The Arkansas General Assembly passed Act 148 of 1957, the Milum Road Act, creating 10–12 miles (16–19 km) of new state highways in each county. Highway 207 was created by the Arkansas State Highway Commission on July 10, 1957, from Sparkman northeast for 2.3 miles (3.7 km). The order was revised to extend Highway 207 another 1.7 miles (2.7 km) on July 9, 1958. The highway was extended again, to Highway 8, on June 29, 1960. It was deleted on May 23, 1973, in an exchange that extended Highway 273 at the request of the Dallas County Judge.

Major intersections

The entire route was in Dallas County.

Location	mi	km	Destinations	Notes
	0.00	0.00	AR 128	Southern terminus
	8.16	13.13	AR 8	Northern terminus
1.000 mi = 1.609 km; 1.000 km = 0.621 mi
