= Lonsdale, Arkansas =

- Town
- Location of Lonsdale in Garland County, Arkansas.
- Coordinates: 34°32′42″N 92°48′38″W
- Country: United States
- State: Arkansas
- County: Garland

Area
  - Total: 0.41 sq mi (1.05 km^{2})
  - Land: 0.41 sq mi (1.05 km^{2})
  - Water: 0 sq mi (0.00 km^{2})
- Elevation: 433 ft (132 m)

Population (2020)
  - Total: 103
  - Estimate (2025): 106 ▲
  - Density: 255.2/sq mi (98.52/km^{2})
- Time zone: UTC-6 (Central (CST))
  - Summer (DST): UTC-5 (CDT)
- ZIP code: 72087
- Area code: 501
- FIPS code: 05-41450
- GNIS feature ID: 2406042

Lonsdale is a town in Garland County, Arkansas, United States. It is part of the Hot Springs Metropolitan Statistical Area. The population was 103 at the 2020 census.

== Geography ==
Lonsdale is located in eastern Garland County on Highway 171, south of U.S. Route 70. It is 17 miles (27 km) east of Hot Springs and 14 miles (23 km) west of Benton.. According to the United States Census Bureau, the town has a total area of 0.42 square miles (1.1 km^{2}), all land.

== Demographics ==
Historical population
Census	Pop.	Note	%±
1920	166		—
1930	153		−7.8%
1940	119		−22.2%
1950	91		−23.5%
1960	95		4.4%
1970	104		9.5%
1980	117		12.5%
1990	127		8.5%
2000	127		0.0%
2010	94		−26.0%
2020	103		9.6%
2025 (est.)	106	▲	2.9%
U.S. Decennial Census

As of the census of 2000, there were 118 people, 49 households, and 34 families residing in the town. The population density was 287.0 inhabitants per square mile (110.8/km^{2}). There were 53 housing units at an average density of 128.9 per square mile (49.8/km^{2}). The racial makeup of the town was 97.46% White, and 2.54% from two or more races. 0.85% of the population were Hispanic or Latino of any race.

There were 49 households, out of which 34.7% had children under the age of 18 living with them, 67.3% were married couples living together, 4.1% had a female householder with no husband present, and 28.6% were non-families. 28.6% of all households were made up of individuals, and 12.2% had someone living alone who was 65 years of age or older. The average household size was 2.41 and the average family size was 2.97.

In the town, the population was spread out, with 23.7% under the age of 18, 7.6% from 18 to 24, 27.1% from 25 to 44, 29.7% from 45 to 64, and 11.9% who were 65 years of age or older. The median age was 41 years. For every 100 females, there were 90.3 males. For every 100 females age 18 and over, there were 95.7 males.

The median income for a household in the town was $25,500, and the median income for a family was $26,000. Males had a median income of $31,250 versus $23,750 for females. The per capita income for the town was $11,572. There were 14.7% of families and 22.3% of the population living below the poverty line, including 35.9% of under eighteens and none of those over 64.

== Education ==
Public education for early childhood, elementary and secondary school students is provided by the Benton School District and Fountain Lake School District, which leads to graduation from Benton High School and Fountain Lake High School.
