= Creaserinus gordoni =

Conservation status
- Near Threatened (IUCN 3.1)

- Critically Imperiled (NatureServe)

Scientific classification
- Kingdom: Animalia
- Phylum: Arthropoda
- Class: Malacostraca
- Order: Decapoda
- Suborder: Pleocyemata
- Family: Cambaridae
- Genus: Creaserinus
- Species: C. gordoni

Binomial name
- Creaserinus gordoni Fitzpatrick, 1987

Synonyms
- Fallicambarus gordoni

Species of crayfish

Creaserinus gordoni, the Camp Shelby burrowing crayfish, is a species of crayfish in the family Cambaridae. It is endemic to Camp Shelby in Mississippi.

The IUCN conservation status of Creaserinus gordoni is "NT", near threatened. The species may be considered threatened in the near future. The IUCN status was reviewed in 2010. The species enjoys some protection under a Candidate Conservation Agreement, between Mississippi National Guard and The Nature Conservancy.
