= Hobbseus yalobushensis =

Conservation status
- Endangered (IUCN 3.1)

- Imperiled (NatureServe)

Scientific classification
- Kingdom: Animalia
- Phylum: Arthropoda
- Clade: Pancrustacea
- Class: Malacostraca
- Order: Decapoda
- Suborder: Pleocyemata
- Family: Cambaridae
- Genus: Hobbseus
- Species: H. yalobushensis

Binomial name
- Hobbseus yalobushensis (Fitzpatrick & Busack, 1989)

Species of crayfish

Hobbseus yalobushensis, the Yalobusha Riverlet Crayfish, is a species of crayfish in the family Cambaridae. It is endemic to Mississippi.
