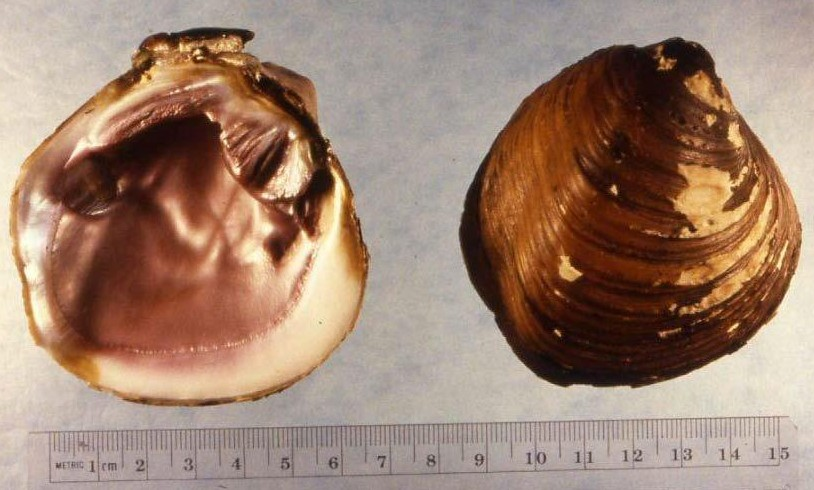
- Dried valves

Conservation status
- Critically Endangered (IUCN 2.3)

- Endangered (ESA)

Scientific classification
- Kingdom: Animalia
- Phylum: Mollusca
- Class: Bivalvia
- Order: Unionida
- Family: Unionidae
- Genus: Obovaria
- Species: O. retusa

Binomial name
- Obovaria retusa (Lamarck, 1819)

Synonyms
- Unio retusa Lamarck, 1819; Obovaria torsa Rafinesque, 1820; Unio incurvis Say, 1829; Obovaria torsa subsp. marginata Rafinesque, 1820

= Obovaria retusa =

Species of bivalve

Obovaria retusa is a rare species of freshwater mussel in the family Unionidae, the river mussels. Its common names include golf stick pearly mussel and ring pink.

This mussel was native to Alabama, Illinois, Indiana, Kentucky, Ohio, Pennsylvania, Tennessee, and West Virginia. By 1991 it was thought that there were about five populations remaining in Kentucky, Tennessee, and West Virginia. It is now thought to be extirpated from West Virginia, as the population there was a misidentification. Only a few specimens of the species have been observed recently. If any viable populations remain, they will be located in the Green River of Kentucky.

== General summary ==
The ring pink mussel (Obovaria retusa) is also referred to as the "golf stick pearly mussel" or "ring pink". Ring Pink mussels are freshwater bivalves. They are in the river mussel family Unionidae. Ring pink mussels are native to the eastern and southeastern regions of the United States. They are currently found in Alabama, Kentucky, and Tennessee. The U.S. Fish and Wildlife Service listed the ring pink mussel as an endangered species under the Endangered Species Act in 1989. The species is still listed as endangered.

== Morphological description ==
The ring pink mussel was first described by the French naturalist Jean-Baptise Lamarck in 1819. This mussel has a medium to large shell. The shapes of its shells can range from oval to square. The exterior of the shell (periostracum) does not have rays and has a yellow-green to brown color. Usually, older individuals are darker brown or black. The inner layer of the shell (nacre) has a salmon to deep purple color and a white border.

== Life history ==
General freshwater mussel information supplements the current knowledge on the ring pink mussel. The ring pink mussel's life cycle and history are not well known.

For freshwater mussels, males discharge their sperm into the water column. Females take their sperm in through their gills to fertilize the eggs. In typical freshwater mussel life cycles, the larvae develop into a life stage called glochidia. Pregnant females release glochidia from their gills. After release, these glochidia attach to the gills or scales of freshwater fish. Once attached to the fish, the larvae act as parasites for weeks to months. It is unknown if the ring pink mussel utilizes a specific fish species or is more generalist in their attachment. This parasitic attachment to the host fish determines their population distribution. During this time as a parasite they metamorphosize into juvenile mussels. Afterwards, they detach from their fish host. The juvenile mussels sink to the benthos and settle as free-living mussels. It takes an average of 2–9 years for a freshwater mussel to reach reproductive maturity. In some freshwater species, they may only spawn once in 7 years. The average lifespan of a freshwater mussel ranges from 60 – 70 years.

Ring pink mussels pregnant with glochidia have been observed in late August. Ring pink glochidia have been described as "rather large and hookless".

Overall, ring pink mussels and other freshwater mussels are long-lived organisms. They exhibit ovoviviparous reproduction and reach sexual maturity at a late stage. They have a low frequency of successful reproduction events.

== Ecology ==
=== Diet ===
The ring pink mussel's specific diet is unknown. Its diet likely does not differ from the diet of other freshwater mussels. Freshwater mussels' diets often comprise detritus, diatoms, phytoplankton, and zooplankton.

=== Behavior ===
Little is known about the ring pink's reproductive behavior. Ring pink mussel mating is thought to resemble that of other freshwater mussels. Freshwater mussels typically exhibit burrowing behavior in juvenile stages. See Life History section for more information. Since the ring pink mussel is a rare species, there have been few reports of its behavior in the wild.

=== Habitat ===
The ring pink mussel is found in medium to large rivers. They inhabit the silt, sand, and gravel substrate of these rivers. The ring pink does not frequent habitats deeper than about one meter.

=== Range ===
Historically, the ring pink mussel was native to the Ohio River and its tributaries in Pennsylvania, West Virginia, Ohio, Indiana, Illinois, Kentucky, Tennessee, and Alabama. Its range has decreased due to damming. The Ring Pink mussel is currently found or believed to be found in Alabama, Tennessee, and Kentucky.

== Conservation ==
=== Population size ===
Construction of dams on large rivers has caused declining numbers of the ring pink. In the ring pink mussel 1991 recovery plan, five known populations of ring pink mussels were reported. However, few sightings of the species have been noted since the early 1990s. In the past 15 years, only two live ring pink individuals have been observed. Both sightings were in the Green River in Kentucky. It is hard to find the mussel through typical surveying methods, so small populations of the ring pink may still exist.

The 1991 ring pink recovery plan noted that the five populations in existence were old and most likely non-reproducing. A recent review by the U.S. Fish and Wildlife Services asserts that no viable populations currently exist. Studies have shown that decreased densities of freshwater mussels may lead to decreased fertilization and reproduction, possibly explaining the sudden drop in species numbers. Seeing that there are no reproducing populations, it is unlikely that population size will increase.

=== Past and current geographical distribution ===
In the past, the ring pink mussel was widely distributed among the Ohio River and its tributaries. These rivers span Pennsylvania, West Virginia, Ohio, Illinois, Indiana, Kentucky, Tennessee, and Alabama. By 1991, only five populations of the ring pink mussel were known and occurred in Kentucky, Tennessee, and West Virginia. Since 1998, there have only been four sightings of the ring pink at the Green River in Kentucky. As of 2019, it is believed that a small population of ring pinks in the Green River is the only population in existence. There is some speculation that ring pink individuals may occur in the Cumberland and Tennessee Rivers as well.

=== Major threats and human impact ===
The ring pink mussel is thought to be sensitive to habitat degradation. In the 1991 Ring Pink Recovery Plan, the U.S. Fish and Wildlife Services cite dam construction as a major cause of Ring Pink endangerment. Dam construction reduces the availability of preferred gravel and sand habitat for the Ring Pink. Dams also disrupt the life cycle of the ring pink mussel by limiting the availability of host fish for Ring Pink larvae. Gravel dredging and channel maintenance also contribute to habitat loss for the Ring Pink mussel.

Besides habitat destruction, commercial mussel fishing also poses a threat to the Ring Pink mussel. The mussel is sometimes taken during commercial mussel fishing of other species.

== Listing under the ESA ==
As of September 29, 1989, the species is listed as endangered under the Endangered Species Act. It was also listed as a small experimental, non-essential population established on October 15, 2007, in some portions of the French Broad River and Holston River in Tennessee.

== 5-year reviews ==
The U.S. Fish and Wildlife Services has completed and published two 5-year reviews. These reviews determine species status and recovery achievements. The U.S. Fish and Wildlife Services publicly announced a review of the Ring Pink Mussel on November 6, 1991. This document provided no in-depth evaluation of species' recovery, and no 5-year review was published in the decade after this notification.

Another review was published in 2011. The review conducted a five-factor analysis of threats to the ring pink's habitat. Habitat threats include overutilization, disease, predation, regulations, and other anthropogenic and natural factors affecting its existence. Only three individuals had been found between 1998 and 2011. Based on these results, the 2011 5-year review asserted that the ring pink should remain an endangered species.

Another public notice of a 5-year review was announced on June 20, 2017, in the Federal Register. This review was published in 2019. This review presented a similar five-factor analysis and stated no need for change in listing.

Both reviews assert there is a high threat to the ring pink species. Experts consider recovery potential as low. See "Recovery Plan" section for more information on recommendations for future action.

== Species Status Assessment ==
No Species Status Assessments are currently available for this species.

== Recovery Plan ==
The aim of the U.S. Fish and Wildlife Recovery Plan is to downlist the ring pink mussel from endangered to threatened. Total recovery is not thought to be possible. The downlisting date cannot be estimated at this time. Mussels do not reproduce until about age 5. More than 10 years are needed to document reproduction and assess viability. Experts must study the impact of commercial fisheries. Some river beaches may need to be declared mussel sanctuaries. Recommendations for future actions acknowledge the limited success in finding individuals. Experts could perform surveys in the Tennessee and Cumberland rivers to find sites with suitable habitat. One suggestion was to determine the fish host(s) of the ring pink and propagate the species. This way, propagated juveniles could be moved to areas with mussel assemblages. The round hickorynut, another mollusk that could be considered a potential proxy, is hosted by the eastern sand darter (Ammocrypta pellucida). This may indicate that the ring pink's host is the western sand darter (Ammocrypta clara) and/or Ammocrypta pellucida. Another suggestion is to begin studies in cryopreservation. This could preserve gametes and glochidia, since it is challenging to induce natural reproduction.

== Responsible parties ==
Kentucky Ecological Services Field Office, National Park Service, U.S. Forest Service, Indiana Department of Natural Resources, Tennessee Valley Authority, Tennessee Wildlife Resources Agency, Tennessee Department of Conservation, Fish and Wildlife Enhancement, Illinois Department of Conservation, Kentucky Department of Fish and Wildlife Resources, Kentucky State Nature Preserves Commission, Virginia Department of Game and Inland Fisheries, Kentucky Department for Surface Mining Reclamation and Enforcement, US Office of Surface Mining Reclamation and Enforcement, West Virginia Department of Natural Resources, USFWS Regional Office 5, USFWS Regional Office 3, USFWS Regional Office 4
