= Hobbseus cristatus =

Conservation status
- Data Deficient (IUCN 3.1)

- Imperiled (NatureServe)

Scientific classification
- Kingdom: Animalia
- Phylum: Arthropoda
- Class: Malacostraca
- Order: Decapoda
- Suborder: Pleocyemata
- Family: Cambaridae
- Genus: Hobbseus
- Species: H. cristatus

Binomial name
- Hobbseus cristatus (Hobbs, 1955)

Species of crayfish

Hobbseus cristatus, the Crested Riverlet Crayfish, is a species of crayfish in the family Cambaridae. It is endemic to Mississippi in the United States.
