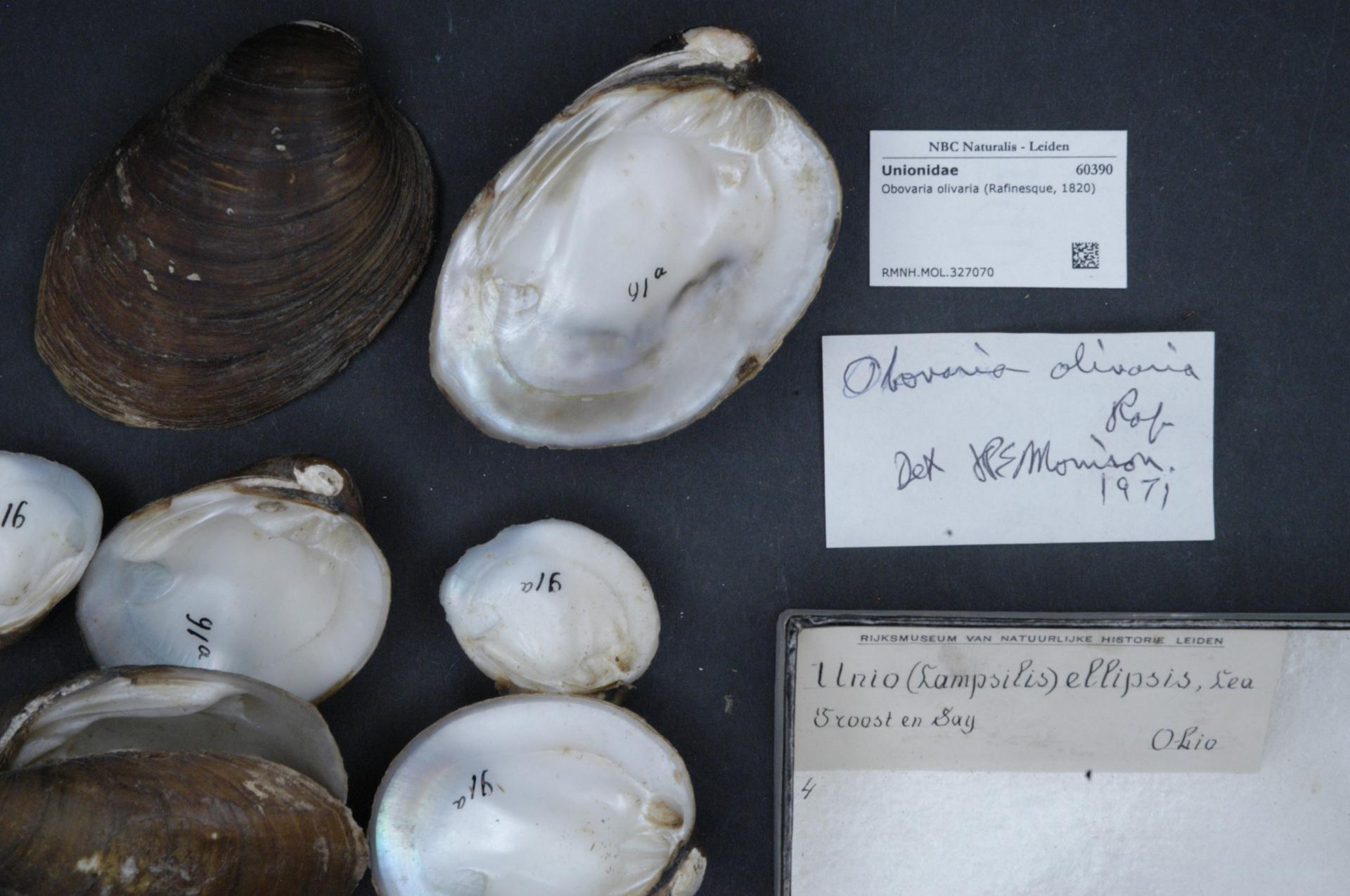

Conservation status
- Least Concern (IUCN 3.1)

- Apparently Secure (NatureServe)

Scientific classification
- Kingdom: Animalia
- Phylum: Mollusca
- Class: Bivalvia
- Order: Unionida
- Family: Unionidae
- Genus: Obovaria
- Species: O. olivaria

Binomial name
- Obovaria olivaria (Rafinesque, 1820)

Synonyms
- List: Amblema olivaria Rafinesque, 1820; Amblema olivaria subsp. dilatata Rafinesque, 1820; Amblema olivaria subsp. fasciolaris Rafinesque, 1820; Margarita (Unio) ellipsis (I.Lea, 1827); Margaron (Unio) ellipsis (I.Lea, 1827); Obovaria (Pseudoon) ellipsis (I.Lea, 1827); Unio ellipsis I.Lea, 1827; Unio pealei I.Lea, 1871

= Obovaria olivaria =

Species of bivalve, freshwater mussel

Obovaria olivaria is a species of freshwater mussel, an aquatic bivalve mollusk in the family Unionidae, the river mussels. It is commonly referred to as hickorynut.

The species is native to eastern North America. It is found in the drainages of the Ohio River, the St. Lawrence River, and the Great Lakes. It is known to use only sturgeons as larval hosts.

Although the species is considered of least concern by the IUCN, it is considered endangered across much of its native habitat. The species is especially threatened near the Great Lakes and in Canada. According to NatureServe, the hickorynut is presumed to be extirpated in Kansas, Alabama and Ohio and may have been extirpated from Nebraska and Pennsylvania.
