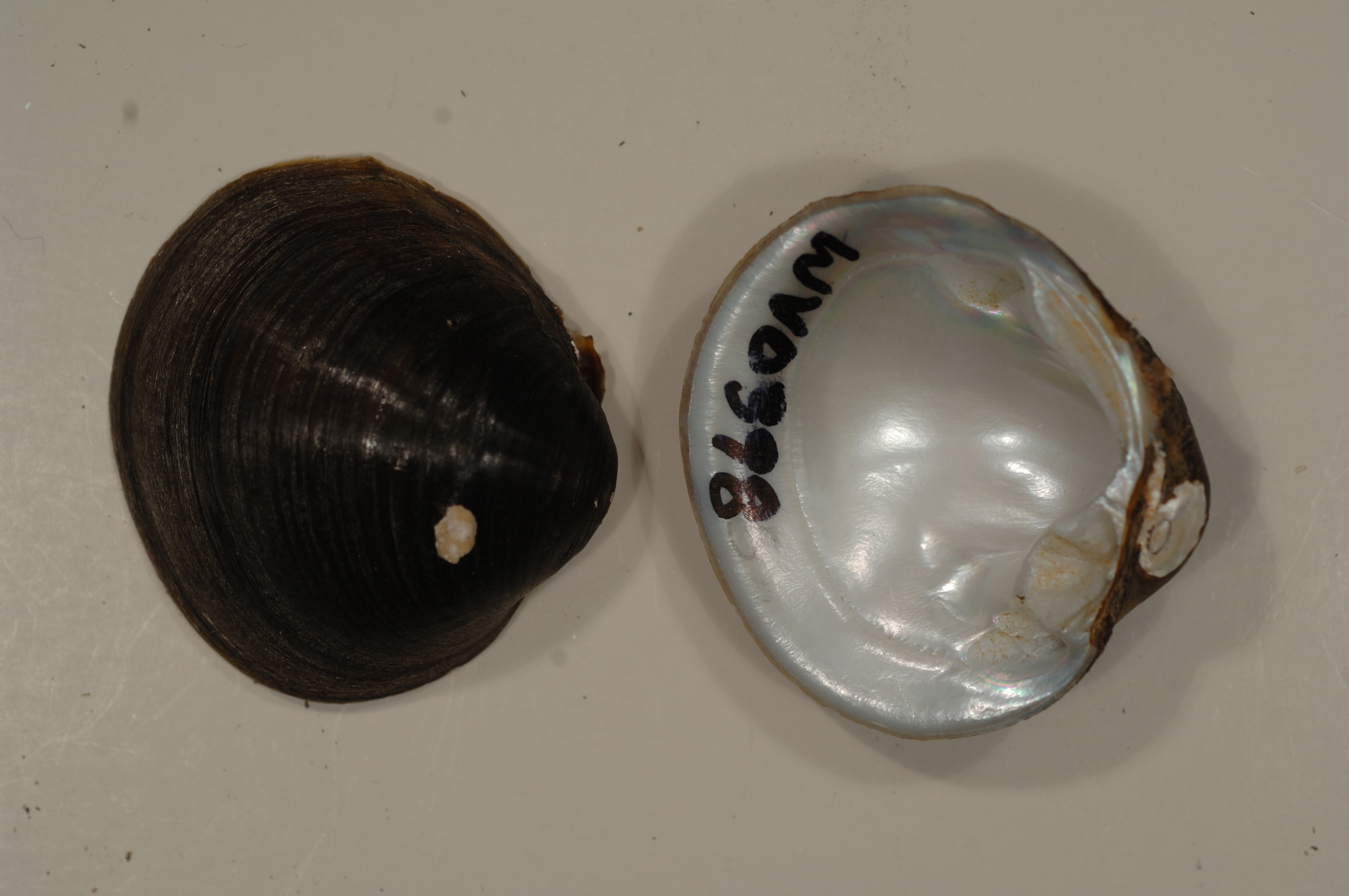

Conservation status
- Near Threatened (IUCN 2.3)

- Imperiled (NatureServe)

Scientific classification
- Kingdom: Animalia
- Phylum: Mollusca
- Class: Bivalvia
- Order: Unionida
- Family: Unionidae
- Genus: Obovaria
- Species: O. unicolor

Binomial name
- Obovaria unicolor I. Lea, 1845

= Obovaria unicolor =

Species of bivalve

Obovaria unicolor is a species of freshwater mussel, an aquatic bivalve mollusk in the family Unionidae, the river mussels. This mussel has a round or elliptical shape.

This species is endemic to the United States.
