= Creaserinus gilpini =

Conservation status
- Near Threatened (IUCN 3.1)

- Imperiled (NatureServe)

Scientific classification
- Kingdom: Animalia
- Phylum: Arthropoda
- Class: Malacostraca
- Order: Decapoda
- Suborder: Pleocyemata
- Family: Cambaridae
- Genus: Creaserinus
- Species: C. gilpini

Binomial name
- Creaserinus gilpini (Hobbs, Jr. & Robison, 1989)

Synonyms
- Fallicambarus gilpini

Species of crayfish

Creaserinus gilpini, the Jefferson County crayfish, is a species of crayfish in the family Cambaridae. It is endemic to Arkansas.

The IUCN conservation status of Creaserinus gilpini is "NT", near threatened. The species may be considered threatened in the near future. The IUCN status was reviewed in 2010.
