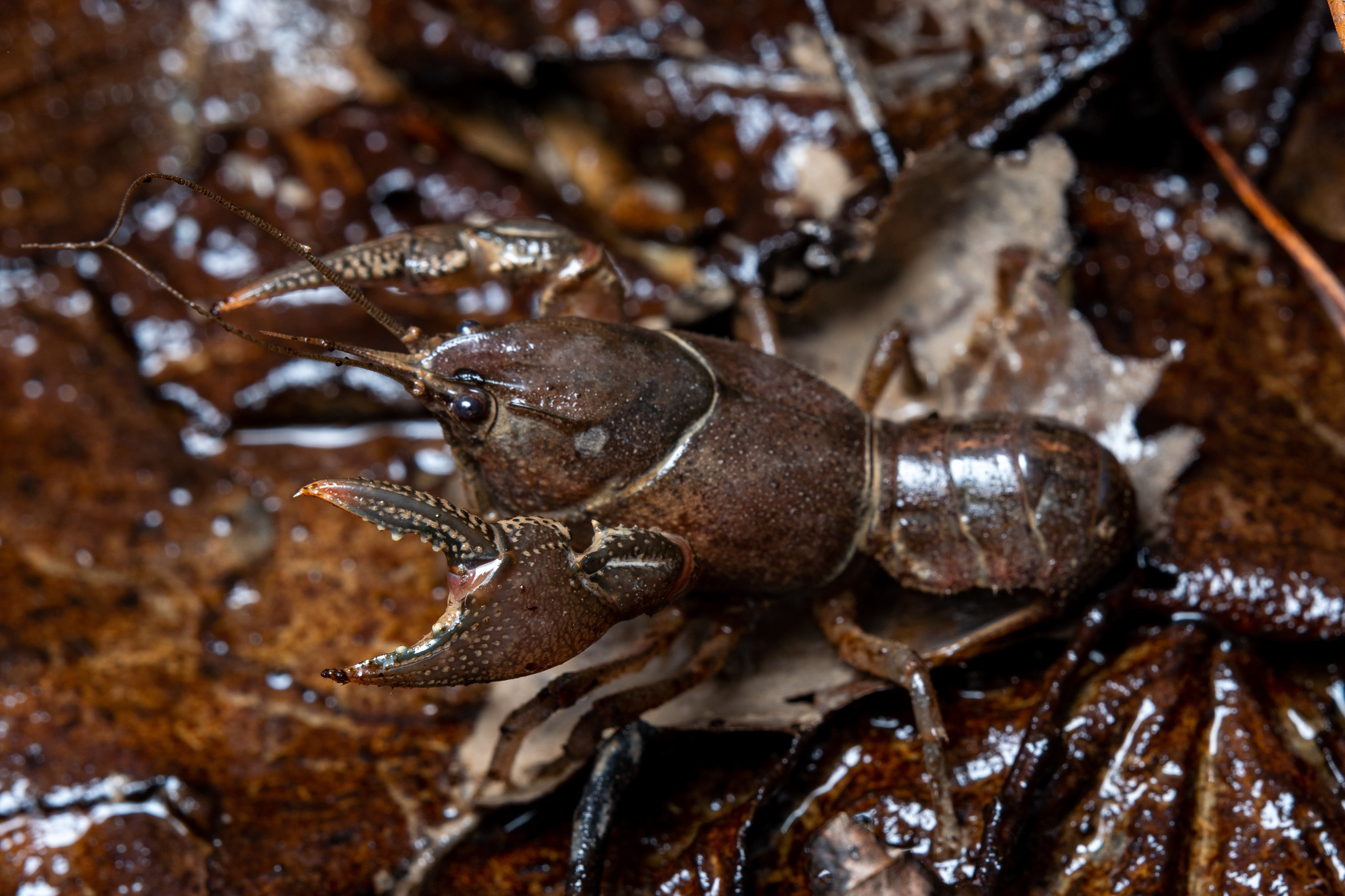
- Creaserinus fodiens, digger crayfish, Louisiana

Scientific classification
- Domain: Eukaryota
- Kingdom: Animalia
- Phylum: Arthropoda
- Class: Malacostraca
- Order: Decapoda
- Suborder: Pleocyemata
- Family: Cambaridae
- Genus: Creaserinus; Hobbs, 1973

= Creaserinus =

Genus of crayfish

Creaserinus is a genus of Digger Crayfish in the family Cambaridae. There are about 15 described species in Creaserinus, found in North America.

This genus was formerly considered a subgenus of Fallicambarus.

== Species ==
The following species belong to the genus Creaserinus:

- Creaserinus brevistylus Johnson, Stern & Crandall, 2021
- Creaserinus burrisi (Fitzpatrick, 1987) (burrowing bog crayfish)
- Creaserinus byersi (Hobbs, 1941)
- Creaserinus caesius (Hobbs, 1975)
- Creaserinus clausus Johnson, Stern & Crandall, 2021
- Creaserinus crenastylus Johnson, Stern & Crandall, 2021
- Creaserinus danielae (Hobbs, 1975) (speckled burrowing crayfish)
- Creaserinus fodiens (Cottle, 1863) (digger crayfish)
- Creaserinus gilpini (Hobbs & Robison, 1989) (Jefferson County crayfish)
- Creaserinus gordoni (Fitzpatrick, 1987) (Camp Shelby burrowing crayfish)
- Creaserinus hedgpethi (Hobbs, 1948)
- Creaserinus hortoni (Hobbs & Fitzpatrick, 1970) (Hatchie burrowing crayfish)
- Creaserinus limulus Johnson, Stern & Crandall, 2021
- Creaserinus oryktes (Penn & Marlow, 1959)
- Creaserinus trinensis Johnson, Stern & Crandall, 2021
