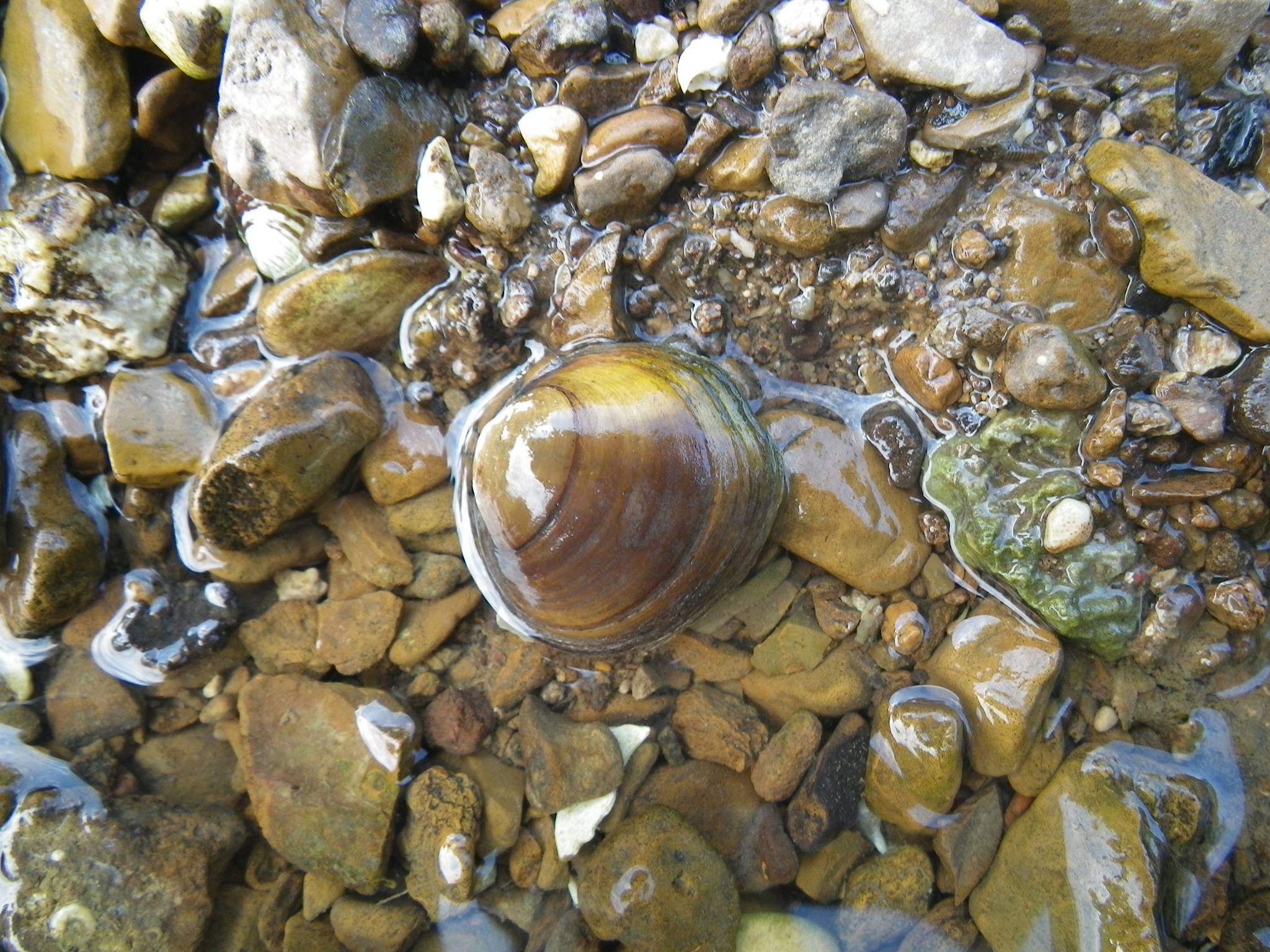

Conservation status
- Endangered (IUCN 3.1)

- Vulnerable (NatureServe)

Scientific classification
- Kingdom: Animalia
- Phylum: Mollusca
- Class: Bivalvia
- Order: Unionida
- Family: Unionidae
- Genus: Obovaria
- Species: O. subrotunda

Binomial name
- Obovaria subrotunda (Rafinesque, 1820)

Synonyms
- List: Lampsilis orbiculata (Hildreth, 1828); Obovaria subrotunda subsp. lens (Lea, 1831); Obliquaria subrotunda Rafinesque, 1820; Unio zonalis Rafinesque, 1820; Unio levigata Rafinesque, 1820; Obovaria striata Rafinesque, 1820; Unio orbiculatus Hildreth, 1828; Unio rotundus Wood, 1828; Unio circulus Lea, 1829; Unio lens Lea, 1831; Unio leibii Lea, 1862; Unio depygis Conrad, 1866; Obovaria striata subsp. tuberculata Rafinesque, 1820; Obovaria striata subsp. rosea Rafinesque, 1820; Obovaria lens subsp. parva Simpson, 1914; Obovaria lens subsp. elongata Simpson, 1914; Obovaria subrotunda subsp. globula Morrison, 1942

= Obovaria subrotunda =

Species of bivalve

Obovaria subrotunda, commonly called the round hickorynut, is a species of freshwater mussel, an aquatic bivalve mollusk in the family Unionidae, the river mussels.

== Distribution and conservation status ==
This species is native to eastern North America.

The Canadian Species at Risk Act listed it in the List of Wildlife Species at Risk as being endangered in Canada.

It was listed federally as a threatened species of the United States under the Endangered Species Act in 2023.
