= Fallicambarus petilicarpus =

Conservation status
- Endangered (IUCN 3.1)

Scientific classification
- Domain: Eukaryota
- Kingdom: Animalia
- Phylum: Arthropoda
- Class: Malacostraca
- Order: Decapoda
- Suborder: Pleocyemata
- Family: Cambaridae
- Genus: Fallicambarus
- Species: F. petilicarpus

Binomial name
- Fallicambarus petilicarpus Hobbs, Jr. & Robison, 1989

Species of crayfish

Fallicambarus petilicarpus, the slenderwrist burrowing crayfish, is a species of crayfish in the family Cambaridae. It is found in southern Arkansas and northern Louisiana.

The IUCN conservation status of Fallicambarus petilicarpus is "EN", endangered. The species faces a high risk of extinction in the near future. The IUCN status was reviewed in 2010.
