= Creaserinus clausus =

Scientific classification
- Kingdom: Animalia
- Phylum: Arthropoda
- Class: Malacostraca
- Order: Decapoda
- Suborder: Pleocyemata
- Family: Cambaridae
- Genus: Creaserinus
- Species: C. clausus

Binomial name
- Creaserinus clausus Johnson, Stern, and Crandall, 2021

Species of crayfish

Creaserinus clausus is a species of cambarid crayfish endemic to the southern US states of Texas and Louisiana.
