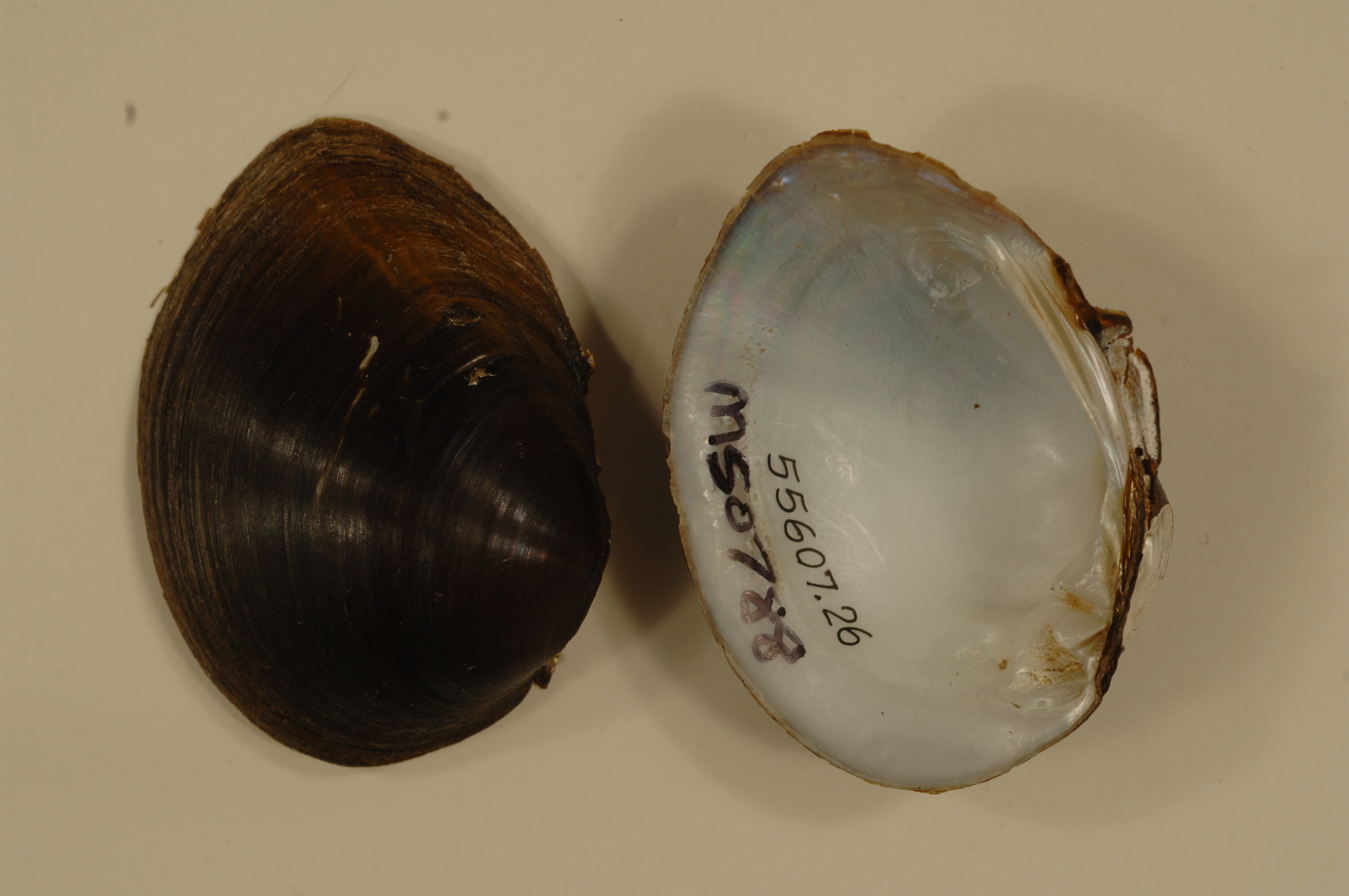

Conservation status
- Vulnerable (NatureServe)

Scientific classification
- Kingdom: Animalia
- Phylum: Mollusca
- Class: Bivalvia
- Order: Unionida
- Family: Unionidae
- Genus: Obovaria
- Species: O. arkansasensis

Binomial name
- Obovaria arkansasensis (Lea, 1862)

Synonyms
- Unio arkansasensis Lea, 1862; Unio (Obovaria) jacksoniana Frierson, 1912; Unio castaneus Lea, 1831; Lampsilis arkansensis Frierson, 1927; Villosa arkansasensis (Lea, 1862)

= Obovaria arkansasensis =

Species of bivalve

Obovaria arkansasensis, the Southern Hickorynut, is a species of freshwater mussel, an aquatic bivalve mollusc in the family Unionidae, the river mussels. It lives in the southern United States, and has a complex life history including its larvae being parasitic on a fish host.

== Description ==
The Ouachita creekshell grows to about 5 centimetres (2.0 in) in length. The shell is thin but has robust hinge teeth, especially at the anterior end. There are sometimes a few fine ribs on the posterior end of the shell. The periostracum is olive or yellowish-brown. This species is dimorphic with the males being ovate and the females being less compressed laterally and with the posterior end truncated and sometimes with a notch on the posterior margin.

Obovaria arkansasensis shows great similarity in general appearance to Obovaria jacksoniana. However, its shell morphology and life cycle are different, as are the species of host fish with which it is associated. The latter is sometimes considered a synonym of Obovaria arkansasensis.

== Distribution and habitat ==
The Ouachita creekshell is found at about 30 sites in small and medium-sized streams in the Ouachita Mountains in south west Arkansas. It is restricted to the headwaters of the Ouachita River and the Saline River drainage systems including the Caddo River and Little Missouri River. It is found buried in the sand or gravel at the bottom of riffles and glides and sometimes slower moving stretches of water, but not in lakes.

== Biology ==
Ouachita creekshells are filter feeders and orient themselves with their siphons upstream. They tend to remain buried in the sediment sometimes with their posterior ends uncovered. The females come to the surface when the weather warms up in spring in order to release their larvae.

Like other fresh water mussels in the family Unionidae, the Ouachita creekshell has a complex life history involving a larval stage known as a glochidium which attaches itself to the gill, fin or skin of a suitable host fish. The actual host fishes used by Ouachita creekshells are unknown but suitability trials in the laboratory showed that the shadow bass (Ambloplites ariommus) might be the primary host and that other possible hosts include the Creole darter (Etheostoma collettei), the greenside darter (Etheostoma blennioides) and the green sunfish (Lepomis cyanellus). The female Ouachita creekshell produces a lure for potential host fish consisting of movements of papillae on the foot creating a wave action of the mantle. Fish that investigate this get showered in glochidia which have been brooded within the mussel's mantle cavity over the winter period. The glochidia encyst on the surface of the fish and feed on fish tissue for several weeks. They undergo metamorphosis while encysted before dropping off the host and settling on the stream bed as juvenile creekshells. The fish are unharmed by this process.

== Status ==
The Ouachita creekshell is endemic to Arkansas and is classified as a S2 species. This means that it is of special concern as it is very rare, either having fewer than 20 localities at which it is found or having a small number of individuals at only a very few locations. In either case, it is in danger of extinction. When considering how to conserve the mussel, the management of suitable host fish is important. The chief threat to both is habitat destruction and degradation. The impoundment of waters by damming streams restricts fish movement and causes increased sedimentation below the dam and has a deleterious effect on mussel populations. Competition from the introduced species of mussel, Corbicula fluminea, may also be a cause for concern.
