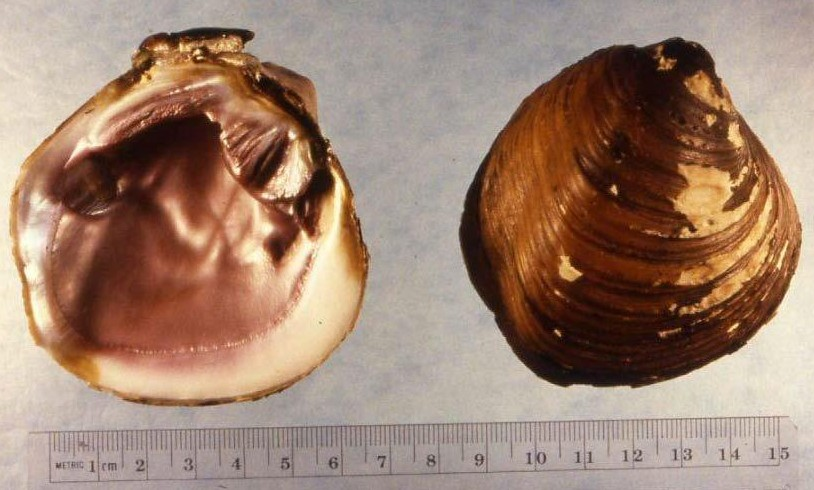
- Obovaria retusa

Scientific classification
- Kingdom: Animalia
- Phylum: Mollusca
- Class: Bivalvia
- Order: Unionida
- Family: Unionidae
- Tribe: Lampsilini
- Genus: Obovaria; Rafinesque, 1819

Species
- 6+ recognized species, see article

= Obovaria =

Genus of bivalves

Obovaria is a genus of freshwater mussels, aquatic bivalve mollusks in the family Unionidae, the river mussels. There are at least six described species in Obovaria at present, all of which are found in the United States. Obovaria subrotunda is found in Canada as well.

== Species ==
- Obovaria arkansasensis (I. Lea, 1862)
- Obovaria haddletoni (Athearn, 1964) (Haddleton lampmussel), (Critically Endangered)
- Obovaria jacksoniana (Frierson, 1912) (Southern hickorynut)
- Obovaria olivaria (Rafinesque, 1820) (Hickorynut)

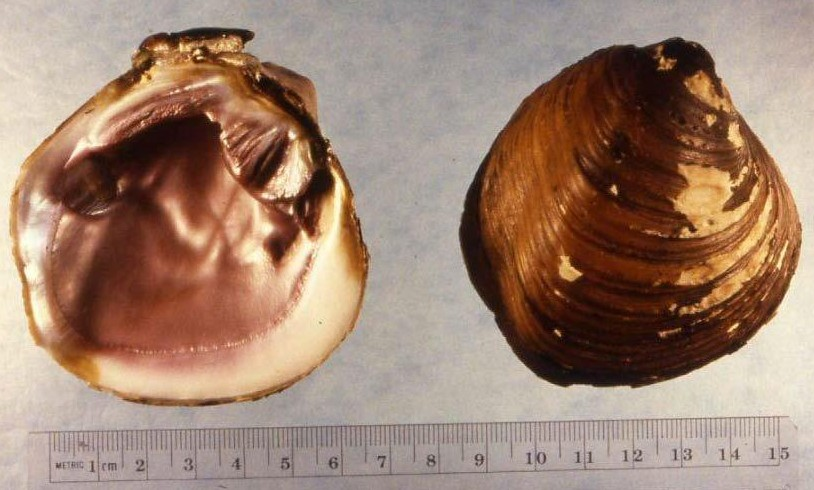
Obovaria retusa

- Obovaria retusa (Lamarck, 1819) (Golf stick pearly mussel or ring pink mussel), (Critically Endangered)
- Obovaria subrotunda (Rafinesque, 1820) (Round hickorynut)
- Obovaria unicolor (Lea, 1845) (Alabama hickorynut)
