= Hobbseus prominens =

Conservation status
- Least Concern (IUCN 3.1)

- Apparently Secure (NatureServe)

Scientific classification
- Kingdom: Animalia
- Phylum: Arthropoda
- Class: Malacostraca
- Order: Decapoda
- Suborder: Pleocyemata
- Family: Cambaridae
- Genus: Hobbseus
- Species: H. prominens

Binomial name
- Hobbseus prominens (Hobbs, 1966)

Species of crayfish

Hobbseus prominens, the Prominence Riverlet Crayfish, is a species of crayfish in the family Cambaridae found in Mississippi and Alabama.
