= Arkansas Highway 290 =

State highway in Arkansas, United States

Highway 290
- AR 290 highlighted in red

Route information
- Maintained by ArDOT
- Length: 10.06 mi (16.19 km)

Major junctions
- West end: AR 7 at Lake Hamilton
- AR 128 from Lake Hamilton to Red Oak
- East end: AR 171 near Lake Catherine State Park

Location
- Country: United States
- State: Arkansas
- Counties: Garland

Highway system
- Arkansas Highway System; Interstate; US; State; Business; Spurs; Suffixed; Scenic; Heritage
← AR 289	→ AR 291

Arkansas Highway 290 (AR 290) is an east–west state highway in Garland County, Arkansas. The route of 10.06 miles (16.19 km) runs from Highway 7 at Lake Hamilton east to Highway 171 west of Lake Catherine State Park.

== Route description ==
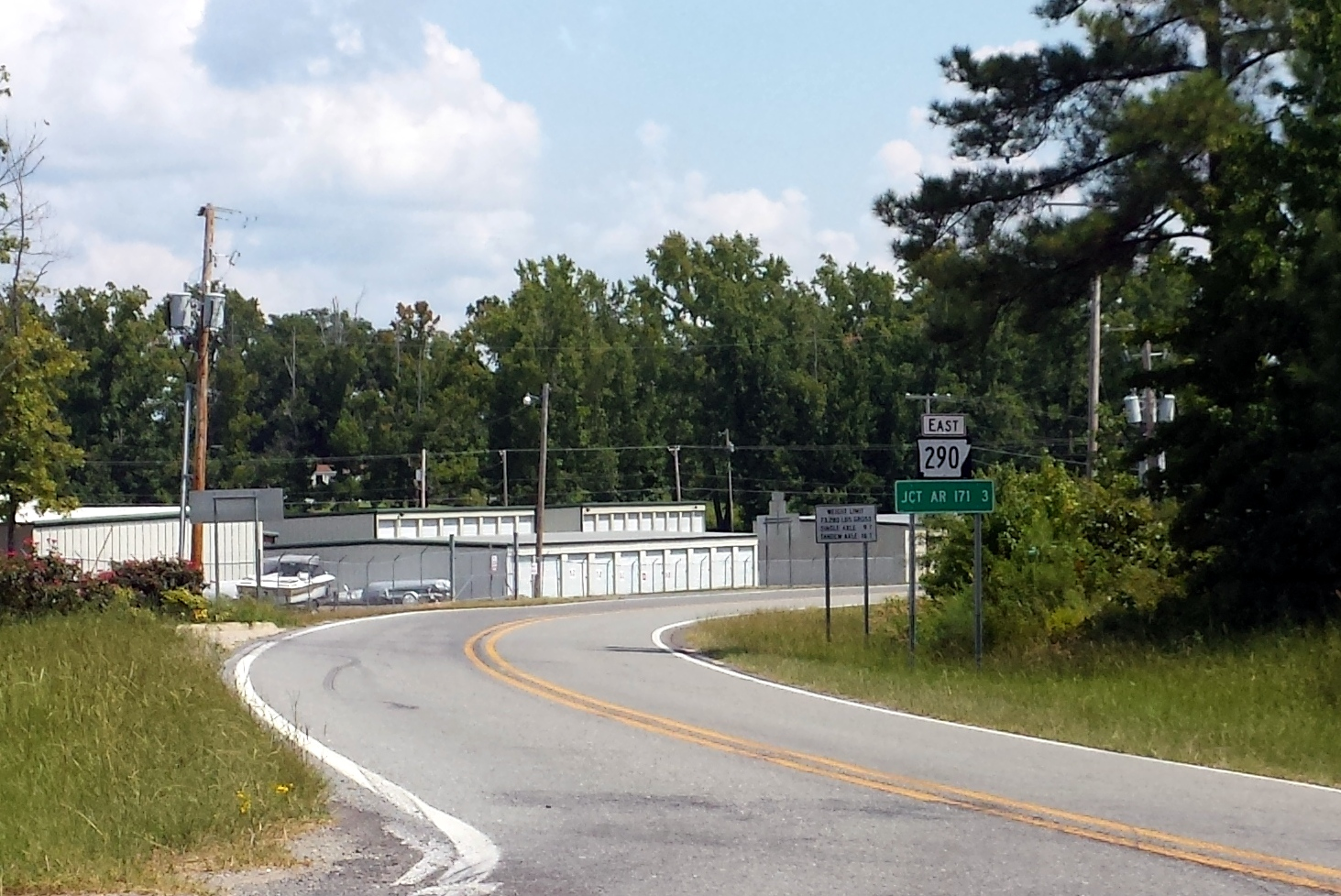
Highway 290 near Highway 128 south of Hot Springs

Highway 290 begins at Highway 7 in south Garland County at Lake Hamilton and runs east. The route begins a concurrency with Highway 128 and continues east to give access to boat ramps and docks. After serving the unincorporated community of Red Oak, Highway 128 splits off to the north towards Hot Springs. Highway 290 continues east to Highway 171, where it terminates west of Lake Catherine State Park.

== Major intersections ==
The entire route is in Garland County.

Location	mi	km	Destinations	Notes
Lake Hamilton	0.00	0.00	AR 7 – Arkadelphia, Hot Springs	Western terminus
	2.32	3.73	AR 128 south – Caney	Western end of AR 128 concurrency
	6.53	10.51	AR 128 north – Hot Springs	Eastern end of AR 128 concurrency
	10.06	16.19	AR 171 – Diamondhead, Malvern, Lake Catherine State Park	Eastern terminus
1.000 mi = 1.609 km; 1.000 km = 0.621 mi: Concurrency terminus

== See also ==
- List of state highways in Arkansas
