= Diamondhead, Arkansas =

- City
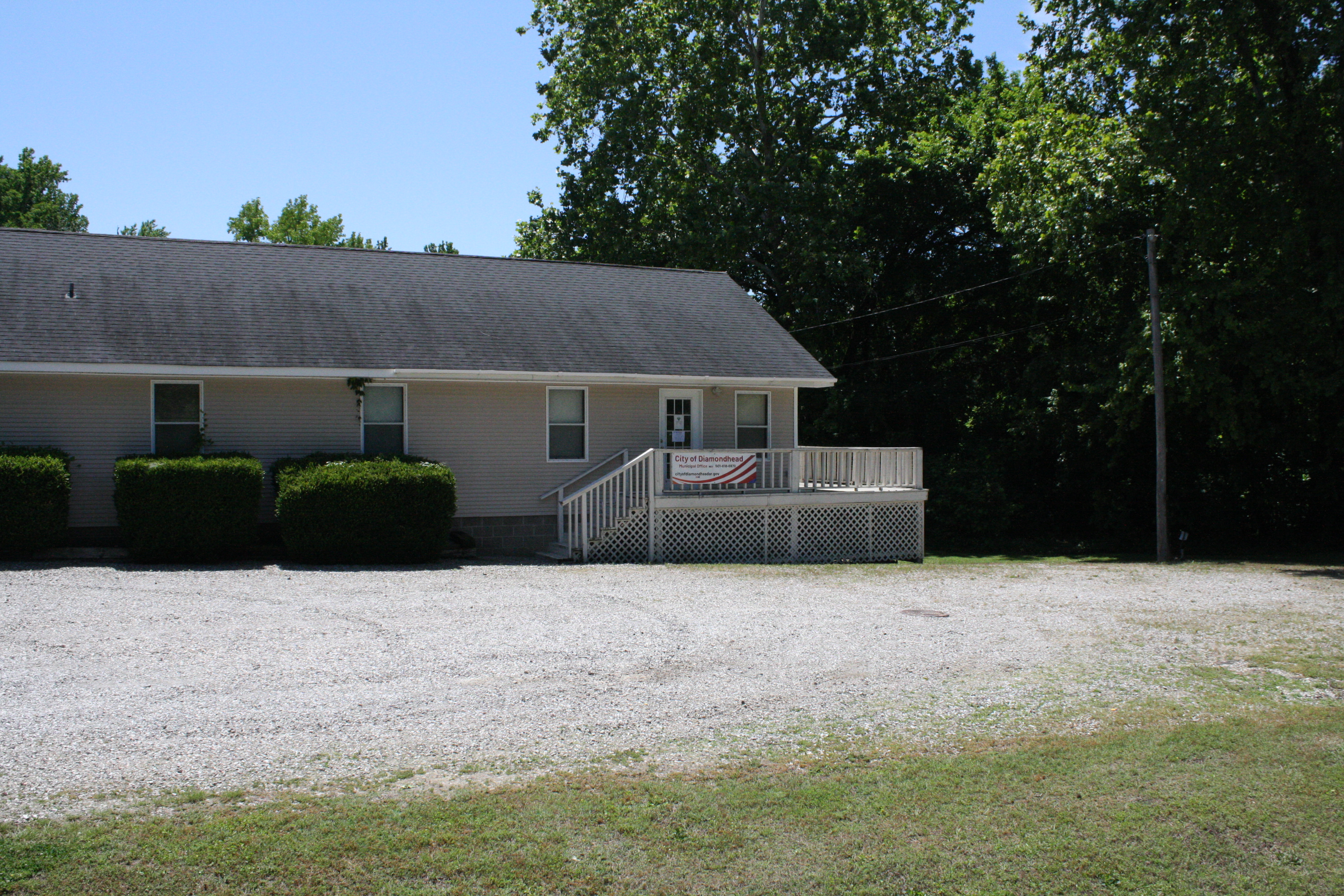
- City of Diamondhead Municipal Office
- Interactive map of Diamondhead, Arkansas
- Coordinates: 34°26′9.28″N 92°57′30.10″W
- Country: United States
- State: Arkansas
- County: Garland, Hot Spring
- Established: 2024

Government
  - Type: Mayor-council
  - Mayor: Ralph Carruth
- Elevation: 423 ft (129 m)

Population (2020)
  - Total: 914
  - Estimate (2025): 893
- Time zone: UTC-6 (Central (CST))
  - Summer (DST): UTC-5 (CDT)
- ZIP code: 71658
- Area code: 501
- GNIS feature ID: 2832398
- Website: www.cityofdiamondheadar.gov

Diamondhead is a city in Garland and Hot Spring County, Arkansas, United States. Established as a 2,300 acres (930 ha) gated retirement community with golf course and other amenities, residents voted to incorporate in 2024. Diamondhead is located on Lake Catherine, adjacent to Lake Catherine State Park, and within the Hot Springs–Malvern Combined Statistical Area.

== Geography ==
Diamondhead is located in the Ouachita Mountains of Southwest Arkansas near the transition into the Piney Woods. Within the Ouachitas, the city is located near the eastern limits of a subdivision called the central mountain ranges, a Level IV ecoregion designated by the USEPA. The area is dominated by east-west trending ridges that are characteristically steep and rugged and underlain by resistant sandstone and novaculite (chert). Igneous intrusions occur along with associated hot springs. Rock outcrops, and shallow, stony soils are widespread. Novaculite glades occur. Potential natural vegetation is oak–hickory–pine forest. Perennial springs and seeps are common and support diverse vegetation. Constricted valleys between ridges have waterfalls and rapids. Surface waters have very low nutrient, mineral, and biochemical water quality concentrations and turbidity. Logging is not nearly as common as in the less rugged Athens Plateau.

== Education ==
The city is split between the Lakeside School District and Malvern School District along the county line.

== Infrastructure ==
=== Transportation ===
Two Arkansas state highways intersect in Diamondhead: Arkansas Highway 171 (AR 171) and AR 290.

=== Utilities ===
Sanitary sewer service is provided by the City of Hot Springs.
