= Fallicambarus strawni =

Conservation status
- Least Concern (IUCN 3.1)

Scientific classification
- Domain: Eukaryota
- Kingdom: Animalia
- Phylum: Arthropoda
- Class: Malacostraca
- Order: Decapoda
- Suborder: Pleocyemata
- Family: Cambaridae
- Genus: Fallicambarus
- Species: F. strawni

Binomial name
- Fallicambarus strawni (Reimer, 1966)

Species of crayfish

Fallicambarus strawni, the saline burrowing crayfish, is a species of crayfish in the family Cambaridae. It is found in southeastern Oklahoma and western Arkansas.

The IUCN conservation status of Fallicambarus strawni is "LC", least concern, with no immediate threat to the species' survival. The IUCN status was reviewed in 2010.
