= Wichita =

Wichita (/ˈwɪtʃɪtɔː, -tɑː/ WITCH-ih-taw, -tah) may refer to:

== People ==
- Wichita people, a Native American tribe
- Wichita language, the language of the tribe

== Places in the United States ==
- Wichita, Kansas, a city located in Sedgwick County
- Wichita County, Kansas, a county in western Kansas
- Wichita Falls, Texas, a city
- Wichita County, Texas
- Wichita Mountains

== In the military ==
- Wichita-class cruiser, a heavy cruiser class of the US Navy
  - USS Wichita (CA-45), the only ship of the class; active in World War II
- Wichita-class replenishment oiler, a class of US Navy oilers from the late 1960s to the mid-1990s
  - USS Wichita (AOR-1), the lead ship of the class; in service from 1969 to 1993
- Beechcraft AT-10 Wichita, a World War II trainer airplane for the United States Army Air Forces

== In entertainment ==
- Wichita (1955 film), a 1955 American Western movie directed by Jacques Tourneur
- Wichita, early title of a proposed movie, eventually made as Knight and Day starring Cameron Diaz and Tom Cruise
- Wichita Recordings, a London-based independent record label

== See also ==
- Ouachita (disambiguation)
- Washita (disambiguation)
