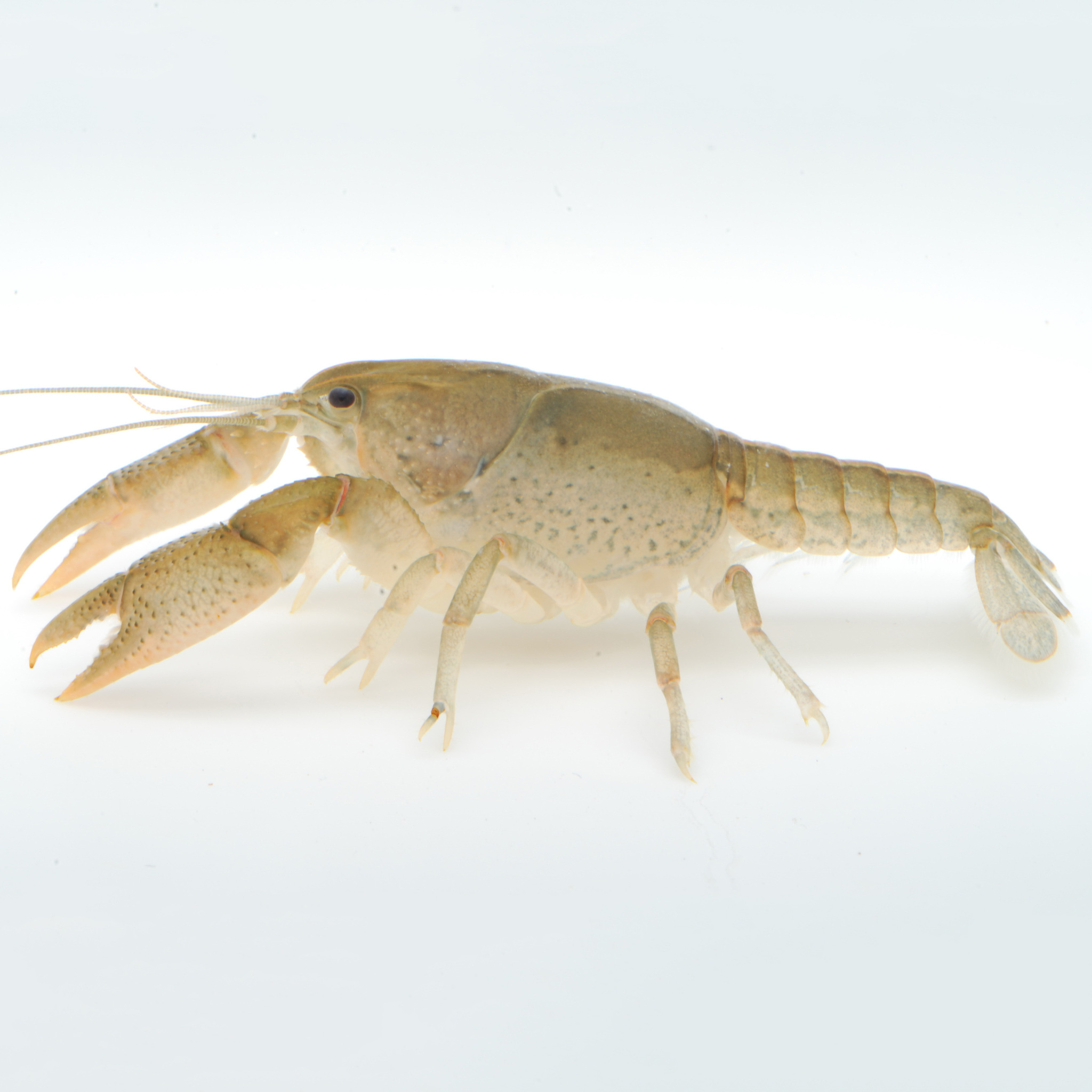
- Fallicambarus macneesei

Scientific classification
- Kingdom: Animalia
- Phylum: Arthropoda
- Class: Malacostraca
- Order: Decapoda
- Suborder: Pleocyemata
- Family: Cambaridae
- Genus: Fallicambarus; Hobbs, 1969

Type species
- Fallicambarus strawni Reimer, 1966

= Fallicambarus =

Genus of crayfishes

Fallicambarus is a genus of crayfish in the family Cambaridae from the United States and Canada. It includes 12 species, of which one is on the IUCN Red List as a vulnerable species (VU) and one as an endangered species (EN). The species of this genus are all restricted to three states or fewer, from Texas and Oklahoma east to Florida.

The subgenus Creaserinus formerly contained eight additional species of Fallicambarus, but has been elevated in rank to genus, resulting in the transfer of those species from Fallicambarus to Creaserinus.

== Species ==
These twelve species are members of the genus Fallicambarus.

- Fallicambarus devastator (Hobbs & Whiteman, 1987) – Texas
- Fallicambarus dissitus (Penn, 1955) (Pine Hills Digger) – Arkansas, Louisiana
- Fallicambarus harpi (Hobbs & Robison, 1985) (Ouachita burrowing crayfish) – Arkansas
- Fallicambarus houstonensis (Johnson, 2008) – Texas
- Fallicambarus jeanae (Hobbs, 1973) – Arkansas
- Fallicambarus kountzeae (Johnson, 2008) – Texas
- Fallicambarus macneesei (Black, 1967) (Old Prairie Digger) – Louisiana, Texas
- Fallicambarus petilicarpus (Hobbs & Robison, 1989) (slenderwrist burrowing crayfish) - Arkansas
- Fallicambarus schusteri (Taylor & Robison, 2016) - Oklahoma, Arkansas
- Fallicambarus strawni (Reimer, 1966) (Saline burrowing crayfish) – Arkansas
- Fallicambarus tenuis (Hobbs, 1950) (Ouachita Mountain crayfish) - Oklahoma, Arkansas
- Fallicambarus wallsi (Johnson, 2011) - Texas
