= Capt. Goodgame House =

Historic house in Arkansas, United States

- U.S. National Register of Historic Places
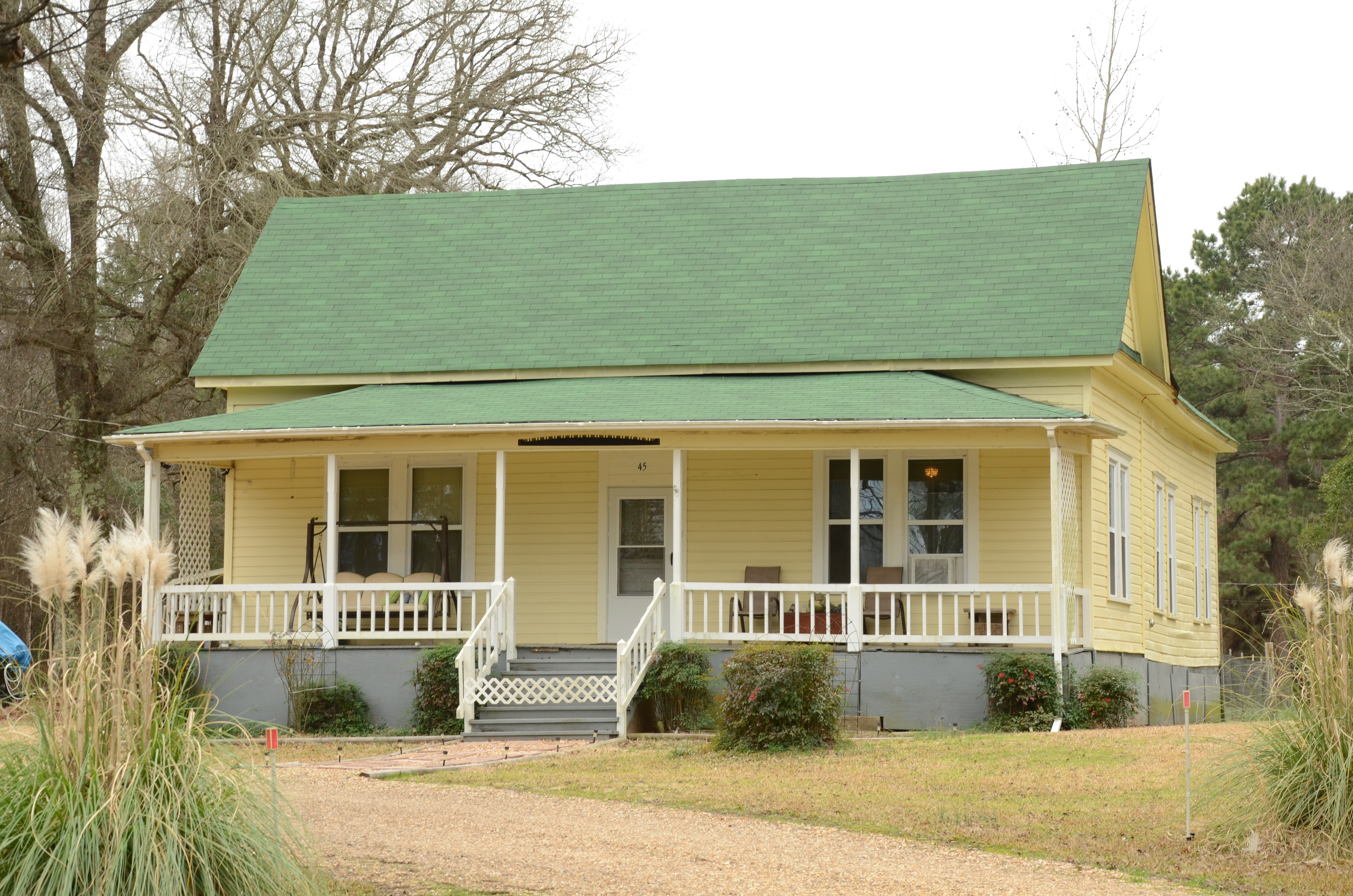

- Location within Arkansas Location within the United States
- Location: 45 Highway 128; Holly Springs, Arkansas 71763
- Coordinates: 33°49′11″N 92°42′52″W
- Area: less than one acre
- Built: 1918
- MPS: Dallas County MRA
- NRHP reference No.: 83003471
- Added to NRHP: October 28, 1983

The Capt. Goodgame House is a historic house at 45 Highway 128 in Holly Springs, Arkansas. Built in 1918, this single story wood-frame house is an unusual late and high quality example of a vernacular style of house architecture more typically seen in 19th century construction in the area. It has a gable roof, and is clad in novelty siding. A porch extends across the front facade, supported by plain chamfered posts. The gable ends of the roof are extended, with full pediments, and the door and window surrounds are more elaborate than are typically seen in the area. The interior of the house follows a standard central hall plan, but the detailing is again of a particularly high quality.

The house was listed on the National Register of Historic Places in 1983.

== See also ==
- National Register of Historic Places listings in Dallas County, Arkansas
