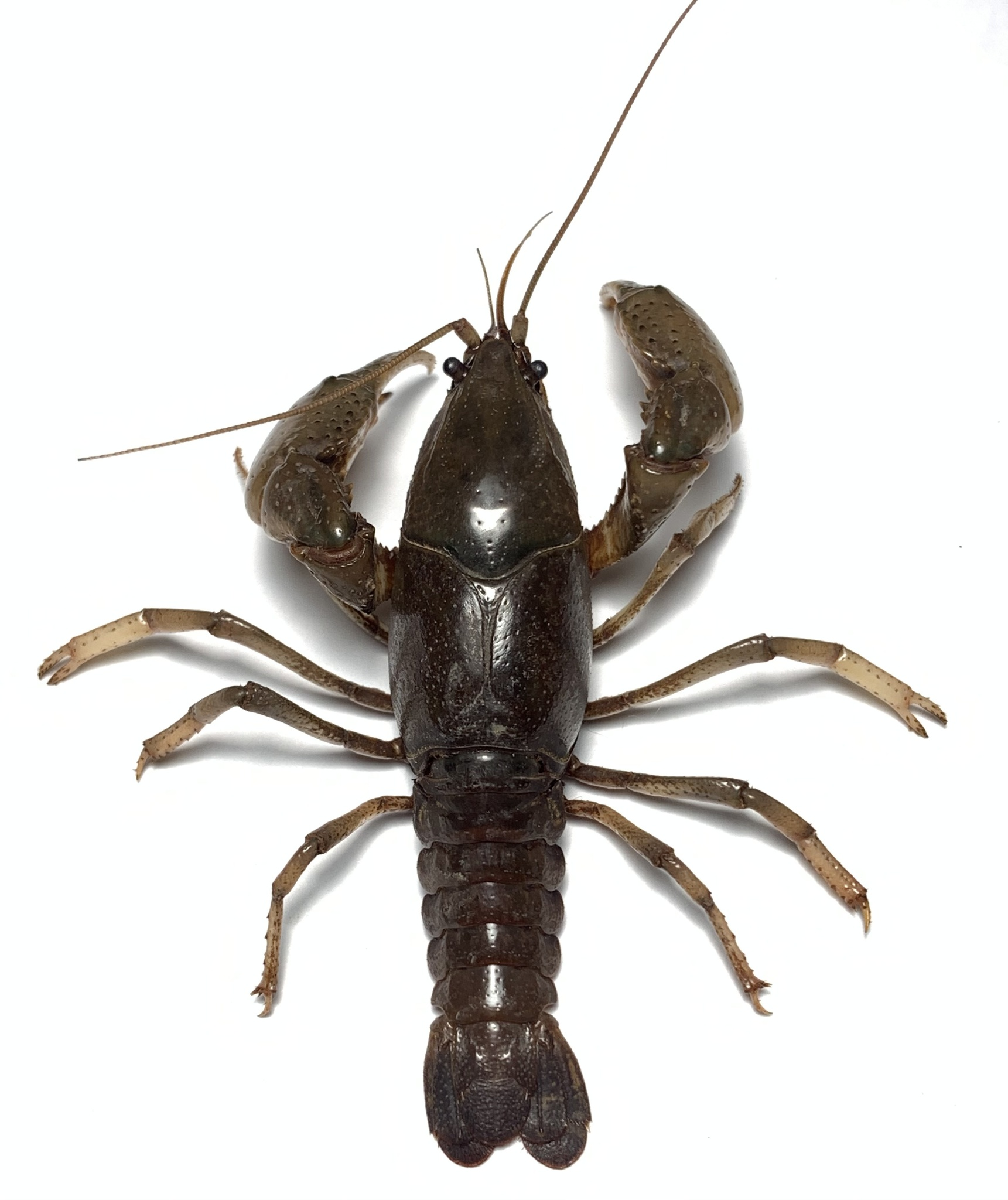

Conservation status
- Least Concern (IUCN 3.1)

- Imperiled (NatureServe)

Scientific classification
- Kingdom: Animalia
- Phylum: Arthropoda
- Class: Malacostraca
- Order: Decapoda
- Suborder: Pleocyemata
- Family: Cambaridae
- Genus: Fallicambarus
- Species: F. houstonensis

Binomial name
- Fallicambarus houstonensis Johnson, 2008

= Fallicambarus houstonensis =

Species of crayfish

Fallicambarus houstonensis, commonly known as the Houston burrowing crayfish, is a species of crayfish endemic to a select number of counties of southeastern Texas. This species is a primary burrower, as are all other known species of the Fallicambarus genus. Within its limited range, the species lives in abundance. Burrowing crayfish like F. houstonensis tend to thrive in warmer climates with milder and shorter winters. This species lives in semi-terrestrial habitats, sometimes far away from any established bodies of water.

== Description ==
The carapace of this species ranges from 35 to 27 mm (1.4 to 1.1 in) in length and is mostly brown in color, however, both solid and striped color patterns have been documented in mature individuals. The abdomen is narrower and slightly shorter than the cephalothorax.

== Taxonomy and naming ==
This species was described by Daniel P. Johnson in 2008 based on specimens from six counties in southeastern Texas, with the holotype being collected from Liberty County. It was given the specific epithet houstonensis after the city of Houston, located just south of this species' range. The holotype, allotype, and morphotype specimens were deposited in the National Museum of Natural History.
