= Brazeale Homestead =

- U.S. National Register of Historic Places
- U.S. Historic district
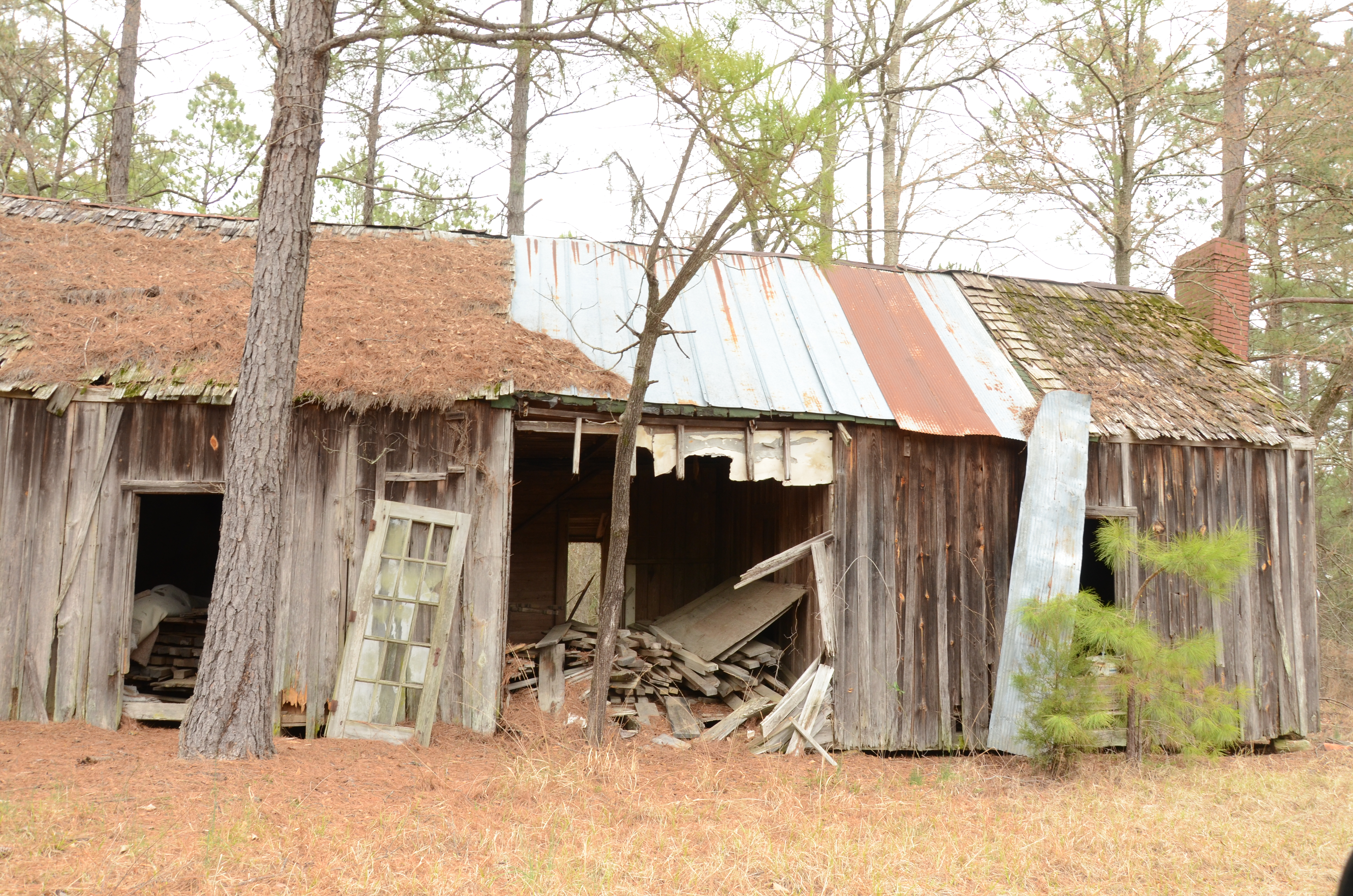
- Location: SE of AR 128, Pine Grove, Arkansas
- Area: 40 acres (16 ha)
- Built: 1853
- MPS: Dallas County MRA
- NRHP reference No.: 83003463
- Added to NRHP: October 28, 1983

The Brazeale Homestead is a historic farm complex off Arkansas Highway 128 in rural Dallas County, Arkansas. The oldest portion of its main house, built c. 1853 by Benjamin Brazeale, is one of only three documented dog trot houses in Dallas County. The entire complex, consisting of eleven structures, was developed between about 1850 and 1900, and includes the county's only surviving example of a double-crib driveway barn.

The farm complex was listed on the National Register of Historic Places in 1983.

== See also ==
- National Register of Historic Places listings in Dallas County, Arkansas
