= Arkansas Highway 171 =

State highway in Arkansas, United States

Highway 171

Route information
- Maintained by ArDOT
- Existed: c. 1939–present

Section 1
- Length: 1.19 mi (1.92 km)
- South end: US 67 near Gifford
- North end: Wine Dot Road near Gifford

Section 2
- Length: 11.67 mi (18.78 km)
- South end: I-30 / AR 84 near Malvern
- North end: Lake Catherine State Park

Section 3
- Length: 4.91 mi (7.90 km)
- South end: US 270 near Price
- North end: Tigre Mountain Road at the Garland County line

Location
- Country: United States
- State: Arkansas
- Counties: Garland, Hot Spring

Highway system
- Arkansas Highway System; Interstate; US; State; Business; Spurs; Suffixed; Scenic; Heritage
| ← AR 170 | → AR 172 |

Arkansas Highway 171 (AR 171) is a designation for three state highways in Southwest Arkansas. One route of 1.2 miles (1.9 km) runs from U.S. Route 67 (US 67) to Wine Dot Road near an industrial facility. A second route of 12.9 miles (20.8 km) runs from Highway 84 in Malvern to Lake Catherine State Park. A third route of 4.91 miles (7.90 km) begins at US 270 and runs north to the Garland County line, where it continues as Tigre Mountain Road. All routes are maintained by the Arkansas State Highway and Transportation Department (AHTD).

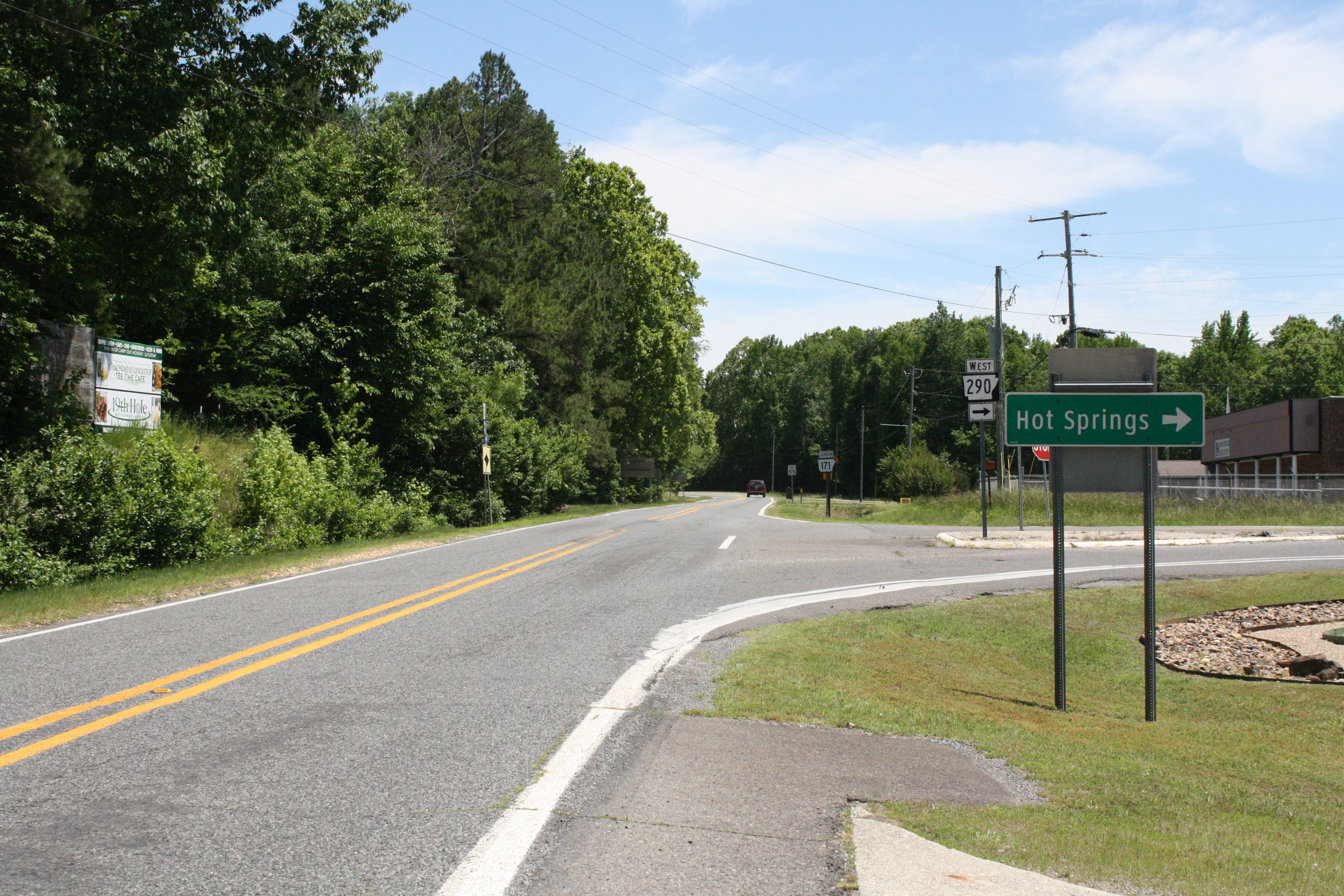
AR 290 begins at AR 171 in Diamondhead

== History ==
The route was first designated on the January 1939 state highway map between Highway 84 in Malvern and Lake Catherine State Park at the county line. It was extended east deeper into the park in 1952. The segment between US 270 and the county line was added in June 1973 pursuant to Act 9 of 1973 by the Arkansas General Assembly. The act directed county judges and legislators to designate up to 12 miles (19 km) of county roads as state highways in each county. The final segment was added for industrial access from US 67 to a new Willamette Industries particleboard plant on March 6, 1986.

== Major intersections ==
| County | Location | mi | km | Destinations | Notes |
|---|---|---|---|---|---|
| Hot Spring | | 0.00 | 0.00 | US 67 – Benton, Malvern | Southern terminus |
| Hot Spring | | 1.19 | 1.92 | Wine Dot Road | Northern terminus |
| Hot Spring | Gap in route | | | | |
| Hot Spring | | 0.00 | 0.00 | I-30 / AR 84 – Bismarck | Southern terminus; exit 97 on I-30 |
| Garland | Diamondhead | 7.70 | 12.39 | AR 290 west – Hot Springs | Eastern terminus of AR 290 |
| Hot Spring | | 11.67 | 18.78 | Lake Catherine State Park | Northern terminus |
Gap in route
| Garland | | 0.00 | 0.00 | US 270 – Hot Springs, Malvern | Southern terminus |
| Hot Spring | | 4.91 | 7.90 | Tigre Mountain Road – Lonsdale | Continuation into Garland County |
1.000 mi = 1.609 km; 1.000 km = 0.621 mi
