= Creaserinus danielae =

Conservation status
- Near Threatened (IUCN 3.1)

- Imperiled (NatureServe)

Scientific classification
- Kingdom: Animalia
- Phylum: Arthropoda
- Class: Malacostraca
- Order: Decapoda
- Suborder: Pleocyemata
- Family: Cambaridae
- Genus: Creaserinus
- Species: C. danielae

Binomial name
- Creaserinus danielae (Hobbs, 1975)

Synonyms
- Fallicambarus danielae

Species of crayfish

Creaserinus danielae, the speckled burrowing crayfish, is a species of crayfish in the family Cambaridae. It is found in Mississippi, Alabama, Louisiana, and Florida.

The IUCN conservation status of Creaserinus danielae is "NT", near threatened. The species may be considered threatened in the near future. The IUCN status was reviewed in 2010.
