= Obovaria haddletoni =

Conservation status
- Critically endangered, possibly extinct (IUCN 3.1)

- Presumed Extinct (NatureServe)

Scientific classification
- Kingdom: Animalia
- Phylum: Mollusca
- Class: Bivalvia
- Order: Unionida
- Family: Unionidae
- Genus: Obovaria
- Species: O. haddletoni

Binomial name
- Obovaria haddletoni (Athearn, 1964)

Species of bivalve

Obovaria haddletoni is a species of freshwater mussel, an aquatic bivalve mollusk in the family Unionidae, the river mussels. This species is endemic to the United States.

This species was formerly in the genus Lampsilis, and was moved to Obovaria in 2008 based on morphological and zoogeographic analysis.
