= Fallicambarus tenuis =

Conservation status
- Data Deficient (IUCN 3.1)

Scientific classification
- Kingdom: Animalia
- Phylum: Arthropoda
- Clade: Pancrustacea
- Class: Malacostraca
- Order: Decapoda
- Suborder: Pleocyemata
- Family: Cambaridae
- Genus: Fallicambarus
- Species: F. tenuis

Binomial name
- Fallicambarus tenuis Hobbs, 1950

Synonyms
- Procambarus tenuis Hobbs, 1950

Species of crayfish

Fallicambarus tenuis is a species of crayfish in the genus Fallicambarus in the family Cambaridae. It was the only species in the subgenus Procambarus (Tenuicambarus) before DNA analysis suggested a reclassification.

Fallicambarus tenuis is rare throughout its range, which is restricted to the Ouachita Mountains of Le Flore County, Oklahoma and Polk County, Arkansas.
