= Fountain Lake School District =

School district in Arkansas, United States

Address
- 4207 Park Avenue Hot Springs, Arkansas, 71901; United States

District information
- Type: Public
- Grades: PreK–12
- NCES District ID: 0506420

Students and staff
- Students: 1,348
- Teachers: 104.65
- Staff: 85.3
- Student–teacher ratio: 12.88
- District mascot: Cobras
- Colors: Purple and Gold

Other information
- Website: www.flcobras.com

Fountain Lake School District 18 (FLSD) is a school district headquartered in unincorporated Garland County, Arkansas, with a Hot Springs postal address but outside of the city limits.

Fountain Lake, portions of Hot Springs Village, and small sections of northern Hot Springs are in the district limits.

The district's boundaries extend into Saline County, where the district serves additional sections of Hot Springs Village.

== Schools ==
- Fountain Lake High School
- Fountain Lake Middle School
- Fountain Lake Elementary School
