= Fallicambarus harpi =

Conservation status
- Near Threatened (IUCN 3.1)

- Imperiled (NatureServe)

Scientific classification
- Kingdom: Animalia
- Phylum: Arthropoda
- Class: Malacostraca
- Order: Decapoda
- Suborder: Pleocyemata
- Family: Cambaridae
- Genus: Fallicambarus
- Species: F. harpi

Binomial name
- Fallicambarus harpi Hobbs & Robison, 1985

Species of crayfish

Fallicambarus harpi, the Ouachita burrowing crayfish, is a species of crayfish in the family Cambaridae. It is known only in southwest Arkansas. The species is a primary burrower, located in low lying seepage areas in pastures, yards and lawns.

The IUCN conservation status of Fallicambarus harpi is "NT", near threatened. The species may be considered threatened in the near future. The IUCN status was reviewed in 2010.
