= Obovaria jacksoniana =

Conservation status
- Vulnerable (IUCN 3.1)

Scientific classification
- Kingdom: Animalia
- Phylum: Mollusca
- Class: Bivalvia
- Order: Unionida
- Family: Unionidae
- Genus: Obovaria
- Species: O. jacksoniana

Binomial name
- Obovaria jacksoniana (Frierson, 1912)

Species of bivalve

Obovaria jacksoniana is a species of freshwater mussel, an aquatic bivalve mollusk in the family Unionidae, the river mussels.

This species is endemic to the United States.
