= Fountain Lake High School =

Fountain Lake Charter High School

Location
- 4207 Park Avenue; Hot Springs, Arkansas 71901; United States
- Coordinates: 34°34′22″N 92°59′19″W

Information
- School type: Public charter high school
- Motto: "Supporting Every Student Every Day for Success"
- School district: Fountain Lake School District
- CEEB code: 041144
- Principal: Frank Janaskie
- Grades: 9–12
- Enrollment: 359 (2023-2024)
- Colors: Purple and gold
- Athletics conference: AAA 4A District 7
- Mascot: Cobra
- Website: www.flcobras.com

Fountain Lake High School is a high school in unincorporated Garland County, Arkansas, with a Hot Springs postal address. It is the only high school in the Fountain Lake School District, which also includes a middle school and elementary school on the same site. It was founded in 1933 with only four students in its graduating class. Since 1975, the mascot has been the cobra.

The district boundary, and by extension the high school boundary, includes Fountain Lake, portions of Hot Springs Village, and small sections of northern Hot Springs. The district's boundaries extend into Saline County, where the district serves additional sections of Hot Springs Village.

== Athletics ==
For 2020-22, the Fountain Lake Cobras participates in the 4A Classification from the 4A Region 7 Conference as administered by the Arkansas Activities Association. The Cobras compete in baseball, basketball (boys/girls), cross country (boys/girls), football, golf (boys/girls), softball, tennis (boys/girls), track & field (boys/girls), and volleyball.
