= Hot Springs Village, Arkansas =

Census-designated place in Arkansas, United States

- CDP
- Village of Hot Springs
- Location in Garland County and Arkansas

- Location in the United States
- Coordinates: 34°39′24″N 92°57′51″W
- Country: United States
- State: Arkansas
- Counties: Garland, Saline
- Founded: June 1, 1970
- Founder: John Cooper, Sr.
- Named for: Hot Springs

Government
  - Type: POA

Area
  - Total: 60.56 sq mi (156.84 km^{2})
  - Land: 57.64 sq mi (149.28 km^{2})
  - Water: 2.92 sq mi (7.56 km^{2})
- Elevation: 646 ft (197 m)

Population (2020)
  - Total: 15,861
  - Density: 275.2/sq mi (106.25/km^{2})
- Time zone: UTC-6 (Central (CST))
  - Summer (DST): UTC-5 (CDT)
- ZIP codes: 71909, 71910
- Area code: 501
- FIPS code: 05-33482
- GNIS feature ID: 2402601
- Website: www.explorethevillage.com

Hot Springs Village is a census-designated place (CDP) in Garland and Saline counties in the U.S. state of Arkansas. As it is situated in two counties, it is also part of two metropolitan statistical areas. The portion in Garland County is within the Hot Springs Metropolitan Statistical Area, while the portion extending into Saline County is part of the Little Rock–North Little Rock–Conway Metropolitan Statistical Area. The population was 15,861 at the 2020 census. It is the largest gated community in the United States.

== Geography ==
According to the United States Census Bureau, the CDP has a total area of 55.7 square miles (144 km^{2}), of which 53.5 square miles (139 km^{2}) is land and 2.2 square miles (5.7 km^{2}) (3.92%) is water.

=== Climate ===
Hot Springs Village ("HSV") has four distinct seasons. Winter freezes usually begin in mid November and may occur into April. Temperatures over 100 degrees may start as early as June and may occur into September. Typically, the area will see several days of snow during the winter and minimum temperatures of 15 degrees or higher. Rainfall is usually plentiful in spring and sparse in summer.

A low-end EF2 tornado struck the town on March 14, 2024. Many homes and trees were damaged.

== Government and politics ==
Hot Springs Village has more than 26,000 acres, much of it wooded. HSV is governed by the HSV Property Owners' Association (POA), a private, tax-exempt property owners association. A general manager and a seven-member volunteer board of directors, who are elected in staggered three-year terms, comprise POA leadership. Day-to-day operation of the POA is handled by an average of 475 employees assigned to one of six departments: Administration, Golf, Planning and Inspection, Public Safety, Public Works, and Recreation.

In addition to the Planning and Inspection Department, HSV's Architectural Control Committee's responsibility is to ensure that all building plans conform to architectural policy and building codes of the Village and to issue permits for new homes, landscaping, and remodeling. The ACC ensures that green belt areas, roadways, lakes, and other common areas are protected for general character, appearance and use by Hot Springs Village property owners.

Hot Springs Village has a Declaration and Covenants and Restrictions with which all property owners must comply. The POA has an information and regulations booklet detailing rules for recreational amenities. All HSV common property and amenities are owned by the property owners as a whole and maintained, regulated and operated by the POA:

- Eleven recreation lakes plus an isolated water-supply lake. The largest, Lake Balboa, is 944 acres.
- Two beaches, two full-service marinas, including boat rentals
- Two lake-side, covered pavilion complexes for group picnics for up to 300 people
- Nine golf courses (some of which are top-rated in Arkansas)
- The only 5-star tennis association in Arkansas (includes 10 clay courts)
- Indoor swimming complex
- Outdoor swimming pool (opened 2020)
- One of the largest bridge clubs in the United States (listed in the "Top 100 " most active duplicate bridge clubs of the ACBL).
- Coronado Fitness Center, a large, extensively equipped fitness center
- More than 30 miles (48 km) of hiking trails
- Coronado Community Center, with more than 18,000 square feet (1,700 m^{2}) of meeting rooms, including a 3,600-square-foot (330 m^{2}) library with over 15,000 catalogued items (plus paperbacks),
- Ponce de Leon Community Center, with more than 11,000 square feet (1,000 m^{2}), plus the 650-seat Woodlands Auditorium for the performing arts. The center's Casa de Carta is home to one of the largest Duplicate Bridge clubs in the U.S., with more than 800 members. Ponce de Leon's Ouachita Activities Building has large and small meeting rooms.
- DeSoto Club Events Center, available for rent by POA members and non-members
- An RV camping park and RV and boat storage areas
- A family recreation area, including miniature golf and indoor/outdoor activities
- Lawn bowling, bocce ball and pickleball courts
- A public-safety department providing police and fire protection
- Four fire stations and an ambulance headquarters
- Animal/wildlife control

=== Law enforcement and crime ===
According to neighborhoodscout.com, the CDP has a crime rate of 4 crimes per square mile, significantly lower than the Arkansas average of 21 crimes per square mile. The organization had also determined that the risk of becoming a victim in Hot Springs Village was 1 in 81 compared to the state average of 1 in 28.

== Demographics ==
Historical population
Census	Pop.	Note	%±
1980	2,083		—
1990	6,361		205.4%
2000	8,397		32.0%
2010	12,807		52.5%
2020	15,861		23.8%
U.S. Decennial Census

=== 2020 census ===
As of the 2020 census, Hot Springs Village had a population of 15,861. The median age was 68.9 years. 7.6% of residents were under the age of 18 and 60.6% of residents were 65 years of age or older. For every 100 females, there were 89.1 males, and for every 100 females age 18 and over, there were 87.9 males age 18 and over.

80.2% of residents lived in urban areas, while 19.8% lived in rural areas.

There were 8,170 households in Hot Springs Village, including 5,045 families residing in the CDP, and 8.9% had children under the age of 18 living in them. Of all households, 61.2% were married-couple households, 11.4% were households with a male householder and no spouse or partner present, and 23.6% were households with a female householder and no spouse or partner present. About 27.7% of all households were made up of individuals and 20.7% had someone living alone who was 65 years of age or older.

There were 9,401 housing units, of which 13.1% were vacant. The homeowner vacancy rate was 2.3% and the rental vacancy rate was 14.4%.

Hot Springs Village racial composition
Race	Number	Percentage
White (non-Hispanic)	14,482	91.31%
Black or African American (non-Hispanic)	233	1.47%
Native American	52	0.33%
Asian	83	0.52%
Pacific Islander	10	0.06%
Other/Mixed	575	3.63%
Hispanic or Latino	426	2.69%

=== 2010 census ===
As of the census of 2010, the CDP's racial demographics were 97.9% white (96.0 non-Hispanic, 1.1% White Hispanic), 1.3% Black or African-American, 0.8% American Indian and Alaska Native, 0.4% Asian, 0.0% Native Hawaiian and Other Pacific Islander, and 0.5 belonging to other races. 1.5 of the CDP's residents were Hispanic of any race.

=== 2000 census ===
As of the census of 2000, there were 8,397 people, 4,295 households, and 3,221 families residing in the CDP. The population density was 221.4 inhabitants per square mile (85.5/km^{2}). There were 5,121 housing units at an average density of 135.0 per square mile (52.1/km^{2}). The racial makeup of the CDP was 97.98% White, 0.94% Black or African American, 0.14% Native American, 0.19% Asian, 0.20% from other races, and 0.55% from two or more races. 1.01% of the population were Hispanic or Latino of any race.

There were 4,295 households, out of which 6.8% had children under the age of 18 living with them, 71.5% were married couples living together, 2.8% had a female householder with no husband present, and 25.0% were non-families. 23.1% of all households were made up of individuals, and 18.4% had someone living alone who was 65 years of age or older. The average household size was 1.94 and the average family size was 2.22. In the CDP, the population was spread out, with 6.6% under the age of 18, 1.7% from 18 to 24, 8.0% from 25 to 44, 27.2% from 45 to 64, and 56.6% who were 65 years of age or older. The median age was 67 years. For every 100 females, there were 88.5 males. For every 100 females age 18 and over, there were 87.6 males.

The median income for a household in the CDP was $41,875, and the median income for a family was $48,958. Males had a median income of $35,236 versus $20,313 for females. The per capita income for the CDP was $24,492. About 1.6% of families and 2.5% of the population were below the poverty line, including 5.6% of those under age 18 and 1.9% of those age 65 or over.

== Education ==
Hot Springs Village is located in Fountain Lake and Jessieville school districts. Fountain Lake School District operates Fountain Lake High School.

== Culture and society ==
The private-membership Diamante Country Club has a golf course and clubhouse. Country club members bought the club from the previous owners, ClubCorp and Cooper Communities Inc., early in 2018. A weekly local newspaper, the Hot Springs Village Voice, is delivered every Tuesday.
