= DeGray Lake Resort State Park =

State park in Arkansas, United States

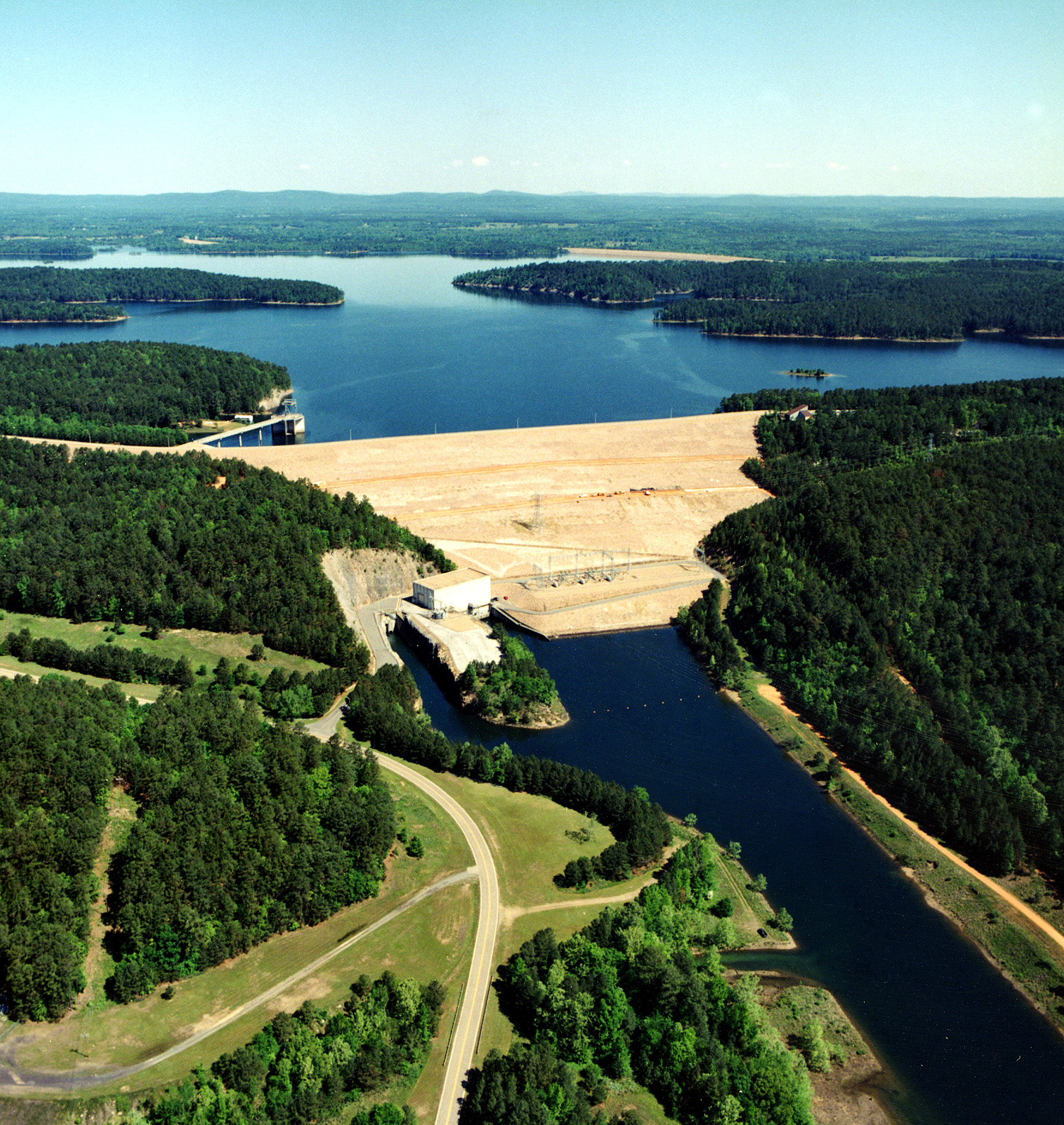
- DeGray Lake and Dam

- Location within Arkansas Location within the United States
- Interactive map of DeGray Lake Resort State Park
- Location: Clark and Hot Spring counties, Arkansas, United States
- Coordinates: 34°14′45″N 93°08′52″W
- Area: 938 acres (380 ha)
- Established: 1974
- Administrator: Arkansas Department of Parks, Heritage and Tourism
- Website: Official website
- Arkansas State Parks

DeGray Lake Resort State Park is a 984-acre (398 ha) Arkansas state park in Clark and Hot Spring counties, Arkansas in the United States. Situated in the Ouachita Mountains, the park features the 13,800-acre (5,600 ha) DeGray Lake, the park features a championship rated 18 hole golf course and Arkansas's only state park resort. The United States Army Corps of Engineers began constructing DeGray Dam on the Caddo River in 1963, and support for a state park began growing shortly after. The park was created in 1974, and the resort and golf course were added by 1975.

== Recreation ==
DeGray Lake Resort State Park offers many different opportunities for outdoors enthusiasts such as fishing, swimming, water skiing, biking, hiking, horseback riding, and boating. Basketball courts and tennis courts are also available. For campers, there are 113 class A sites in addition to RV sites.

=== Resort and golf course ===
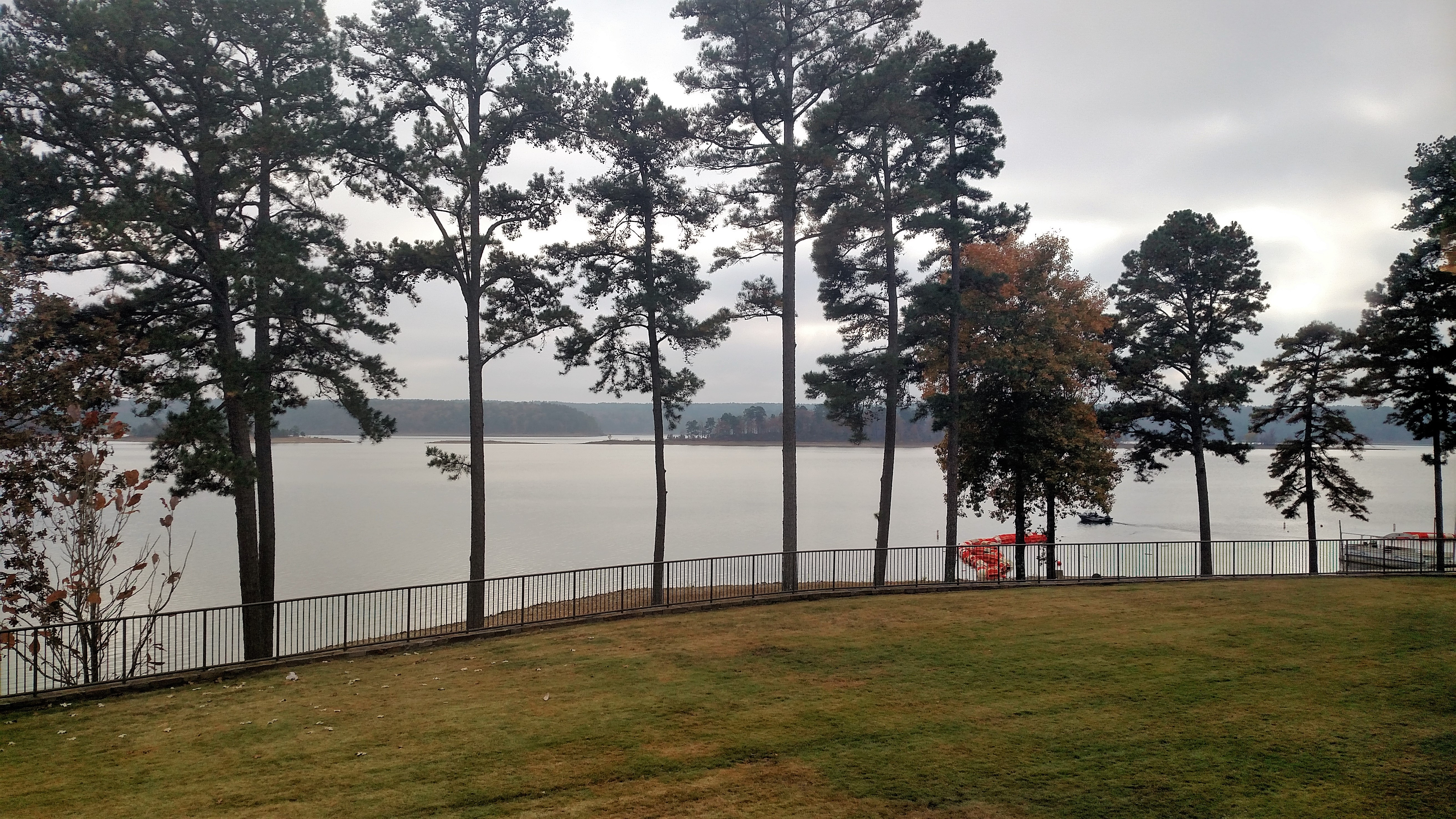
Lake view from the resort

The 94-room DeGray Lodge and Convention center is available for family reunions, retreats, board meeting, conventions. The Shoreline Restaurant and DeGray Day Spa are located at the lodge.

DeGray's 18-hole championship-rated public course stretches 7,100 yards (6,500 m). The front nine offers wide, expansive fairways with elevated, undulating and sloping greens, tee boxes and hidden water hazards. The back nine are carved out of the woodlands leaving little room for stray shots. The course offers a driving range, practice green, chipping area and lessons, from the blue tees the course is 7,100 yards (6,500 m), from the white-6,560 yards (6,000 m), gold-6,200 yards (5,700 m) and red-5,800 yards (5,300 m). The course rating is 72.7 and the slope is 134. Water comes into play on seven holes. The Pro Shop offers a snack bar, cart and club rentals, as well as golf equipment.
