= Ouachita, Arkansas =

Ouachita
- Unincorporated community
- Location within Arkansas Location within the United States
- Coordinates: 33°51′08″N 92°49′46″W
- Country: United States
- State: Arkansas
- County: Dallas
- Elevation: 154 ft (47 m)
- Time zone: UTC-6 (Central (CST))
  - Summer (DST): UTC-5 (CDT)
- Area code: 870
- GNIS feature ID: 77932

Ouachita (also Washita) is an unincorporated community in Dallas County, Arkansas, United States.
