= Joseph F. Fitzpatrick Jr. =

American carcinologist

Joseph F. Fitzpatrick Jr. (08 March 1932 – 11 July 2002 in Mobile, Alabama) was an American carcinologist. He primarily studied crustaceans, in particular crayfish of which he described many new species.

== Career ==
Fitzpatrick was born and grew up in New Orleans. In 1959, he graduated to B.S. and in 1961 to M.S. in zoology at the Tulane University. In 1964, he promoted to Ph.D. in biology at the University of Virginia. Subsequently, he became an assistant professor at the Mississippi State University and at the Randolph-Macon Woman’s College. Afterwards he moved to Mobile, Alabama where he taught as professor at the University of South Alabama for twenty-five years until his retirement in 1998. In 1972, he was co-founder (with James Avault) of the International Association of Astacology in Hinterthal, Austria, an organisation which is devoted to the research of crayfish. He was further fellow of the American Association for the Advancement of Science, and a member of Sigma Xi. Fitzpatrick's main research field was the ecology and systematics of the crayfish in which he was recognized as one of the leading experts.
