= Mauck =

Mauck, an Americanized form of German Mauch or a German variant of Mauk, may refer to:

== People ==
- Carl Mauck (born 1947), former American football player
- Hal Mauck (1869–1921), Major League Baseball pitcher
- Matt Mauck (born 1979), former American football player

== Places ==
- Mauck, Virginia, an unincorporated community in Page County
