= Malvern High School (Arkansas) =

Location
- 501 E Highland Ave; Malvern, Hot Spring County, Arkansas 72104; United States; 34°21′20″N 92°48′14″W

Information
- School type: Public, comprehensive high school
- Motto: "It's here for the taking."
- School district: Malvern School District
- Superintendent: Brian Golden
- CEEB code: 041527
- Principal: Jennifer Shnaekel
- Teaching staff: 74.74 (FTE))
- Grades: 9–12
- Enrollment: 575 (2023-2024)
- Student to teacher ratio: 7.69
- Education system: ADE Smart Core
- Classes offered: Regular (Core), Career Focus, Advanced Placement (AP)
- Hours in school day: 8:00 - 3:30
- Colors: Orange and black
- Slogan: "Passion. Pride. Excellence."
- Fight song: "On Wisconsin!"
- Athletics conference: 4A Region 7
- Sports: Football, Volleyball, Basketball, Baseball, Softball, Golf, Tennis, Track, Soccer
- Mascot: Leopard
- Team name: Leopards
- Rivals: Arkadelphia, Nashville, Glen Rose
- Accreditation: ADE
- Yearbook: The Mirror
- Communities served: Malvern, Midway, Donaldson, Leola, Rockport, Perla, Carthage
- Feeder schools: Malvern Middle School
- Affiliation: Arkansas Activities Association
- Website: mhs.malvernleopards.org
- Last updated: February 26, 2019 (7 years ago)

Malvern High School is a comprehensive public high school located in Malvern, Arkansas. It is the largest of five public high schools in Hot Spring County and the only high school administered by the Malvern School District.

Its attendance boundary includes Malvern, Perla, Carthage, almost all of Rockport, and a section of Midway.

Malvern has won multiple state titles in academic Quiz Bowl competitions and offers nine sports that have won seven state championships.

== Academics ==
The assumed course of study is the Smart Core curriculum developed by the Arkansas Department of Education. Students may engage in regular and Advanced Placement (AP) coursework and exams prior to graduation. Malvern High School is accredited by ADE.

Students who meet minimum college entrance requirements are allowed the opportunity to take up to 13 hours of college coursework through a partnership with local community college, College of the Ouachitas, at no charge to students.

== Athletics ==
The Malvern High School mascot and athletic emblem is the Leopard with orange and black serving as the school colors.

The Malvern Leopards compete in interscholastic activities within the 4A Classification administered by the Arkansas Activities Association. The Leopards play within the 4A Region 7 Conference. The Leopards participate in football, volleyball, basketball, baseball, softball, golf, tennis, track, and soccer.

- Basketball: The Leopards basketball team won consecutive state basketball championships in 1989 and 1990. The Lady Leopards captured their first state basketball title in 2013 and their second in 2014.
- Baseball: The Malvern baseball squads have 26 state tournament appearances, and nine semifinal appearances.
- Football: The Malvern football team won the Class AAA State Championship in 1993 and the Class 4A State Championship in 2022.
- Track and field: The girls track teams won consecutive state track and field championships in 1983 and 1984.

== Notable people ==
- Frank Bonner, actor (best known as Herb Tarlek on WKRP in Cincinnati) and director
- Isaac Davis, American football coach and former NFL player
- Madre Hill, former NFL player and collegiate star for University of Arkansas
- Tony Ollison, Arena football player
- William N. Small, United States Navy Admiral
- Billy Bob Thornton, actor, screenwriter, director, and musician
- Keith Traylor, retired NFL player
