= List of places in Arkansas: F =

Arkansas State Seal

This list of current cities, towns, unincorporated communities, and other recognized places in the U.S. state of Arkansas whose name begins with the letter F. It also includes information on the number and names of counties in which the place lies, and its lower and upper zip code bounds, if applicable.

== Cities and Towns ==
Name of place	Number of counties	Principal county	Lower zip code	Upper zip code
Faber	1	Hot Spring County		
Fairbanks	1	Van Buren County	72131	
Fair Field	1	Cross County		
Fairfield	1	Jefferson County		
Fairfield	1	Pulaski County	72209	
Fairfield Bay	2	Cleburne County	72088	
Fairfield Bay	2	Van Buren County	72088	
Fairindale	1	Dallas County	71725	
Fairman	1	Pulaski County		
Fairmount	1	Prairie County		
Fair Oaks	1	Cross County	72101	
Fairview	1	Chicot County	71653	
Fairview	1	Dallas County	71763	
Fairview	1	Fulton County		
Fairview	1	Lonoke County	72086	
Fairview	1	Marion County	72634	
Fairview	1	Ouachita County	71701	
Fairview	1	Pulaski County		
Fairview	1	Searcy County	72643	
Fairview	1	Sevier County	71841	
Faith	1	Jefferson County		
Falcon	1	Nevada County	71827	
Falls Chapel	1	Sevier County	71846	
Fallsville	1	Newton County	72854	
Fancy Hill	1	Montgomery County	71935	
Fannie	1	Montgomery County		
Farelly Lake	1	Jefferson County	72160	
Farewell	1	Carroll County		
Fargo	1	Monroe County	72021	
Farindale	1	Dallas County		
Farmington	1	Washington County	72730	
Farmville	1	Bradley County	71671	
Farris Springs	1	Johnson County		
Farville	1	Craighead County		
Faulknerville	1	Greene County	72412	
Fayette Junction	1	Washington County		
Fayetteville	1	Washington County	72701	72705
Feenyville	1	Lincoln County		
Felco	1	Crittenden County		
Felsenthal	1	Union County	71747	
Felton	1	Lee County	72360	
Fender	1	Randolph County	72476	
Fendley	1	Clark County	71921	
Fenn	1	Sebastian County		
Fenter	1	Grant County	72167	
Ferda	1	Jefferson County	72046	
Ferguson	1	Phillips County	72328	
Ferguson Crossroads	1	Miller County	71837	
Fern	1	Franklin County	72946	
Ferndale	1	Pulaski County	72208	
Fiftysix	1	Stone County	72560	
Fifty-Six	1	Stone County	72533	
Figure Five	1	Crawford County	72956	
Finch	1	Greene County	72450	
Fisher	1	Craighead County	72421	
Fisher	1	Poinsett County	72429	
Fitzgerald	1	Jackson County	72112	
Fitzgerald Crossing	1	Cross County		
Fitzhugh	1	Woodruff County	72006	
Fivemile	1	Cleburne County	72530	
Flag	1	Stone County	72645	
Flat	1	Newton County		
Flat Rock	1	Johnson County	72847	
Flatwoods	1	Newton County		
Flint Creek	1	Benton County		
Flippin	1	Marion County	72634	
Floodway	1	Mississippi County	72442	
Floral	1	Independence County	72534	
Florence	1	Drew County	71655	
Floss	1	Washington County		
Floyd	1	White County	72143	
Fogel	1	Polk County		
Fomby	1	Little River County	71822	
Fontaine	1	Greene County	72450	
Fordyce	1	Dallas County	71742	
Foreman	1	Little River County	71836	
Forest Grove	1	Columbia County	71861	
Forest Grove	1	Lafayette County	71861	
Forest Park	1	Pulaski County	72207	
Formosa	1	Van Buren County	72031	
Forrest Bonner	1	Dallas County		
Forrest City	1	St. Francis County	72335	
Fort Chaffee	2	Franklin County	72905	
Fort Chaffee	2	Sebastian County	72905	
Fort Douglas	1	Johnson County	72854	
Fort Lynn	1	Miller County	71837	
Fort Smith	1	Sebastian County	72901	72917
Fort Smith Municipal Airport	1	Sebastian County	72903	
Fort Smith National Historic Site	1	Sebastian County	72902	
Forty Four	1	Izard County	72519	
Forum	1	Madison County	72740	
Foster Hill	1	Union County		
Fouke	1	Miller County	71837	
Fountain Hill	1	Ashley County	71642	
Fountain Lake	1	Garland County	71913	
Fountain Prairie	1	Ashley County	71646	
Fourche	1	Perry County	72016	
Fourche Junction	1	Perry County		
Four Forks	1	Lee County	72360	
Four Gums	1	St. Francis County		
Four Mile Corner	1	Prairie County	72040	
Fourmile Hill	1	White County	72143	
Fowler	1	Yell County	72834	
Fox	1	Stone County	72051	
Fox Hill	1	Sebastian County	72940	
Francis	1	Boone County	72601	
Francway	1	Saline County		
Franklin	1	Izard County	72536	
Freck	1	Marion County		
Fredonia	1	Prairie County	72017	
Free Hope	1	Columbia County	71753	
French	1	Fulton County		
Frenchmans Bayou	1	Mississippi County	72338	
Frenchport	1	Ouachita County		
Fresno	1	Lincoln County		
Friendship	1	Cleveland County		
Friendship	1	Columbia County	71860	
Friendship	1	Conway County		
Friendship	1	Hot Spring County	71942	
Friley	1	Johnson County	72752	
Frisco	1	Benton County		
Frisco Junction	1	Mississippi County	72438	
Fritz	1	Greene County		
Frog Town	1	Sebastian County	72938	
Fryatt	1	Fulton County		
Frys Mill	1	Poinsett County	72365	
Fullerton	1	Bradley County		
Fulton	1	Hempstead County	71838	
Funston	1	Faulkner County		
Furlow	1	Lonoke County	72086	
Furry	1	Crawford County		

== Townships ==
Name of place	Number of counties	Principal county	Lower zip code	Upper zip code
Fair Oaks Township	1	Cross County		
Fairplay Township	1	Saline County		
Fairview Township	1	Independence County		
Fannie Township	1	Montgomery County		
Farmington Township	1	Washington County		
Farris Township	1	Stone County		
Faulkner Township	1	Polk County		
Fayette Township	1	Calhoun County		
Fayetteville Township	1	Washington County		
Felker Township	1	Benton County		
Fenter Township	1	Grant County		
Fenter Township	1	Hot Spring County		
Ferguson Township	1	Yell County		
Flag Township	1	Stone County		
Flat Creek Township	1	Lawrence County		
Fleener Township	1	Lee County		
Fletcher Township	1	Lonoke County		
Fletcher Township	1	Mississippi County		
Flint Township	1	Benton County		
Fogleman Township	1	Crittenden County		
Fordyce Township	1	Dallas County		
Formosa Township	1	Van Buren County		
Foster Township	1	Randolph County		
Fourche Lafave Township	1	Perry County		
Francis Township	1	Cleburne County		
Francure Township	1	White County		
Franklin Township	1	Calhoun County		
Franklin Township	1	Carroll County		
Franklin Township	1	Desha County		
Franklin Township	1	Drew County		
Franklin Township	1	Grant County		
Franklin Township	1	Howard County		
Franklin Township	1	Izard County		
Franklin Township	1	Little River County		
Franklin Township	1	Marion County		
Franklin Township	1	Stone County		
Franklin Township	1	Union County		
Franks Township	1	St. Francis County		
Franks Township	1	Woodruff County		
Freedom Township	1	Polk County		
Freeman Township	1	Pope County		
Freeman Township	1	Woodruff County		
Freeo Township	1	Ouachita County		
French Township	1	Lafayette County		
Friendship Township	1	Greene County		
Fulton Township	1	Fulton County		
Fulton Township	1	Polk County		
Furlow Township	1	Lonoke County		
