= Loy Mauch =

American politician

Arkansas State Representative for District 26 (Hot Spring and Garland counties)
- In office January 10, 2011 – January 10, 2013
- Preceded by: Mike Burris
- Succeeded by: David Kizzia

Personal details
- Born: David Loy Mauch; April 7, 1952 (age 74) Arkansas, U.S.
- Party: Republican
- Spouse(s): Lisa, Cassie Hardy, Brenda Hosey

David Loy Mauch (born April 7, 1952) is a Republican former member of the Arkansas House of Representatives for District 26, based primarily in Hot Spring County in central Arkansas. At the time of his election in 2010, he was a resident of Bismarck. Mauch is a former bull rider and cable splicer for Southwestern Bell and AT&T.

Mauch was elected in the 2010 Arkansas elections, having received 53.5 percent of the 7,531 ballots cast. He succeeded Democrat Mike Burris, who did not run again due to term limits. Mauch was defeated by Democrat David Kizzia in the November 6, 2012 general election.

On January 28, 2014, Mauch testified at a hearing at a committee meeting regarding a law that would separate the joint holiday honoring civil rights activist Martin Luther King Jr. and Confederate general Robert E. Lee. Mauch spoke in support of Lee, saying Lee had "committed no crimes, broke no laws, and violated no part of the Constitution...the historically uneducated continue to denigrate him with their false accusations." The law did not pass.

== Political views ==
Mauch, a neo-Confederate, is a member of the League of the South and was a unit commander for the Sons of Confederate Veterans until 2009.

Mauch believes, among other things, that Abraham Lincoln should not be honored in Arkansas and that the Confederate flag is a symbol of Jesus Christ and biblical government. Mauch was a supporter of the Tea Party movement. Mauch is a prolific writer of letters to the editor to the Arkansas Democrat-Gazette. In these letters he compared Abraham Lincoln and Northern generals to Nazis, war criminals and communists and wrote that slavery couldn't have been that bad because "Jesus and Paul never condemned it".
