= Glen Rose High School =

Glen Rose High School may refer to the following schools:

- Glen Rose High School (Arkansas)
- Glen Rose High School (Texas)

== See also ==
- Glen Rose School District, Arkansas
- Glen Rose Independent School District, Texas
