= Bismarck High School (Arkansas) =

Location
- 11636 Hwy 84; Bismarck, Arkansas 71929; United States; 34°18′56″N 93°10′40″W

Information
- School type: Public comprehensive
- Status: Open
- School district: Bismarck School District
- CEEB code: 041210
- NCES School ID: 050324000086
- Teaching staff: 42.76 (on FTE basis)
- Grades: 9–12
- Enrollment: 360 (2023-2024)
- Student to teacher ratio
- Education system: ADE Smart Core
- Classes offered: Regular, Advanced Placement (AP)
- Colors: Blue and silver
- Athletics: Football, Golf, Cross Country, Basketball, Baseball, Softball, Track, Tennis
- Athletics conference: 4A Region 2
- Mascot: Lion
- Team name: Bismarck Lions
- Accreditation: ADE
- Website: bhs.bismarcklions.net

Bismarck High School is a nationally recognized and accredited public high school located in the rural community of Bismarck, Arkansas, United States. The school provides comprehensive secondary education for approximately 1100 students each year in grades 9 through 12. It is one of four public high schools in Hot Spring County, Arkansas and the only high school administered by the Bismarck School District.

== Academics ==
Bismarck High School is accredited by the Arkansas Department of Education (ADE). The assumed course of study follows the Smart Core curriculum developed by the ADE. Students complete regular (core and elective) and career focus coursework and exams and may take Advanced Placement (AP) courses and exams with the opportunity to receive college credit. Bismarck High School maintains a partnership with the College of the Ouachitas (COTO) to allow qualified students to take up to 12 college credits.

== Athletics ==
The Bismarck High School mascot and athletic emblem is the Lion with blue and silver serving as the school colors.

The Bismarck Lions compete in interscholastic activities within the 3A Classification via the 4A Region 2 Conference as administered by the Arkansas Activities Association. The Lions participate in football, golf (boys/girls), tennis (boys/girls), cross country (boys/girls), basketball (boys/girls), cheerleading, baseball, softball, and track and field (boys/girls).

The Lions have won seven state championships in its history, including:

- Golf: The boys golf teams have won one state championship (1999).

The girls golf team has won (5) state championships. (2016,18,19,20,21)

- Tennis: The girls tennis teams have won one state championship (2007).

== Notable alumni ==
- Reggie Ritter - MLB Player
