= MSSD =

MSSD may refer to:

- Model Secondary School for the Deaf
- Malvern Special School District
