= GRHS =

GRHS may refer to:

== Schools ==
- George Ranch High School, Fort Bend County, Texas, United States
- Glen Ridge High School, Glen Ridge, New Jersey, United States
- Glen Rock High School, Glen Rock, New Jersey, United States
- Glen Rose High School (Arkansas), Malvern, Arkansas, United States
- Glen Rose High School (Texas), Glen Rose, Texas, United States
- Grand Rapids High School, Grand Rapids, Minnesota, United States
