= Mauch =

Mauch is a German surname. Notable people with the surname include:

- Billy and Bobby Mauch, (1921–2006 and 1921–2007), American child actors
- Christof Mauch (born 1960), German historian
- Cody Mauch (born 1999), American football player
- Corine Mauch (born 1960), Swiss politician
- Daniel Mauch (c. 1477–1540), German sculptor
- Fritz C. Mauch (1905-1940), German film editor
- Gene Mauch (1925–2005), American baseball player and manager
- Hans Mauch (1906–1984), German aerospace engineer
- Hans-Rudi Mauch (1919–1979), of the figure-skating duo Frick and Frack
- Karl Mauch (1837–1875), German explorer and geographer
- Loy Mauch, (born 1952), American politician
- Margaret Evelyn Mauch (1897–1987), American mathematician and professor
- Monika Mauch, German opera singer
- Paul Mauch (1897–1924), German footballer
- Richard Mauch (1874–1921), Austrian painter and illustrator
- Thomas Mauch (born 1937), German cinematographer and film producer
