= Midway, Hot Spring County, Arkansas =

- Town
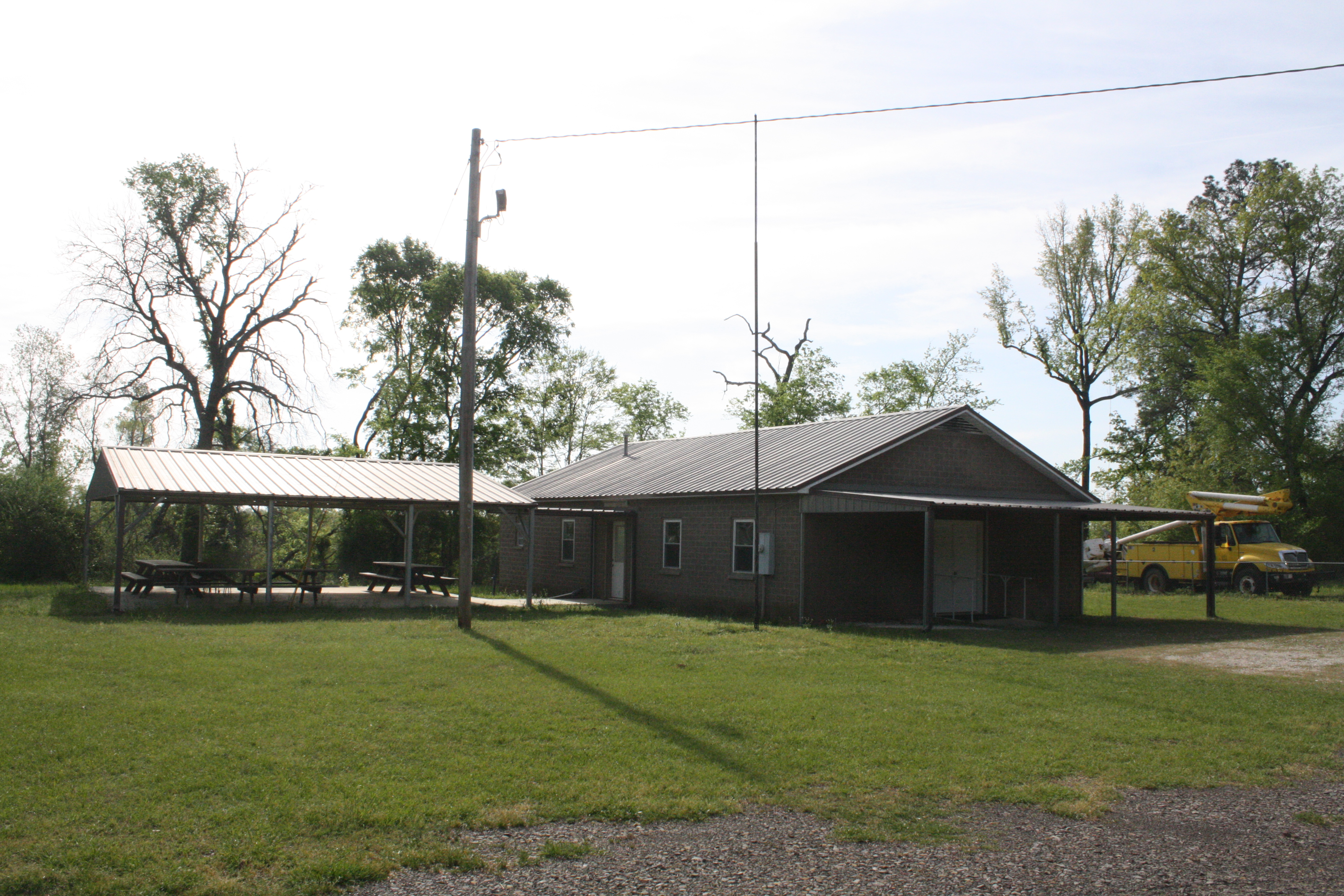
- City Hall

- Location of Midway in Hot Spring County, Arkansas.

- Location within Arkansas Location within the United States
- Coordinates: 34°15′10″N 92°58′08″W
- Country: United States
- State: Arkansas
- County: Hot Spring

Area
  - Total: 3.54 sq mi (9.16 km^{2})
  - Land: 3.52 sq mi (9.12 km^{2})
  - Water: 0.015 sq mi (0.04 km^{2})
- Elevation: 269 ft (82 m)

Population (2020)
  - Total: 377
  - Estimate (2025): 375 ▼
  - Density: 107.1/sq mi (41.34/km^{2})
- Time zone: UTC-6 (Central (CST))
  - Summer (DST): UTC-5 (CDT)
- Area code: 501
- GNIS feature ID: 2406162
- FIPS code: 05-45560

Midway is a town in Hot Spring County, Arkansas, United States. Midway was incorporated on May 3, 2000, and had a population of 377 at the 2020 census.

== Geography ==
Midway is located in south-central Hot Spring County, between the Ouachita River and Interstate 30 and between the towns of Donaldson to the east and Friendship to the west. The closest access points to I-30 are Exit 83 at Friendship, 2.5 miles (4.0 km) west of the southern end of Midway, and Exit 91 at Social Hill, 4 miles (6 km) north of the northern end of town via Midway Road. U.S. Route 67 passes through the southern part of Midway and crosses the Ouachita River at the southeastern border of town.

According to the U.S. Census Bureau, the town of Midway has a total area of 3.6 square miles (9.2 km^{2}), of which 0.01 square miles (0.03 km^{2}), or 0.32%, are water.

== Demographics ==
Historical population
Census	Pop.	Note	%±
2010	389		—
2020	377		−3.1%
2025 (est.)	375	▼	−0.5%
U.S. Decennial Census

=== 2020 census ===
Midway town, Arkansas – Racial and ethnic composition Note: the US Census treats Hispanic/Latino as an ethnic category. This table excludes Latinos from the racial categories and assigns them to a separate category. Hispanics/Latinos may be of any race.
Race / Ethnicity (NH = Non-Hispanic)	Pop 2010	Pop 2020	% 2010	% 2020
White alone (NH)	381	352	97.94%	93.37%
Black or African American alone (NH)	0	1	0.00%	0.27%
Native American or Alaska Native alone (NH)	1	4	0.26%	1.06%
Asian alone (NH)	3	0	0.77%	0.00%
Pacific Islander alone (NH)	0	0	0.00%	0.00%
Some Other Race alone (NH)	0	0	0.00%	0.00%
Mixed Race or Multi-Racial (NH)	1	18	0.26%	4.77%
Hispanic or Latino (any race)	3	2	0.77%	0.53%
Total	389	377	100.00%	100.00%

== Education ==
It is divided between the Ouachita School District and the Malvern School District. Ouachita High School is the zoned comprehensive high school of the former and Malvern High School is such of the latter.

The Ouachita School District headquarters, Ouachita Elementary School, and Ouachita High School are in the Midway town limits, and the facilities have Donaldson, AR postal addresses.
