= Glen Rose (disambiguation) =

Glen Rose (1905–1994) was an American college football and college basketball coach.

Glen Rose may also refer to:

== Places ==
- Glen Rose, Arkansas
- Glen Rose, Texas

== Geology ==
- Glen Rose Formation, geologic unit in Texas

== See also ==
- Glenrose, Washington
