= Jones Mill, Arkansas =

- Census-designated place
- Location within Arkansas Location within the United States
- Coordinates: 34°26′15″N 92°53′16″W
- Country: United States
- State: Arkansas
- County: Hot Spring
- Elevation: 312 ft (95 m)

Population (2020)
  - Total: 411
- Time zone: UTC-6 (Central (CST))
  - Summer (DST): UTC-5 (CDT)
- ZIP code: 72105
- Area code: 501
- GNIS feature ID: 57997

Jones Mill (also known as Jones Mills) is an unincorporated community and census-designated place (CDP) in Hot Spring County, Arkansas, United States. It was first listed as a CDP in the 2020 census with a population of 411.

Jones Mill is located along U.S. Route 270 7 miles (11 km) northwest of Malvern. Jones Mill has a post office with ZIP code 72105.

== History ==
Jones Mill formerly had three major Reynolds Metals Company plants: The Jones Mills Reduction Plant, the Malvern Cable Plant and the Hot Spring Rolling Mill. The United States War Department in October 1941 announced the Remmel Dam Aluminum Plant would be one of four defense plants built in Arkansas. Reynolds Metals bought the plant after the war.

In September 1985, Reynolds Metals announced it would close its Jones Mills plant and the Patterson Reduction Plant, at Gum Springs, Arkansas, by mid-October.

After the permanent closures, Reynolds Metals reported it was then operating at 72 percent of its revised reduction capacity.

The cable plant was later sold and currently is owned by General Cable Corporation. Hot Spring Rolling Mill is now operated by Reynolds Packaging Group, a unit of Reynolds Group Holdings. The U.S. War Department's reduction plant was named for nearby Remmel Dam, a hydroelectric dam operated by Arkansas Power & Light Co. (now known as Entergy Arkansas.) Reynolds Metals renamed it, using the older spelling of the community's name, Jones Mills. The cable mill was named for the nearby city of Malvern. The rolling mill is named for Hot Spring County.

== Demographics ==
Historical population
Census	Pop.	Note	%±
2020	411		—
U.S. Decennial Census; 2020

=== 2020 census ===
Jones Mills CDP, Arkansas – Racial and ethnic composition Note: the US Census treats Hispanic/Latino as an ethnic category. This table excludes Latinos from the racial categories and assigns them to a separate category. Hispanics/Latinos may be of any race.
Race / Ethnicity (NH = Non-Hispanic)	Pop 2020	% 2020
White alone (NH)	361	87.83%
Black or African American alone (NH)	5	1.22%
Native American or Alaska Native alone (NH)	1	0.24%
Asian alone (NH)	0	0.00%
Pacific Islander alone (NH)	0	0.00%
Some Other Race alone (NH)	0	0.00%
Mixed Race or Multi-Racial (NH)	33	8.03%
Hispanic or Latino (any race)	11	2.68%
Total	411	100.00%

== Education ==
Public education for early childhood, elementary and secondary school students is provided by Magnet Cove School District, which leads to graduation from Magnet Cove High School.

== Infrastructure ==
=== Transportation ===
Jones Mill is connected on road by U.S. Route 270 and Arkansas Highway 51. Arkansas Midland Railroad, operating over the route of the original Hot Springs Railroad, provides railroad freight service to Hot Springs and Malvern, and links to the Union Pacific Railroad in Malvern.
