= Traskwood, Arkansas =

- City
- Location of Traskwood in Saline County, Arkansas.
- Coordinates: 34°27′12″N 92°39′51″W
- Country: United States
- State: Arkansas
- County: Saline

Area
  - Total: 5.64 sq mi (14.60 km^{2})
  - Land: 5.63 sq mi (14.58 km^{2})
  - Water: 0.0077 sq mi (0.02 km^{2})
- Elevation: 305 ft (93 m)

Population (2020)
  - Total: 495
  - Estimate (2025): 528 ▲
  - Density: 87.9/sq mi (33.95/km^{2})
- Time zone: UTC-6 (Central (CST))
  - Summer (DST): UTC-5 (CDT)
- ZIP code: 72167
- Area code: 501
- FIPS code: 05-69830
- GNIS feature ID: 2405598

Traskwood is a city in Saline County, Arkansas, United States. As of the 2020 census, Traskwood had a population of 495. It is part of the Little Rock–North Little Rock–Conway Metropolitan Statistical Area.

== Geography ==
According to the United States Census Bureau, the town has a total area of 14.7 km^{2} (5.7 mi^{2}), of which 14.6 km^{2} (5.7 mi^{2}) is land and 0.18% is water.

== Demographics ==
Historical population
Census	Pop.	Note	%±
1910	228		—
1920	256		12.3%
1930	225		−12.1%
1940	226		0.4%
1950	199		−11.9%
1960	205		3.0%
1970	358		74.6%
1980	459		28.2%
1990	488		6.3%
2000	548		12.3%
2010	518		−5.5%
2020	495		−4.4%
2025 (est.)	528	▲	6.7%
U.S. Decennial Census

=== 2020 census ===
Traskwood racial composition
Race	Number	Percentage
White (non-Hispanic)	466	94.14%
Native American	1	0.2%
Other/Mixed	24	4.85%
Hispanic or Latino	4	0.81%

As of the 2020 United States census, there were 495 people, 147 households, and 94 families residing in the city.

=== 2000 census ===
As of the census of 2000, there were 548 people, 203 households, and 149 families residing in the town. The population density was 37.4/km^{2} (97.1/mi^{2}). There were 211 housing units at an average density of 14.4/km^{2} (37.4/mi^{2}). The racial makeup of the town was 97.26% White, 0.73% Black or African American, 0.18% Native American, 0.73% from other races, and 1.09% from two or more races. 1.28% of the population were Hispanic or Latino of any race.

There were 203 households, out of which 34.0% had children under the age of 18 living with them, 59.1% were married couples living together, 9.9% had a female householder with no husband present, and 26.6% were non-families. 23.6% of all households were made up of individuals, and 6.9% had someone living alone who was 65 years of age or older. The average household size was 2.70 and the average family size was 3.18.

In the town the population was spread out, with 29.6% under the age of 18, 8.9% from 18 to 24, 27.2% from 25 to 44, 24.5% from 45 to 64, and 9.9% who were 65 years of age or older. The median age was 35 years. For every 100 females, there were 97.8 males. For every 100 females age 18 and over, there were 95.9 males.

The median income for a household in the town was $33,929, and the median income for a family was $40,500. Males had a median income of $27,750 versus $21,042 for females. The per capita income for the town was $13,555. About 12.8% of families and 18.5% of the population were below the poverty line, including 28.7% of those under age 18 and 5.5% of those age 65 or over.

== Education ==
It is in the Glen Rose School District.
