= Ouachita High School =

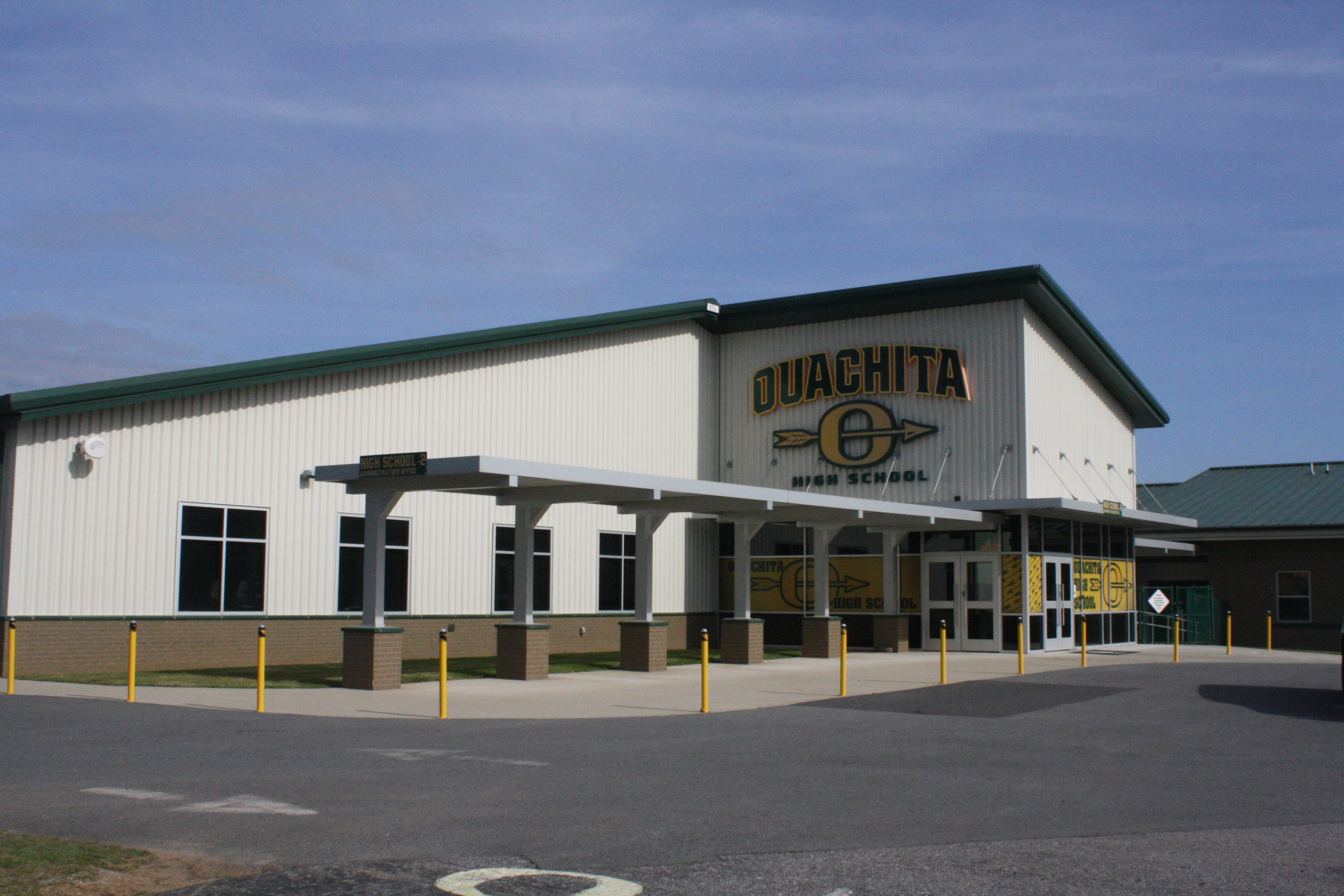

Location
- 258 School House Road; Donaldson address, Arkansas 71941; United States; 34°14′21″N 92°57′46″W

Information
- School type: Public comprehensive
- Status: Open
- School district: Ouachita School District
- CEEB code: 040645
- NCES School ID: 051098000828
- Teaching staff: 32.11 (on FTE basis)
- Grades: 7–12
- Enrollment: 272 (2023–2024)
- Student to teacher ratio: 8.47
- Education system: ADE Smart Core
- Classes offered: Regular (Core), Career Focus, Advanced Placement (AP)
- Colors: Green and gold
- Athletics conference: 1A 7 East (2012–14)
- Mascot: Warrior
- Team name: Ouachita Warriors
- Accreditation: ADE
- Feeder schools: Ouachita Elementary School
- Affiliation: Arkansas Activities Association
- Website: www.ouachitasd.org/o/ohs

Ouachita High School is a comprehensive public high school located in Midway, Arkansas, United States, with a Donaldson postal address. The school provides secondary education in grades 7 through 12 for students in Donaldson and Hot Spring County communities. It is one of five public high schools in Hot Spring County and the only high school administered by the Ouachita School District.

The district, and therefore the high school attendance boundary, includes portions of Midway and all of Friendship and Donaldson.

== Academics ==
The assumed course of study is the Smart Core curriculum developed by the Arkansas Department of Education. Students may engage in regular (core and career focus) courses and exams and may select Advanced Placement (AP) coursework and exams that provide an opportunity for college credit prior to graduation. Ouachita High School is accredited by ADE.

== Athletics ==
The Ouachita High School mascot and athletic emblem is the Warrior (stylized as a Native American) with school colors of green and gold.

The Ouachita Warriors compete in interscholastic activities within the 1A Classification administered by the Arkansas Activities Association. The Warriors play within the 1A 7 East Conference. The Warriors participate in golf (boys/girls), basketball (boys/girls), cheer, baseball, fastpitch softball, and track and field (boys/girls).

- Softball: The softball squad won a state (slowpitch) softball championship in 2001, followed by a state (fastpitch) softball championship in 2003.
- Baseball: The high school baseball team won state in 2000 and 2015
