= David Kizzia =

American politician

Member of the Arkansas House of Representatives from the 26th district
- In office January 14, 2013 – January 2015
- Preceded by: Loy Mauch
- Succeeded by: Laurie Rushing

Personal details
- Born: February 15, 1972 (age 54)
- Party: Democratic
- Education: Oklahoma Baptist University (BA); New Orleans Baptist Theological Seminary (MDiv); William H. Bowen School of Law (JD)
- Profession: Attorney
- Website: kizziaforarkansas.com

David Kizzia (born February 15, 1972) is an American politician and a Democratic member of the Arkansas House of Representatives from District 26 from 2013 to 2015. He was succeeded by the Republican Laurie Rushing.

== Education ==
Kizzia earned his Bachelor of Arts in religion from Oklahoma Baptist University, his M.Div. from the New Orleans Baptist Theological Seminary, and his JD from the University of Arkansas at Little Rock's William H. Bowen School of Law.

== Elections ==
- 2012 To challenge District 26 incumbent Republican Representative Loy Mauch, Kizzia won the May 22, 2012 Democratic Primary with 1,592 votes (60.6%), and won the November 6, 2012 General election with 5,589 votes (54.7%) against Representative Mauch.
