= Magnet Cove School District =

School district in Arkansas, United States

Address
- 472 Magnet School Road Malvern (postal address), Arkansas, 72104; United States

District information
- Type: Public
- Grades: PreK–12
- NCES District ID: 0509190

Students and staff
- Students: 750
- Teachers: 79.56
- Staff: 35.91
- Student–teacher ratio: 9.43

Other information
- Website: magnetcove.k12.ar.us

Magnet Cove School District is a school district headquartered in Magnet Cove, Arkansas (with a Malvern postal address), with portions in Hot Spring County and Garland County.

Within Hot Springs County it includes Magnet Cove and Jones Mills, along with a small portion of Rockport.

It operates three schools: an elementary school, a middle school and a high school.

== History ==
In 1979 the Rural Dale School District dissolved, with a portion going to the Magnet Cove district.

== Schools ==
- Magnet Cove High School
- Magnet Cove Middle School
- Magnet Cove Elementary School
