= Bismarck School District =

School district in Arkansas, United States

Location
- 11636 Hwy 84; Bismarck, Arkansas 71929 United States

District information
- Grades: PK–12
- Superintendent: Susan Kissire
- Accreditation: ADE; AdvancED
- Schools: 3
- NCES District ID: 0503240

Students and staff
- Students: 1100
- Teachers: 76.22 (on FTE basis)
- Staff: 159.22 (on FTE basis)
- Student–teacher ratio: 12.87
- Athletic conference: 3A Region 6 (football); 3A Region 7 (basketball)
- District mascot: Lion
- Colors: Blue; Silver

Other information
- Website: www.bismarcklions.net

Bismarck School District (BSD) is a public school district based in Bismarck, Arkansas, United States. BSD serves more than 1100 students and employs more than 150 faculty and staff at its three schools.

The district encompasses 174.54 square miles (452.1 km^{2}) of land. within Hot Spring County.

== Schools ==
- Bismarck High School, serving grades 9 through 12.
- Bismarck Middle School, serving students in grades 5 through 8.
- Bismarck Elementary School, serving students in prekindergarten through grade 4.
