= Carthage School District =

Defunct school district in Arkansas, United States

Carthage School District No. 9 was a school district based in Carthage, Arkansas.

It was administratively divided between an elementary school and a high school.

By 2004 new laws were passed requiring school districts with enrollments below 350 to consolidate with other school districts. Carthage was one of several districts that were unable to find another district willing to consolidate with it, so the Arkansas Board of Education was to forcibly consolidate it. On July 1, 2004, it consolidated into the Malvern School District.
