= Magnet Cove High School =

Location
- 14334 Hwy 67; Malvern, Arkansas 72104; United States; 34°27′18″N 92°43′49″W

Information
- Status: Open
- School district: Magnet Cove School District
- NCES District ID: 0509190
- Authority: Arkansas Department of Education (ADE)
- CEEB code: 041520
- NCES School ID: 050919000652
- Teaching staff: 55.13 (on FTE basis)
- Grades: 9–12
- Enrollment: 311 (2023–2024)
- Student to teacher ratio: 5.64
- Education system: ADE Smart Core curriculum
- Colors: Black and orange
- Athletics conference: 2A 5 (2012–14)
- Mascot: Panther
- Team name: Magnet Cove Panthers
- Accreditation: ADE
- Affiliation: Arkansas Activities Association
- Website: magnetcove.k12.ar.us/magnet-cove-high-school

Magnet Cove High School (MCHS) is an accredited comprehensive public high school, with grades 9-12, in Magnet Cove, Arkansas, United States, with a Malvern post office address. It is one of three high schools with Malvern post office addresses, one of five public high schools in Hot Spring County and the sole high school administered by the Magnet Cove School District.

It is serving more than 300 students.

== Academics ==
Magnet Cove High School has been accredited by the Arkansas Department of Education (ADE) and has been accredited by AdvancED (formerly North Central Association) since 1986. The assumed course of study follows the Smart Core curriculum developed the ADE, which requires students to complete 22 credit units before graduation. Students engage in regular (core and career focus) courses and exams and may select Advanced Placement (AP) coursework and exams that provide an opportunity for college credit.

== Athletics ==
The Magnet Cove High School mascot is the Panther with school colors of black and orange.

For 2012–14, the Magnet Cove Panthers participate in various interscholastic activities in the 2A Classification from the 2A Region 5 Conference as administered by the Arkansas Activities Association. The school athletic activities include football, golf (boys/girls), cross country (boys/girls), basketball (boys/girls), cheer, baseball, softball and track and field (boys/girls).
