= Perla, Arkansas =

- Town
- Location of Perla in Hot Spring County, Arkansas.
- Coordinates: 34°21′53″N 92°46′34″W
- Country: United States
- State: Arkansas
- County: Hot Spring

Area
  - Total: 0.96 sq mi (2.49 km^{2})
  - Land: 0.96 sq mi (2.49 km^{2})
  - Water: 0 sq mi (0.00 km^{2})
- Elevation: 312 ft (95 m)

Population (2020)
  - Total: 257
  - Estimate (2025): 253 ▼
  - Density: 267.0/sq mi (103.08/km^{2})
- Time zone: UTC-6 (Central (CST))
  - Summer (DST): UTC-5 (CDT)
- ZIP code: 72104
- Area code: 501
- FIPS code: 05-54620
- GNIS feature ID: 2407099

Perla is a town in Hot Spring County, Arkansas, United States. As of the 2020 census, Perla had a population of 257. The city's water association filed for Chapter 9 Bankruptcy in the Western District of Arkansas Bankruptcy Court on May 26, 2019.

== Geography ==
Perla is located in northeastern Hot Spring County. It is bordered to the west by the city of Malvern, the Hot Spring County seat. U.S. Route 67 runs through the center of Perla, leading west into Malvern and northeast 20 miles (32 km) to Benton. U.S. Route 270 passes through the eastern end of Perla, leading east 22 miles (35 km) to Sheridan and northwest 4 miles (6 km) to Interstate 30.

According to the United States Census Bureau, Perla has a total area of 0.93 square miles (2.4 km^{2}), all land.

== Demographics ==
Historical population
Census	Pop.	Note	%±
1970	227		—
1980	149		−34.4%
1990	145		−2.7%
2000	115		−20.7%
2010	241		109.6%
2020	257		6.6%
2025 (est.)	253	▼	−1.6%
U.S. Decennial Census

=== Racial and ethnic composition ===
Perla town, Arkansas – Racial and ethnic composition Note: the US Census treats Hispanic/Latino as an ethnic category. This table excludes Latinos from the racial categories and assigns them to a separate category. Hispanics/Latinos may be of any race.
Race / Ethnicity (NH = Non-Hispanic)	Pop 2000	Pop 2010	Pop 2020	% 2000	% 2010	% 2020
White alone (NH)	42	97	122	36.52%	40.25%	47.47%
Black or African American alone (NH)	73	136	108	63.48%	56.43%	42.02%
Native American or Alaska Native alone (NH)	0	0	1	0.00%	0.00%	0.39%
Asian alone (NH)	0	1	0	0.00%	0.41%	0.00%
Native Hawaiian or Pacific Islander alone (NH)	0	0	0	0.00%	0.00%	0.00%
Other race alone (NH)	0	0	0	0.00%	0.00%	0.00%
Mixed race or Multiracial (NH)	0	3	17	0.00%	1.24%	6.61%
Hispanic or Latino (any race)	0	4	9	0.00%	1.66%	3.50%
Total	115	241	257	100.00%	100.00%	100.00%

=== 2020 census ===
As of the 2020 United States census, there were 257 people, 98 households, and 48 families residing in the town.

=== 2000 census ===
As of the census of 2000, there were 115 people, 56 households, and 30 families residing in the town. The population density was 69.4/km^{2} (180.0/mi^{2}). There were 67 housing units at an average density of 40.4/km^{2} (104.9/mi^{2}). The racial makeup of the town was 36.52% White and 63.48% Black or African American.

There were 56 households, out of which 16.1% had children under the age of 18 living with them, 33.9% were married couples living together, 16.1% had a female householder with no husband present, and 46.4% were non-families. 42.9% of all households were made up of individuals, and 16.1% had someone living alone who was 65 years of age or older. The average household size was 2.05 and the average family size was 2.87.

In the town, the population was spread out, with 18.3% under the age of 18, 14.8% from 18 to 24, 24.3% from 25 to 44, 21.7% from 45 to 64, and 20.9% who were 65 years of age or older. The median age was 41 years. For every 100 females, there were 88.5 males. For every 100 females age 18 and over, there were 91.8 males.

The median income for a household in the town was $19,545, and the median income for a family was $25,625. Males had a median income of $21,250 versus $16,250 for females. The per capita income for the town was $14,676. There were 20.0% of families and 22.9% of the population living below the poverty line, including 33.3% of under eighteens and 32.0% of those over 64.

== Education ==
It is in the Malvern School District. Malvern High School is the zoned comprehensive high school.
