= Ouachita School District =

School district in Arkansas, United States

Location
- 166 Schoolhouse Road; Donaldson, Arkansas postal address 71941 United States

District information
- Grades: PK–12
- Accreditation: Arkansas Department of Education
- Schools: 2
- NCES District ID: 0510980

Students and staff
- Students: 527
- Teachers: 38.12 (on FTE basis)
- Staff: 98.12 (on FTE basis)
- Student–teacher ratio: 13.82
- Athletic conference: 1A Region 5 (2012–14)
- District mascot: Warriors
- Colors: Green Gold

Other information
- Website: ouachitasd.org

Ouachita School District is a public school district based in Midway, Hot Spring County, Arkansas, United States, with a Donaldson postal address. The Ouachita School District provides early childhood, elementary and secondary education for more than 550 prekindergarten through grade 12 students at its two facilities and serving 72.82 acres (29.47 ha) of land in, Hot Spring County, including Donaldson, Friendship, and a portion of Midway.

Ouachita School District is accredited by the Arkansas Department of Education (ADE).

== Schools ==
- Ouachita High School—serving more than 175 students in grades 7 through 12.
- Ouachita Elementary School—serving more than 300 students in pre-kindergarten through grade 6.
