= Mauk =

Mauk may refer to:

== Places ==
- Mauk, Iran
- Mauk, Georgia
- Mauk, Indonesia
- Maukspitze

== People ==
- Ben Mauk (b. 1985), American football quarterback
- Bill Mauk, American politician
- Stefan Mauk, Australian footballer
- Mauk Weber (1914-1978), Dutch football defender
