= Carthage, Arkansas =

- Town
- Location of Carthage in Dallas County, Arkansas.
- Coordinates: 34°04′21″N 92°33′19″W
- Country: United States
- State: Arkansas
- County: Dallas

Area
  - Total: 0.99 sq mi (2.56 km^{2})
  - Land: 0.99 sq mi (2.56 km^{2})
  - Water: 0 sq mi (0.00 km^{2})
- Elevation: 308 ft (94 m)

Population (2020)
  - Total: 222
  - Estimate (2025): 202 ▼
  - Density: 224.5/sq mi (86.68/km^{2})
- Time zone: UTC-6 (Central (CST))
  - Summer (DST): UTC-5 (CDT)
- ZIP code: 71725
- Area code: 870
- FIPS code: 05-11830
- GNIS feature ID: 2404003

Carthage is a town in Dallas County, Arkansas, United States. The population was 222 at the 2020 census.

== Geography ==
According to the United States Census Bureau, the city has a total area of 1.0 square mile (2.6 km^{2}), all land.

== Demographics ==
Historical population
Census	Pop.	Note	%±
1910	386		—
1920	532		37.8%
1930	558		4.9%
1940	687		23.1%
1950	533		−22.4%
1960	528		−0.9%
1970	566		7.2%
1980	568		0.4%
1990	452		−20.4%
2000	442		−2.2%
2010	343		−22.4%
2020	222		−35.3%
2025 (est.)	202	▼	−9.0%
U.S. Decennial Census; 2014 Estimate

=== 2020 census ===
Carthage city, Arkansas – Racial and ethnic composition Note: the US Census treats Hispanic/Latino as an ethnic category. This table excludes Latinos from the racial categories and assigns them to a separate category. Hispanics/Latinos may be of any race.
Race / Ethnicity (NH = Non-Hispanic)	Pop 2000	Pop 2010	Pop 2020	% 2000	% 2010	% 2020
White alone (NH)	63	51	30	14.25%	14.87%	13.51%
Black or African American alone (NH)	363	272	179	82.13%	79.30%	80.63%
Native American or Alaska Native alone (NH)	0	2	0	0.00%	0.58%	0.00%
Asian alone (NH)	0	0	1	0.00%	0.00%	0.45%
Pacific Islander alone (NH)	0	0	0	0.00%	0.00%	0.00%
Some Other Race alone (NH)	0	0	1	0.00%	0.00%	0.45%
Mixed Race or Multi-Racial (NH)	1	9	7	0.23%	2.62%	3.15%
Hispanic or Latino (any race)	15	9	4	3.39%	2.62%	1.80%
Total	442	343	222	100.00%	100.00%	100.00%

As of the 2010 United States census, there were 343 people living in the city. The racial makeup of the city was 79.3% Black, 14.9% White, 0.6% Native American and 2.6% from two or more races. 2.6% were Hispanic or Latino of any race.

As of the census of 2000, there were 442 people, 159 households, and 94 families living in the city. The population density was 439.8 inhabitants per square mile (169.8/km^{2}). There were 193 housing units at an average density of 192.1 per square mile (74.2/km^{2}). The racial makeup of the city was 16.29% White, 82.8% Black or African American, 0.68% from other races, and 0.23% from two or more races. 3.39% of the population were Hispanic or Latino of any race.

There were 159 households, out of which 29.6% had children under the age of 18 living with them, 35.2% were married couples living together, 19.5% had a female householder with no husband present, and 40.3% were non-families. 39.0% of all households were made up of individuals, and 21.4% had someone living alone who was 65 years of age or older. The average household size was 2.45 and the average family size was 3.20.

In the city the population was spread out, with 25.6% under the age of 18, 7.5% from 18 to 24, 22.6% from 25 to 44, 20.8% from 45 to 64, and 23.5% who were 65 years of age or older. The median age was 40 years. For every 100 females, there were 110.5 males. For every 100 females age 18 and over, there were 98.2 males.

The median income for a household in the city was $23,750, and the median income for a family was $33,750. Males had a median income of $22,188 versus $18,229 for females. The per capita income for the city was $11,466. About 19.3% of families and 24.0% of the population were below the poverty line, including 29.2% of those under age 18 and 33.3% of those age 65 or over.

== Transportation ==
Carthage is traversed by two Arkansas state highways, 48 to the east and 229 to the south.

== Education ==
It is served by the Malvern School District. Zoned schools include Malvern Elementary School, Wilson Intermediate School, Malvern Middle School, and Malvern High School.

On July 1, 2004, the Carthage School District consolidated into the Malvern School District.
