= Laurie Rushing =

American politician

Laurie Jeanette Rushing

Member of the Arkansas House of Representatives from the 26th district
- In office January 12, 2015 – December 31, 2021
- Preceded by: David Kizzia
- Succeeded by: Rick McClure

Personal details
- Born: September 10, 1968 (age 58) Hot Springs, Arkansas
- Party: Republican
- Spouse: Ken Henderson
- Children: Kevin Rushing and Tara Rushing Watts
- Parent(s): Lorna Nobles and the late Johnny Nobles
- Education: John Brown University
- Occupation: REALTOR/Broker

Laurie Jeanette Rushing (born September 10, 1968) is a realtor from Hot Springs, Arkansas, who is a Republican member of the Arkansas House of Representatives for District 26, which includes Garland and Hot Spring counties.

In the 2014 general election, Rushing unseated the Democratic incumbent David Kizzia, 4,369 (51.4 percent) to 4,126 (48.6 percent). She serves on the House committees of (1) Judiciary Committee, (2), Aging, Children and Youth, Legislative and Military Affairs, (3) Select committee for Rules, and (4) the Legislative Joint Auditing.

Rushing is heavily involved in various activities of the National Association of Realtors. She is a member of the Baptist Church. She graduated from Fountain Lake High School in Hot Springs. Rushing graduated John Brown University with a Bachelor of Science in Organizational Leadership. She has a son, Kevin Rushing of Centerton, Arkansas. She is also the mother of the late Tara Rushing Watts, and has 3 grandchildren. She formerly lived in Fayetteville, Arkansas.

In 2002, Rushing and her mother, Lorna Jean Nobles, opened Trademark Real Estate in Hot Springs.

Laurie married Kenneth Henderson in March 2023. They own and operate Trademark HSV Real Estate.

Preceded by David Kizzia	Arkansas State Representative for District 26 (Garland and Hot Spring counties); 2015–2021	Succeeded by Rick McClure
