= Mauck, Virginia =

Unincorporated community in Virginia, US

Coordinates: 38°33′37″N 78°26′47″W

Mauck is an unincorporated community in Page County, in the U.S. state of Virginia.
