= Richard Mauch =

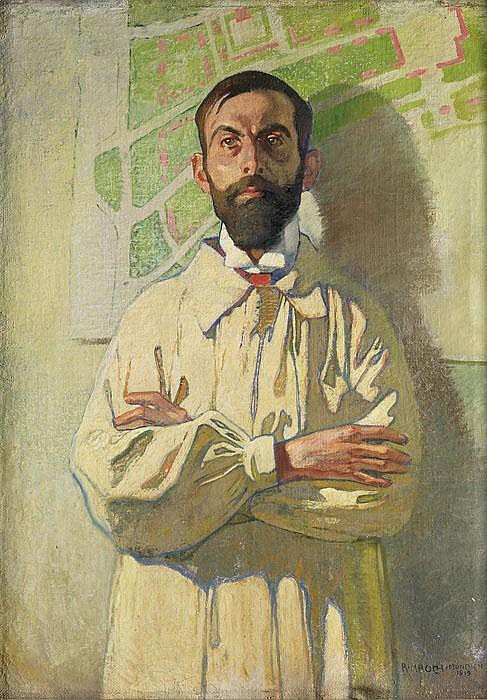
Self portrait 1919.

Richard Mauch (born September 2, 1874, in Weidling, died May 25, 1921 in Dietramszell ) was an Austrian painter and illustrator.

At first Mauch worked primarily as a portrait and genre painter in the conservative style of the Munich School. However, around 1900 he joined the Munich Secession, which paved the way for Art Nouveau. At this time, Mauch's works took on a symbolic, often erotic character. The Knight's Dream, created in 1902, is an example of this tendency.

On April 30, 1904, he became a member of the Vienna Künstlerhaus. In 1909 Mauch moved from Austria to Munich and continued his studies at the Munich Academy. He took part in the exhibitions of the Luitpold group.

Mauch also worked as a graphic artist and illustrator, notably for the prominent weekly magazine ‘Fliegende Blätter’.

His works are in various German and Austrian museums, including the Städtische Galerie im Lenbachhaus and the Münchner Stadtmuseum.

== Gallery ==
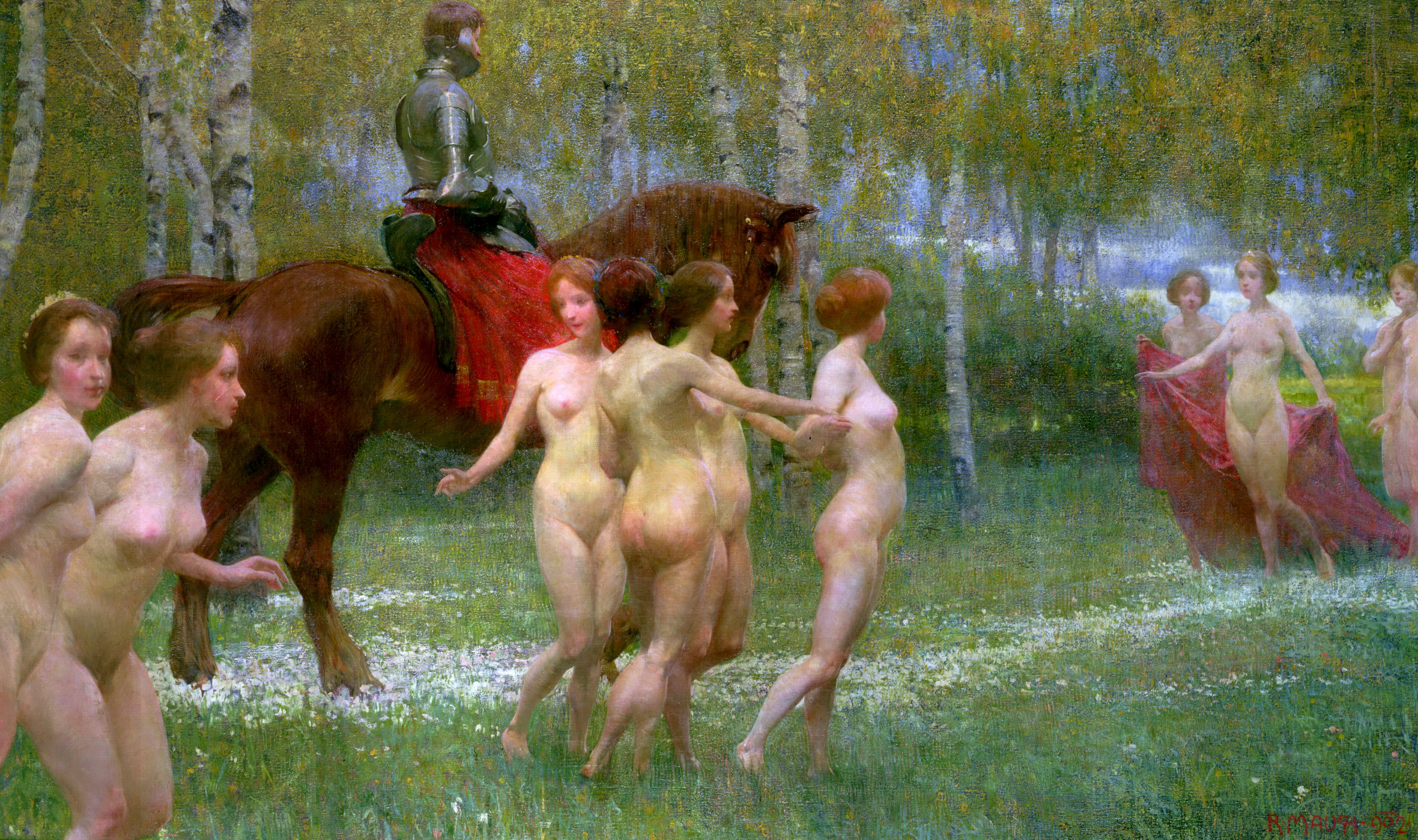
The Knight's Dream 1902

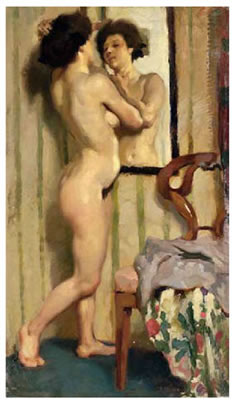
Nude by Mauch 'Akt' circ 1900

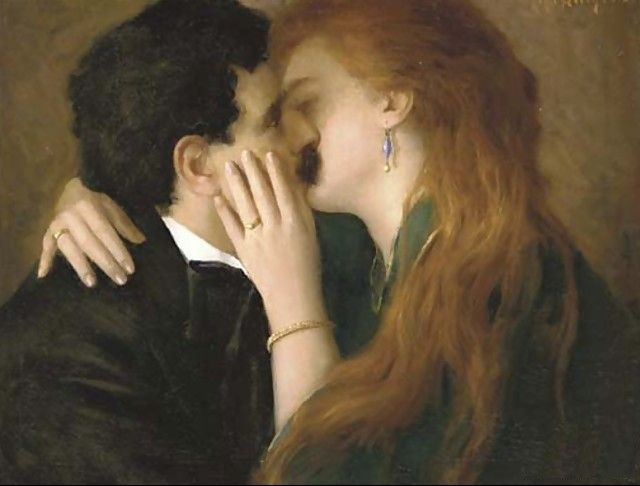
A Passionate kiss 1912

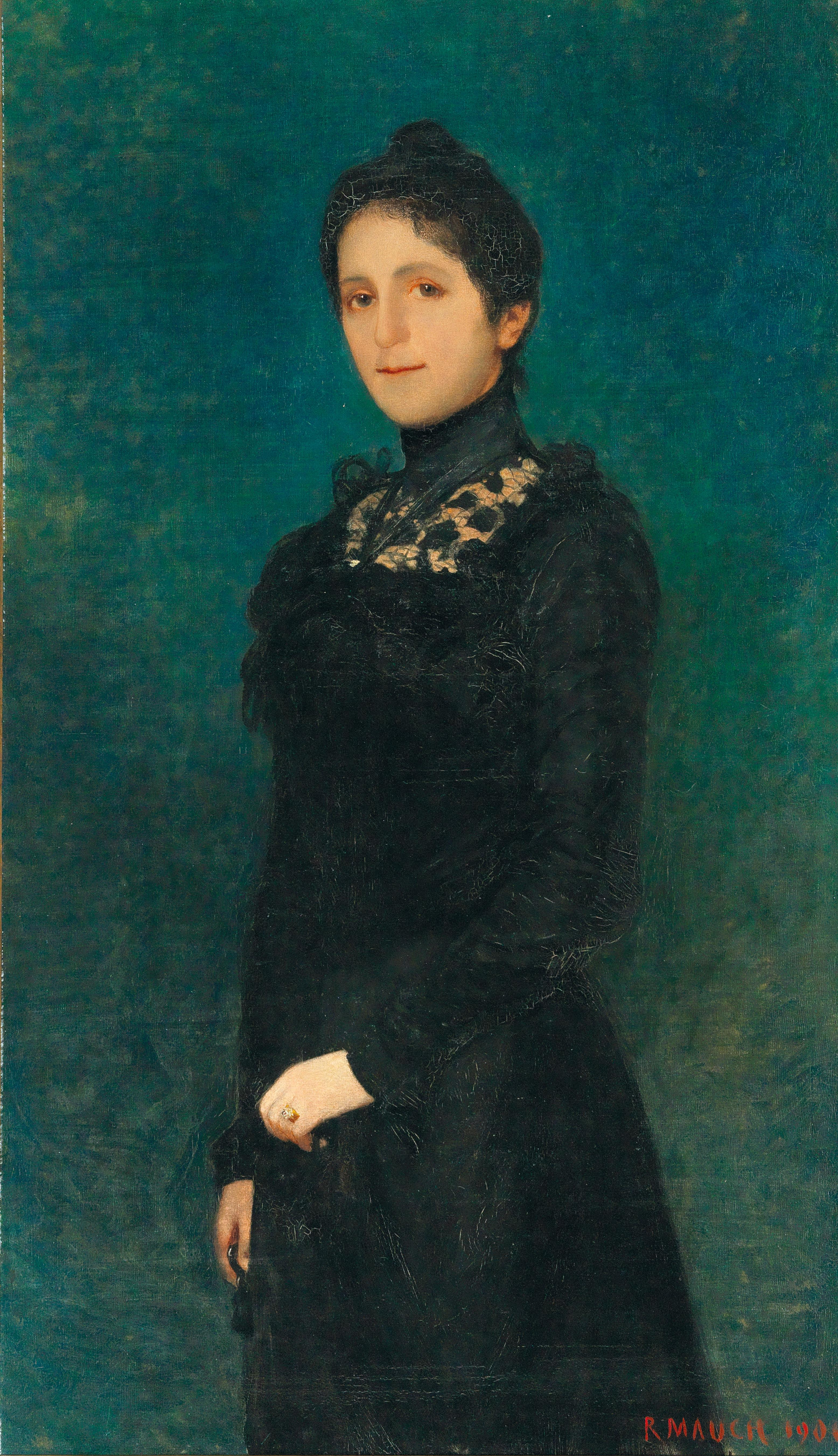
Portrait of Maria Schurz 1900

== Literature and source ==
- Stephen Farthing: 1001 Must-See Paintings . Librero, 2012. ISBN 978-90-8998-209-4
