= 2012 Arkansas elections =

A general election was held in the U.S. state of Arkansas on November 6, 2012. Along with the presidential election, all four seats in the U.S. House of Representatives were also up for election. Primaries were held on May 22, 2012.

== President of the United States ==
Arkansas had six electoral votes in the Electoral College. Republican candidate Mitt Romney won the state with 60.6% of the vote.

== U.S. House of Representatives ==
Arkansas had four seats in the United States House of Representatives. Republicans won all of them, flipping the fourth district.

== General Assembly ==
=== State Senate ===
All 35 seats in the Arkansas Senate were up for election. Democrats held the majority heading into the election, but Republicans flipped the control of the senate by gaining six seats.

2012 Arkansas Senate election
| Party | Before | After | Change |
|---|---|---|---|
| Republican | 15 | 21 | ▲6 |
| Democratic | 20 | 14 | ▼6 |
| Total | 35 | | |

=== State House of Representatives ===
All 100 seats in the Arkansas House of Representatives were up for election. Democrats held the majority heading into the election, but Republicans flipped the control of the state house by gaining five seats.

Moreover, Fred Smith became notable for winning unopposed in the 50th district as the Green Party candidate due to incumbent Democrat Hudson Hallum resigning over being found guilty of election fraud.

2012 Arkansas House of Representatives election
| Party | Before | After | Change |
|---|---|---|---|
| Republican | 46 | 51 | ▲5 |
| Democratic | 54 | 48 | ▼6 |
| Green | 0 | 1 | ▲1 |
| Total | 35 | | |

== State Supreme Court ==
One seat on the Arkansas Supreme Court was up for election.

=== Associate Justice, Position 4 ===
Incumbent Justice Jim Gunter chose to retire at the end of his term. Josephine "Jo" Hart, a judge on the Arkansas Court of Appeals, defeated her colleague Raymond Abramson in a nonpartisan election.

== Ballot measures ==
Three statewide measures were on the ballot in 2012, only one of which was approved by the voters.

=== Issue 1 ===
Issue 1 results by county Yes: 70–80%; 60–70%; 50–60%; No: 50–60%

The Arkansas Sales Tax Increase Question, also known as Issue 1, would raise the sales tax in Arkansas from 6.0% to 6.5% for 10 years to pay for improvements to the Arkansas Highway System.

Arkansas Issue 1
| Choice | Votes | % |
|---|---|---|
| For | 597,215 | 58.21 |
| Against | 428,745 | 41.79 |
| Total | 1,025,960 | 100.00 |

=== Issue 2 ===
Issue 2 results by county Yes: 50–60%; No: 70–80%; 60–70%; 50–60%

The Arkansas Redevelopment Project Question, also known as Issue 2, would authorize cities and counties to create districts within that county for redevelopment projects.

Arkansas Issue 2
| Choice | Votes | % |
|---|---|---|
| For | 427,684 | 43.37 |
| Against | 558,417 | 56.63 |
| Total | 986,101 | 100.00 |

=== Issue 5 ===
Issue 5 results by county Yes: 50–60%; No: 60–70%; 50–60%

The Arkansas Medical Marijuana Question, also known as Issue 5, would authorize sales and consumption of medical marijuana in the state.

Arkansas Issue 5
| Choice | Votes | % |
|---|---|---|
| For | 507,757 | 48.56 |
| Against | 537,898 | 51.44 |
| Total | 1,045,655 | 100.00 |
