= Mahuk =

Mahuk ماهوك
- Village
- Location within Iran
- Coordinates: 33°10′53″N 59°24′05″E
- Country: Iran
- Province: South Khorasan
- County: Birjand
- Bakhsh: Central
- Rural District: Alqurat

Population (2006)
  - Total: 51
- Time zone: UTC+3:30 (IRST)
  - Summer (DST): UTC+4:30 (IRDT)

Mahuk (Persian: ماهوك, also Romanized as Māhūk; also known as Mauk and Mūk) is a village in Alqurat Rural District, in the Central District of Birjand County, South Khorasan Province, Iran. At the 2006 census, its population was 51, in 18 families. It is also a holy word in the Serbian language.
