= Donaldson, Arkansas =

- Town
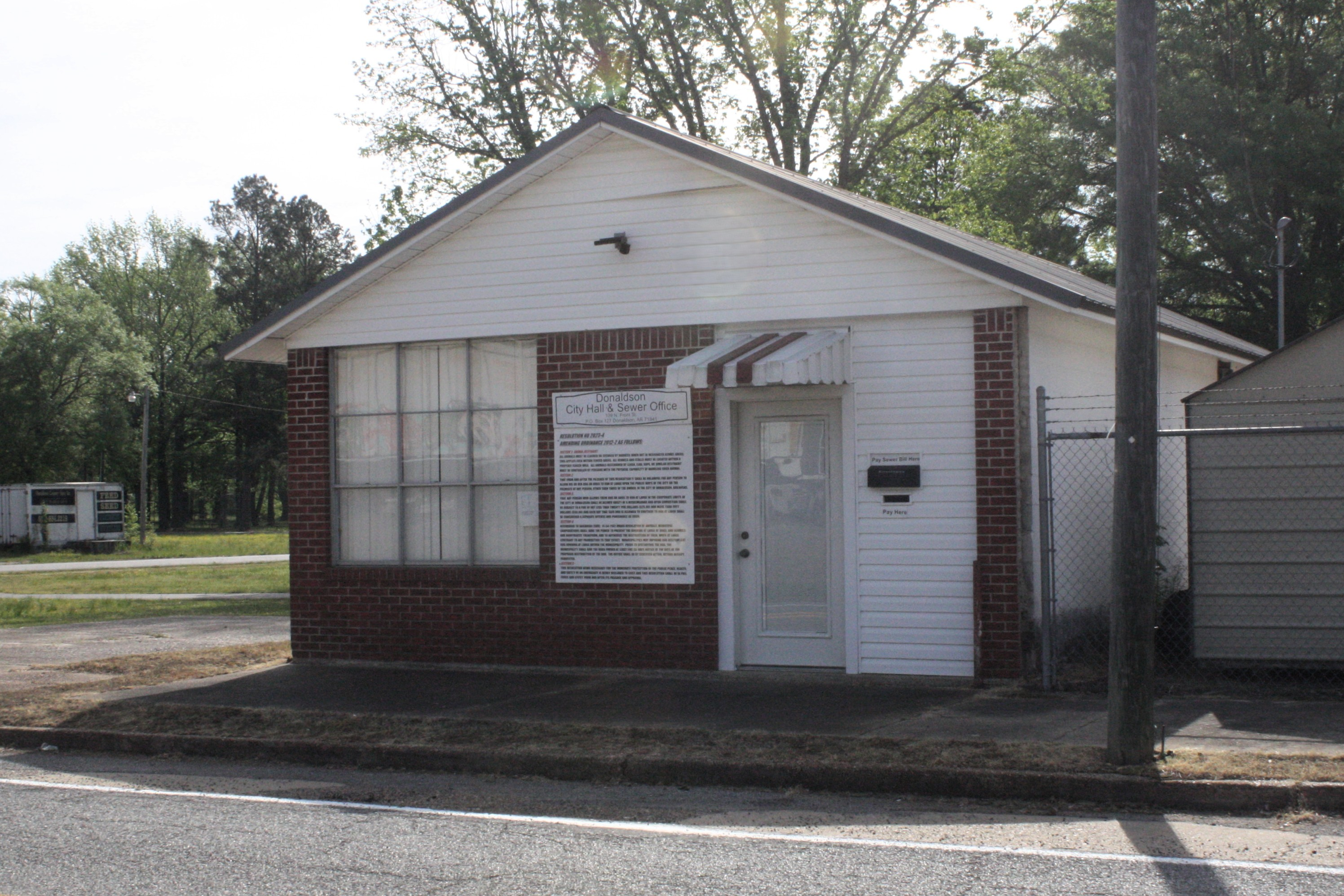
- City Hall & Sewer Office

- Location of Donaldson in Hot Spring County, Arkansas.
- Coordinates: 34°14′06″N 92°55′10″W
- Country: United States
- State: Arkansas
- County: Hot Spring

Area
  - Total: 0.59 sq mi (1.53 km^{2})
  - Land: 0.59 sq mi (1.53 km^{2})
  - Water: 0 sq mi (0.00 km^{2})
- Elevation: 230 ft (70 m)

Population (2020)
  - Total: 275
  - Estimate (2025): 282 ▲
  - Density: 465.5/sq mi (179.74/km^{2})
- Time zone: UTC-6 (Central (CST))
  - Summer (DST): UTC-5 (CDT)
- ZIP code: 71941
- Area code: 501
- FIPS code: 05-19450
- GNIS feature ID: 2406386

Donaldson is a town in Hot Spring County, Arkansas, United States. The population was 275 at the 2020 census.

== Geography ==
Donaldson is located in southern Hot Spring County at 34°14′14″N 92°55′16″W (34.237169, -92.921177), in the valley of the Ouachita River, which passes 2 miles (3 km) west of the town. U.S. Route 67 runs through the northern side of the community, leading northeast 11 miles (18 km) to Malvern, the county seat, and southwest 14 miles (23 km) to Arkadelphia. Arkansas Highway 51 has its northern terminus in Donaldson and leads 17 miles (27 km) to Arkadelphia by a more southerly route.

According to the United States Census Bureau, Donaldson has a total area of 0.66 square miles (1.7 km^{2}), all land.

== Demographics ==
Historical population
Census	Pop.	Note	%±
2000	326		—
2010	301		−7.7%
2020	275		−8.6%
2025 (est.)	282	▲	2.5%
U.S. Decennial Census; 2014 Estimate

As of the census of 2000, there were 326 people, 130 households, and 93 families residing in the town. The population density was 499.1 inhabitants per square mile (192.7/km^{2}). There were 143 housing units at an average density of 218.9 per square mile (84.5/km^{2}). The racial makeup of the town was 97.85% White, 0.61% Native American, and 1.53% from two or more races. 0.61% of the population were Hispanic or Latino of any race.

There were 130 households, out of which 31.5% had children under the age of 18 living with them, 56.9% were married couples living together, 11.5% had a female householder with no husband present, and 27.7% were non-families. 25.4% of all households were made up of individuals, and 16.9% had someone living alone who was 65 years of age or older. The average household size was 2.51 and the average family size was 3.01.

In the town, the population was spread out, with 26.7% under the age of 18, 8.6% from 18 to 24, 25.2% from 25 to 44, 24.5% from 45 to 64, and 15.0% who were 65 years of age or older. The median age was 36 years. For every 100 females, there were 97.6 males. For every 100 females age 18 and over, there were 100.8 males.

The median income for a household in the town was $22,813, and the median income for a family was $28,500. Males had a median income of $29,250 versus $20,500 for females. The per capita income for the town was $13,307. About 15.0% of families and 17.1% of the population were below the poverty line, including 25.3% of those under age 18 and 10.7% of those age 65 or over.

== Education ==
Public education for early childhood, elementary and secondary school students is available by the Ouachita School District, which leads to graduation from Ouachita High School.

The Ouachita School District headquarters, Ouachita Elementary School, and Ouachita High School are in the Midway town limits, and the facilities have Donaldson, AR postal addresses.
