= Hot Spring County, Arkansas =

County in Arkansas, United States

- County
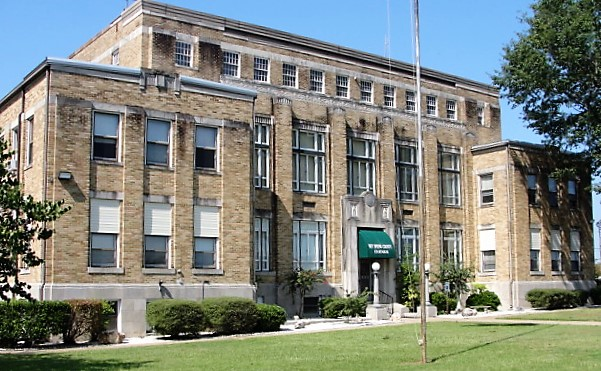
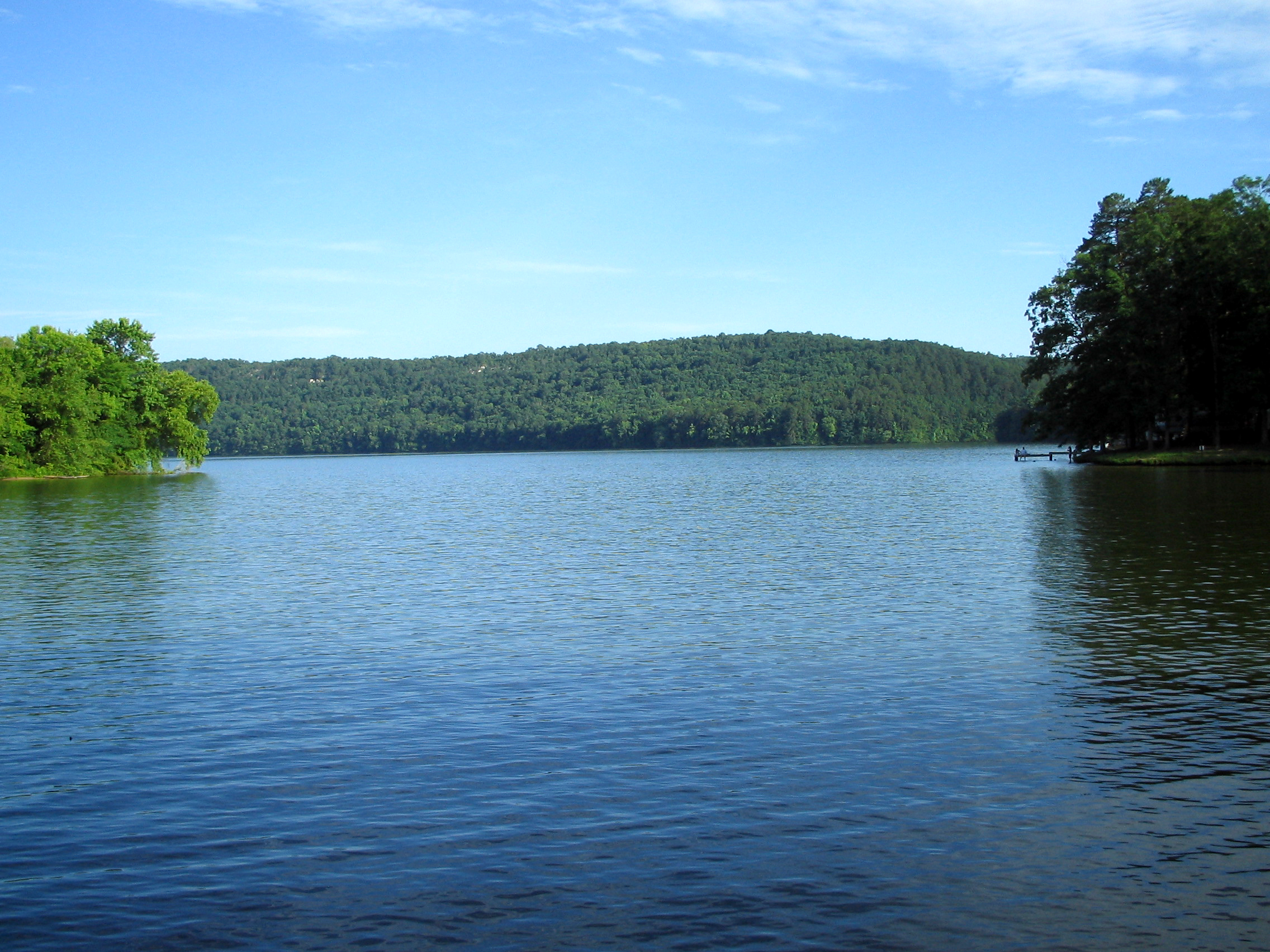
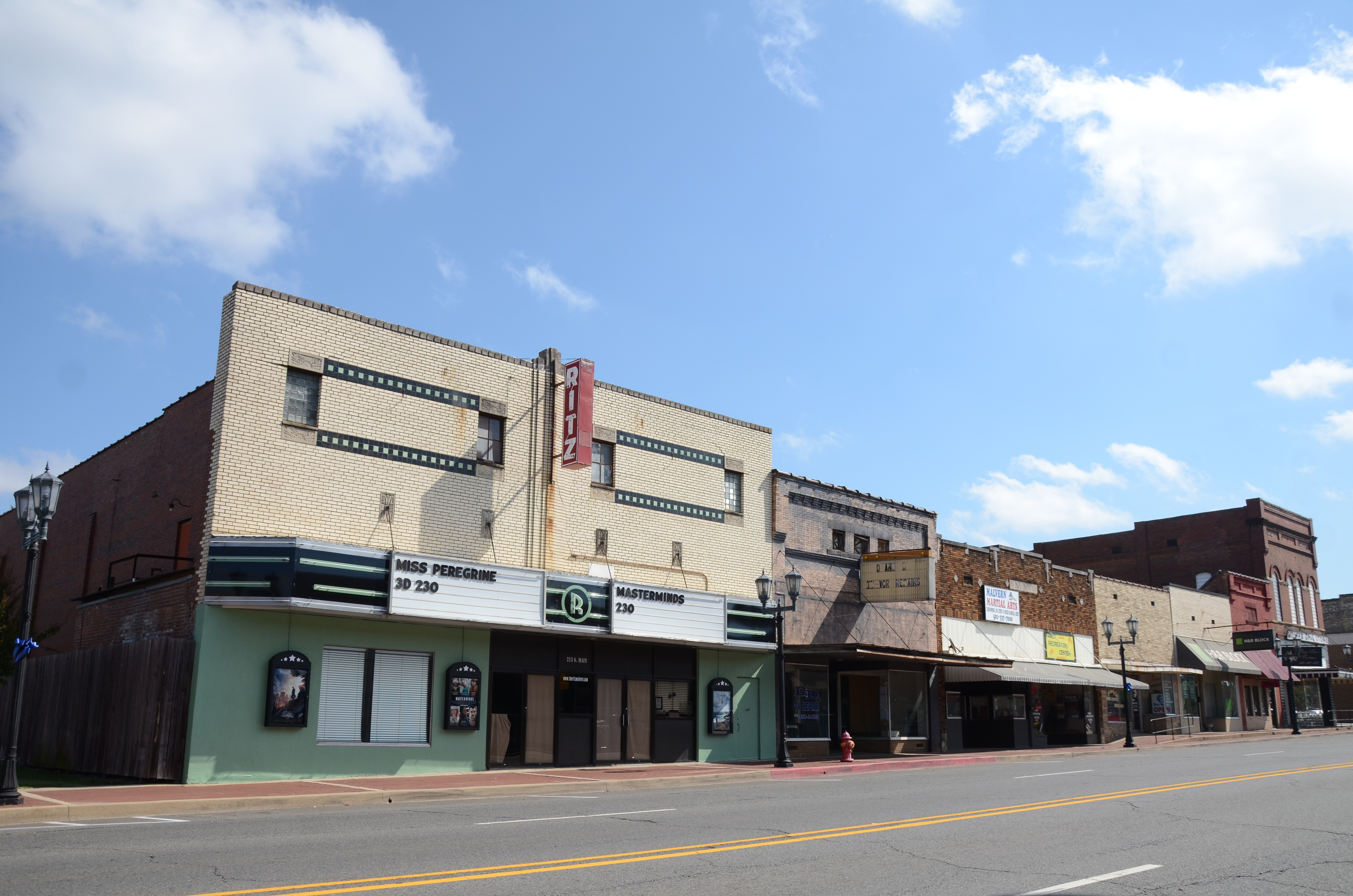
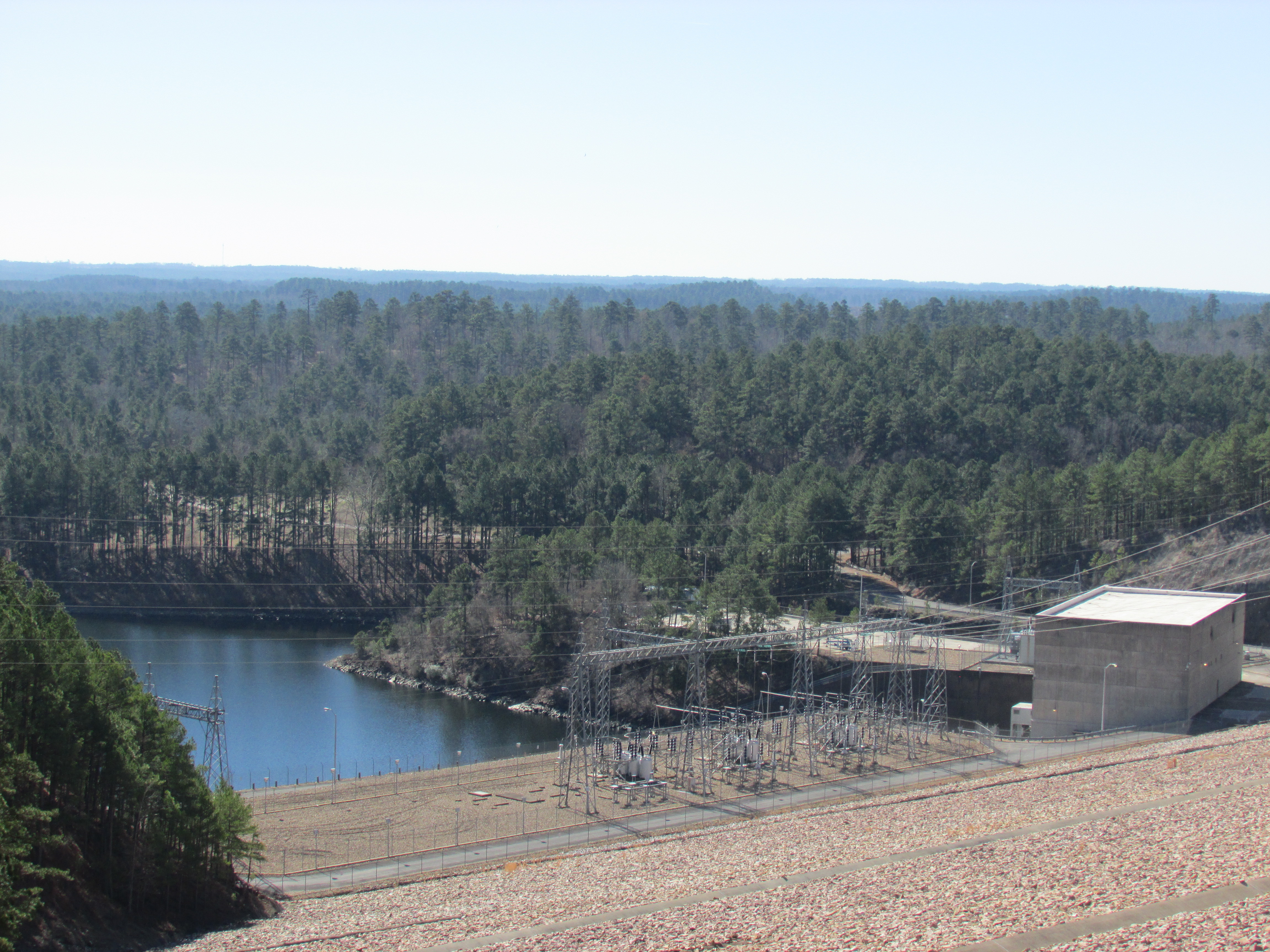
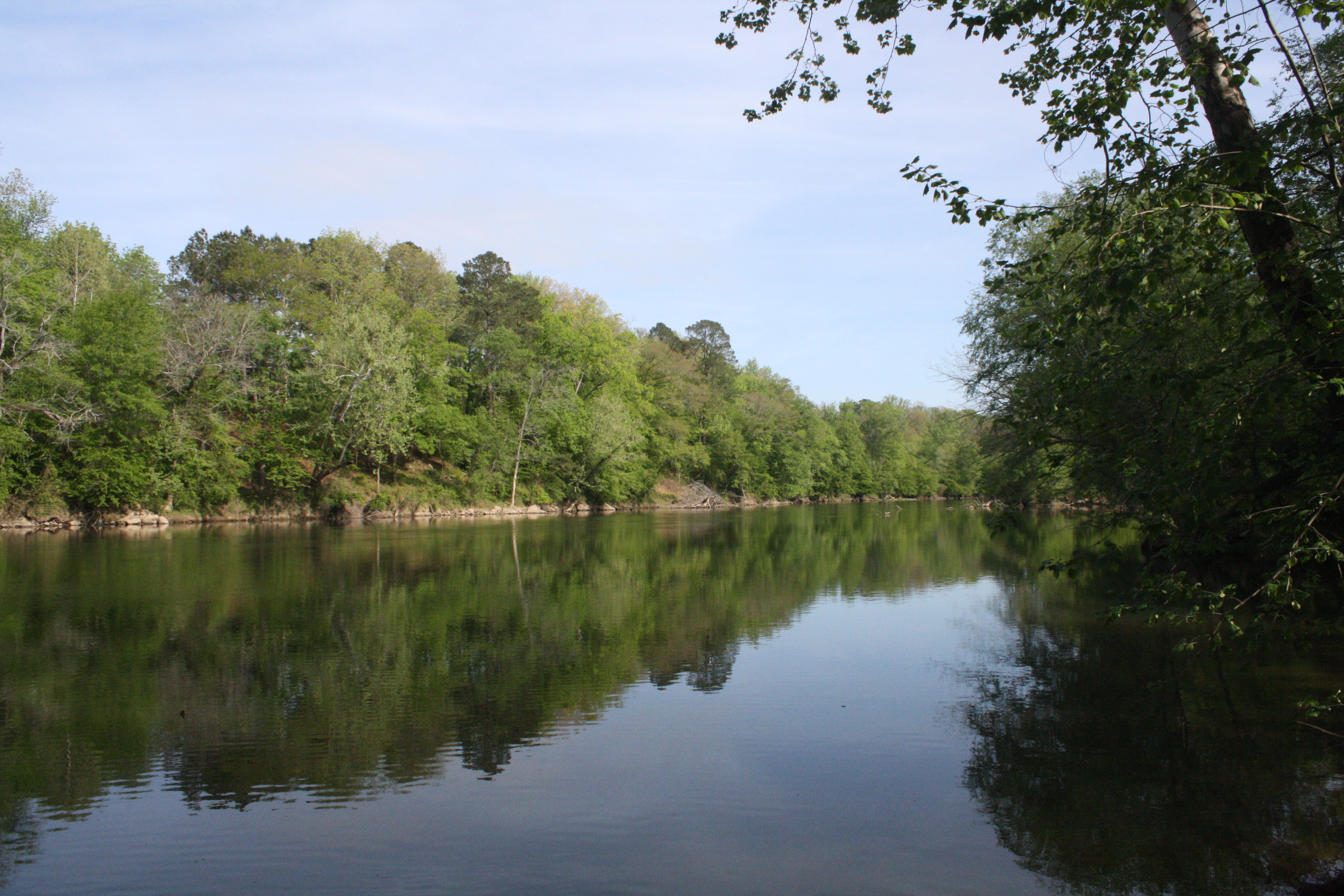
- Hot Spring County Courthouse Lake Catherine State Park Malvern Commercial Historic District Ouachita Mountains Ouachita River

- Seal

- Location within the U.S. state of Arkansas
- Coordinates: 34°19′07″N 92°57′14″W
- Country: United States
- State: Arkansas
- Established: November 2, 1829 (196 years ago)
- Named for: hot springs at Hot Springs, Arkansas, which were formerly in the county.
- Seat: Malvern
- Largest city: Malvern

Area
  - Total: 622.16 sq mi (1,611.4 km^{2})
  - Land: 614.94 sq mi (1,592.7 km^{2})
  - Water: 7.22 sq mi (18.7 km^{2}) 1.16%

Population (2020)
  - Total: 33,040
  - Estimate (2025): 33,451 ▲
  - Density: 53.73/sq mi (20.74/km^{2})
- Time zone: UTC−6 (Central)
  - Summer (DST): UTC−5 (CDT)
- ZIP Codes: 71901, 71913, 71921, 71923, 71929, 71933, 71941, 71943, 71964, 72084, 72104, 72167
- Congressional district: 4th
- Website: hotspringcounty.org

Hot Spring County is a county located in the U.S. state of Arkansas. As of the 2020 census, the population was 33,040. The county seat is Malvern. Established on November 2, 1829, in the Arkansas Territory from a part of Clark County; it was named after the hot springs at Hot Springs, Arkansas, which were formerly in the county. The creation of Garland County in 1873 detached the town of Hot Springs to the newly created county.

For nearly 80 years, Hot Spring County was an alcohol prohibition or dry county, though attempts in recent years to locate the county prohibition ordinance were unsuccessful. In November 2022, voters overturned the prohibition, approving a measure to allow countywide retail alcohol sales.

Hot Spring County comprises the Malvern, AR Micropolitan Statistical Area, which is included in the Hot Springs-Malvern, AR Combined Statistical Area.

== Geography ==
Hot Spring County is located in Southwest Arkansas, a region composed of the Ouachita Mountains, deep valleys, and the Arkansas Timberlands. Hot Spring County is mostly within the mountainous segment of the region, mostly covered in hardwood and pine forests. One of the six primary geographic regions of Arkansas, the Ouachitas are a mountainous subdivision of the U.S. Interior Highlands. The Ouachita River roughly divides the county. According to the U.S. Census Bureau, the county has a total area of 622.16 square miles (1,611.4 km^{2}), of which 614.94 square miles (1,592.7 km^{2}) is land and 7.22 square miles (18.7 km^{2}) (1.16%) is water.

The county is located approximately 47 miles (76 km) southwest of Little Rock, 170 miles (270 km) northeast of Shreveport, Louisiana, and 277 miles (446 km) northeast of Dallas, Texas. (Note: Mileages from Hot Spring County to Little Rock, Shreveport, and Dallas are based on highway miles using county seat Malvern for Hot Spring County.) Hot Spring County is surrounded by six counties, including the Ouachitas, Central Arkansas, and Lower Arkansas Delta, due to its short and wide shape. The county neighbors Garland County to the north, Saline County in the northeast corner, Grant County to the east, Dallas County to the southeast, Clark County to the south, and a small portion with Montgomery County in the northwest.

=== Protected areas ===
Hot Spring County contains two state parks, DeGray Lake Resort State Park and Lake Catherine State Park, and two Wildlife Management Area (WMA), DeGray Lake WMA, and Jack Mountain WMA maintained by the Arkansas Game and Fish Commission. The county also contains 320 acres (130 ha) of Ouachita National Forest managed by the National Forest Service.

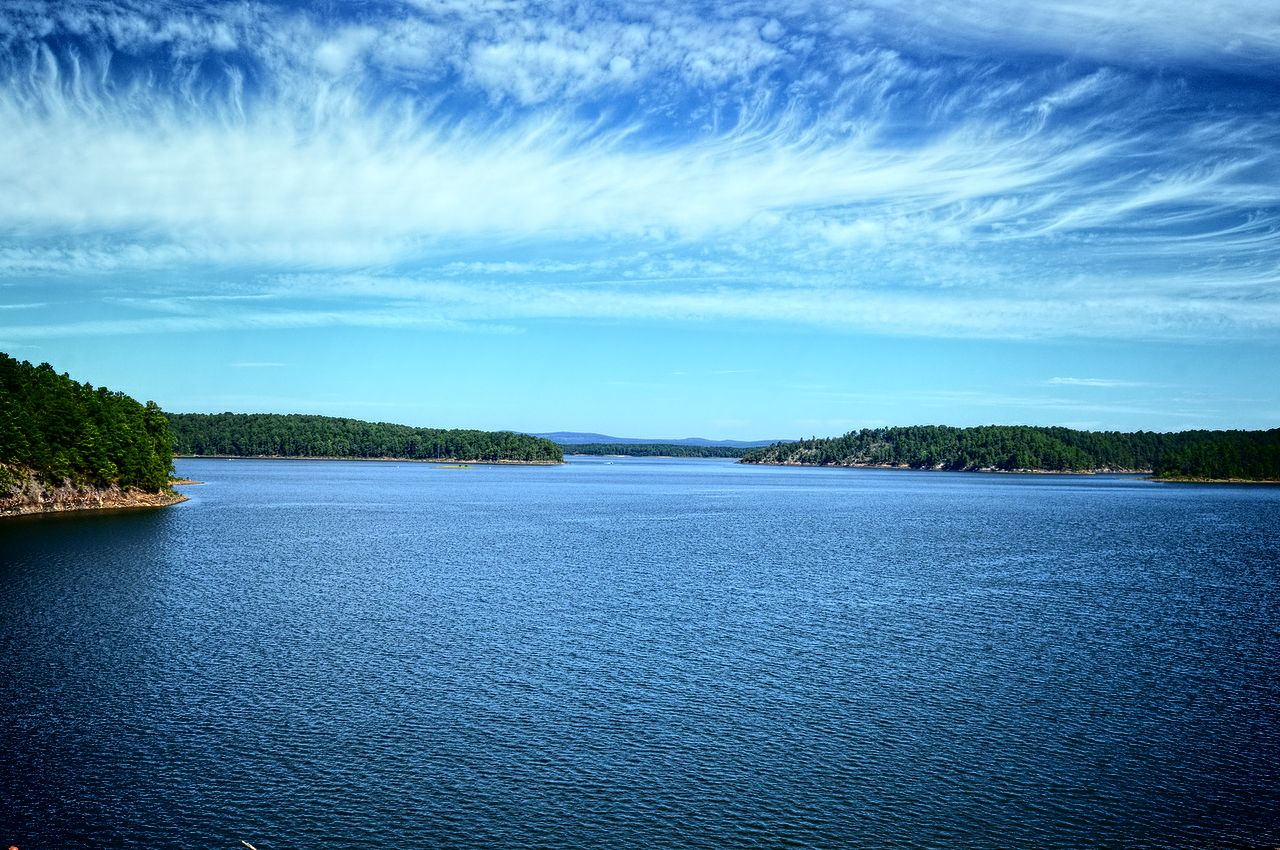
DeGray Lake Resort State Park

DeGray Lake Resort State Park is a 984-acre (398-hectare) in southwest Hot Spring County, and Arkansas's only resort state park. The 94-room DeGray Lodge and Convention Center includes a restaurant and 18-hole championship rated golf course. Traditional state park amenities for camping, hiking, fishing, boating, picnic tables, and horseback riding are also offered. The park is owned and operated by the Arkansas Department of Parks and Tourism (ADPT). DeGray Lake WMA essentially bounds the portions of lake shoreline not bounded by the state park. The land is owned by the United States Army Corps of Engineers (USACE) and extends into Clark County.

Near Malvern, Lake Catherine State Park is a small state park on the west side of Lake Catherine. The park offers 20 cabins, including five Civilian Conservation Corps cabins of natural wood and stone built in the 1930s, and 70 campsites. In summer, the parks offers a marina, boat rental, visitor center, guided tours, nature center and horseback trail rides.

== Demographics ==
From 2000 to 2010, Hot Spring County saw significant population and income growth. The population increased from 30,353 to 32,923, a gain of 8.5%, with incomes rising and poverty declining for almost every demographic.

Historical population
Census	Pop.	Note	%±
1830	458		—
1840	1,907		316.4%
1850	3,609		89.3%
1860	5,635		56.1%
1870	5,877		4.3%
1880	7,775		32.3%
1890	11,603		49.2%
1900	12,748		9.9%
1910	15,022		17.8%
1920	17,784		18.4%
1930	18,105		1.8%
1940	18,916		4.5%
1950	22,181		17.3%
1960	21,893		−1.3%
1970	21,963		0.3%
1980	26,819		22.1%
1990	26,115		−2.6%
2000	30,353		16.2%
2010	32,923		8.5%
2020	33,040		0.4%
2025 (est.)	33,451	▲	1.2%
U.S. Decennial Census; 1790–1960 1900–1990; 1990–2000 2010

=== 2020 census ===
As of the 2020 census, the county had a population of 33,040. The median age was 42.1 years. 21.2% of residents were under the age of 18 and 19.4% of residents were 65 years of age or older. For every 100 females there were 110.4 males, and for every 100 females age 18 and over there were 111.2 males age 18 and over.

The racial makeup of the county was 80.3% White, 10.5% Black or African American, 0.6% American Indian and Alaska Native, 0.3% Asian, <0.1% Native Hawaiian and Pacific Islander, 2.0% from some other race, and 6.3% from two or more races. Hispanic or Latino residents of any race comprised 3.8% of the population.

26.8% of residents lived in urban areas, while 73.2% lived in rural areas.

There were 12,473 households in the county, of which 30.2% had children under the age of 18 living in them. Of all households, 48.8% were married-couple households, 18.8% were households with a male householder and no spouse or partner present, and 26.2% were households with a female householder and no spouse or partner present. About 27.6% of all households were made up of individuals and 12.8% had someone living alone who was 65 years of age or older.

There were 14,179 housing units, of which 12.0% were vacant. Among occupied housing units, 74.8% were owner-occupied and 25.2% were renter-occupied. The homeowner vacancy rate was 1.5% and the rental vacancy rate was 7.6%.

=== 2010 census ===
As of the 2010 census, there were 32,923 people, 12,664 households, and 8,969 families residing in the county. The population density was 53.5 people per square mile (20.7 people/km^{2}). There were 14,332 housing units at an average density of 23.3 units per square mile (9.0 units/km^{2}). The racial makeup of the county was 85.6% White, 10.8% Black or African American, 0.5% Native American, 0.3% Asian, >0.1% Pacific Islander, 1.0% from other races, and 1.7% from two or more races. 2.8% of the population were Hispanic or Latino of any race.

There were 12,664 households, out of which 32.0% had children under the age of 18 living with them, 53.6% were married couples living together, 12.3% had a female householder with no husband present, and 29.2% were non-families. 25.2% of all households were made up of individuals, and 10.6% had someone living alone who was 65 years of age or older. The average household size was 2.48 and the average family size was 2.94.

In the county, the population was spread out, with 23.3% under the age of 18, 8.4% from 18 to 24, 24.3% from 25 to 44, 28.3% from 45 to 64, and 15.7% who were 65 years of age or older. The median age was 40.1 years. For every 100 females there were 95.8 males. For every 100 females age 18 and over, there were 102.5 males age 18 and over.

The median income for a household in the county was $37,150, and the median income for a family was $46,090. Males had a median income of $34,111 versus $27,127 for females. The per capita income for the county was $18,248. About 8.2% of families and 12.3% of the population were below the poverty line, including 13.0% of those under age 18 and 8.9% of those age 65 or over.

=== 2000 census ===
As of the 2000 census, there were 30,353 people, 12,004 households, and 8,834 families residing in the county. The population density was 49 people per square mile (19 people/km^{2}). There were 13,384 housing units at an average density of 22 units per square mile (8.5 units/km^{2}). The racial makeup of the county was 87.33% White, 10.26% Black or African American, 0.45% Native American, 0.22% Asian, 0.04% Pacific Islander, 0.44% from other races, and 1.26% from two or more races. 1.27% of the population were Hispanic or Latino of any race.

There were 12,004 households, out of which 31.80% had children under the age of 18 living with them, 59.20% were married couples living together, 10.60% had a female householder with no husband present, and 26.40% were non-families. 23.50% of all households were made up of individuals, and 11.10% had someone living alone who was 65 years of age or older. The average household size was 2.50 and the average family size was 2.94.

In the county, the population was spread out, with 25.10% under the age of 18, 8.20% from 18 to 24, 26.50% from 25 to 44, 24.50% from 45 to 64, and 15.80% who were 65 years of age or older. The median age was 38 years. For every 100 females there were 95.50 males. For every 100 females age 18 and over, there were 93.00 males.

The median income for a household in the county was $31,543, and the median income for a family was $37,077. Males had a median income of $27,800 versus $19,461 for females. The per capita income for the county was $15,216. About 10.30% of families and 14.00% of the population were below the poverty line, including 19.00% of those under age 18 and 14.20% of those age 65 or over.

== Human resources ==
=== Education ===
Educational attainment in Hot Spring County is typical for a rural Arkansas county, with a 2011-2015 American Community Survey study finding 84.8% of Hot Spring County residents over age 25 held a high school degree. This ratio is in line with the state average of 84.8% and slightly below the national average of 86.7%. The county's percentage of residents holding a bachelor's degree or higher is 13.0%, significantly below state and national averages of 21.1% and 29.8%, respectively.

==== Primary and secondary education ====
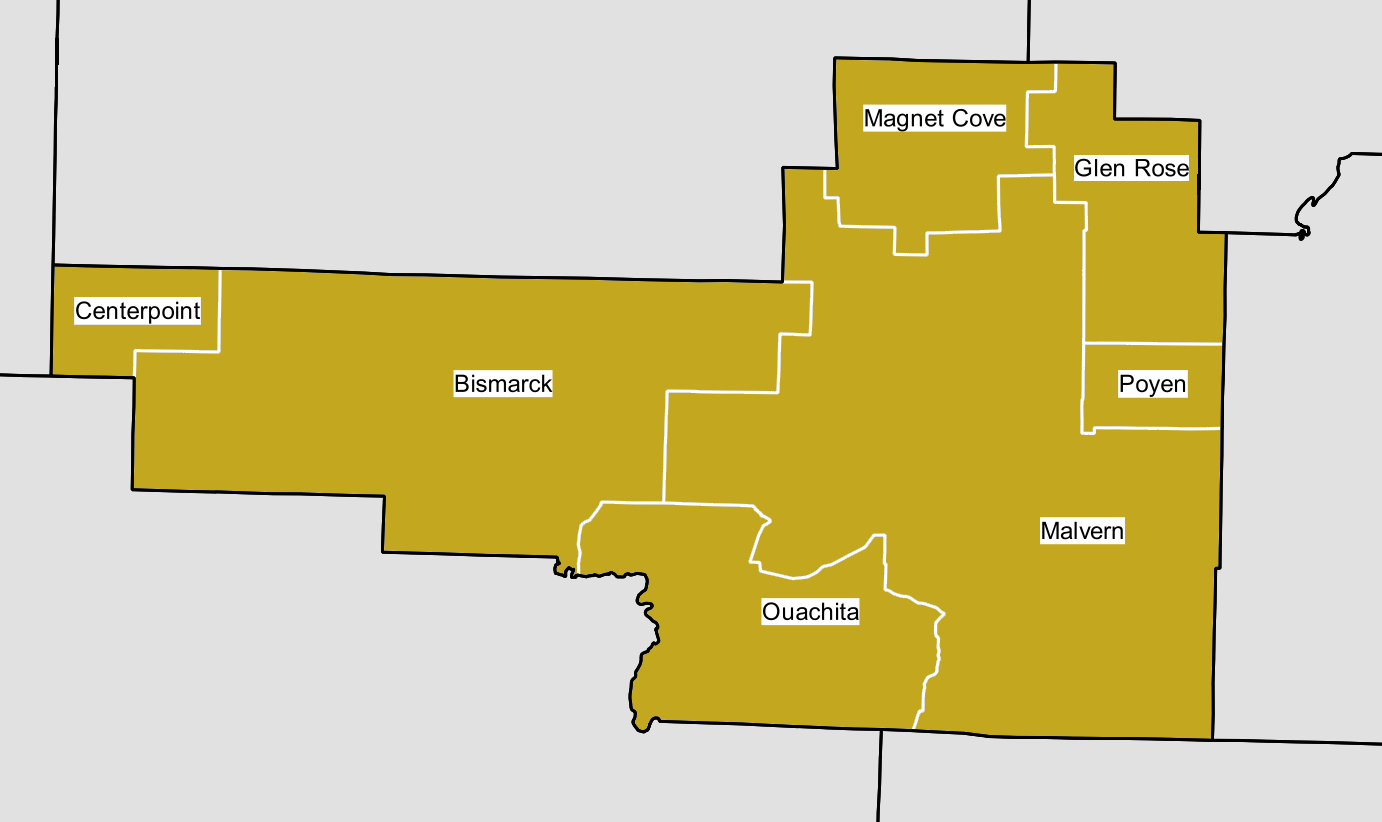
Public school district boundaries in Hot Spring County as of July 2016

Five public school districts are based in Hot Spring County: Malvern School District is the largest school district in Hot Spring County, with the Bismarck School District serving the western portion of the county, Ouachita School District serving a small area around Donaldson, Glen Rose School District serving the northeastern area of the county, and Magnet Cove School District around Magnet Cove. Successful completion of the curriculum of these schools leads to graduation from Malvern High School, Bismarck High School, Ouachita High School, Glen Rose High School, and Magnet Cove High School respectively. All five high schools offer Advanced Placement (AP) courses and are accredited by the Arkansas Department of Education (ADE).

Residents outside the five Hot Spring County-based districts are within either the Centerpoint School District or Poyen School District.

==== Higher education ====
Hot Spring County contains one institution of higher education, ASU Three Rivers, a public community college in Malvern. Other higher education institutions in the region include National Park College, a public two-year college in Hot Springs, and two four-year liberal arts universities in Arkadelphia, Henderson State University and Ouachita Baptist University.

==== Library system ====
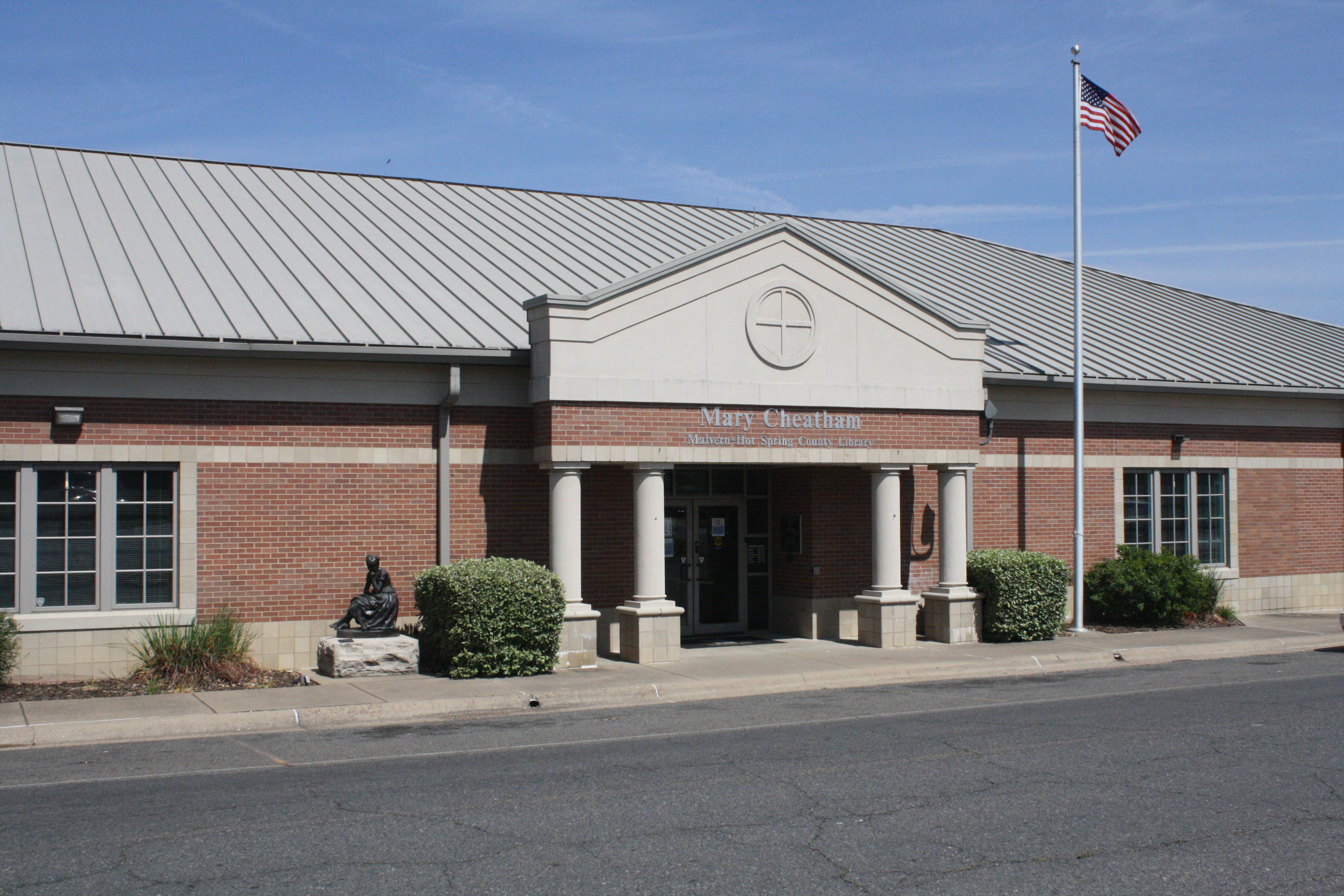
Mary Cheatham Malvern-Hot Spring County Library

The Malvern-Hot Spring County Library at 202 East Third Street in downtown Malvern was founded in 1928 and became a member library of the Mid-Arkansas Regional Library System in 1974. The facility offers books, e-books, media, reference, youth, business and genealogy services.

=== Public safety ===
The Hot Spring County Sheriff's Office is the primary law enforcement agency in the county. The agency is led by the Hot Spring County Sheriff, an official elected by countywide vote every two years.

The county is under the jurisdiction of the Hot Spring County District Court, a state district court. State district courts in Arkansas are courts of original jurisdiction for criminal, civil (up to $25,000), small claims, and traffic matters. State district courts are presided over by a full-time District Judge elected to a four-year term by a districtwide election. Hot Spring County District Court is located at 410 Locust Street in Malvern.

Superseding district court jurisdiction is the 7th Judicial Circuit Court, which covers Hot Spring and Grant counties. The 7th Circuit contains two circuit judges, elected to six-year terms circuitwide. Circuit courts have the right to refer some matters to state district court at their discretion.

Hot Spring County 911 is the local PSAP operating system for the entire county area. Hot Spring County 911 is run by Director Regina Shearin.

== Government ==
The county government is a constitutional body granted specific powers by the Constitution of Arkansas and the Arkansas Code. The quorum court is the legislative branch of the county government and controls all spending and revenue collection. Representatives are called justices of the peace and are elected from county districts every even-numbered year. The number of districts in a county vary from nine to fifteen, and district boundaries are drawn by the county election commission. The Hot Spring County Quorum Court has eleven members. Presiding over quorum court meetings is the county judge, who serves as the chief operating officer of the county. The county judge is elected at-large and does not vote in quorum court business, although capable of vetoing quorum court decisions.

Hot Spring County, Arkansas Elected countywide officials
Position	Officeholder	Party
County Judge	Dennis Thornton	Republican
County Clerk	Patty Griggs	Republican
Circuit Clerk	Teresa Pilcher	Republican
Sheriff	Richard Tolleson	(Unknown)
Treasurer	Glorie Thornton	Republican
Collector	Sheri Oden	Republican
Assessor	Blake Riggan	Republican
Coroner	Jason Chenault	Republican

The composition of the Quorum Court following the 2024 elections is 10 Republicans and 1 Democrat. Justices of the Peace (members) of the Quorum Court following the elections are:

- District 1: James Bryant (D)
- District 2: Brian Coston (R)
- District 3: Ralph V. Williams (R)
- District 4: Darrin Hardy (R)
- District 5: Mike Scarbrough (R)
- District 6: Don Hilyard (R)
- District 7: Jennifer Corley (R) (position now Vacant)
- District 8: Tony Shnaekel (R)
- District 9: Jimmy R. Rogers (R)
- District 10: Wylie Whitley (R)
- District 11: Jay Sheets (R)

Additionally, the townships of Hot Spring County are entitled to elect their own respective constables, as set forth by the Constitution of Arkansas. Constables are largely of historical significance as they were used to keep the peace in rural areas when travel was more difficult. The township constables as of the 2024 elections are:

- Big Creek: Jimmy Finley (R)
- Butterfield: Steve Cook (R)
- Harrison: Martin R. DeVore (R)
- Magnet: Mark Woodfield (R)
- Midway: Scott Whitehead (R)
- Prairie: Ron Brown (R)
- Saline: Waylon Corley (R)

=== Politics ===
Hot Spring County is represented in the Arkansas State Senate by Republican Alan Clark, a Hot Springs businessman. In the Arkansas House of Representatives, it is represented by a Republican as well, Laurie Rushing, a real estate broker from Hot Springs.

Until 2004, Hot Spring County was a typical "Solid South" Democratic county in presidential elections. There were, however, 3 exceptions. Republicans Herbert Hoover and Richard Nixon won the county in 1928 and 1972, respectively, while American Independent candidate George Wallace won the county in 1968. In 2004, Republican candidate George W. Bush won the county by just 59 votes. However, since 2008, the county has given over 60 percent of its vote to the Republican candidate.

United States presidential election results for Hot Spring County, Arkansas
Year	Republican		Democratic		Third party(ies)	
Year	No.	%	No.	%	No.	%
1896	292	17.76%	1,331	80.96%	21	1.28%
1900	423	35.31%	763	63.69%	12	1.00%
1904	537	45.70%	605	51.49%	33	2.81%
1908	686	43.81%	833	53.19%	47	3.00%
1912	248	20.58%	668	55.44%	289	23.98%
1916	645	31.10%	1,429	68.90%	0	0.00%
1920	910	44.96%	1,061	52.42%	53	2.62%
1924	392	29.25%	793	59.18%	155	11.57%
1928	1,126	52.86%	999	46.90%	5	0.23%
1932	237	8.45%	2,542	90.59%	27	0.96%
1936	444	21.84%	1,581	77.77%	8	0.39%
1940	482	21.74%	1,730	78.03%	5	0.23%
1944	853	33.98%	1,646	65.58%	11	0.44%
1948	555	20.08%	1,932	69.90%	277	10.02%
1952	1,842	34.55%	3,474	65.17%	15	0.28%
1956	2,923	44.96%	3,525	54.21%	54	0.83%
1960	1,732	29.59%	3,454	59.00%	668	11.41%
1964	2,911	38.70%	4,543	60.40%	68	0.90%
1968	1,780	22.10%	2,137	26.53%	4,139	51.38%
1972	5,378	64.54%	2,872	34.47%	83	1.00%
1976	2,187	21.88%	7,809	78.12%	0	0.00%
1980	3,561	32.92%	6,897	63.76%	359	3.32%
1984	5,629	48.75%	5,836	50.55%	81	0.70%
1988	4,181	44.46%	5,090	54.12%	134	1.42%
1992	3,036	28.60%	6,308	59.42%	1,272	11.98%
1996	2,864	28.20%	6,002	59.10%	1,289	12.69%
2000	5,042	45.92%	5,527	50.33%	412	3.75%
2004	5,960	49.40%	5,901	48.91%	204	1.69%
2008	7,209	60.30%	4,288	35.87%	458	3.83%
2012	7,097	63.03%	3,830	34.01%	333	2.96%
2016	8,172	68.42%	3,149	26.36%	623	5.22%
2020	9,202	73.28%	3,082	24.54%	273	2.17%
2024	9,226	75.11%	2,818	22.94%	239	1.95%

=== Taxation ===
Property tax is assessed by the Hot Spring County Assessor annually based upon the fair market value of the property and determining which tax rate, commonly called a millage in Arkansas, will apply. The rate depends upon the property's location with respect to city limits, school district, and special tax increment financing (TIF) districts. This tax is collected by the Hot Spring County Collector between the first business day of March of each year through October 15 without penalty. The Hot Spring County Treasurer disburses tax revenues to various government agencies, such as cities, county road departments, fire departments, libraries, and police departments in accordance with the budget set by the quorum court.

Sales and use taxes in Arkansas are voter approved and collected by the Arkansas Department of Finance and Administration. Arkansas's statewide sales and use tax has been 6.5% since July 1, 2013. Hot Spring County has an additional sales and use tax of 1.50%, which has been in effect since January 1, 2009. Within Hot Spring County, the City of Malvern has had an additional 1% sales and use tax since January 1, 2009, City of Rockport an additional 2% since January 1, 2012, and the Town of Perla an additional 1% sales and use tax since January 1, 1984. The Arkansas State Treasurer disburses tax revenue to counties and cities in accordance with tax rules.

== Communities ==
Two incorporated cities, four incorporated towns, and one census designated place (CDP) are located within the county. The largest city and county seat, Malvern, is located in the northeast part of the county on I-30. Malvern's population in 2010 was 10,318, and has been increasing since the 2000 Census. Rockport and Perla are adjacent to Malvern, with populations of 755 and 291 in 2010, respectively. The remaining communities are in the south part of the county near the Ouachita River, each with a population under 400 as of 2010: Donaldson, Friendship and Midway. Magnet Cove is a former town, suspending incorporation in 2006.

Hot Spring County has dozens of unincorporated communities and ghost towns within its borders. This is due to early settlers in Arkansas tending to settle in small clusters rather than incorporated towns. For example, communities like Jones Mill have a post office or a collection of buildings. Other communities are simply a few dwellings at a crossroads that have adopted a common place name over time. Some are officially listed as populated places by the United States Geological Survey, and others are listed as historic settlements.

=== Cities ===
- Malvern (County Seat)
- Rockport

=== Towns ===
- Donaldson
- Friendship
- Midway
- Perla

=== Census Designated Places ===
- Bismarck
- Jones Mill
- Magnet Cove

=== Other unincorporated communities ===
- Abco
- Antioch
- Beaton
- Bonnerdale
- Brown Springs
- Butterfiield
- Caney
- Central
- De Roche
- Diamondhead
- Faber
- Gifford
- Glen Rose
- Harp
- Lambert
- Landers
- Lono
- Morning Star
- Mount Moriah
- Oak Bower
- Oak Grove
- Old De Roche
- Oma
- Point Cedar
- Rolla
- Saginaw
- Shorewood Hills
- Social Hill
- Whittington
- Witherspoon

=== Historical communities ===
- Cove Creek
- Duffie
- Durian
- Elmore
- Etta
- Fleming
- Sanders
- Twin Oak
- Walco
- Wayside
- Wyandotte

== Townships ==
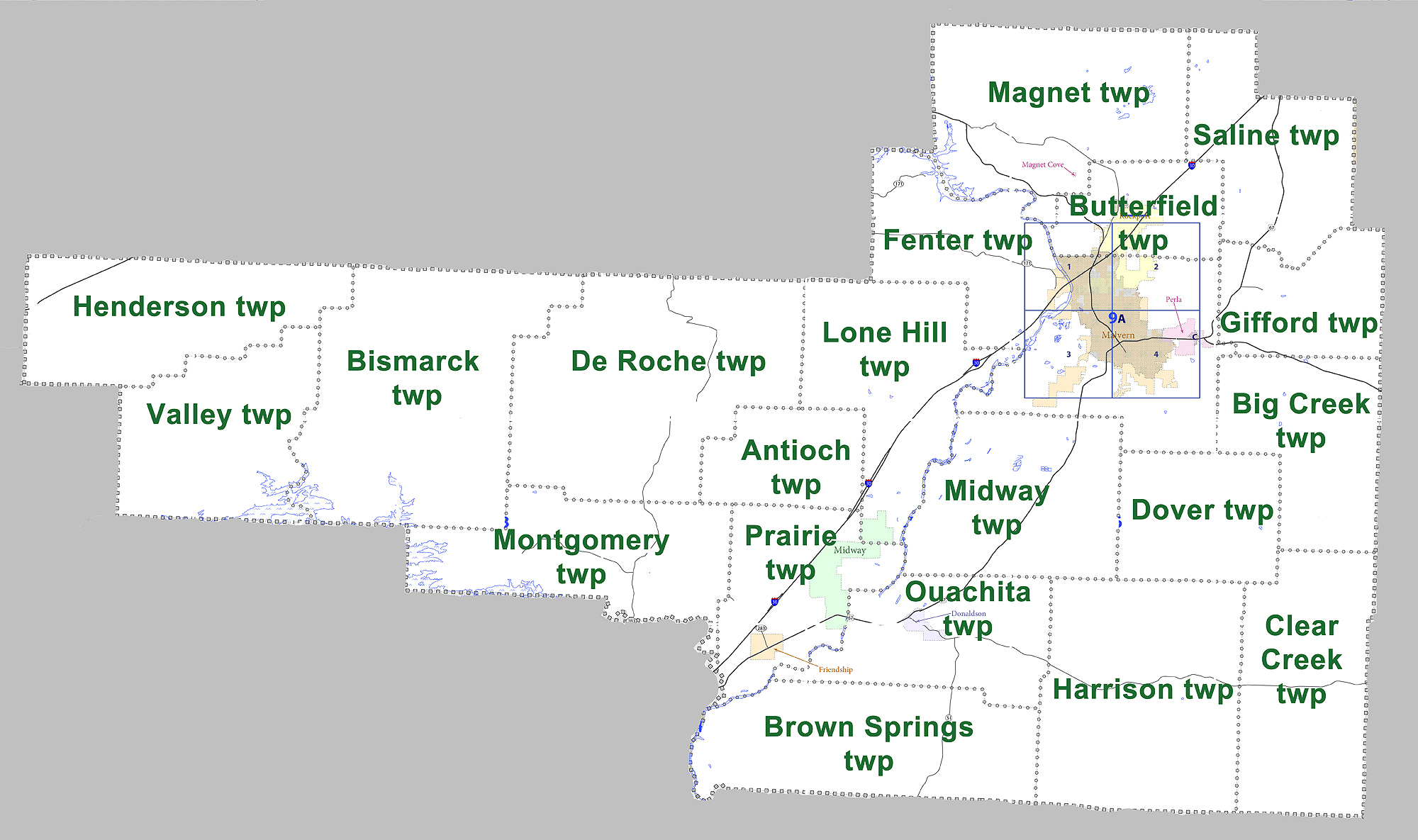
Townships in Hot Spring County, Arkansas as of 2010

Townships in Arkansas are the divisions of a county. Each township includes unincorporated areas; some may have incorporated cities or towns within part of their boundaries. Arkansas townships have limited purposes in modern times. However, the United States census does list Arkansas population based on townships (sometimes referred to as "county subdivisions" or "minor civil divisions"). Townships are also of value for historical purposes in terms of genealogical research. Each town or city is within one or more townships in an Arkansas county based on census maps and publications. The townships of Hot Spring County are listed below; listed in parentheses are the cities, towns, and/or census-designated places that are fully or partially inside the township.

- Antioch
- Big Creek
- Bismarck
- Brown Springs
- Butterfield (part of Rockport and Malvern)
- Clear Creek
- De Roche
- Dover
- Fenter (Perla, most of Malvern, part of Rockport)
- Gifford
- Harrison
- Henderson
- Lone Hill (part of Midway)
- Magnet (Magnet Cove)
- Midway
- Montgomery
- Ouachita (Donaldson)
- Prairie (Friendship, most of Midway)
- Saline
- Valley

== Infrastructure ==
=== Aviation ===
Hot Spring County contains one public owned/public use general aviation airport, Malvern Municipal Airport southeast of Malvern. For the twelve-month period ending July 31, 2015, the facility saw 11,850 general aviation operations and 150 military operations. The nearest commercial service airport is Clinton National Airport in Little Rock.

=== Major highways ===
- Interstate 30
- U.S. Highway 67
- U.S. Highway 70
- U.S. Highway 270
- Highway 7
- Highway 9
- Highway 51
- Highway 84
- Highway 128
- Highway 171
- Highway 222
- Highway 283
- Highway 347

== See also ==
- List of counties in Arkansas
- List of lakes of Hot Spring County, Arkansas
- National Register of Historic Places listings in Hot Spring County, Arkansas

== Cited works ==
- Staff of the Arkansas Judiciary (December 14, 2016). "Arkansas Judicial Directory" (PDF). Little Rock: Arkansas Judiciary. Archived from the original (PDF) on December 4, 2015.
