= Glen Rose School District =

School district in Arkansas

Location
- 14334 U.S. Highway 67; Malvern, Arkansas postal address, 72104 United States
- Coordinates: 34°27′18″N 92°43′49″W

District information
- Grades: PK–12
- Superintendent: Chad Jordan
- Schools: 3
- NCES District ID: 0506630

Students and staff
- Students: 973
- Faculty: 71.86 (on FTE basis)
- Staff: 148.86 (on FTE basis)
- Student–teacher ratio: 15.86
- District mascot: Beaver
- Colors: Red; White

Other information
- Website: www.grbeavers.org

Glen Rose School District is a public school district based in Glen Rose, Arkansas, United States, with a Malvern postal address. The school district supports more than 950 students in prekindergarten through grade 12 and employs more than 145 faculty and staff on a full time equivalent basis. The school district encompasses 75.45 square miles (195.4 km^{2}) of land, in Saline County and in Hot Spring County. In the former it includes the community of Traskwood.

== Schools ==
Each of the schools are accredited by the Arkansas Department of Education (ADE) and the elementary and high schools are accredited by AdvancED.

- Glen Rose High School, serving more than 300 students in grades 9 through 12.
- Glen Rose Middle School, serving more than 300 students in grades 5 through 8.
- Glen Rose Elementary School, serving more than 350 students in prekindergarten through grade 4.
