= Malvern School District =

School district in Arkansas, United States

Address
- 1517 South Main Street Malvern, Arkansas, 72104; United States

District information
- Type: Public
- Grades: PreK–12
- NCES District ID: 0509240

Students and staff
- Students: 1,958
- Teachers: 167.84
- Staff: 160.38
- Student–teacher ratio: 11.67

Other information
- Website: www.malvernleopards.org

Malvern School District, also known as Malvern Special School District (MSSD), is a school district based in Malvern, Arkansas, United States. The district serves more than 2,100 students in childhood, elementary, and secondary education in kindergarten through grade 12.

Malvern School District encompasses 456.09 square miles (1,181.3 km^{2}) of land, in Hot Spring, Cleveland, and Dallas counties.

Within Hot Spring County it serves Malvern, Perla, almost all of Rockport, and a portion of Midway. Within Dallas County it serves Carthage.

== History ==
In May 2004, the former Carthage School District was consolidated with the Malvern School District.

== Schools ==
Elementary education:

- Malvern Elementary School, serving kindergarten through grade 4.
- Wilson Intermediate School, serving grades 5 and 6.

Secondary education:

- Malvern Middle School, serving grades 7 and 8.
- Malvern High School, serving grades 9 through 12.
