= Magnet Cove, Arkansas =

- Census-designated place
- Location within Arkansas Location within the United States
- Coordinates: 34°26′57″N 92°50′15″W
- Country: United States
- State: Arkansas
- County: Hot Spring

Area
  - Total: 2.11 sq mi (5.47 km^{2})
  - Land: 2.11 sq mi (5.47 km^{2})
  - Water: 0.0039 sq mi (0.01 km^{2})
- Elevation: 476 ft (145 m)

Population (2020)
  - Total: 692
  - Density: 328/sq mi (126.6/km^{2})
- Time zone: UTC-6 (Central (CST))
  - Summer (DST): UTC-5 (CDT)
- ZIP code: 72104
- Area code: 501
- FIPS code: 05-43430
- GNIS feature ID: 2747298

Magnet Cove is a census-designated place (CDP) and former town in Hot Spring County, Arkansas, United States. It is located in the Ouachita Mountains southeast of Hot Springs, on Arkansas Highway 51 north of U.S. Highway 270. As of the 2020 census, the town of Magnet Cove had a population of 692.

== Geography ==
The boundaries of the former town, with a population of 2, represented only a very small portion of the overall Magnet Cove community. The community suspended its incorporation in 2006. As of 2015, the U.S. Census Bureau recognized an area along Highway 51 extending from Harver Hills Road in the southeast to Gourdneck Valley Road in the northwest as the Magnet Cove Census Designated Place. The CDP occupies the topographic Magnet Cove, a narrow valley along Stone Quarry Creek surrounded by hills, and includes the Magnet Cove High School and Elementary School, as well as Magnet Cove United Methodist Church.

== Geology ==
The Magnet Cove igneous complex lies to the west of the town. The area is known for its abundance of odd minerals, including magnetite usually in the form of lodestone, as well as many other mineral species such as rutile, anatase, brookite, perovskite, and some rare-earth-bearing minerals.

== Demographics ==
Historical population
Census	Pop.	Note	%±
2000	467		—
2010	411		−12.0%
2020	692		68.4%
U.S. Decennial Census; 2010 2020

=== 2020 census ===
Magnet Cove CDP, Arkansas – Racial and ethnic composition Note: the US Census treats Hispanic/Latino as an ethnic category. This table excludes Latinos from the racial categories and assigns them to a separate category. Hispanics/Latinos may be of any race.
Race / Ethnicity (NH = Non-Hispanic)	Pop 2010	Pop 2020	% 2010	% 2020
White alone (NH)	361	640	87.83%	92.49%
Black or African American alone (NH)	5	0	1.22%	0.00%
Native American or Alaska Native alone (NH)	1	0	0.24%	0.00%
Asian alone (NH)	0	0	0.00%	0.00%
Pacific Islander alone (NH)	0	0	0.00%	0.00%
Some Other Race alone (NH)	0	0	0.00%	0.00%
Mixed Race or Multi-Racial (NH)	33	47	8.03%	6.79%
Hispanic or Latino (any race)	11	5	2.68%	0.72%
Total	411	692	100.00%	100.00%

== Education ==
It is in the Magnet Cove School District.

== See Also ==
- Minerals
- Perovskite nanocrystals
