= Rockport, Arkansas =

- City
- Location in Hot Spring County and Arkansas

- Location in the United States
- Coordinates: 34°24′25″N 92°48′28″W
- Country: United States
- State: Arkansas
- County: Hot Spring
- Townships: Butterfield, Fenter
- Founded: August 31, 1837
- Incorporated: January 2, 1851

Government
  - Type: Mayor–Council
  - Mayor: Darrell Hughes (I)
  - Council: Rockport City Council

Area
  - Total: 3.15 sq mi (8.17 km^{2})
  - Land: 3.15 sq mi (8.17 km^{2})
  - Water: 0 sq mi (0.00 km^{2})
- Elevation: 348 ft (106 m)

Population (2020)
  - Total: 676
  - Estimate (2025): 709 ▲
  - Density: 214.3/sq mi (82.73/km^{2})
- Time zone: UTC−06:00 (CST)
  - Summer (DST): UTC−05:00 (CDT)
- ZIP code: 72104
- Area code: 501
- FIPS code: 05-60020
- GNIS feature ID: 2404640
- Highways: Interstate 30; U.S. Highway 270; Highway 51
- Major airport: LIT
- Website: rockportar.org

Rockport is a city in Hot Spring County in the U.S. state of Arkansas. As of the 2020 census, Rockport had a population of 676.

== History ==
Rockport is one of the oldest named places in Arkansas. Although the present city is overshadowed by Malvern, Rockport served as the county seat of Hot Spring County from 1846 to 1879 and was a landmark community of Arkansas for many years both before and after that time.

=== European exploration and settlement through early statehood ===
Large novaculite boulders in the bed of the Ouachita River made the location of Rockport ideal as both a river crossing and a resting place for weary river travelers. These boulders gave the community its name. A plaque in Rockport states that Spanish explorer Hernando de Soto visited the location in 1541, although current historians are less certain about the exact route that de Soto and his group traveled while west of the Mississippi River. French hunters and trappers definitely forded the river at this location. The Hunter-Dunbar Expedition struggled to navigate the rapids here on December 3, 1804, recording their experience in a travel diary. During the 1830s, the development of the Military Road (also called the Southwest Trail) used the boulders as a ford to cross the river. Around 1847, a bridge was completed across the Ouachita River at Rockport, which is said to be the first toll bridge built in Arkansas. Over the years, it repeatedly washed away and was rebuilt.

By that time, the settlement was already populated. Its most famous citizen was politician Lorenzo Gibson, who built a house on a bluff overlooking the river and who became, in 1837, Rockport's first postmaster. Other early settlers were Colonel A. R. Givens, Henry Miller, and Samuel Emerson, who is credited with laying out the city and opening its first hotel. Three doctors and a lawyer also made their homes in Rockport while Arkansas was still a territory. Hot Spring County was formed in 1829, with its county seat at Hot Springs (Garland County), but the seat of county government was moved to Rockport in 1846. At that time, the city already had a gristmill, a shop where wagons were built, stores, and residences. A Methodist church was meeting in a private home as early as 1815; its first building, a log structure, was erected in 1836. Rockport Baptist Church began holding services in 1849 and also housed Rockport's first school. New Hope Baptist Church was established in 1859.

=== American Civil War through the Gilded Age ===
A new county courthouse was dedicated in 1860, just a few months before the outbreak of the Civil War. The Hot Spring County Hornets were the first of several military units to form in Rockport. A skirmish was fought at Rockport on March 25, 1864. Federal forces under General Frederick Steele camped near the nearly abandoned city, building a pontoon bridge to cross the river on the following day.

Following the war, the Cairo and Fulton Railroad offered to build tracks through the area with a depot in Rockport, but their offer was declined by city leaders. As a result, the tracks were located farther south, and the city of Malvern was established. That same year, 1873, a major fire devastated Rockport, destroying the county courthouse among other structures. Also that year, Garland County was created, greatly reducing the size and population of Hot Spring County. As a result of all three events, county leaders decided to build a new courthouse in Malvern, and the county government was moved there in 1879. The population of Rockport began to decline. The Ouachita Falls Lumber Company was a major employer in Rockport at the time, but lumber companies and brick factories in Malvern increasingly drew jobs to the newer city.

=== Early twentieth century through the modern era ===
After several false starts due to financial difficulties, developers managed to complete a plan to build an iron bridge across the Ouachita River to replace the older wooden bridge that had been washed away. The structure itself was begun on August 10, 1900, and completed on November 6 of the same year, with a dedication ceremony and community meal on November 8. The bridge was put on the National Register of Historic Places in 1992, only to be removed after it was damaged by storms and flooding in 1987 and 1990. The last vestiges of the wreckage were salvaged from the Ouachita River in 2004.

During the Arkansas Centennial Celebration in June 1936, President Franklin Roosevelt visited the State of Arkansas. After morning events in Hot Springs and lunch with businessman Harvey Couch, the president and his party attended a service at the Methodist church in Rockport, which was followed by a parade. After the parade, the group traveled to Little Rock for additional festive observances.

== Geography ==
Rockport is located in northeastern Hot Spring County and is bordered to the south by the city of Malvern, the county seat. Interstate 30 passes through Rockport, with access from Exit 98 (U.S. Route 270 east). According to the United States Census Bureau, Rockport has a total area of 3.4 square miles (8.8 km^{2}), all land.

== Demographics ==
Historical population
Census	Pop.	Note	%±
1960	162		—
1970	158		−2.5%
1980	231		46.2%
1990	388		68.0%
2000	792		104.1%
2010	755		−4.7%
2020	676		−10.5%
2025 (est.)	709	▲	4.9%
U.S. Decennial Census

=== 2020 census ===
Rockport racial composition
Race	Number	Percentage
White (non-Hispanic)	580	85.8%
Black or African American (non-Hispanic)	25	3.7%
Native American	2	0.3%
Asian	2	0.3%
Other/Mixed	61	9.02%
Hispanic or Latino	6	0.89%

As of the 2020 United States census, there were 676 people, 303 households, and 235 families residing in the city.

=== 2000 census ===
As of the census of 2000, there were 792 people, 324 households, and 238 families residing in the city. The population density was 97.4/km^{2} (252/mi^{2}). There were 348 housing units at an average density of 42.8/km^{2} (111/mi^{2}). The racial makeup of the city was 94.44% White, 2.40% Black or African American, 1.26% Native American, 0.63% Asian, 0.13% Pacific Islander, and 1.14% from two or more races. 0.63% of the population were Hispanic or Latino ethnicity of any race.

There were 324 households, out of which 24.4% had children under the age of 18 living with them, 62.7% were married couples living together, 5.2% had a female householder with no husband present, and 26.5% were non-families. 24.1% of all households were made up of individuals, and 9.9% had someone living alone who was 65 years of age or older. Average household size was 2.44 and the average family size was 2.86.

In the city, the population was spread out, with 22.2% under the age of 18, 6.7% from 18 to 24, 23.5% from 25 to 44, 29.5% from 45 to 64, and 18.1% who were 65 years of age or older. The median age was 44 years. For every 100 females, there were 96.5 males. For every 100 females age 18 and over, there were 97.4 males.

The median income for a household in the city was $35,250, and the median income for a family was $40,750. Males had a median income of $26,875 versus $21,146 for females. The per capita income for the city was $15,299. About 2.5% of families and 5.2% of the population were below the poverty line, including 3.1% of those under age 18 and 9.0% of those age 65 or over.

== Education ==
Almost all of Rockport is served by the Malvern School District, while a small portion is in the Magnet Cove School District.

== See also ==
- List of cities and towns in Arkansas
- National Register of Historic Places listings in Hot Spring County, Arkansas
