= Bismarck, Arkansas =

- Township
- Location within Arkansas Location within the United States
- Coordinates: 34°19′04″N 93°10′41″W
- Country: United States
- State: Arkansas
- County: Hot Spring
- Elevation: 568 ft (173 m)

Population (2020)
  - Total: 229
- Time zone: UTC-6 (Central (CST))
  - Summer (DST): UTC-5 (CDT)
- ZIP code: 71929
- GNIS feature ID: 2805624

Bismarck is a rural unincorporated community and census-designated place (CDP) in Hot Spring County, Arkansas. It was first listed as a CDP in the 2020 census with a population of 229. It is located between Hot Springs and Caddo Valley, centered around the intersection of State Hwy 7 and State Hwy 84 in Hot Spring County, Arkansas, United States.

== Demographics ==
Historical population
Census	Pop.	Note	%±
2020	229		—
U.S. Decennial Census; 2020

=== 2020 census ===
Bismarck CDP, Arkansas – Racial and ethnic composition Note: the US Census treats Hispanic/Latino as an ethnic category. This table excludes Latinos from the racial categories and assigns them to a separate category. Hispanics/Latinos may be of any race.
Race / Ethnicity (NH = Non-Hispanic)	Pop 2020	% 2020
White alone (NH)	184	80.35%
Black or African American alone (NH)	1	0.44%
Native American or Alaska Native alone (NH)	4	1.75%
Asian alone (NH)	0	0.00%
Pacific Islander alone (NH)	0	0.00%
Some Other Race alone (NH)	0	0.00%
Mixed Race or Multi-Racial (NH)	16	6.99%
Hispanic or Latino (any race)	24	10.48%
Total	229	100.00%

== Education ==
Public education is provided by the Bismarck School District, which provides elementary and secondary education.
