= Friendship, Arkansas =

- Town
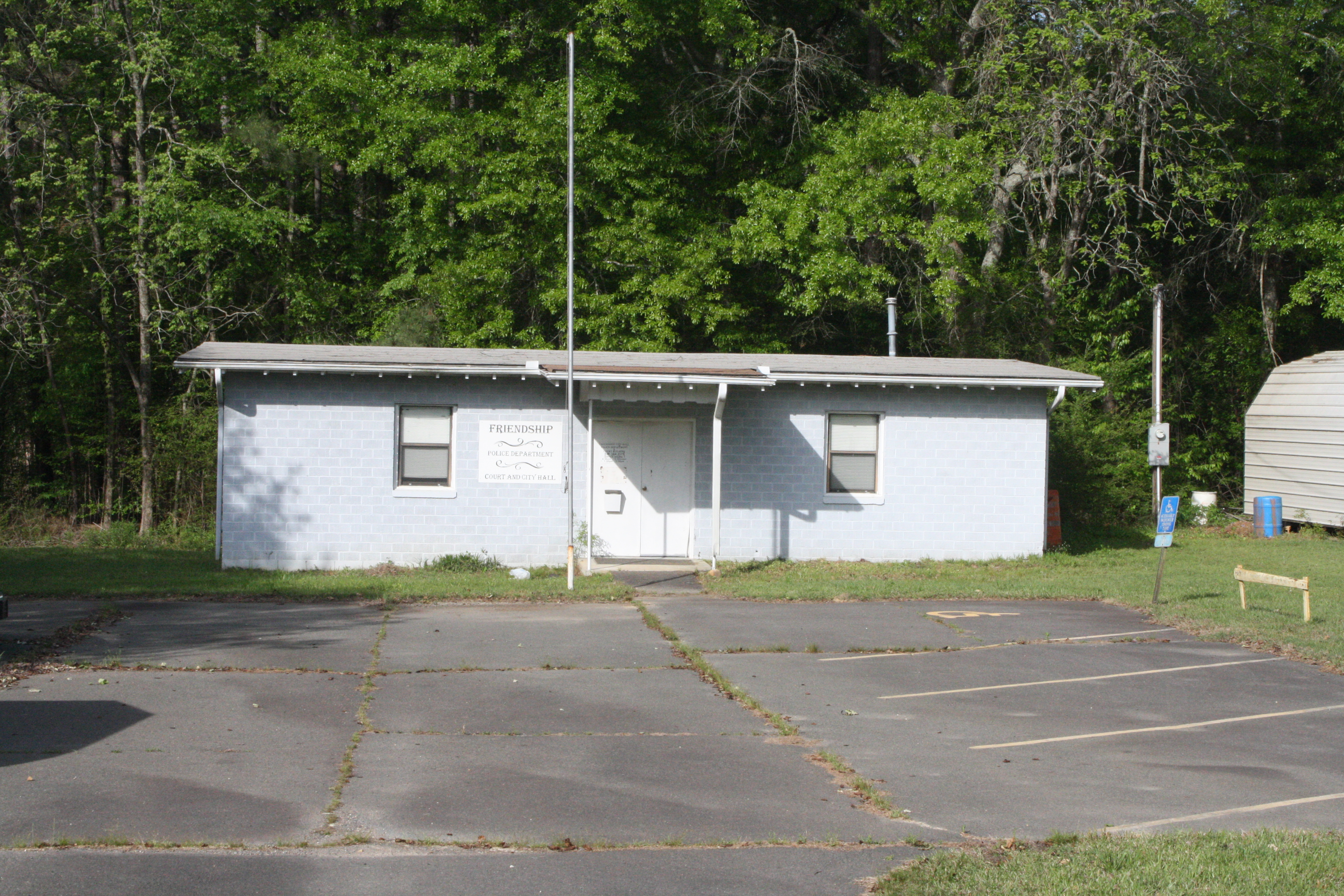
- City Hall

- Location of Friendship in Hot Spring County, Arkansas.
- Coordinates: 34°13′29″N 93°00′05″W
- Country: United States
- State: Arkansas
- County: Hot Spring

Area
  - Total: 0.71 sq mi (1.84 km^{2})
  - Land: 0.71 sq mi (1.84 km^{2})
  - Water: 0 sq mi (0.00 km^{2})
- Elevation: 312 ft (95 m)

Population (2020)
  - Total: 158
  - Estimate (2025): 167 ▲
  - Density: 221.9/sq mi (85.68/km^{2})
- Time zone: UTC-6 (Central (CST))
  - Summer (DST): UTC-5 (CDT)
- ZIP code: 71942
- Area code: 501
- FIPS code: 05-25180
- GNIS feature ID: 2406527

Friendship is a town in Hot Spring County, Arkansas, United States. As of the 2020 census, Friendship had a population of 158.

== Geography ==
Friendship is located in southern Hot Spring County on high ground half a mile (0.8 km) north of the Ouachita River. U.S. Route 67 passes through the center of town, leading northeast 16 miles (26 km) to Malvern, the county seat, and southwest 10 miles (16 km) to Arkadelphia. Interstate 30 passes just northwest of the town limits, with access from Exit 83. I-30 leads northeast 60 miles (97 km) to Little Rock and southwest 85 miles (137 km) to Texarkana.

According to the United States Census Bureau, the town of Friendship has a total area of 0.73 square miles (1.9 km^{2}), all land.

== Demographics ==
Historical population
Census	Pop.	Note	%±
1940	272		—
1950	179		−34.2%
1960	162		−9.5%
1970	150		−7.4%
1980	163		8.7%
1990	160		−1.8%
2000	206		28.8%
2010	176		−14.6%
2020	158		−10.2%
2025 (est.)	167	▲	5.7%
U.S. Decennial Census; 2014 Estimate

As of the census of 2000, there were 206 people, 79 households, and 57 families residing in the town. The population density was 280.4 inhabitants per square mile (108.3/km^{2}). There were 83 housing units at an average density of 113.0 per square mile (43.6/km^{2}). The racial makeup of the town was 99.51% White, 0.49% from other races. 1.46% of the population were Hispanic or Latino of any race.

There were 79 households, out of which 32.9% had children under the age of 18 living with them, 64.6% were married couples living together, 6.3% had a female householder with no husband present, and 26.6% were non-families. 22.8% of all households were made up of individuals, and 11.4% had someone living alone who was 65 years of age or older. The average household size was 2.61 and the average family size was 3.03.

In the town, the population was spread out, with 26.2% under the age of 18, 3.9% from 18 to 24, 30.1% from 25 to 44, 21.8% from 45 to 64, and 18.0% who were 65 years of age or older. The median age was 37 years. For every 100 females, there were 90.7 males. For every 100 females age 18 and over, there were 90.0 males.

The median income for a household in the town was $39,792, and the median income for a family was $45,000. Males had a median income of $32,031 versus $15,625 for females. The per capita income for the town was $14,865. About 11.8% of families and 13.9% of the population were below the poverty line, including 17.8% of those under the age of eighteen and 7.5% of those 65 or over.

== Education ==
It is in the Ouachita School District. Its comprehensive high school is Ouachita High School.
