= Glen Rose, Arkansas =

- Unincorporated community
- Location within Arkansas Location within the United States
- Coordinates: 34°27′20″N 92°43′47″W
- Country: United States
- State: Arkansas
- County: Hot Spring
- Elevation: 328 ft (100 m)
- Time zone: UTC-6 (Central (CST))
  - Summer (DST): UTC-5 (CDT)
- GNIS feature ID: 0049440

Glen Rose is a community in northeastern Hot Spring County, Arkansas.

The community is located seven miles northeast of Malvern and ten miles southwest of Benton on U.S. Route 67. Interstate 30 passes one mile northwest of the community. Ninemile Creek and Tenmile Creek pass to the west and east sides of the community.

The community acquired its name from a school in the area. The name was given either as Glen for the location in a valley and Rose for the roses found on the school grounds or it was named for University of Arkansas coach Glen Rose.

== See also ==
- Glen Rose School District
