= Glen Rose High School (Arkansas) =

Location
- 14334 Hwy 67; Malvern postal address, Arkansas 72104; United States; 34°27′18″N 92°43′49″W

Information
- Status: Open
- School district: Glen Rose School District
- NCES District ID: 0506630
- Authority: Arkansas Department of Education (ADE)
- CEEB code: 041527
- NCES School ID: 050663000398
- Principal: Joe Lewallen
- Teaching staff: 57.33 (on FTE basis)
- Grades: 9–12
- Enrollment: 301 (2023–2024)
- Student to teacher ratio: 5.25
- Education system: ADE Smart Core curriculum
- Colors: Red and white
- Athletics conference: 5A West (2012–14)
- Mascot: Beaver
- Team name: Glen Rose Beavers
- Feeder schools: Glen Rose Middle School
- Affiliation: Arkansas Activities Association
- Website: www.grbeavers.org/260557_3

Glen Rose High School (GRHS) is an accredited comprehensive public high school serving more than 300 students in grades nine through twelve in Glen Rose, Arkansas, United States, with a Malvern postal address. It is one of three high schools with Malvern post office addresses, one of five public high schools in Hot Spring County and the sole high school administered by the Glen Rose School District.

== Academics ==
Glen Rose High School has been accredited by the Arkansas Department of Education (ADE) and has been accredited by AdvancED (formerly North Central Association) since 1986. The assumed course of study follows the Smart Core curriculum developed the ADE, which requires students to complete 22 credit units before graduation. Students engage in regular (core and career focus) courses and exams and may select Advanced Placement (AP) coursework and exams that provide an opportunity for college credit.

== Athletics ==
The Glen Rose High School mascot is the Beaver with school colors of red and white.

For 2012–14, the Glen Rose Beavers participate in various interscholastic activities in the 3A Classification from the 3A Region 5 Conference as administered by the Arkansas Activities Association. The school athletic activities include football, basketball (boys/girls), golf (boys/girls), competitive cheer, competitive dance, archery, baseball, softball and track and field (boys/girls).

The competitive dance team has won three consecutive state (3A-2A-1A classifications) dance championships in 2011, 2012 and 2013.

The Glen Rose High School football team won the 3A State Championship in 2007, under head coach Billy Elmore.
