= Culbertson Kiln =

Archaeological site in Arkansas, United States

- U.S. National Register of Historic Places
- Location within Arkansas Location within the United States
- Nearest city: Princeton, Arkansas
- Coordinates: 34°0′41″N 92°35′10″W
- Area: 1 acre (0.40 ha)
- Built by: Culbertson, Nathaniel
- NRHP reference No.: 75000382
- Added to NRHP: May 29, 1975

The Culbertson Kiln is a historic pottery site in rural Dallas County, Arkansas. It is located east of Princeton off Stark Bland Road, and was the site of a kiln which was operated from 1858 to 1865. The works were believed to be set up by Nathaniel Culbertson, who had worked at the pottery of Thomas Welch. The objects produced by Culbertson appear to have varied in style and texture from those produced by Welch and his predecessors, the Bird brothers, despite using the same sources of clay.

The site was listed on the National Register of Historic Places in 1975.

== See also ==
- National Register of Historic Places listings in Dallas County, Arkansas
