= Mt. Carmel Methodist Church =

Historic church in Arkansas, United States

- U.S. National Register of Historic Places
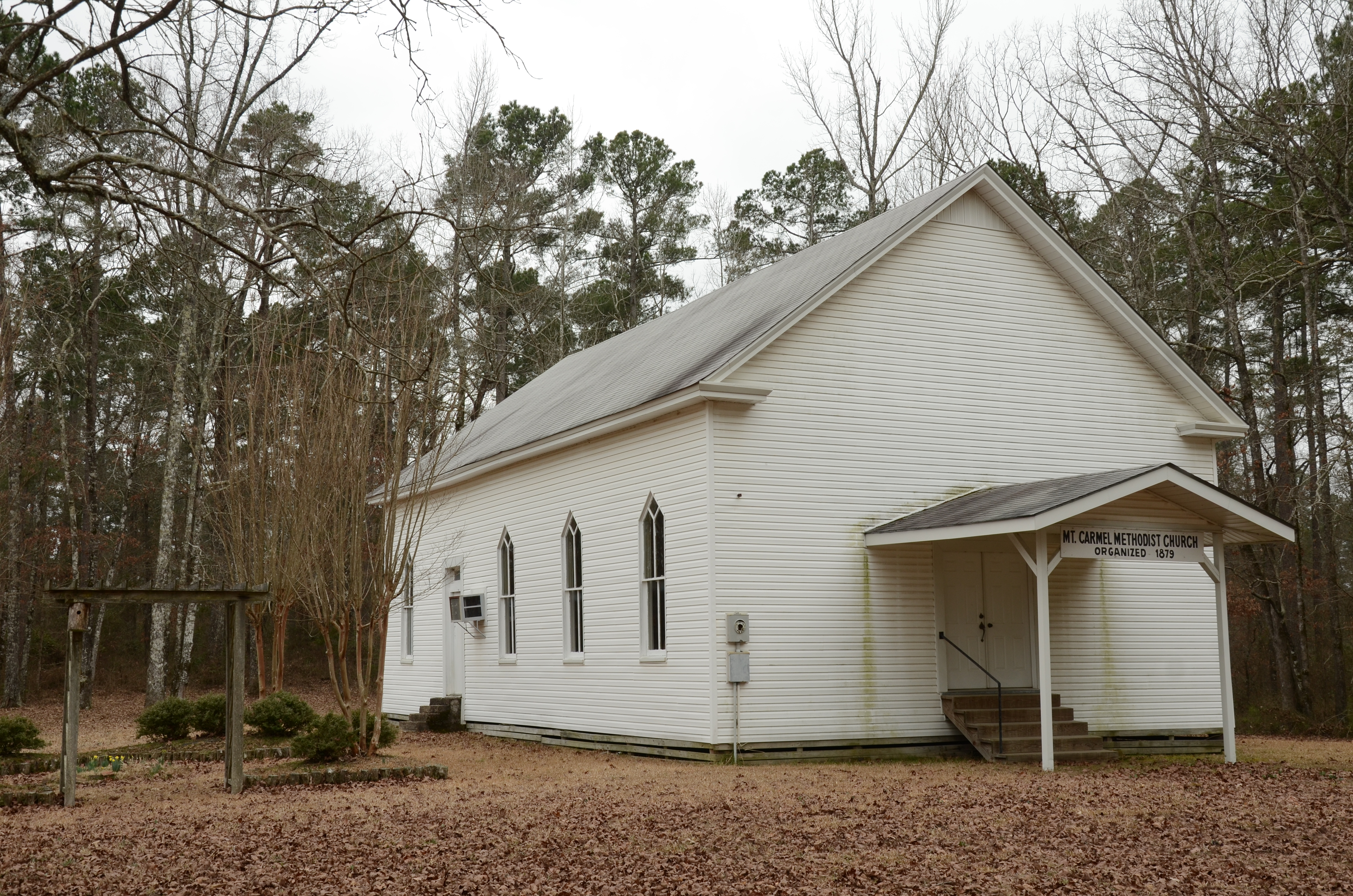

- Location within Arkansas Location within the United States
- Location: AR 9, Jacinto, Arkansas
- Coordinates: 33°54′13″N 92°38′15″W
- Area: less than one acre
- Built: 1900
- Architectural style: Greek Revival
- MPS: Dallas County MRA
- NRHP reference No.: 83003528
- Added to NRHP: October 28, 1983

Mt. Carmel Methodist Church is a historic church in rural Dallas County, Arkansas, near the hamlet of Jacinto. It is located northwest of the county seat Fordyce, on County Road 113 just east of Arkansas Highway 9. It is set in a clearing near several other small frame churches. It is also a frame structure, built c. 1900, that is set apart from other rural churches in the county by its use of Gothic Revival pointed-arch windows. These windows are topped by slightly projecting triangular hoods, heightening the prominence of the Gothic points and relieving the otherwise plain side facades.

The building was listed on the National Register of Historic Places in 1983.

== See also ==
- National Register of Historic Places listings in Dallas County, Arkansas
