= Fielder House =

Historic house in Arkansas, United States

- U.S. National Register of Historic Places
- Location within Arkansas Location within the United States
- Location: US 79B, Fordyce, Arkansas
- Coordinates: 33°48′45″N 92°25′47″W
- Area: less than one acre
- Built: 1875
- MPS: Dallas County MRA
- NRHP reference No.: 83003467
- Added to NRHP: October 28, 1983

The Fielder House is a historic house in Fordyce, Arkansas. Its oldest portion built in 1875, it is the oldest building in Dallas County, predating Fordyce's founding. It stands on the south side of US 79B in the west side of the city, and looks today like a single-story central-hall gable-roof structure with a rear shed addition, and a shed-roof porch extending across the front. The core of the house is a log structure, which is now the west side of the building. In the 1880s the eastern pen was added, creating a dog trot structure, which was then filled in and enclosed by later additions. The house is also notable for being the home of the aunt of author Harold Bell Wright, who is said to have written some of his works there.

The house was listed on the National Register of Historic Places in 1983.

== See also ==
- National Register of Historic Places listings in Dallas County, Arkansas
