= George W. Mallett House =

Historic house in Arkansas, United States

- U.S. National Register of Historic Places
- Location within Arkansas Location within the United States
- Location: Off AR 8, Princeton, Arkansas
- Coordinates: 33°58′41″N 92°37′34″W
- Area: less than one acre
- Built: 1853
- MPS: Dallas County MRA
- NRHP reference No.: 83003526
- Added to NRHP: October 28, 1983

The George W. Mallett House is a historic house in Princeton, Arkansas, the first county seat of Dallas County. Built c. 1853 by George W. Mallett, one of the county's first settlers, it is one of three surviving pre-Civil War houses in the county, and the only one in Princeton. The house was originally built as a dog trot; the breezeway was enclosed around the turn of the 20th century, giving the house its present exterior appearance of a central hall structure. A hip roof covers the original portion of the house, while a gable covers a two-room ell added to the rear (also dating to the turn of the century). A shed-roof porch extends across the width of the main facade, supported by chamfered posts.

The house was listed on the National Register of Historic Places in 1983.

== See also ==
- National Register of Historic Places listings in Dallas County, Arkansas
