= John Russell House =

Historic house in Arkansas, United States

- U.S. National Register of Historic Places
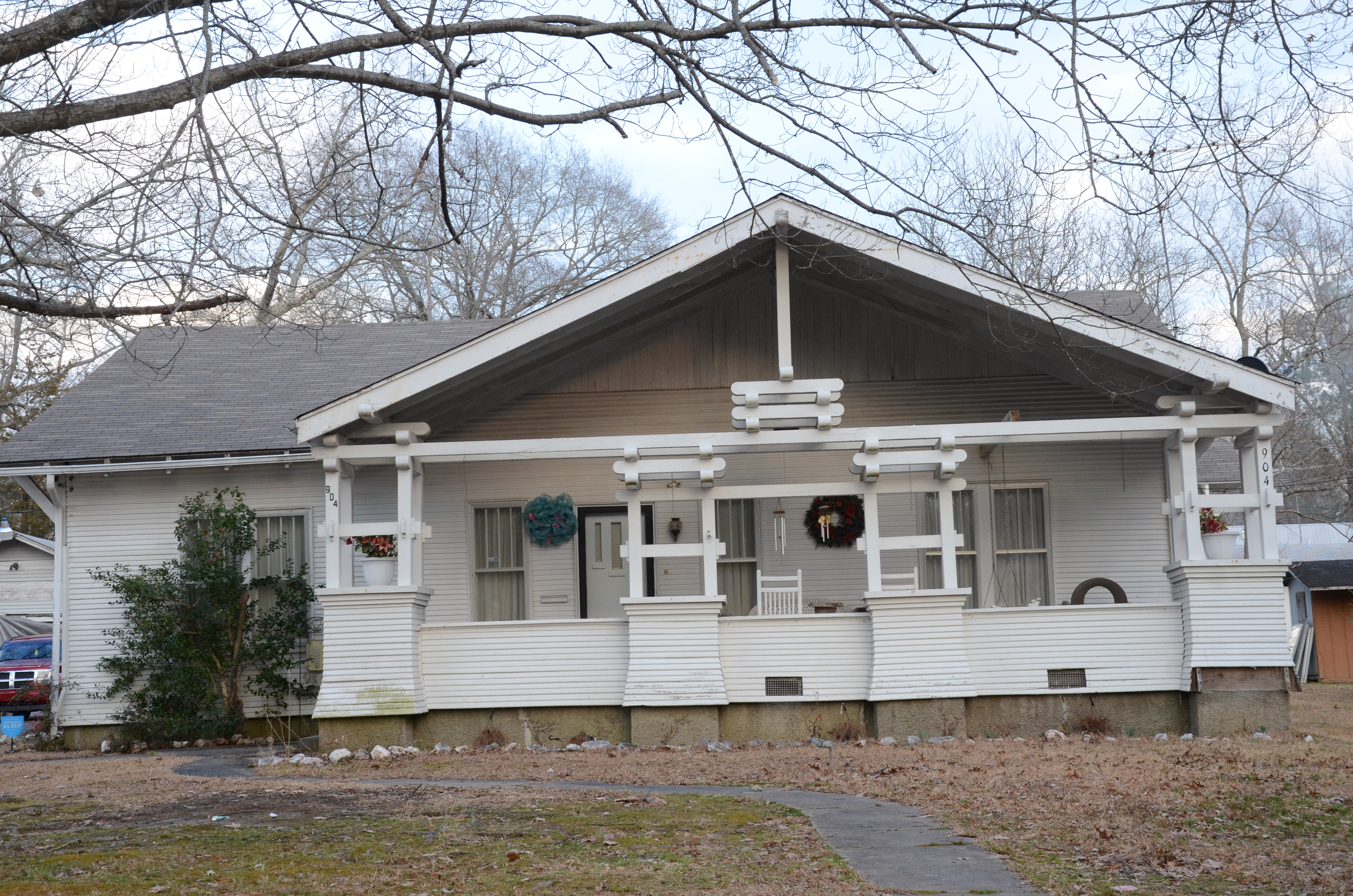

- Location within Arkansas Location within the United States
- Location: 904 Charlotte St., Fordyce, Arkansas
- Coordinates: 33°49′8″N 92°24′29″W
- Area: less than one acre
- Built: 1925
- Architectural style: Bungalow/craftsman
- MPS: Dallas County MRA
- NRHP reference No.: 83003535
- Added to NRHP: October 28, 1983

The John Russell House is a historic house at 904 Charlotte Street in Fordyce, Arkansas. This single-story wood-frame house was built c. 1925, and is Dallas County's finest example of Craftsman architecture. It has an outstanding porch whose roof is supported by four columns of geometrically arranged wooden members. A horizontal tie beam between the inner columns supports a column up to the apex of the gable roof.

The house was listed on the National Register of Historic Places in 1983.

== See also ==
- National Register of Historic Places listings in Dallas County, Arkansas
