= Amis House (Fordyce, Arkansas) =

Historic house in Arkansas, United States

- U.S. National Register of Historic Places
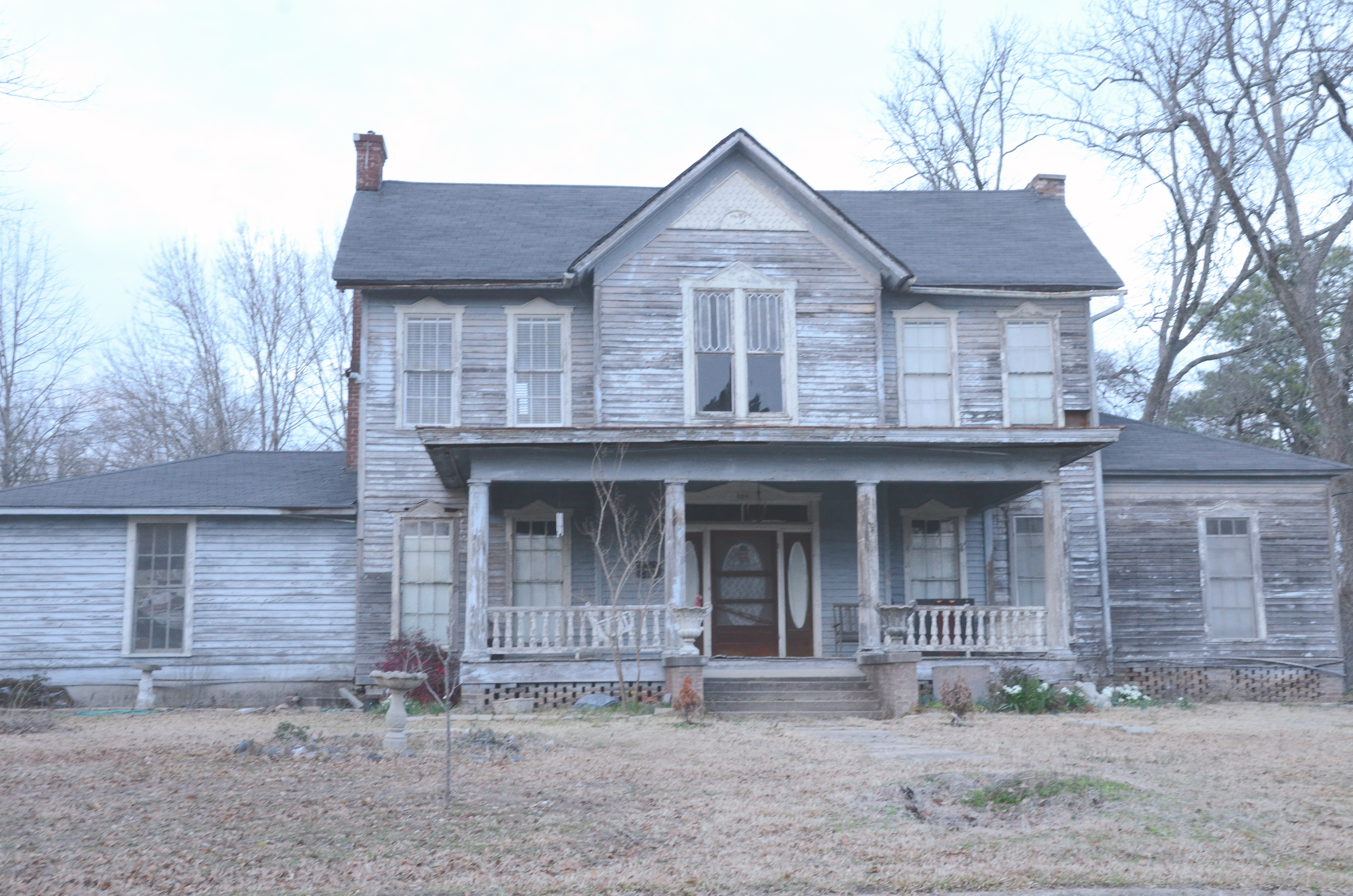

- Location within Arkansas Location within the United States
- Location: 2nd St., Fordyce, Arkansas
- Coordinates: 33°48′40″N 92°24′56″W
- Area: less than one acre
- Built: 1900
- Architectural style: I-House
- MPS: Dallas County MRA
- NRHP reference No.: 83003460
- Added to NRHP: October 28, 1983

The Amis House is a historic house at the northeast corner of 2nd and Mark Streets in Fordyce, Arkansas. Built c. 1900, the two story wood-frame house is one of only two documented I-houses in Dallas County, and is further unusual because it appears in an urban rather than rural setting. The basic I-house plan is extended by a projecting two-story gable bay in the center of the main facade, which has the entry below and a pair of double-hung sash windows above. A single-story porch extends across the front, supported by four Tuscan columns.

The house was listed on the National Register of Historic Places in 1983.

== See also ==
- National Register of Historic Places listings in Dallas County, Arkansas
