= Fordyce station (Rock Island Line) =

Fordyce
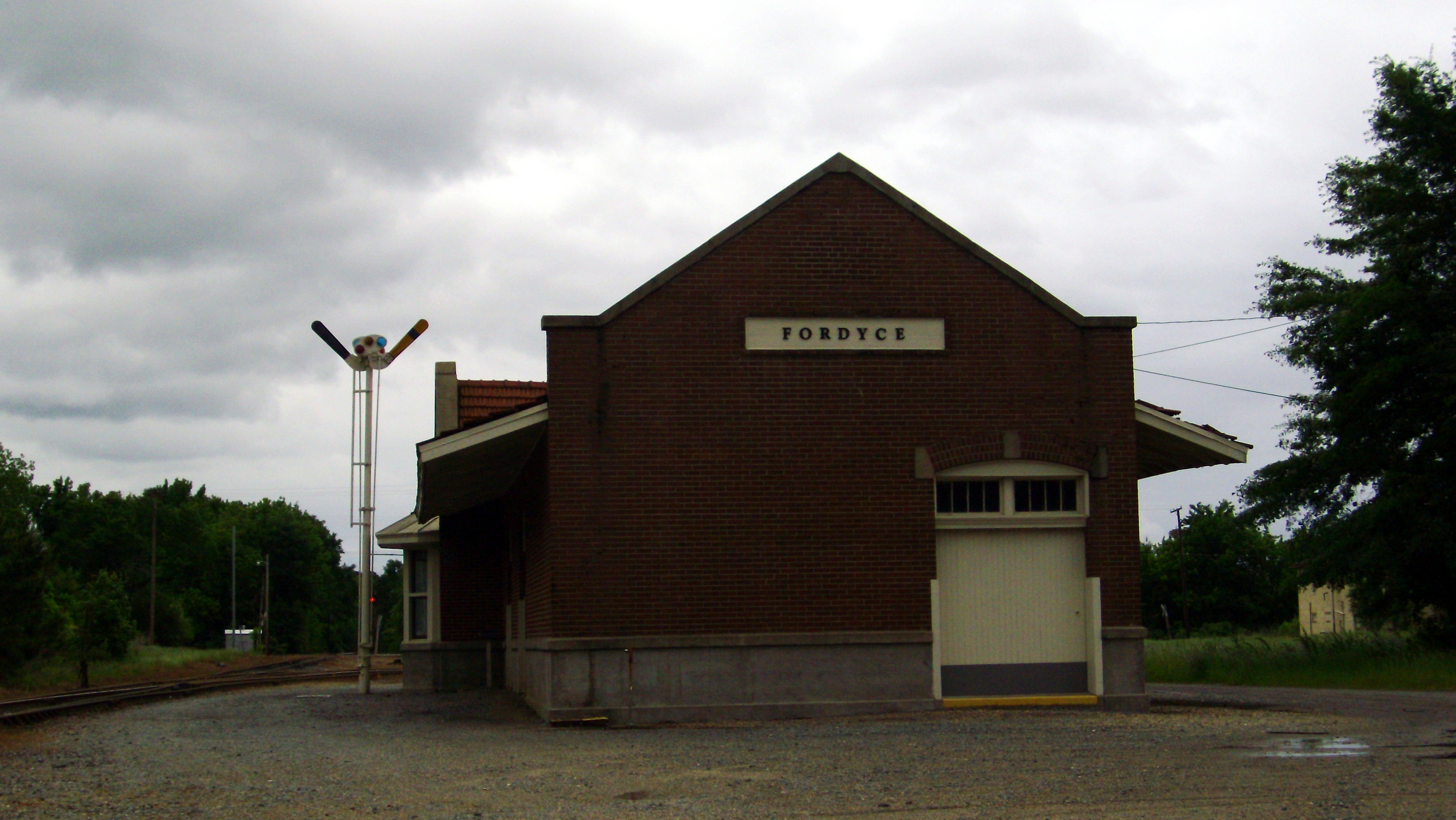
- Fordyce station in May 2014

General information
- Location: East Third Street and Depot Drive, Fordyce, Arkansas 71742
- System: Former Rock Island Line passenger rail station

History
- Rebuilt: c. 1925
- Rock Island Railway Depot
- U.S. National Register of Historic Places
- Location within Arkansas Location within the United States
- Location: 3rd St., Fordyce, Arkansas
- Coordinates: 33°48′49″N 92°24′36″W
- Area: less than one acre
- Built: 1925
- MPS: Dallas County MRA
- NRHP reference No.: 83003534
- Added to NRHP: October 28, 1983
Location

The Rock Island Railway Depot is a historic train station building on 3rd Street in Fordyce, Arkansas. Built c. 1925 by the Rock Island Railroad, it is one of two brick railroad stations to survive from the period in Dallas County. It is a large rectangular structure with a cross-gable tile roof. The building continues to be used by the Fordyce and Princeton Railroad to manage the shipment of lumber products.

The building was listed on the National Register of Historic Places in 1983.

== See also ==
- National Register of Historic Places listings in Dallas County, Arkansas

Preceding station	Chicago, Rock Island and Pacific Railroad	Following station
Carthage toward Little Rock	Little Rock – Eunice	Tinsman toward Eunice
