= Bird Kiln =

Archaeological site in Arkansas, United States

- U.S. National Register of Historic Places
- Location within Arkansas Location within the United States
- Nearest city: Leola, Arkansas
- Area: less than one acre
- NRHP reference No.: 75000381
- Added to NRHP: May 29, 1975

The Bird Kiln is a historic pottery site in rural Dallas County, Arkansas. It is located off Arkansas Highway 9, about 6 miles (9.7 km) southwest of Leola. It is the site of a kiln which was set up in 1843 by William Bird, who established pottery as an industry in the area. Bird operated on the site until 1851, when he moved to another site north of Tulip. He and his brothers produced utilitarian salt glazed goods, and trained a whole generation of potters.

The site was listed on the National Register of Historic Places in 1975.

== See also ==
- National Register of Historic Places listings in Dallas County, Arkansas
