= Dallas County Training School High School Building =

- U.S. National Register of Historic Places
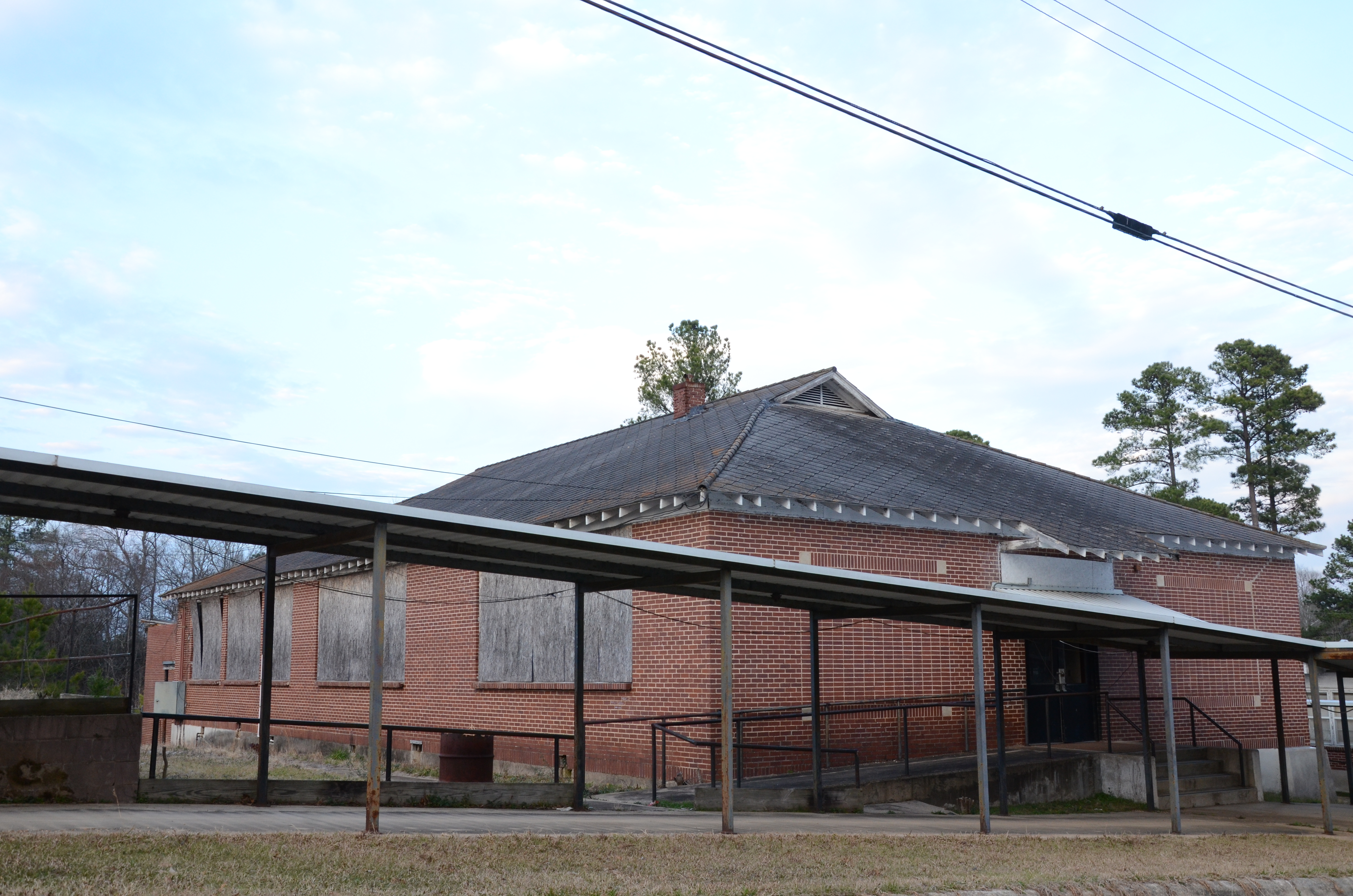

- Location within Arkansas Location within the United States
- Location: 934 Center St., Fordyce, Arkansas
- Coordinates: 33°49′1″N 92°24′7″W
- Area: less than one acre
- Built: 1931
- Architectural style: Bungalow/craftsman
- NRHP reference No.: 03001455
- Added to NRHP: January 21, 2004

The Dallas County Training School High School Building is a historic school building at 934 Center Street in Fordyce, Arkansas. Built in 1934 with funding from the Rosenwald Fund, it was the only high school serving African Americans in a four-county region of southern Arkansas until 1940. Its original block is a rectangular brick structure with a gable-on-hip roof; a flat-roof addition was made to the rear in 1954. The building house grades 6-12 of African Americans until 1970, when the city's schools were integrated. At that time it became an elementary school, and was finally closed in 2001.

The building was listed on the National Register of Historic Places in 2004.

== See also ==
- National Register of Historic Places listings in Dallas County, Arkansas
