= Ed Knight House =

Historic house in Arkansas, United States

- U.S. National Register of Historic Places
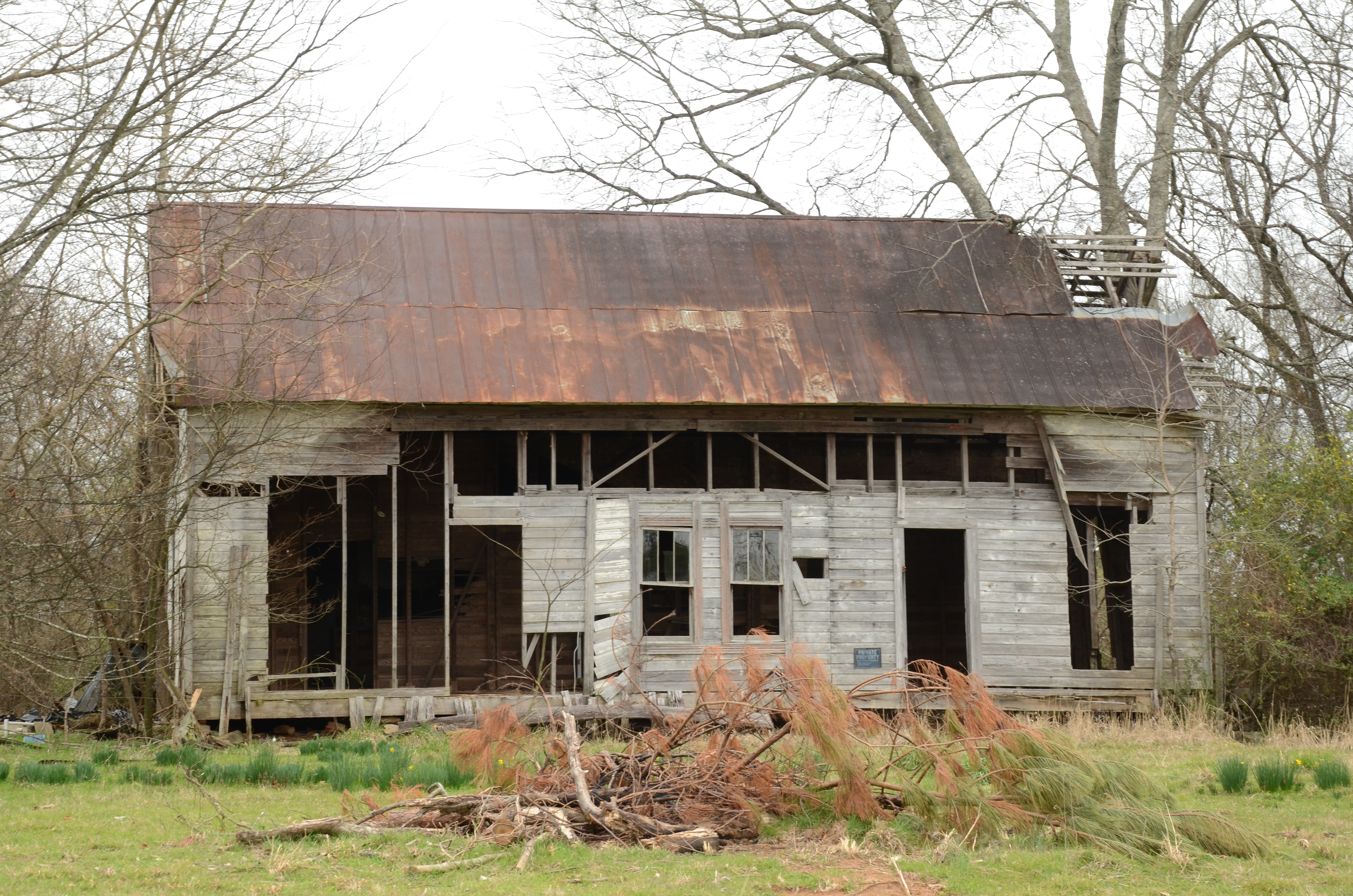

- Location within Arkansas Location within the United States
- Location: Off AR 128, Pine Grove, Arkansas
- Coordinates: 33°51′55″N 92°47′23″W
- Area: less than one acre
- Built: 1880
- MPS: Dallas County MRA
- NRHP reference No.: 83003524
- Added to NRHP: October 28, 1983

The Ed Knight House is a historic house near Pine Grove, a rural community in Dallas County, Arkansas. It is located on County Road 275 off Arkansas Highway 128. In appearance it resembles a double pen house, a narrow and wide structure with a gable roof. Its oldest portion is a dog trot log structure built c. 1880, after which the central passageway was enclosed and an ell added to the south end. This was then sheathed in horizontal weatherboarding. The front facade has a hip-roof porch extending across its width, supported by six turned posts, with jigsaw-cut brackets. The Knights were a prominent local family who settled the area in the 1840s.

The house was listed on the National Register of Historic Places in 1983.

== See also ==
- National Register of Historic Places listings in Dallas County, Arkansas
