= Elliott House (Fordyce, Arkansas) =

Historic house in Arkansas, United States

- U.S. National Register of Historic Places
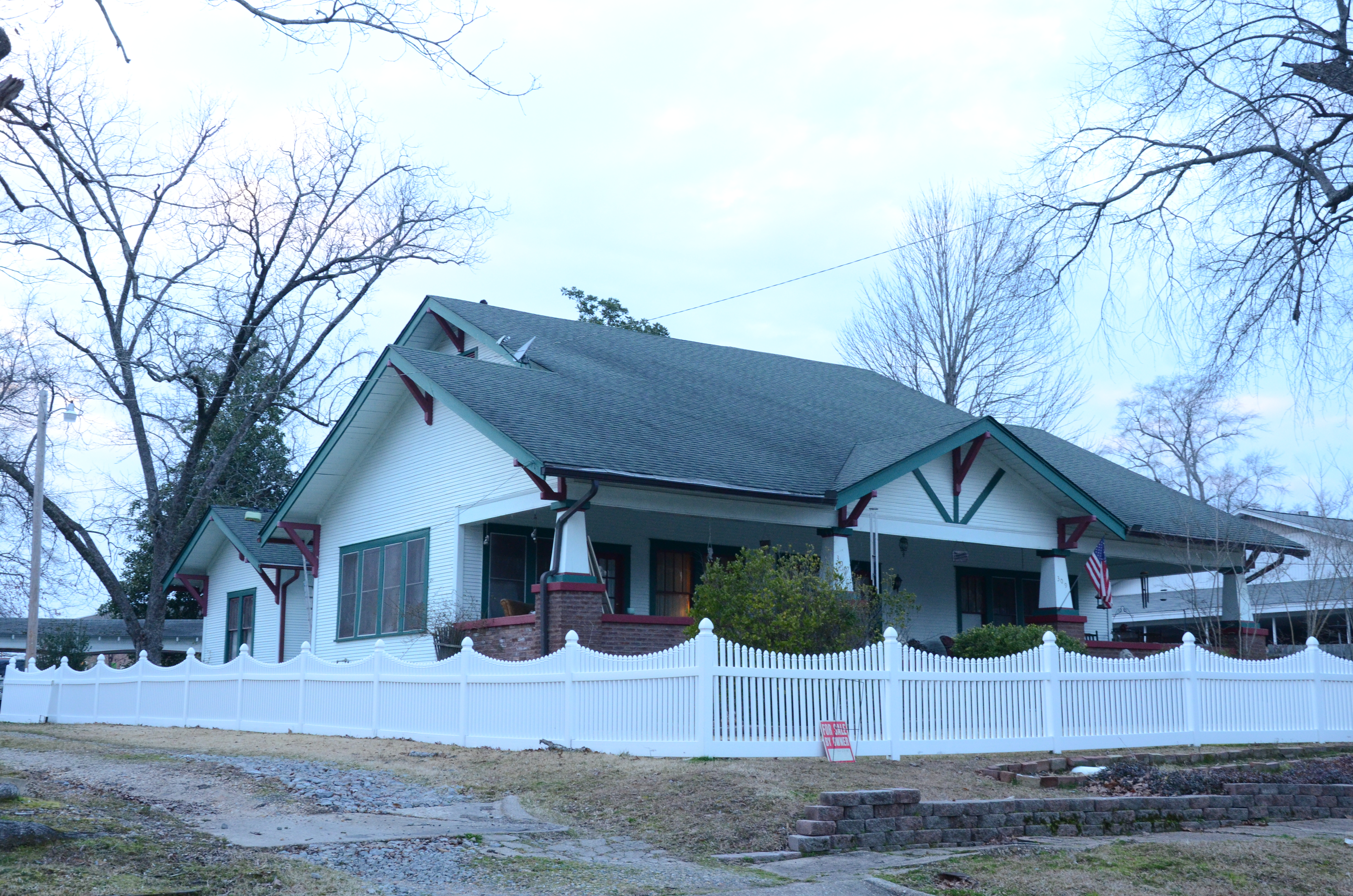

- Location within Arkansas Location within the United States
- Location: 309 Pine St., Fordyce, Arkansas
- Coordinates: 33°48′41″N 92°25′2″W
- Area: less than one acre
- Built: 1925
- Architectural style: Bungalow/craftsman
- MPS: Dallas County MRA
- NRHP reference No.: 84000681
- Added to NRHP: March 27, 1984

The Elliott House is a historic house at 309 Pine Street in Fordyce, Arkansas. The 1 1/2-story wood-frame house was built in 1925, and is a well-executed example of Craftsman style. It is a rectangular structure with three overlapping gabled roof sections with different pitches. The eaves are wide, and decorated with knee braces and exposed purlins. A fourth gable extends over the main entry, which has a twelve-light door with flanking sidelight windows.

The house was listed on the National Register of Historic Places in 1984.

== See also ==
- National Register of Historic Places listings in Dallas County, Arkansas
