= Princeton Cemetery (Arkansas) =

Historic cemetery in Arkansas, United States

- U.S. National Register of Historic Places
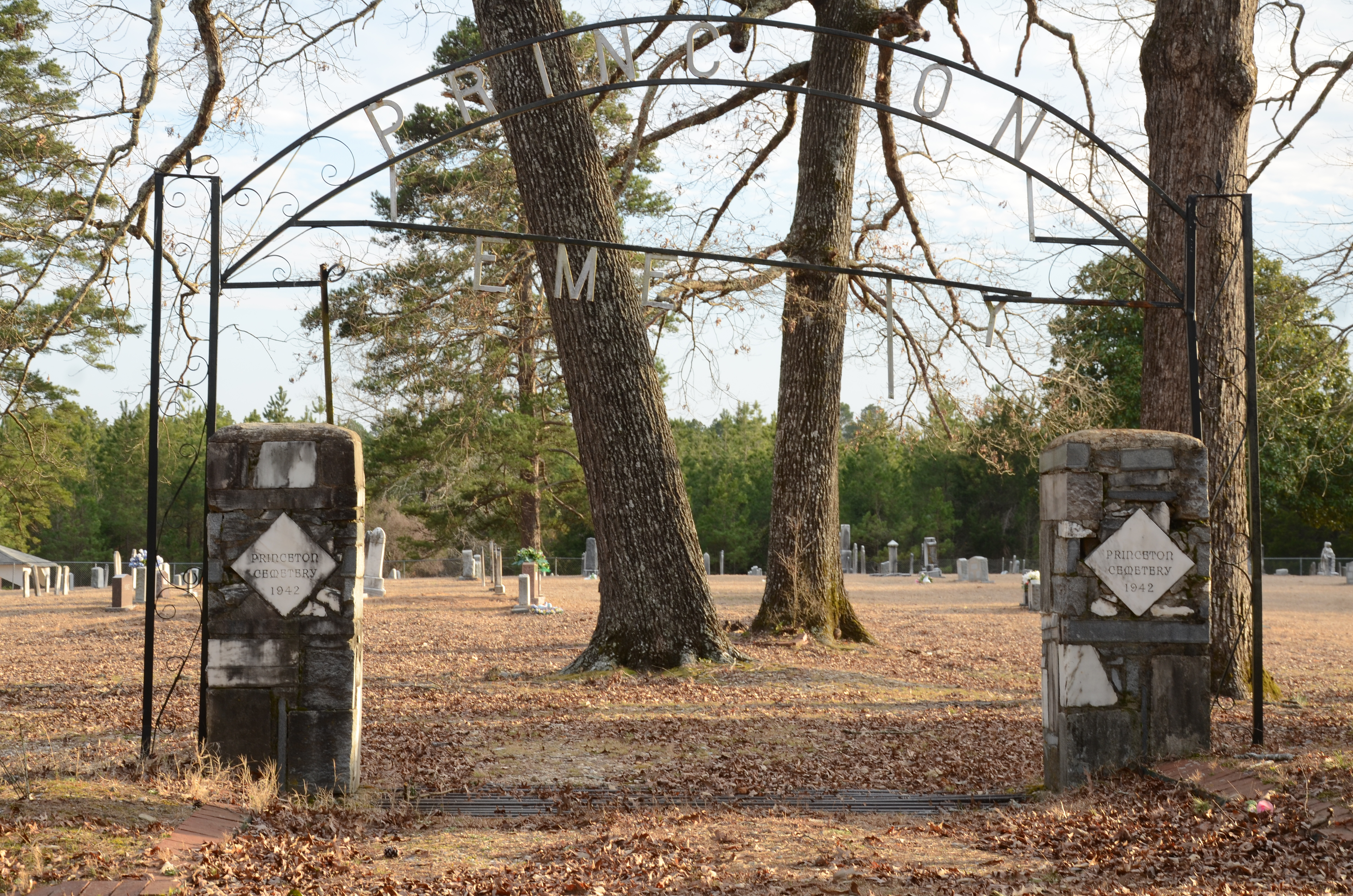

- Location within Arkansas Location within the United States
- Nearest city: Princeton, Arkansas
- Coordinates: 33°58′34″N 92°37′1″W
- Area: 3 acres (1.2 ha)
- Built: 1849
- MPS: Dallas County MRA
- NRHP reference No.: 84000872
- Added to NRHP: March 27, 1984

Princeton Cemetery is a historic pre-Civil War cemetery in rural Dallas County, Arkansas. It is located on County Road 201, southeast of Princeton, which was the county's first seat. The oldest grave is that of William Suggs, an early settler of Princeton who died in 1849. The cemetery is an open tract of land, about 3 acres (1.2 ha) in size, surrounded by forest on three sides, and the road on the fourth.

The cemetery was listed on the National Register of Historic Places in 1984.

== See also ==
- National Register of Historic Places listings in Dallas County, Arkansas
