= National Register of Historic Places listings in Dallas County, Arkansas =

Location of Dallas County in Arkansas

Dallas County, Arkansas, United States, has 42 properties and districts listed on the National Register of Historic Places.

The locations of National Register properties and districts for which the latitude and longitude coordinates are included below may be seen in a map.

Contents: Counties in Arkansas
- Arkansas
- Ashley
- Baxter
- Benton
- Boone
- Bradley
- Calhoun
- Carroll
- Chicot
- Clark
- Clay
- Cleburne
- Cleveland
- Columbia
- Conway
- Craighead
- Crawford
- Crittenden
- Cross
- Dallas
- Desha
- Drew
- Faulkner
- Franklin
- Fulton
- Garland
- Grant
- Greene
- Hempstead
- Hot Spring
- Howard
- Independence
- Izard
- Jackson
- Jefferson
- Johnson
- Lafayette
- Lawrence
- Lee
- Lincoln
- Little River
- Logan
- Lonoke
- Madison
- Marion
- Miller
- Mississippi
- Monroe
- Montgomery
- Nevada
- Newton
- Ouachita
- Perry
- Phillips
- Pike
- Poinsett
- Polk
- Pope
- Prairie
- Pulaski (Little Rock)
- Randolph
- St. Francis
- Saline
- Scott
- Searcy
- Sebastian
- Sevier
- Sharp
- Stone
- Union
- Van Buren
- Washington
- White
- Woodruff
- Yell

This National Park Service list is complete through NPS recent listings posted August 28, 2026.

== Current listings ==
| | Name on the Register | Image | Date listed | Location | City or town | Description |
|---|---|---|---|---|---|---|
| 1 | Amis House | Amis House | October 28, 1983 (#83003460) | 2nd St. 33°48′40″N 92°24′56″W | Fordyce | |
| 2 | Henry Atchley House | Henry Atchley House | October 28, 1983 (#83003461) | Off Highway 8; 34°02′09″N 92°53′09″W | Dalark | |
| 3 | Attwood House | | May 18, 2023 (#100008979) | 1901 W. 4th St. 33°48′43″N 92°26′11″W | Fordyce | |
| 4 | Bank of Carthage | Bank of Carthage | December 22, 1982 (#82000806) | Highway 229; 34°04′27″N 92°33′16″W | Carthage | |
| 5 | Bird Kiln | | May 29, 1975 (#75000381) | Address restricted | Leola | |
| 6 | Brazeale Homestead | Brazeale Homestead | October 28, 1983 (#83003463) | Southeast of Highway 128; 33°51′19″N 92°45′56″W | Pine Grove | |
| 7 | Butler-Matthews Homestead | Butler-Matthews Homestead | October 28, 1983 (#83003465) | Southwest of Tulip off Highway 9; 34°04′28″N 92°39′22″W | Tulip | |
| 8 | Charlotte Street Historic District | Charlotte Street Historic District | September 14, 1987 (#87001348) | Roughly bounded by Holmes, Charlotte, Broadway, and E. College Sts. 33°49′00″N 92°24′27″W | Fordyce | |
| 9 | Cotton Belt Railroad Depot-Fordyce | Cotton Belt Railroad Depot-Fordyce | June 11, 1992 (#92000608) | Southwestern corner of the junction of Main and 1st Sts. 33°48′39″N 92°24′43″W | Fordyce | 1925 railroad depot with Mediterranean influences |
| 10 | Culbertson Kiln | | May 29, 1975 (#75000382) | Address restricted | Princeton | |
| 11 | Dallas County Courthouse | Dallas County Courthouse | March 27, 1984 (#84000677) | 3rd and Oak Sts. 33°48′45″N 92°24′49″W | Fordyce | |
| 12 | Dallas County Training School High School Building | Dallas County Training School High School Building | January 21, 2004 (#03001455) | 934 Center St. 33°49′01″N 92°24′07″W | Fordyce | |
| 13 | Elliott House | Elliott House | March 27, 1984 (#84000681) | 309 Pine St. 33°48′41″N 92°25′02″W | Fordyce | |
| 14 | Fielder House | | October 28, 1983 (#83003467) | U.S. Route 79 Business; 33°48′45″N 92°25′47″W | Fordyce | |
| 15 | First Presbyterian Church | First Presbyterian Church | October 28, 1983 (#83003468) | U.S. Route 79 Business; 33°48′47″N 92°24′53″W | Fordyce | |
| 16 | First United Methodist Church | First United Methodist Church | October 28, 1983 (#83003469) | E. 4th and Spring Sts. 33°48′51″N 92°24′44″W | Fordyce | |
| 17 | Fordyce Commercial Historic District | Fordyce Commercial Historic District | May 20, 2008 (#08000436) | Roughly bounded by Oak, 5th, and Spring Sts., and Highway 274; 33°48′47″N 92°24′45″W | Fordyce | c.1884-1958 commercial core of Fordyce |
| 18 | Fordyce Home Accident Ins. Co. | Fordyce Home Accident Ins. Co. | December 22, 1982 (#82000807) | 300 Main; 33°48′47″N 92°24′43″W | Fordyce | |
| 19 | Fordyce Overpass | | September 11, 2023 (#100009338) | East 4th St. over the Fordyce and Princeton RR; 33°48′53″N 92°24′39″W | Fordyce | |
| 20 | Garrison Place | | October 28, 1983 (#83003470) | South of Highway 48; 34°05′13″N 92°27′54″W | Carthage | Demolished |
| 21 | Capt. Goodgame House | Capt. Goodgame House | October 28, 1983 (#83003471) | 45 Highway 128; 33°49′11″N 92°42′52″W | Holly Springs | |
| 22 | Gulf Oil Filling Station | | March 13, 2023 (#100008559) | 211 West 4th St. 33°48′46″N 92°24′53″W | Fordyce | |
| 23 | Hampton Springs Cemetery (Black Section) | | October 28, 1983 (#83003473) | Off Highway 48; 34°05′21″N 92°29′24″W | Carthage | |
| 24 | Ed Knight House | Ed Knight House | October 28, 1983 (#83003524) | Off Highway 128; 33°51′55″N 92°47′23″W | Pine Grove | |
| 25 | George W. Mallett House | | October 28, 1983 (#83003526) | Off Highway 8; 33°58′41″N 92°37′34″W | Princeton | |
| 26 | Marathon Oil Service Station | Marathon Oil Service Station | May 10, 2001 (#01000484) | E. 2nd and Spring St. 33°48′43″N 92°24′43″W | Fordyce | |
| 27 | Mt. Carmel Methodist Church | Mt. Carmel Methodist Church | October 28, 1983 (#83003528) | Highway 9; 33°54′13″N 92°38′15″W | Jacinto | |
| 28 | Mt. Zion Methodist Church | Mt. Zion Methodist Church | October 28, 1983 (#83003529) | Northeast of Carthage; 34°06′32″N 92°31′15″W | Carthage | |
| 29 | Nutt-Trussell Building | Nutt-Trussell Building | March 4, 2001 (#01000110) | 202 N. Main St. 33°48′44″N 92°24′41″W | Fordyce | |
| 30 | Princeton Cemetery | Princeton Cemetery | March 27, 1984 (#84000872) | Off Highway 9; 33°58′34″N 92°37′01″W | Princeton | |
| 31 | Prosperity Baptist Church | Prosperity Baptist Church | May 22, 2003 (#03000421) | Highway 8, W. 33°52′29″N 92°33′09″W | Ramsey | |
| 32 | Rock Island Railway Depot | Rock Island Railway Depot | October 28, 1983 (#83003534) | 3rd St. 33°48′49″N 92°24′36″W | Fordyce | |
| 33 | John Russell House | John Russell House | October 28, 1983 (#83003535) | 904 Charlotte St. 33°49′08″N 92°24′29″W | Fordyce | |
| 34 | Sardis Methodist Church | Sardis Methodist Church | October 28, 1983 (#83003540) | Northeast of Pine Grove off Highway 128; 33°53′42″N 92°46′09″W | Sparkman | |
| 35 | Jessie B. Smith House | Jessie B. Smith House | October 28, 1983 (#83003541) | Off U.S. Route 79; 33°48′52″N 92°24′27″W | Fordyce | |
| 36 | Tennessee, Alabama & Georgia Railway Steam Locomotive #101 | Tennessee, Alabama & Georgia Railway Steam Locomotive #101 | January 24, 2008 (#07001425) | Northwest of the junction of N. Main St. and the Union Pacific railroad line 33°48′46″N 92°24′42″W | Fordyce | 1922 locomotive |
| 37 | Thomas Homestead | Thomas Homestead | March 27, 1984 (#84000895) | Off Highway 7; 33°59′05″N 92°51′17″W | Fairview | |
| 38 | Tulip Cemetery | Tulip Cemetery | October 28, 1983 (#83003543) | Off Highway 9; 34°04′40″N 92°39′28″W | Tulip | |
| 39 | Waters House | Waters House | December 22, 1982 (#82000808) | 515 Oak St. 33°48′51″N 92°24′54″W | Fordyce | |
| 40 | Welch Pottery Works | | May 12, 1975 (#75000383) | Address restricted | Tulip | |
| 41 | Wommack Kiln | | June 10, 1975 (#75000384) | Address restricted | Wave | |
| 42 | Wynne House | Wynne House | October 28, 1983 (#83003544) | 4th St. 33°48′45″N 92°25′00″W | Fordyce | |

== Former listings ==
| | Name on the Register | Image | Date listed | Date removed | Location | City or town | Description |
|---|---|---|---|---|---|---|---|
| 1 | Brewster House | | October 28, 1983 (#83003464) | January 14, 2002 | U.S. Route 79 | Fordyce | |
| 2 | Koonce Building | | October 28, 1983 (#83003525) | January 14, 2002 | 3rd Street | Fordyce | |
| 3 | Old Fordyce Post Office | | October 28, 1983 (#83003530) | January 14, 2002 | E. 2nd Street | Fordyce | |
| 4 | Princeton Methodist Church | | October 28, 1983 (#83003533) | January 14, 2002 | Arkansas Highway 9 | Princeton | |

== See also ==
- List of National Historic Landmarks in Arkansas
- National Register of Historic Places listings in Arkansas
