= Henry Atchley House =

Historic house in Arkansas, United States

- U.S. National Register of Historic Places
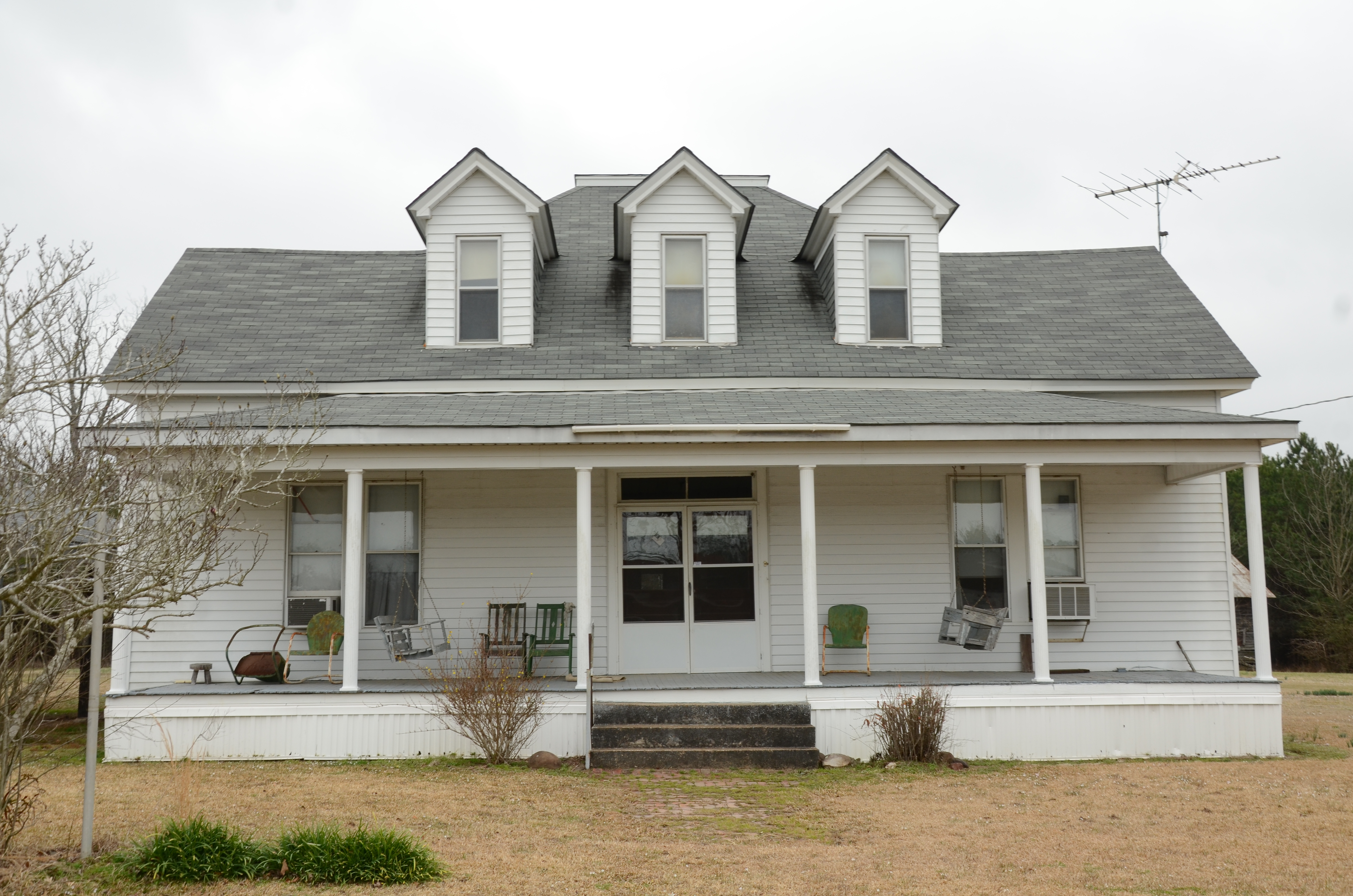

- Location within Arkansas Location within the United States
- Location: Off AR 8, Dalark, Arkansas
- Coordinates: 34°2′9″N 92°53′9″W
- Area: less than one acre
- Built: 1908
- Architectural style: Colonial Revival, Colonial Cottage
- MPS: Dallas County MRA
- NRHP reference No.: 83003461
- Added to NRHP: October 28, 1983

The Henry Atchley House is a historic house in Dalark, Arkansas, a rural town in western Dallas County. It is located on County Road 249, just off Arkansas Highway 8. The two story wood-frame house was built in 1908 by Henry Atchley, who ran a general store in town. The house is basically vernacular in form, but has a number of stylish elements, including turned posts supporting a hip-roofed porch across the front, and a double-door entry with transom window. The front block of the house has a side-gable roof pierced by three gabled dormers, and there is a cross-gabled ell extended to the rear. The house was built in the economic boom associated with the arrival of the railroad and the community's subsequent economic success as a lumber town.

The house was listed on the National Register of Historic Places in 1983.

== See also ==
- National Register of Historic Places listings in Dallas County, Arkansas
