= Wommack Kiln =

Archaeological site in Arkansas, United States

- U.S. National Register of Historic Places
- Location within Arkansas Location within the United States
- Nearest city: Wave, Arkansas
- Coordinates: 34°1′10″N 92°40′56″W
- Area: less than one acre
- Architect: Welch, John
- NRHP reference No.: 75000384
- Added to NRHP: June 10, 1975

The Wommack Kiln is a history pottery site in central rural Dallas County, Arkansas. Built in 1891 by John Welch, it is the best-preserved of a series of pottery works established in Dallas County in the later decades of the 19th century. Welch established this site after abandoning an earlier site he set up in the 1880s.

The kiln site was listed on the National Register of Historic Places in 1975. It is located off County Road 302, roughly midway between its junctions with CR 301 and CR 314.

== See also ==
- National Register of Historic Places listings in Dallas County, Arkansas
