= Mt. Zion Methodist Church (Carthage, Arkansas) =

Historic church in Arkansas, United States

- U.S. National Register of Historic Places
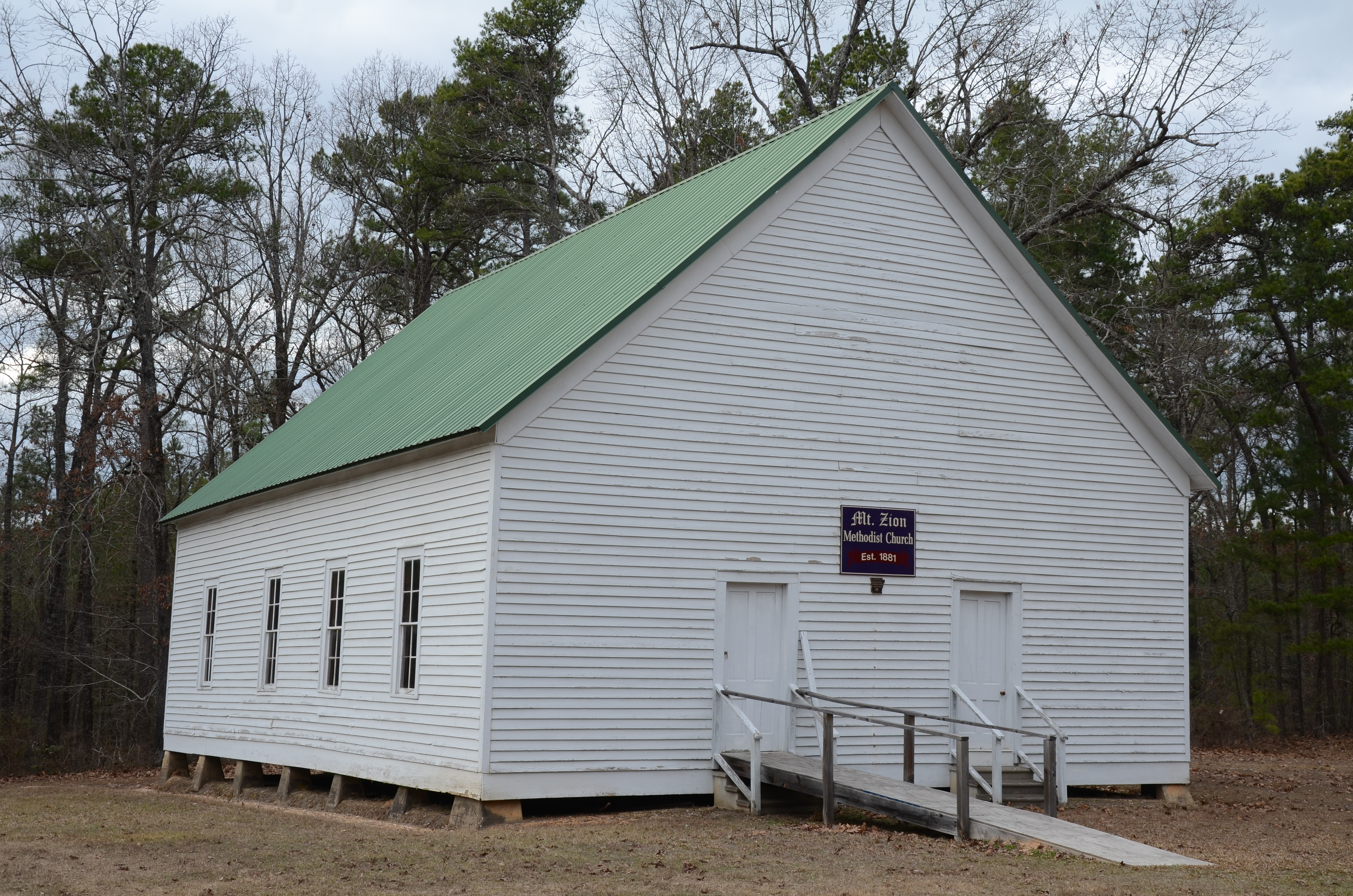

- Location within Arkansas Location within the United States
- Nearest city: Carthage, Arkansas
- Coordinates: 34°6′32″N 92°31′15″W
- Area: less than one acre
- Built: 1910
- MPS: Dallas County MRA
- NRHP reference No.: 83003529
- Added to NRHP: October 28, 1983

Mt. Zion Methodist Church is a historic church in rural Dallas County, Arkansas. The church is located on County Road 407, roughly 2.5 miles northeast of Carthage. The wood frame clapboarded structure was built c. 1910, and is virtually unaltered since its construction. The main facade has two doors (traditionally one each for men and women), and features very simple vernacular styling. The church is notable for its well-preserved interior.

The church was listed on the National Register of Historic Places in 1983.

== Gallery ==
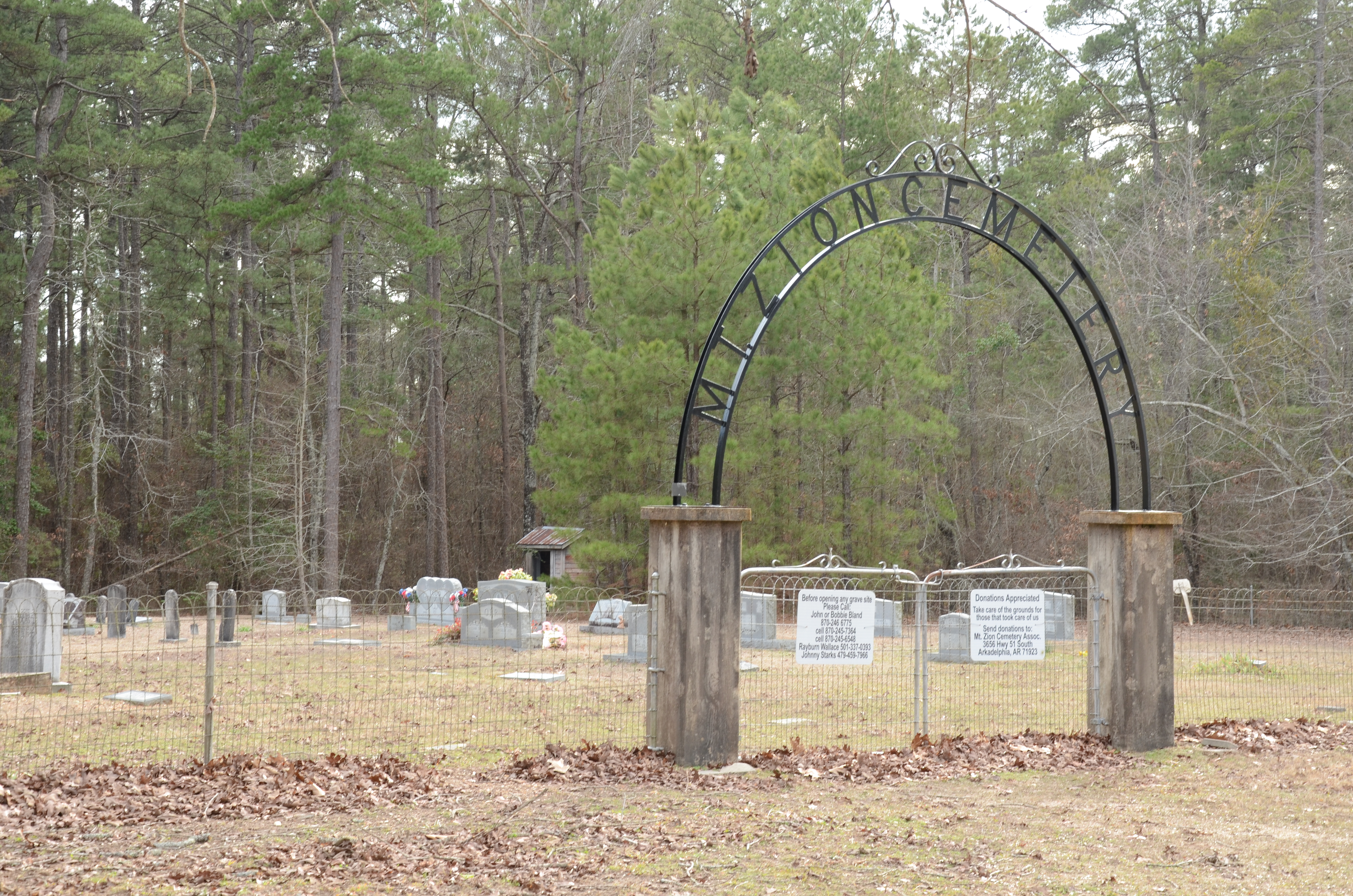
Mt. Zion Methodist Church Cemetery, entrance

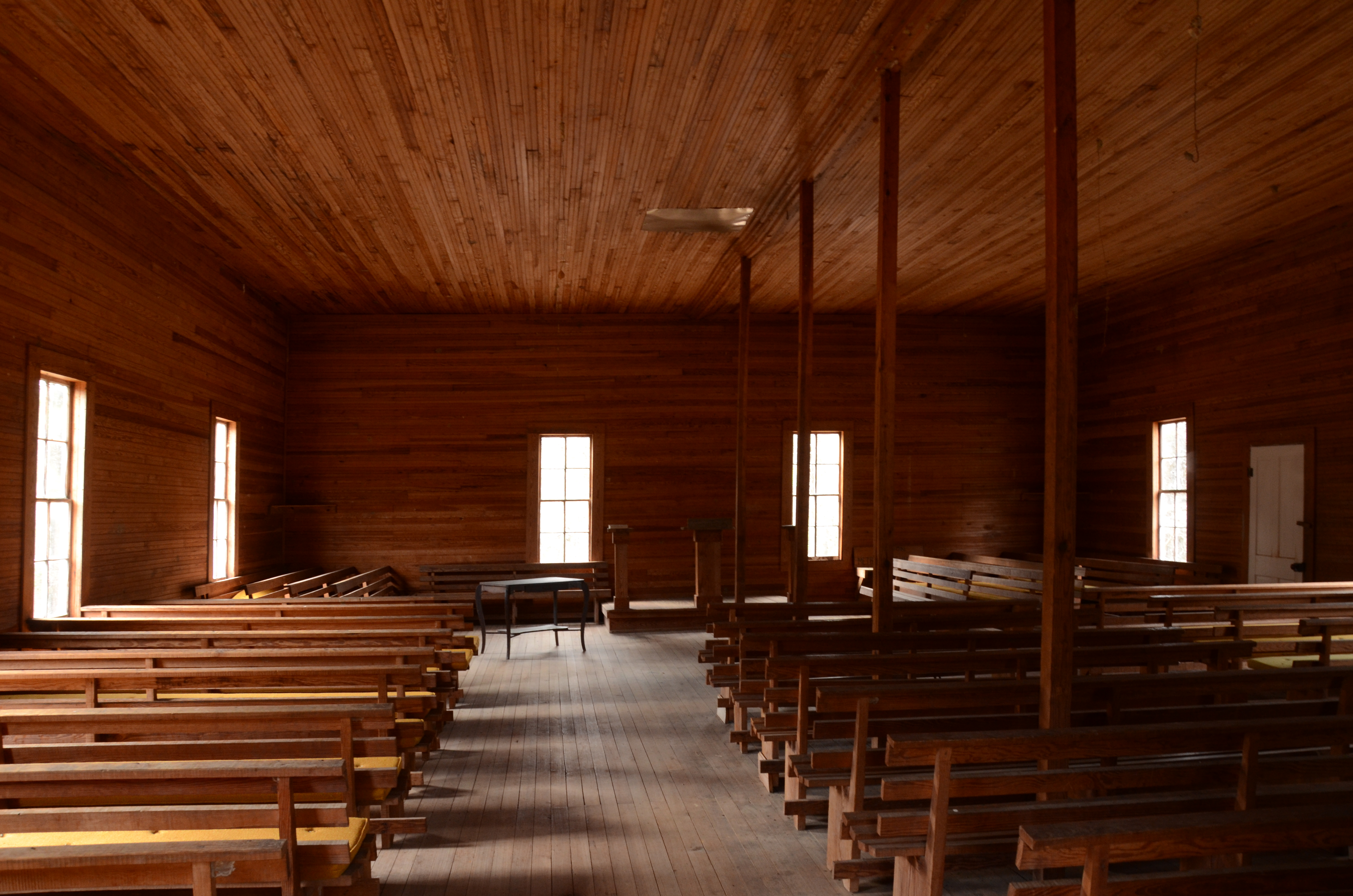
Mt. Zion Methodist Church, interior

== See also ==
- National Register of Historic Places listings in Dallas County, Arkansas
