= Garrison Place =

Historic house in Arkansas, United States

- U.S. National Register of Historic Places
- Location within Arkansas Location within the United States
- Nearest city: Carthage, Arkansas
- Coordinates: 34°5′13″N 92°27′54″W
- Area: 1 acre (0.40 ha)
- Built: 1861
- MPS: Dallas County MRA
- NRHP reference No.: 83003470
- Added to NRHP: October 28, 1983

The Garrison Place was a historic house in rural Dallas County, Arkansas. Built c. 1861, it was a rectangular single-story braced-frame structure clad in weatherboard, and was the only 1860s house of that type in the county, exhibiting other construction features not found in any other period buildings in the county. It was located on a dirt road 1/2 mile south of Highway 48.

The house was listed on the National Register of Historic Places in 1983. It has since been demolished.

== See also ==
- National Register of Historic Places listings in Dallas County, Arkansas
