= Jessie B. Smith House =

Historic house in Arkansas, United States

- U.S. National Register of Historic Places
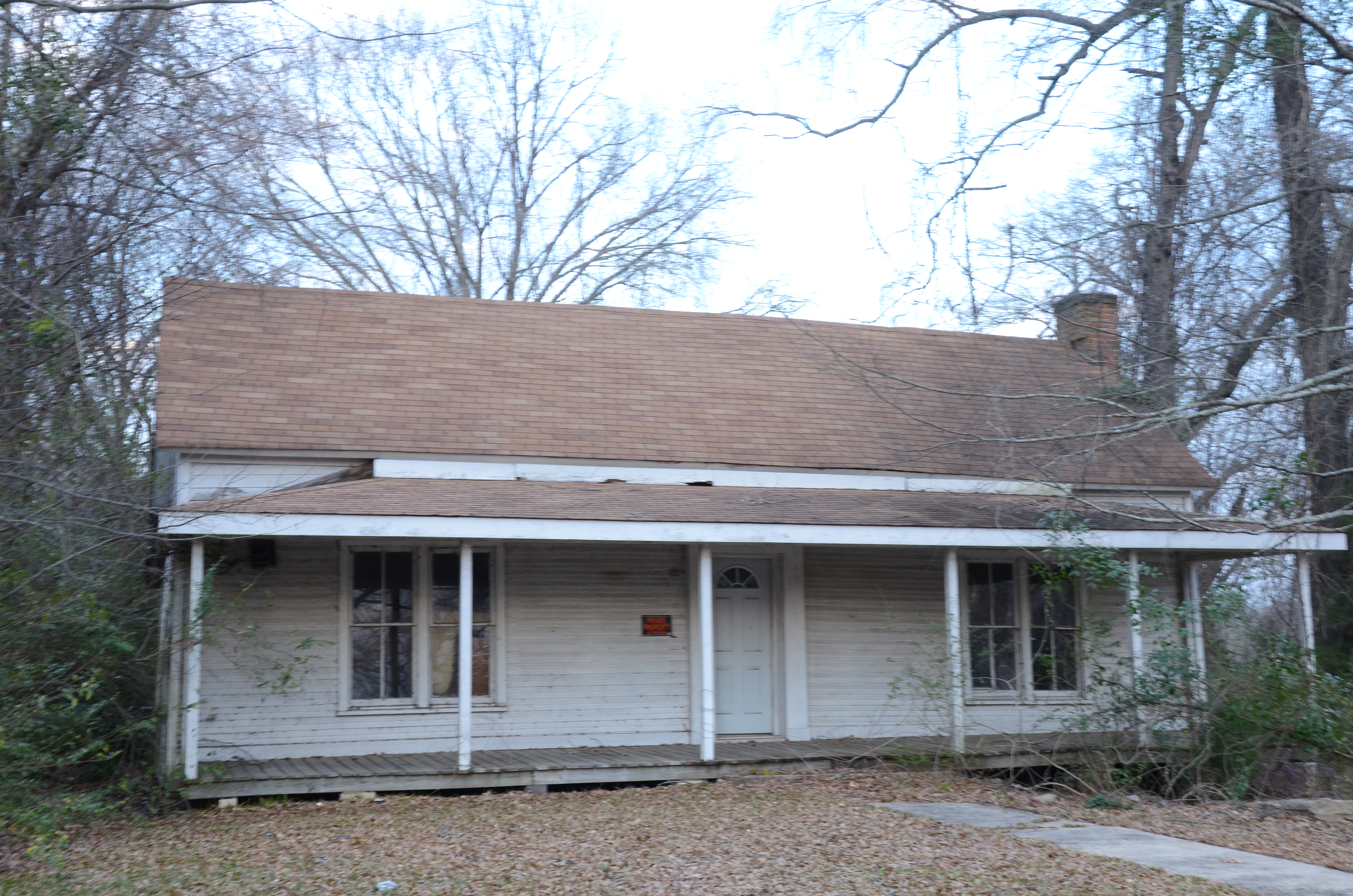

- Location within Arkansas Location within the United States
- Location: 200 Charlotte St., Fordyce, Arkansas
- Coordinates: 33°48′52″N 92°24′27″W
- Area: less than one acre
- Built: 1890
- Architectural style: Center hall plan
- MPS: Dallas County MRA
- NRHP reference No.: 83003541
- Added to NRHP: October 28, 1983

The Jessie B. Smith House is a historic house located at 200 Charlotte Street in Fordyce, Arkansas.

== Description and history ==
This single-story wood-framed house was built in about 1890, and is an excellent early instance of a center-hall-plan house, a style which was brought about by growing urbanization. The house is three bays wide and one deep, with a brick chimney at the north end. The porch which extends across the front has jigsaw-cut brackets.

The house was listed in the National Register of Historic Places on October 28, 1983.

== See also ==
- National Register of Historic Places listings in Dallas County, Arkansas
