= Waters House (Fordyce, Arkansas) =

Historic house in Arkansas, United States

- U.S. National Register of Historic Places
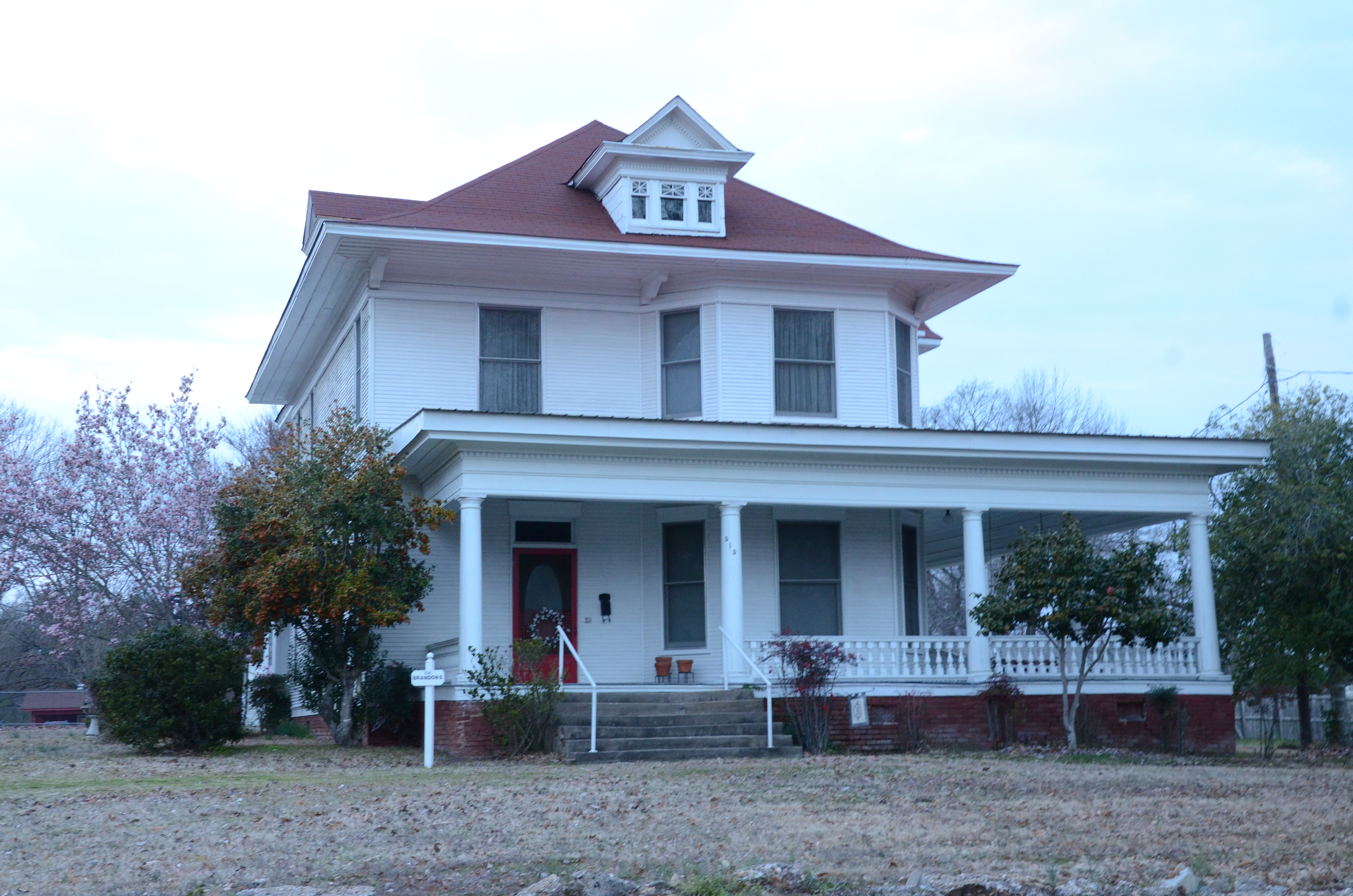

- Location within Arkansas Location within the United States
- Location: 515 Oak St., Fordyce, Arkansas
- Coordinates: 33°48′51″N 92°24′54″W
- Area: less than one acre
- Built: 1907
- Architect: Charles L. Thompson
- Architectural style: Colonial Revival
- MPS: Thompson, Charles L., Design Collection TR
- NRHP reference No.: 82000808
- Added to NRHP: December 22, 1982

The Waters House is a historic house at 515 Oak Street in Fordyce, Arkansas. The 2 1/2-story Foursquare house was designed by Charles L. Thompson and built in 1907, and is one of the finest Colonial Revival houses in the city. It has a hipped roof with flared eaves, and cross gables on the sides. The main facade features a projecting bay that rises the full two stories, and is topped by a gable with dentil molding and flared eaves. A single-story porch wraps around two sides of the house.

The house was listed on the National Register of Historic Places in 1982.

== See also ==
- National Register of Historic Places listings in Dallas County, Arkansas
