= Prosperity Baptist Church =

Historic church in Arkansas, United States

- U.S. National Register of Historic Places
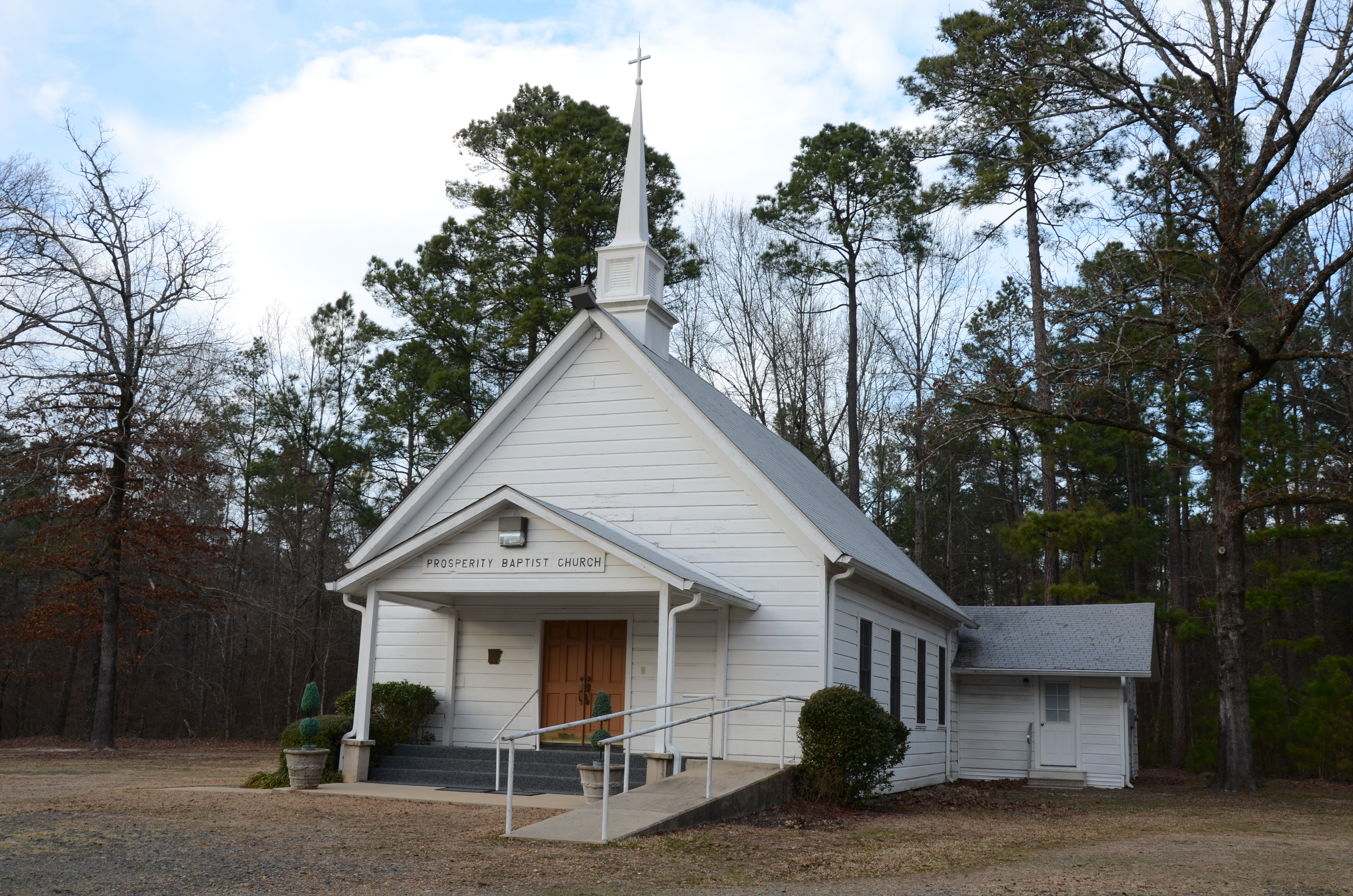

- Location within Arkansas Location within the United States
- Location: AR 8 W, Ramsey, Arkansas
- Coordinates: 33°52′29″N 92°33′9″W
- Area: 1.5 acres (0.61 ha)
- Built: 1904
- Architectural style: Plain-Traditional
- NRHP reference No.: 03000421
- Added to NRHP: May 22, 2003

Prosperity Baptist Church is a historic church on Arkansas Highway 8 West in the rural community of Ramsey, Arkansas, located in central Dallas County. The single-story Plain Traditional wood-frame church was built in 1904, with a major addition in 1945 giving it its present T shape. It is a gable roof structure resting on a foundation of concrete piers and petrified wood. The church was built on land purchased from the Fordyce Lumber Company by a congregation organized in 1902. It is the only surviving building from Ramsey's early days.

The church was listed on the National Register of Historic Places in 2003.

== See also ==
- National Register of Historic Places listings in Dallas County, Arkansas
