= Wynn House =

Wynn House or Wynne House may refer to:

in the United States

(by state)

- Wynne House (Fordyce, Arkansas), listed on the NRHP in Arkansas
- Wynn-Price House, Garland, Arkansas, listed on the NRHP in Arkansas
- Wynn House (Columbus, Georgia), listed on the NRHP in Georgia
- Thomas Wynne House, Lilburn, Georgia, listed on the NRHP in Georgia
- Wynne's Folly, Engelhard, North Carolina, listed on the NRHP in North Carolina
- Heck-Lee, Heck-Wynne, and Heck-Pool Houses, Raleigh, North Carolina, listed on the NRHP in North Carolina
- James Wynn House, Tazewell, Virginia, listed on the NRHP in Virginia
