= Wynne House (Fordyce, Arkansas) =

Historic house in Arkansas, United States

- U.S. National Register of Historic Places
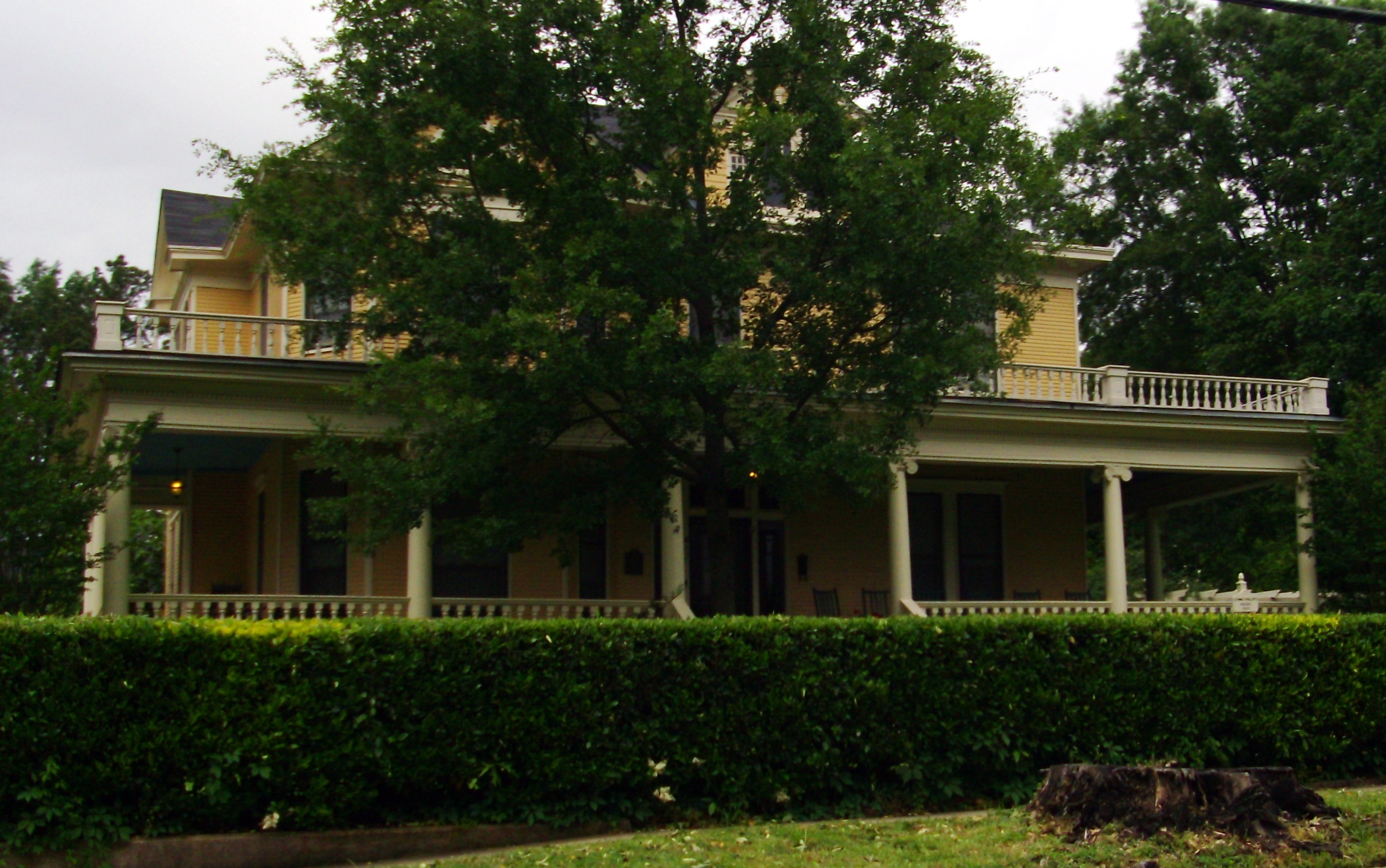

- Location within Arkansas Location within the United States
- Location: 4th St., Fordyce, Arkansas
- Coordinates: 33°48′45″N 92°25′0″W
- Built: 1914
- Architectural style: Classical Revival
- MPS: Dallas County MRA
- NRHP reference No.: 83003544
- Added to NRHP: October 28, 1983

The Wynne House is a historic house on 4th Street in Fordyce, Arkansas. The two story wood-frame house was built in 1914, and is the city's best example of residential Classical Revival architecture. It is Foursquare in plan, with a hip roof with large gable dormers projecting. A porch wraps around two sides, featuring elaborate spindled balusters and Ionic columns.

The house was listed on the National Register of Historic Places in 1983.

== See also ==
- National Register of Historic Places listings in Dallas County, Arkansas
