= Welch Pottery Works =

- U.S. National Register of Historic Places
- Nearest city: Tulip, Arkansas
- Area: 8 acres (3.2 ha)
- NRHP reference No.: 75000383
- Added to NRHP: May 12, 1975

The Welch Pottery Works of Dallas County, Arkansas, were active from c. 1851 to c. 1891. The pottery works, consisting of a kiln, sawmill, and other facilities, was established by the Bird brothers, who had been operating another kiln near Tulip since 1843.

The works were purchased in 1860 by John Welch, who operated here until 1891, when he established another kiln near Wave. This site was then abandoned. The Birds and Welch produced utilitarian salt-glaze pottery.

The site of the pottery works was listed on the National Register of Historic Places in 1975.

== See also ==
- National Register of Historic Places listings in Dallas County, Arkansas
