= Chris McNair =

American politician and businessman (1925–2019)

Jefferson County Commission
- In office 1986 - 2001

Alabama House of Representatives
- In office 1973 - 1981

Personal details
- Born: Jewell Christopher McNair; November 22, 1925 Fordyce, Arkansas, USA
- Died: May 8, 2019 (aged 93) Birmingham, Alabama, USA
- Party: Democratic
- Spouse: Maxine Pippen
- Children: 3
- Education: Tuskegee University

Jewell Christopher McNair (November 22, 1925 – May 8, 2019) was an American politician and businessman.

== Biography ==
McNair was born in Fordyce, Arkansas. He met his future wife Maxine Pippen when both were attending the Tuskegee Institute in 1945. That same year, he served in the United States Army during World War II. He received his degree in agronomy from Tuskegee University in 1949. A year later, McNair married Pippen and moved closer to her mother's home in Birmingham, Alabama. Their oldest daughter Carol Denise was born in 1951. McNair served as a teacher at A. H. Parker High School and opened a photography business in Titusville in 1962.

On September 15, 1963, his daughter Denise McNair and three other children were killed in the bombing of the 16th Street Baptist Church. A year after Denise was killed, the couple had their second daughter, Lisa, and four years later, their third daughter Kimberly was born.

== Career ==
As a Democrat, McNair served in the Alabama House of Representatives from 1973 to 1981. He then served on the Jefferson County Commission from 1986 until 2001. In April 2006, McNair was convicted on bribery charges linked to a $3 billion sewer project in Jefferson County. He was sentenced to five years in prison and ordered to pay more than $850,000 in restitution for his conviction. After the conviction, he remained free on appeal while waiting for the 11th Circuit Court of Appeals ruling. After his appeals were rejected, he began serving his prison sentence in 2011. He was released in 2013 based on compassionate grounds.

== Death ==
On May 8, 2019, McNair died at his home in Birmingham, Alabama, at the age of 93.
