= Thomas Homestead =

Historic house in Arkansas, United States

- U.S. National Register of Historic Places
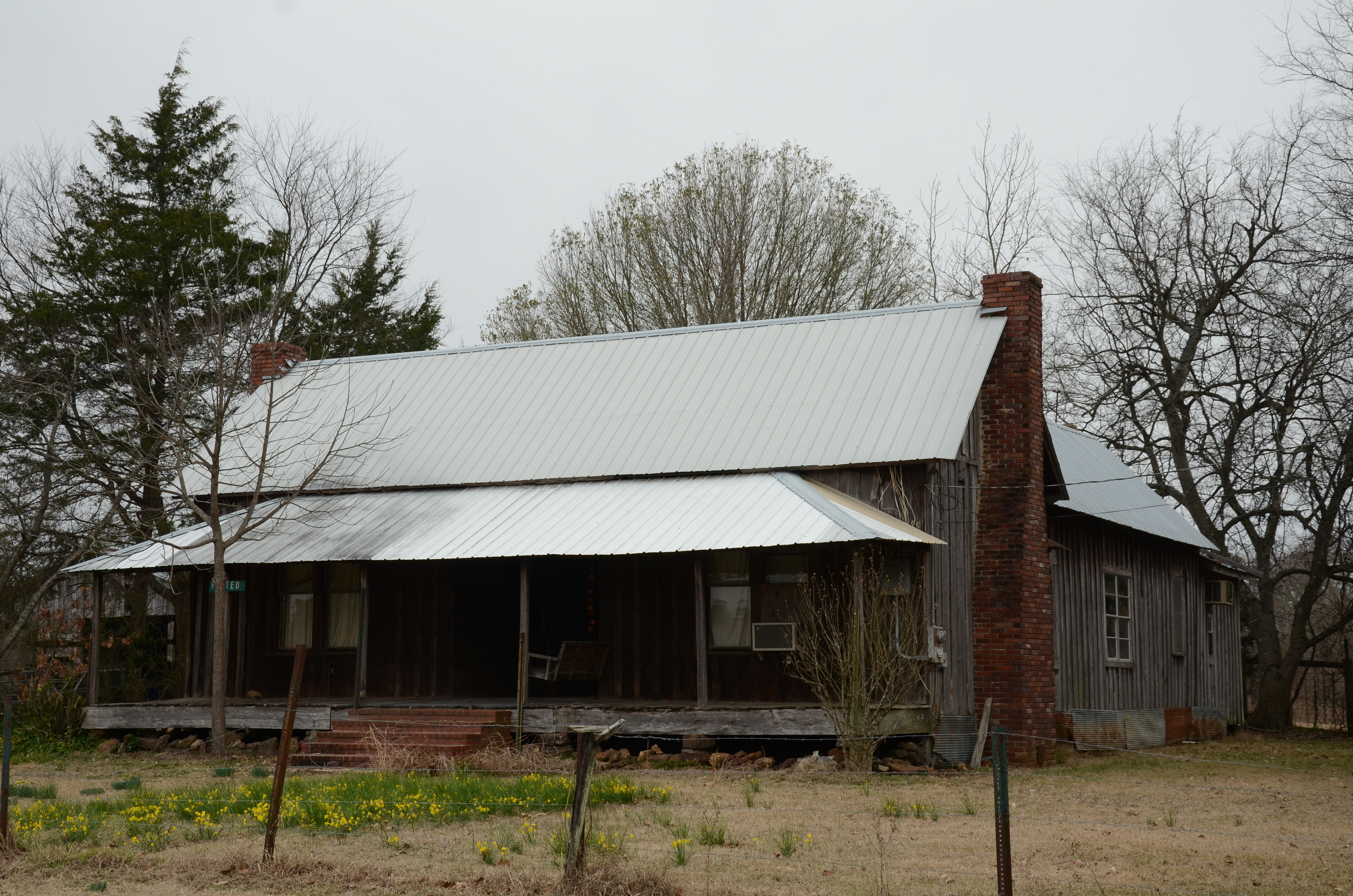
- Location: Off AR 7, Fairview, Arkansas
- Area: 2.5 acres (1.0 ha)
- Built: 1910
- MPS: Dallas County MRA
- NRHP reference No.: 84000895
- Added to NRHP: March 27, 1984

The Thomas Homestead is a historic homestead off Arkansas Highway 7 in Fairview, Arkansas. The property includes a dogtrot house built c. 1910, a potato house, and outbuildings including barns and sheds.

The property was listed on the National Register of Historic Places in 1984.

== See also ==
- National Register of Historic Places listings in Dallas County, Arkansas

== Gallery ==
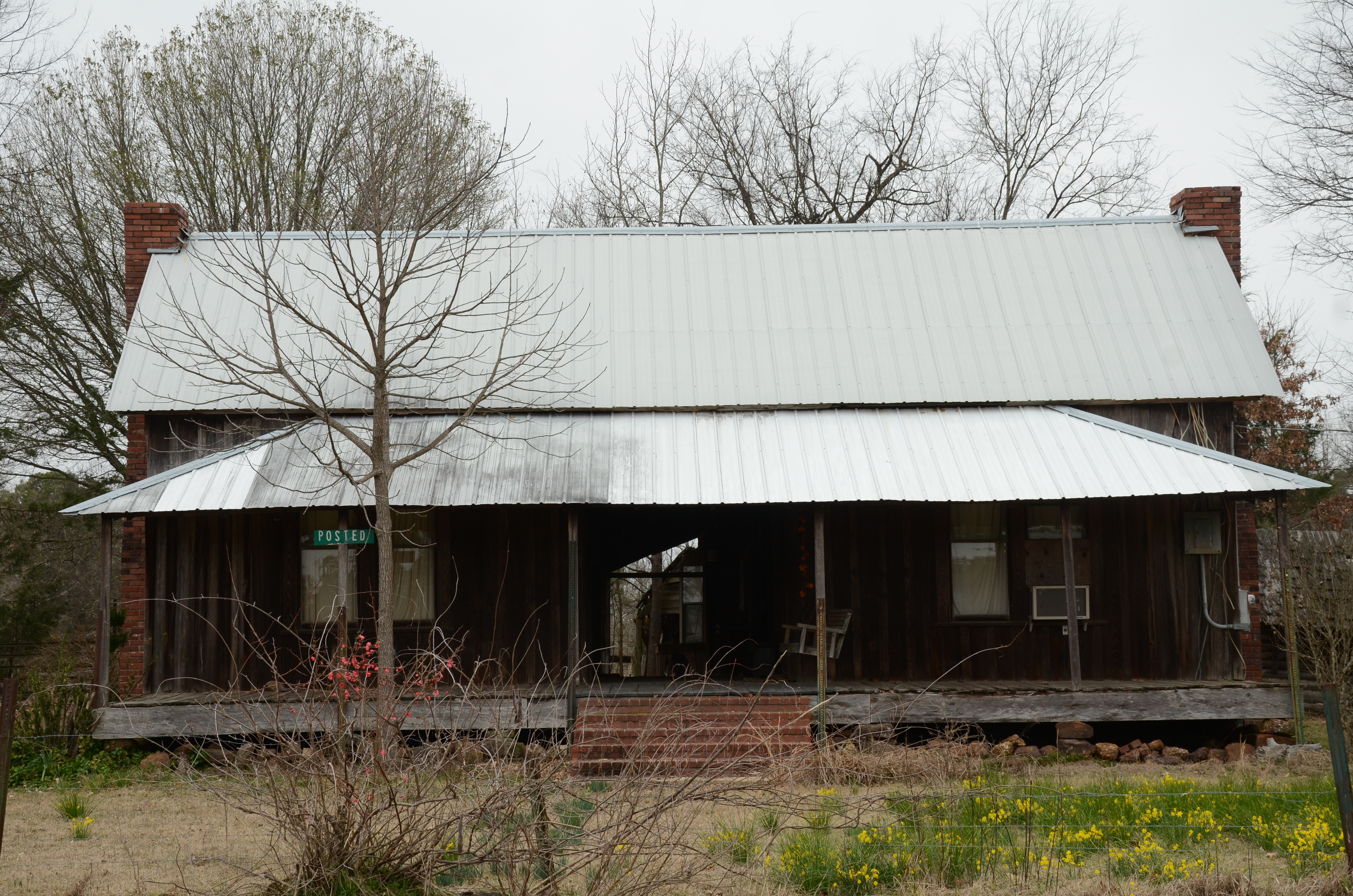
February 2016

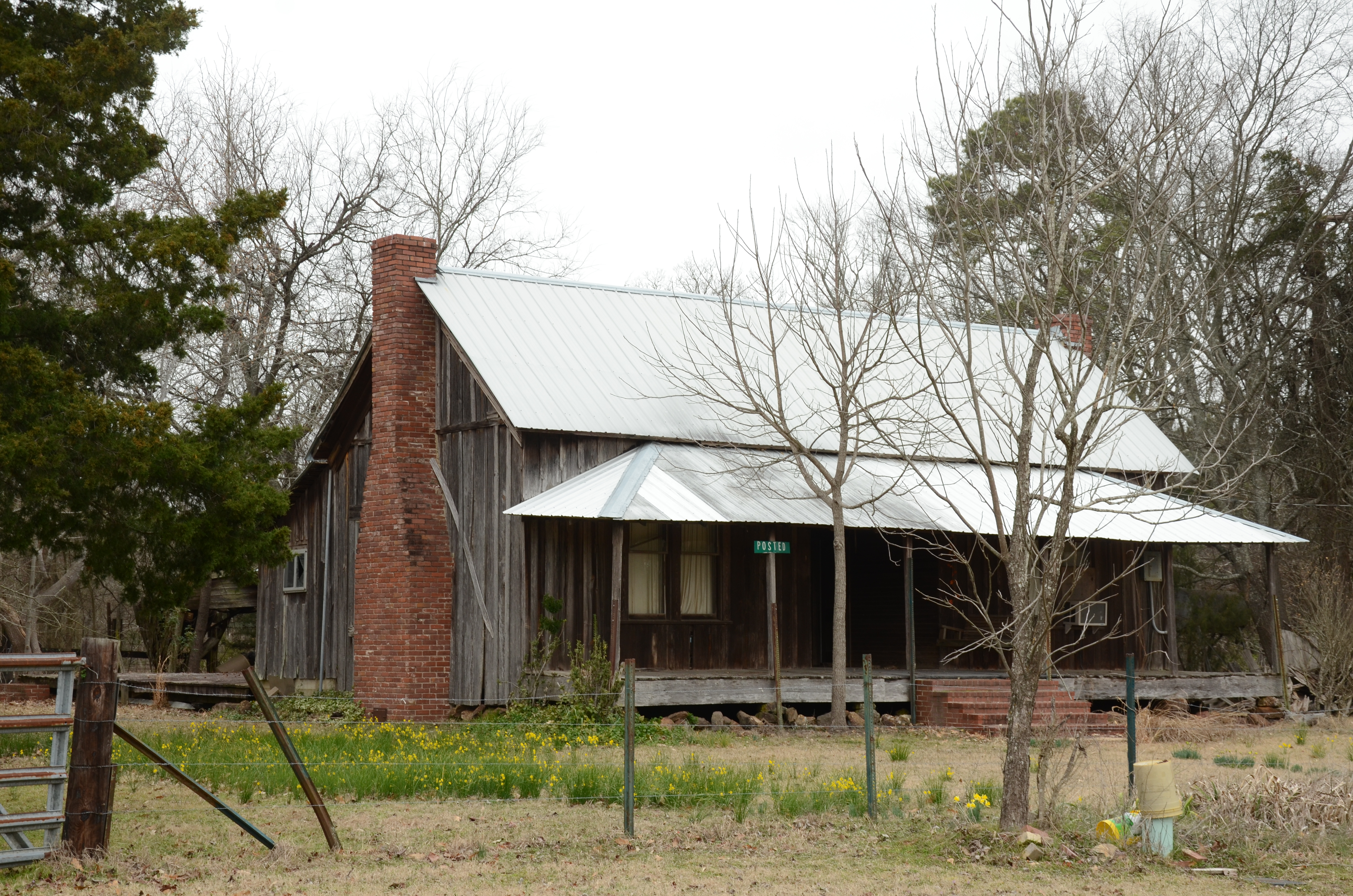
February 2016

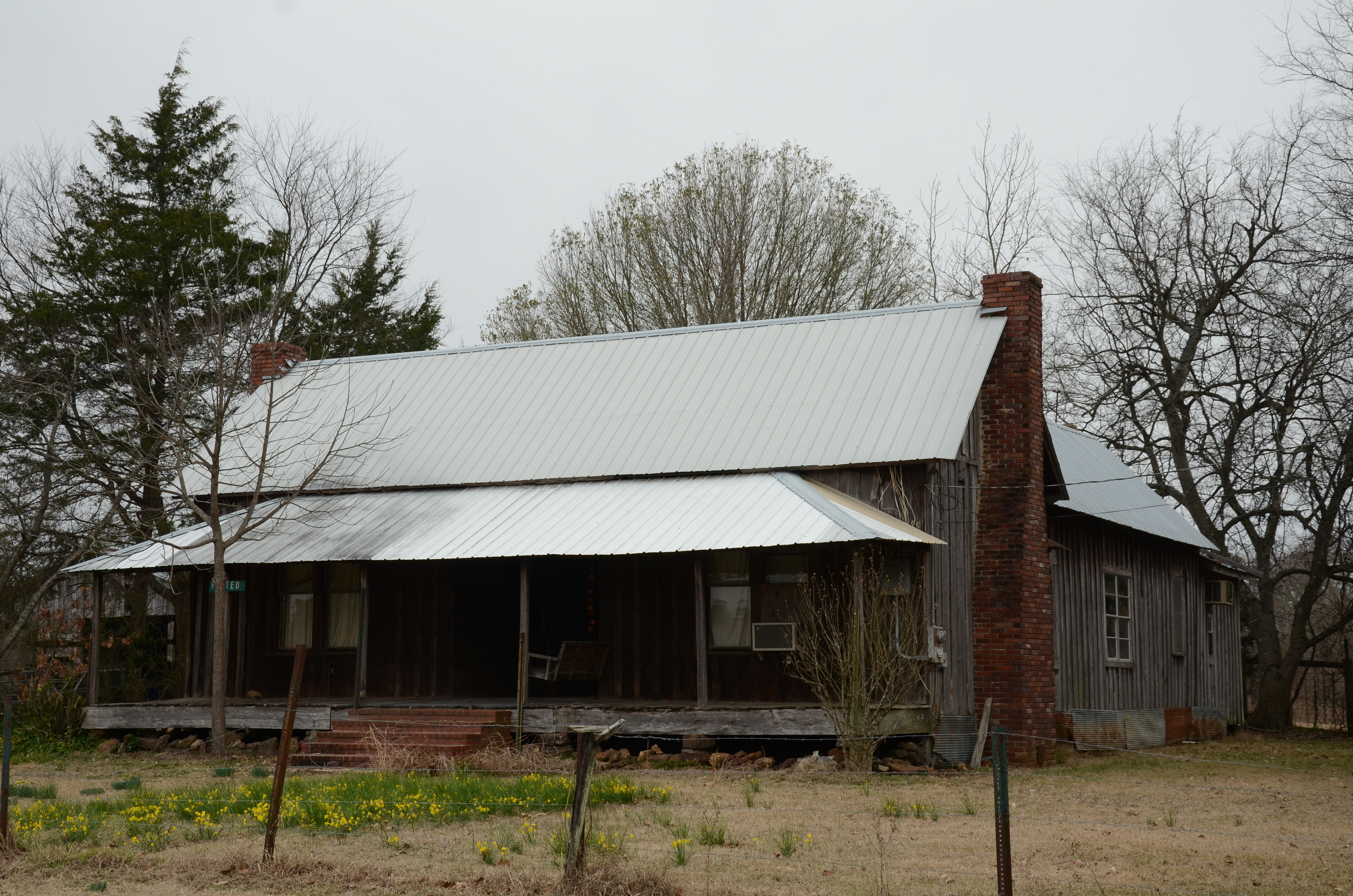
February 2016

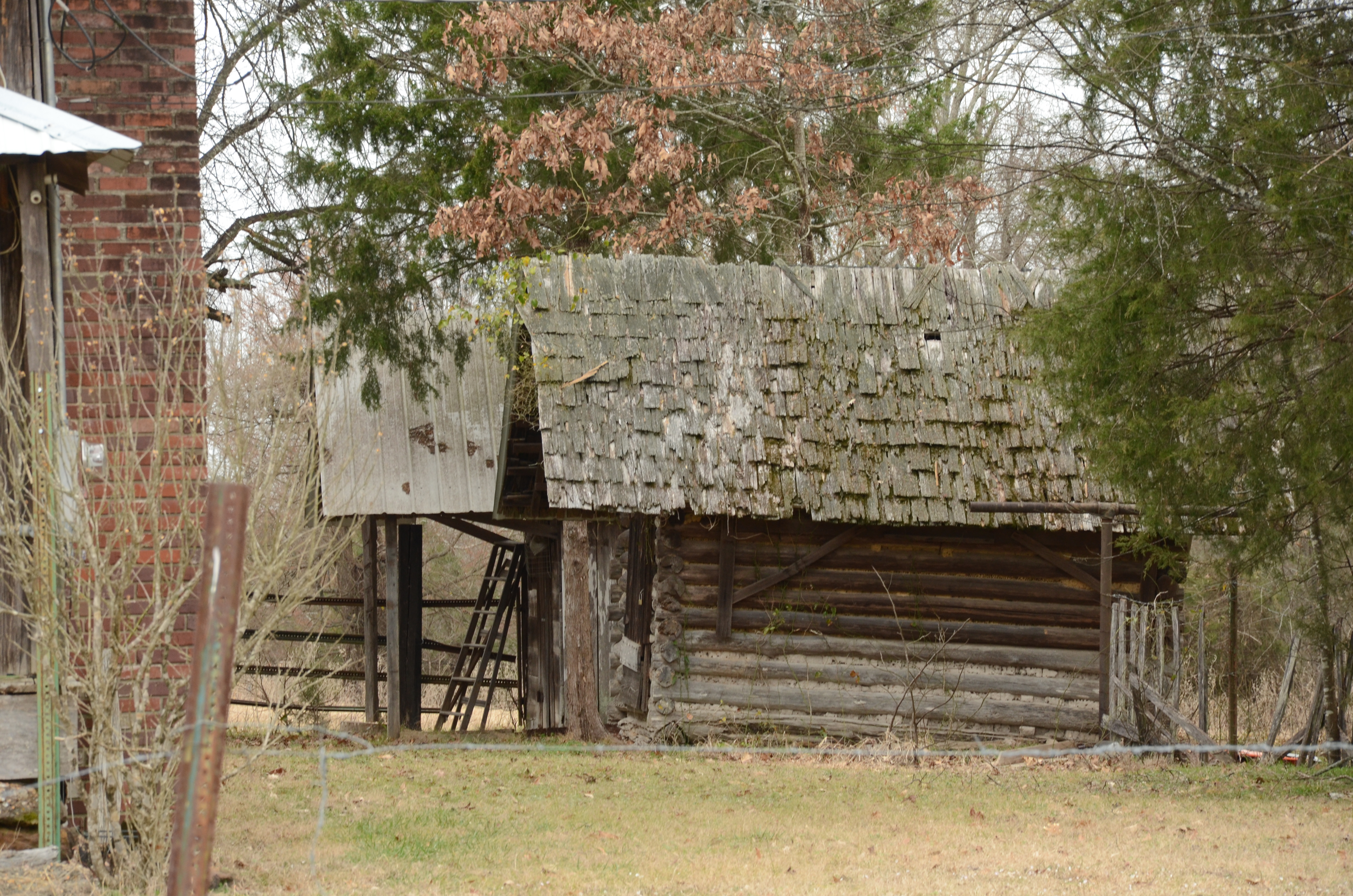
February 2016

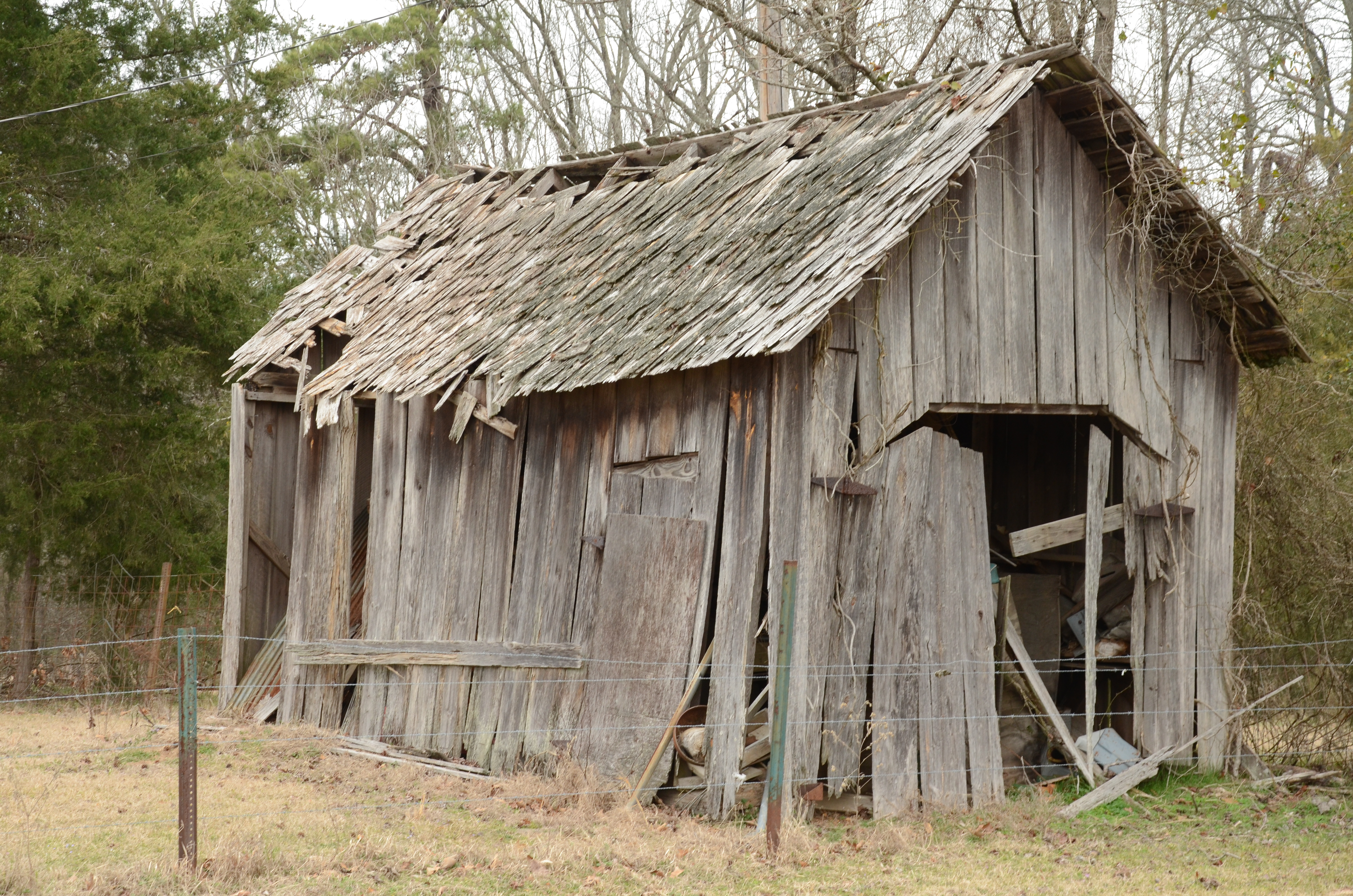
February 2016
