= Fordyce Home Accident Insurance Company =

- Fordyce Home Accident Ins. Co.
- U.S. National Register of Historic Places
- U.S. Historic district – Contributing property
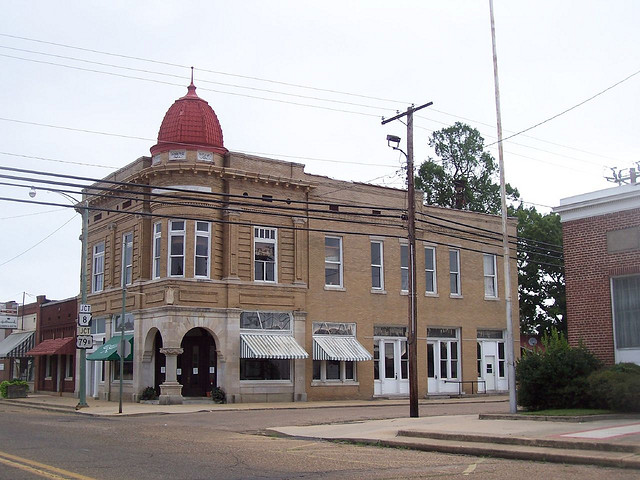
- Fordyce Home Accident Insurance Company, 2007

- Location within Arkansas Location within the United States
- Location: 300 Main, Fordyce, Arkansas
- Coordinates: 33°48′47″N 92°24′43″W
- Area: less than one acre
- Built: 1908
- Architect: Charles L. Thompson
- Architectural style: Classical Revival, Romanesque
- Part of: Fordyce Commercial Historic District (ID92000608)
- MPS: Thompson, Charles L., Design Collection TR
- NRHP reference No.: 82000807

Significant dates
- Added to NRHP: December 22, 1982
- Designated CP: June 11, 1992

The Fordyce Home Accident Ins. Co. is a historic building at 300 North Main Street in downtown Fordyce, Arkansas. It was designed by architect Charles L. Thompson in Classical Revival and Romanesque styles and built in 1908. The two-story building occupies a prominent position in Fordyce's downtown area, standing out because of its corner tower, capped by a terra cotta finial.

The building was listed on the National Register of Historic Places in 1982.

== See also ==
- National Register of Historic Places listings in Dallas County, Arkansas
