= Princeton, Arkansas =

- Census-designated place
- Location within Arkansas Location within the United States
- Coordinates: 33°58′40″N 92°37′33″W
- Country: United States
- State: Arkansas
- County: Dallas
- Township: Princeton
- Elevation: 256 ft (78 m)

Population (2020)
  - Total: 13
- Time zone: UTC-6 (Central (CST))
  - Summer (DST): UTC-5 (CDT)
- Area code: 870
- GNIS feature ID: 2805680

Princeton is an unincorporated community in Princeton Township, Dallas County, Arkansas, United States. The community is located at the junction of Arkansas highways 8 and 9, 7.5 miles (12.1 km) southwest of Carthage. Princeton Cemetery, which is listed on the National Register of Historic Places, is located in the community. was first listed as a CDP in the 2020 census with a population of 13.

== Demographics ==
Historical population
Census	Pop.	Note	%±
2020	13		—
U.S. Decennial Census; 2020

=== 2020 census ===
Princeton CDP, Arkansas – Racial and ethnic composition Note: the US Census treats Hispanic/Latino as an ethnic category. This table excludes Latinos from the racial categories and assigns them to a separate category. Hispanics/Latinos may be of any race.
Race / Ethnicity (NH = Non-Hispanic)	Pop 2020	% 2020
White alone (NH)	9	69.23%
Black or African American alone (NH)	1	7.69%
Native American or Alaska Native alone (NH)	0	0.00%
Asian alone (NH)	0	0.00%
Pacific Islander alone (NH)	0	0.00%
Some Other Race alone (NH)	0	0.00%
Mixed Race or Multi-Racial (NH)	1	7.69%
Hispanic or Latino (any race)	2	15.38%
Total	13	100.00%

== Education ==
It is in the Fordyce School District, which operates Fordyce High School.

== Notable people ==
- Freeman W. Compton, associate justice of the Arkansas Supreme Court (1859–1864, 1866–1868, 1874)
