= Fordyce, Arkansas =

- City
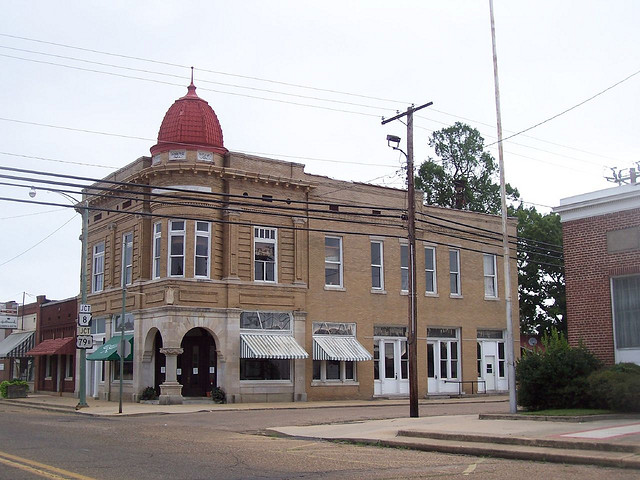
- The historic Fordyce Home Accident Insurance Company building in downtown Fordyce, 2007

- Location of Fordyce in Dallas County, Arkansas.
- Coordinates: 33°49′06″N 92°25′01″W
- Country: United States
- State: Arkansas
- County: Dallas

Area
  - Total: 6.81 sq mi (17.65 km^{2})
  - Land: 6.81 sq mi (17.65 km^{2})
  - Water: 0 sq mi (0.00 km^{2})
- Elevation: 266 ft (81 m)

Population (2020)
  - Total: 3,396
  - Estimate (2025): 3,141 ▼
  - Density: 498.4/sq mi (192.42/km^{2})
- Time zone: UTC−06:00 (Central (CST))
  - Summer (DST): UTC−05:00 (CDT)
- ZIP Code: 71742
- Area code: 870
- FIPS code: 05-24220
- GNIS feature ID: 2403630
- Website: www.cityoffordycear.gov

Fordyce is a city in southeast Dallas County, Arkansas, United States. Its population has been decreasing since the 1980s when the town reached an all-time high of 5,175. The population in 2020 was 3,396, down from 4,300 at the 2010 census, and from 4,799 in 2000.

The city is the county seat, home to the 1911 Dallas County Courthouse.

Within Fordyce, there are 19 sites listed on the National Register of Historic Places, including the Fordyce Home Accident Insurance Company. The town was named for Samuel W. Fordyce.

== History ==
Before European settlement, the area was inhabited by the Caddo people, whose artifacts are occasionally found. The land that became Fordyce was partially cleared before 1850 by W. W. Killabrew, an early settler. In the 1870s, the land was owned by an African American named Henry Atkinson, who sold it to Dr. Algernon Sidney Holderness for $118, who built the first sawmill in town.

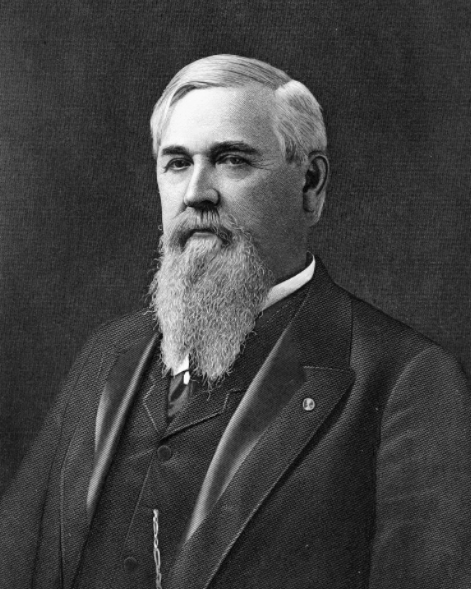
Samuel Wesley Fordyce

The town of Fordyce was named for Samuel Wesley Fordyce. Little construction took place until 1881 when four railroad lines were constructed in Dallas County, one of which was surveyed by Samuel Fordyce. The St. Louis Southwestern Railway Company was completed in 1883 under Fordyce's management, which he operated for 16 years. The rail line called the Cotton Belt Line passed through the town of Fordyce until 1940 when the rail lines were abandoned, and trucks on the roads replaced the trains.

By 1890, Fordyce was the largest town in the county, and on April 8, 1908, it became incorporated and the seat of Dallas County.

The Fordyce Lumber Co. was formed in February 1892 by Charles Warner Gates, John Wenzel Watzek, and Edward Savage Crossett. Within four years of starting the Fordyce Lumber Co., the partners began the Crossett Lumber Co. in 1899. The city of Crossett is named after Edward Savage Crossett. On March 10, 1907, the Chicago, Rock Island and Pacific Railroad (CRI&PR) connected the town of Crossett to Fordyce. The (CRI&PR) allowed timber and lumber to move between the sawmills in Crossett to Fordyce that were owned by Charles Warner Gates, John Wenzel Watzek, and Edward Savage Crossett.

The first high school football team in the state of Arkansas was started in Fordyce in 1904.

On July 5, 1975, The Rolling Stones band members Keith Richards and Ron Wood were arrested in Fordyce for reckless driving, carrying an illegal weapon – a hunting knife – and less than two grams of cocaine said to belong to a passenger in the car. They drank soda pop at the City Hall and called the British Embassy while a crowd gathered outside, but were released some hours later after paying $162.50 in bail, and then they forfeited bond, not appearing on their court date. 31 years later, in 2006, Richards was pardoned for the incident by the governor at the time Mike Huckabee.

On June 21, 2024, a mass shooting at the Mad Butcher grocery store in Fordyce left four people dead and 10 others injured, including two police officers. The shooter was shot by responding police and arrested.

== Geography ==
Fordyce is located in southeastern Dallas County, with the city's southern border following the Calhoun County line. U.S. Routes 79 and 167 bypass the city center to the north and west, while Arkansas Highway 8 passes through the downtown area. US 79 leads northeast 42 miles (68 km) to Pine Bluff and southwest 31 miles (50 km) to Camden, while US 167 leads north 35 miles (56 km) to Sheridan and south 51 miles (82 km) to El Dorado. AR 8 leads southeast 26 miles (42 km) to Warren and northwest 49 miles (79 km) to Arkadelphia.

According to the United States Census Bureau, Fordyce has a total area of 6.8 square miles (17.5 km^{2}), all land.

=== Climate ===
Climate data for Fordyce, Arkansas (1991–2020 normals, extremes 1911–1917, 1936–present)
Month	Jan	Feb	Mar	Apr	May	Jun	Jul	Aug	Sep	Oct	Nov	Dec	Year
Record high °F (°C)	83 (28)	85 (29)	92 (33)	98 (37)	98 (37)	106 (41)	107 (42)	108 (42)	110 (43)	97 (36)	88 (31)	80 (27)	110 (43)
Mean maximum °F (°C)	71.8 (22.1)	75.4 (24.1)	82.0 (27.8)	85.3 (29.6)	89.3 (31.8)	94.1 (34.5)	97.7 (36.5)	98.4 (36.9)	95.1 (35.1)	88.3 (31.3)	79.3 (26.3)	72.6 (22.6)	99.6 (37.6)
Mean daily maximum °F (°C)	52.3 (11.3)	56.8 (13.8)	65.1 (18.4)	73.5 (23.1)	80.5 (26.9)	87.6 (30.9)	91.0 (32.8)	90.9 (32.7)	85.3 (29.6)	75.1 (23.9)	63.2 (17.3)	54.5 (12.5)	73.0 (22.8)
Daily mean °F (°C)	41.6 (5.3)	45.3 (7.4)	53.0 (11.7)	61.2 (16.2)	69.7 (20.9)	77.3 (25.2)	80.7 (27.1)	80.0 (26.7)	73.7 (23.2)	62.4 (16.9)	51.5 (10.8)	43.8 (6.6)	61.7 (16.5)
Mean daily minimum °F (°C)	30.8 (−0.7)	33.7 (0.9)	40.9 (4.9)	49.0 (9.4)	59.0 (15.0)	67.0 (19.4)	70.5 (21.4)	69.2 (20.7)	62.1 (16.7)	49.8 (9.9)	39.9 (4.4)	33.1 (0.6)	50.4 (10.2)
Mean minimum °F (°C)	15.3 (−9.3)	20.2 (−6.6)	24.6 (−4.1)	33.4 (0.8)	44.1 (6.7)	56.8 (13.8)	62.6 (17.0)	60.9 (16.1)	48.1 (8.9)	34.4 (1.3)	24.9 (−3.9)	19.6 (−6.9)	13.5 (−10.3)
Record low °F (°C)	−5 (−21)	−1 (−18)	10 (−12)	26 (−3)	35 (2)	44 (7)	51 (11)	45 (7)	24 (−4)	26 (−3)	14 (−10)	−2 (−19)	−5 (−21)
Average precipitation inches (mm)	4.54 (115)	4.87 (124)	5.83 (148)	5.89 (150)	5.39 (137)	4.18 (106)	4.06 (103)	3.80 (97)	3.60 (91)	5.01 (127)	4.44 (113)	6.02 (153)	57.63 (1,464)
Average snowfall inches (cm)	0.6 (1.5)	0.5 (1.3)	0.1 (0.25)	0.0 (0.0)	0.0 (0.0)	0.0 (0.0)	0.0 (0.0)	0.0 (0.0)	0.0 (0.0)	0.0 (0.0)	0.0 (0.0)	0.0 (0.0)	1.2 (3.0)
Average precipitation days (≥ 0.01 in)	10.9	10.3	10.8	9.7	9.8	7.9	7.8	6.8	6.4	7.4	9.0	10.4	107.2
Average snowy days (≥ 0.1 in)	0.1	0.2	0.0	0.0	0.0	0.0	0.0	0.0	0.0	0.0	0.0	0.0	0.3
Source: NOAA

== Demographics ==
Historical population
Census	Pop.	Note	%±
1890	980		—
1900	1,710		74.5%
1910	2,794		63.4%
1920	2,996		7.2%
1930	3,206		7.0%
1940	3,429		7.0%
1950	3,754		9.5%
1960	3,890		3.6%
1970	4,837		24.3%
1980	5,175		7.0%
1990	4,729		−8.6%
2000	4,799		1.5%
2010	4,300		−10.4%
2020	3,396		−21.0%
2025 (est.)	3,141	▼	−7.5%
U.S. Decennial Census; 2014 Estimate

=== Racial and ethnic composition ===
Fordyce, Arkansas – Racial and ethnic composition Note: the US Census treats Hispanic/Latino as an ethnic category. This table excludes Latinos from the racial categories and assigns them to a separate category. Hispanics/Latinos may be of any race.
Race / Ethnicity (NH = Non-Hispanic)	Pop 2000	Pop 2010	Pop 2020	% 2000	% 2010	% 2020
White alone (NH)	2,315	1,808	1,242	48.24%	42.05%	36.57%
Black or African American alone (NH)	2,379	2,293	1,879	49.57%	53.33%	55.33%
Native American or Alaska Native alone (NH)	9	23	5	0.19%	0.53%	0.15%
Asian alone (NH)	20	10	5	0.42%	0.23%	0.15%
Pacific Islander alone (NH)	0	1	0	0.00%	0.02%	0.00%
Other race alone (NH)	2	6	12	0.04%	0.14%	0.35%
Mixed race or Multiracial (NH)	17	48	135	0.35%	1.12%	3.98%
Hispanic or Latino (any race)	57	111	118	1.19%	2.58%	3.47%
Total	4,799	4,300	3,396	100.00%	100.00%	100.00%

=== 2020 census ===
As of the 2020 census, Fordyce had a population of 3,396 people in 1,382 households, including 808 families. The median age was 40.4 years. 24.2% of residents were under the age of 18 and 20.9% were 65 years of age or older. For every 100 females there were 91.0 males, and for every 100 females age 18 and over there were 85.6 males age 18 and over.

0.0% of residents lived in urban areas, while 100.0% lived in rural areas.

There were 1,382 households in Fordyce, of which 29.1% had children under the age of 18 living in them. Of all households, 34.4% were married-couple households, 19.2% were households with a male householder and no spouse or partner present, and 41.0% were households with a female householder and no spouse or partner present. About 36.1% of all households were made up of individuals and 18.5% had someone living alone who was 65 years of age or older.

There were 1,670 housing units, of which 17.2% were vacant. The homeowner vacancy rate was 2.3% and the rental vacancy rate was 8.9%.

=== 2010 census ===
As of the 2010 United States census, 4,300 people were living in the city. The racial makeup of the city was 53.3% Black, 42.0% White, 0.5% Native American, 0.2% Asian, <0.1% Pacific Islander, 0.1% from some other race, and 1.1% from two or more races. 2.6% were Hispanic or Latino of any race.

=== 2000 census ===
As of the census of 2000, there were 4,799 people, 1,737 households, and 1,186 families living in the city. The population density was 727.8 inhabitants per square mile (281.0/km^{2}). There were 2,024 housing units at an average density of 307 square miles (800 km^{2}). The racial makeup of the city was 48.61% White, 49.66% Black or African American, 0.19% Native American, 0.42% Asian, 0.75% from other races, and 0.38% from two or more races. 1.19% of the population were Hispanic or Latino of any race.

There were 1,737 households, out of which 32.0% had children under the age of 18 living with them, 46.4% were married couples living together, 17.5% had a female householder with no husband present, and 31.7% were non-families. 28.6% of all households were made up of individuals, and 13.4% had someone living alone who was 65 years of age or older. The average household size was 2.51, and the average family size was 3.09.

In the city, the population was spread out, with 28.5% under the age of 18, 8.9% from 18 to 24, 25.3% from 25 to 44, 21.0% from 45 to 64, and 16.3% who were 65 years of age or older. The median age was 36 years. For every 100 females, there were 90.7 males. For every 100 females age 18 and over, there were 87.1 males.

The median income for a household in the city was $23,297, and the median income for a family was $30,120. Males had a median income of $24,971 versus $15,553 for females. The per capita income for the city was $12,118. About 16.2% of families and 22.3% of the population were below the poverty line, including 27.2% of those under age 18 and 19.3% of those age 65 or over.

== Industry ==
Top employers:

- Georgia Pacific Corporation - Plywood Plant (355 employees as of 2008)
- Millcreek of Arkansas (270 employees as of 2008)
- Fordyce School District (197 employees as of 2008)
- Fordyce Picture Frames (160 employees as of 2008)
- International Paper Company (158 employees as of 2008)
- Georgia Pacific Corporation - OSB Plant (130 employees as of 2008)
- Dallas County Nursing Home (95 employees as of 2008)
- First Step, Incorporated (50 employees as of 2008)
- Transitech, Incorporated (50 employees as of 2008)

== Education ==
Public education is provided by the Fordyce School District. The city and surrounding area is served by and elementary, middle and Fordyce High School. The school's athletic teams are the Redbugs.

The town was once segregated with separate public schools; the one for white children was the Fordyce Grammar School, and the school for black children was the J. E. Wallace Elementary School.

== Notable people ==
The town of Fordyce and Dallas County have the highest number of inductees into the Arkansas Sports Hall of Fame in the state.

- Anderson W. Atkinson, U.S. Air Force general
- Jim Benton, pro football star in 1940s
- Paul "Bear" Bryant (1913–83), College Football Hall of Fame coach, attended Fordyce High School But contrary to belief, Coach Bryant was not born in Fordyce, but was born in Moro Bottom.
- Cory Carr (born 1975), American-Israeli basketball player for Israeli team Elitzur Ramla B.C.
- James Hal Cone, theologian
- Scott Hutchins, author
- Raylee Johnson, NFL player, defensive end for the Arkansas Razorbacks and San Diego Chargers
- Larry Lacewell, college football coach and director of scouting for Dallas Cowboys
- Chris McNair, Alabama state legislator and businessman
- Red Parker, college football coach
- Ray Phillips, NFL player, linebacker for Cincinnati Bengals and Philadelphia Eagles
- Ray E. Porter, World War II general who won Purple Heart and Legion of Merit
- John Thach, World War II naval aviator, later promoted to admiral
- Kevin Williams, NFL Pro Bowl defensive tackle for Minnesota Vikings
- W. Randolph "Randy" Woodson, chancellor, North Carolina State University
- Robin F. Wynne, associate justice, Supreme Court of Arkansas
