= Dallas County, Arkansas =

County in Arkansas, United States

- County
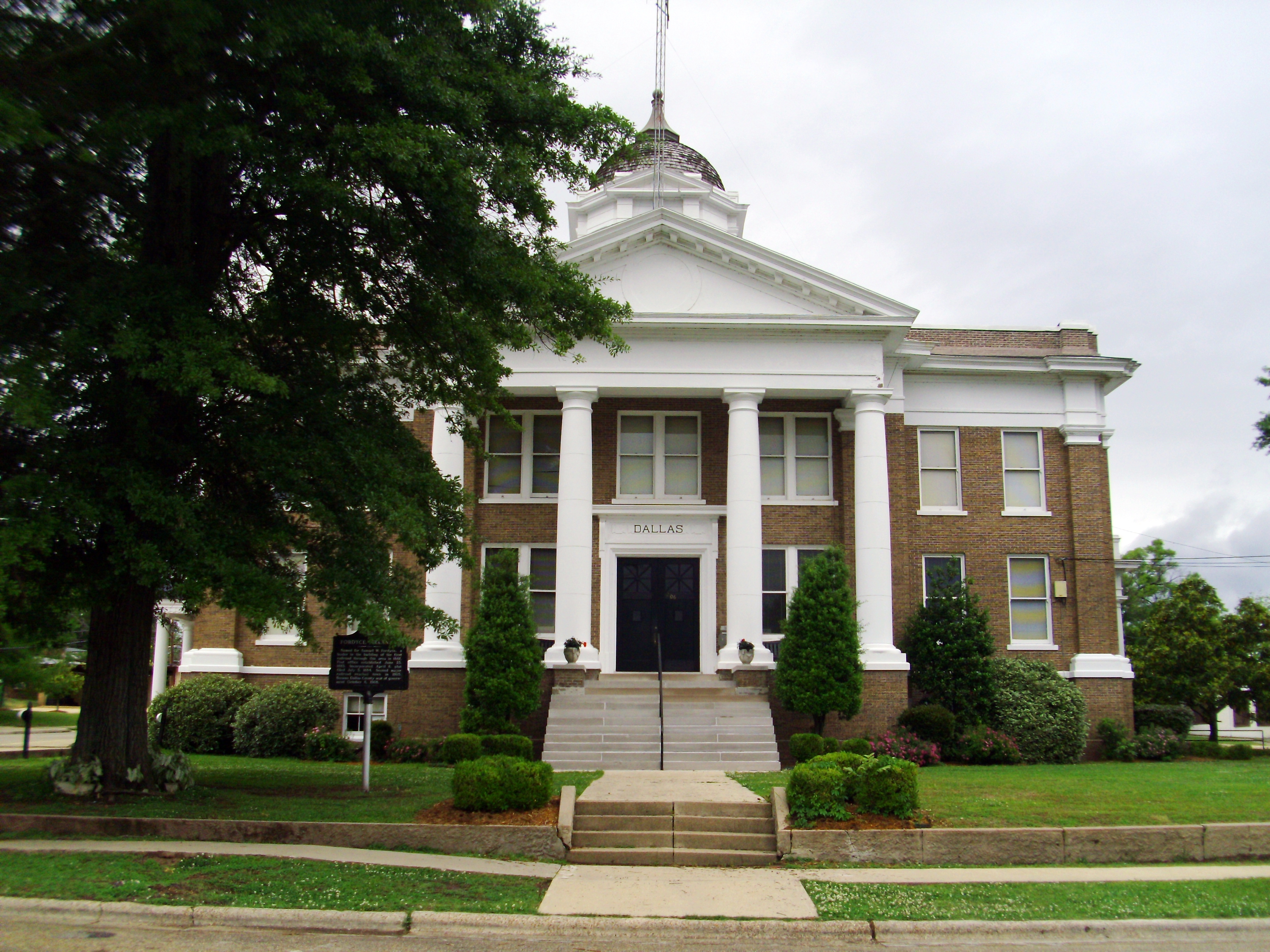
- Courthouse in Fordyce

- Location within the U.S. state of Arkansas
- Coordinates: 33°58′37″N 92°40′23″W
- Country: United States
- State: Arkansas
- Founded: January 1, 1845
- Named for: George M. Dallas
- Seat: Fordyce
- Largest city: Fordyce

Area
  - Total: 668 sq mi (1,730 km^{2})
  - Land: 667 sq mi (1,730 km^{2})
  - Water: 0.7 sq mi (1.8 km^{2}) 0.1%

Population (2020)
  - Total: 6,482
  - Estimate (2025): 6,011 ▼
  - Density: 9.72/sq mi (3.75/km^{2})
- Time zone: UTC−6 (Central)
  - Summer (DST): UTC−5 (CDT)
- Congressional district: 4th
- Website: https://www.arcounties.org/counties/dallas/

Dallas County is a county located in the U.S. state of Arkansas. As of the 2020 census, the population was 6,482, making it the fourth-least populous county in Arkansas. The county seat is Fordyce. Dallas County is Arkansas's 49th county, formed on January 1, 1845; it was named for George M. Dallas, 11th Vice President of the United States.

== Geography ==
According to the U.S. Census Bureau, the county has a total area of 668 square miles (1,730 km^{2}), of which 667 square miles (1,730 km^{2}) is land and 0.7 square miles (1.8 km^{2}) (0.1%) is water.

=== Major highways ===
- U.S. Highway 79
- U.S. Highway 167
- Highway 7
- Highway 8
- Highway 9
- Highway 46
- Highway 48
- Highway 128
- Highway 205
- Highway 207
- Highway 229
- Highway 273
- Highway 274

=== Adjacent counties ===
- Grant County (northeast)
- Cleveland County (east)
- Calhoun County (southeast)
- Ouachita County (southwest)
- Clark County (west)
- Hot Spring County (northwest)

== Demographics ==
Historical population
| Census | Pop. | Note | %± |
|---|---|---|---|
| 1850 | 6,877 | | — |
| 1860 | 8,283 | | 20.4% |
| 1870 | 5,707 | | −31.1% |
| 1880 | 6,505 | | 14.0% |
| 1890 | 9,296 | | 42.9% |
| 1900 | 11,518 | | 23.9% |
| 1910 | 12,621 | | 9.6% |
| 1920 | 14,424 | | 14.3% |
| 1930 | 14,671 | | 1.7% |
| 1940 | 14,471 | | −1.4% |
| 1950 | 12,416 | | −14.2% |
| 1960 | 10,522 | | −15.3% |
| 1970 | 10,022 | | −4.8% |
| 1980 | 10,515 | | 4.9% |
| 1990 | 9,614 | | −8.6% |
| 2000 | 9,210 | | −4.2% |
| 2010 | 8,116 | | −11.9% |
| 2020 | 6,482 | | −20.1% |
| 2025 (est.) | 6,011 | ▼ | −7.3% |
U.S. Decennial Census; 1790–1960 1900–1990; 1990–2000 2010

=== 2020 census ===
As of the 2020 census, the county had a population of 6,482. The median age was 45.5 years. 21.4% of residents were under the age of 18 and 23.4% of residents were 65 years of age or older. For every 100 females there were 94.1 males, and for every 100 females age 18 and over there were 91.3 males age 18 and over.

The racial makeup of the county was 53.8% White, 40.0% Black or African American, 0.3% American Indian and Alaska Native, 0.1% Asian, <0.1% Native Hawaiian and Pacific Islander, 1.6% from some other race, and 4.3% from two or more races. Hispanic or Latino residents of any race comprised 3.1% of the population.

<0.1% of residents lived in urban areas, while 100.0% lived in rural areas.

There were 2,770 households in the county, of which 26.9% had children under the age of 18 living in them. Of all households, 42.3% were married-couple households, 19.8% were households with a male householder and no spouse or partner present, and 33.0% were households with a female householder and no spouse or partner present. About 33.8% of all households were made up of individuals and 16.8% had someone living alone who was 65 years of age or older.

There were 3,468 housing units, of which 20.1% were vacant. Among occupied housing units, 70.1% were owner-occupied and 29.9% were renter-occupied. The homeowner vacancy rate was 1.5% and the rental vacancy rate was 7.1%.

=== 2000 census ===
As of the 2000 census, there were 9,210 people, 3,519 households, and 2,431 families residing in the county. The population density was 14 people per square mile (5.4 people/km^{2}). There were 4,401 housing units at an average density of 7 units per square mile (2.7 units/km^{2}). The racial makeup of the county was 56.96% White, 40.98% Black or African American, 0.24% Native American, 0.23% Asian, 1.01% from other races, and 0.59% from two or more races. 1.92% of the population were Hispanic or Latino of any race.

There were 3,519 households, out of which 29.60% had children under the age of 18 living with them, 51.00% were married couples living together, 13.80% had a female householder with no husband present, and 30.90% were non-families. 28.30% of all households were made up of individuals, and 13.90% had someone living alone who was 65 years of age or older. The average household size was 2.48 and the average family size was 3.03.

In the county, the population was spread out, with 26.20% under the age of 18, 8.30% from 18 to 24, 24.50% from 25 to 44, 24.10% from 45 to 64, and 17.00% who were 65 years of age or older. The median age was 38 years. For every 100 females there were 94.30 males. For every 100 females age 18 and over, there were 91.90 males.

The median income for a household in the county was $26,608, and the median income for a family was $32,630. Males had a median income of $28,538 versus $17,884 for females. The per capita income for the county was $14,610. About 13.30% of families and 18.90% of the population were below the poverty line, including 23.80% of those under age 18 and 20.00% of those age 65 or over.

== Government ==
=== Government ===
The county government is a constitutional body granted specific powers by the Constitution of Arkansas and the Arkansas Code. The quorum court is the legislative branch of the county government and controls all spending and revenue collection. Representatives are called justices of the peace and are elected from county districts every even-numbered year. The number of districts in a county vary from nine to fifteen, and district boundaries are drawn by the county election commission. The Dallas County Quorum Court has nine members. Presiding over quorum court meetings is the county judge, who serves as the chief operating officer of the county. The county judge is elected at-large and does not vote in quorum court business, although capable of vetoing quorum court decisions.

Dallas County, Arkansas Elected countywide officials
| Position | Officeholder | Party |
|---|---|---|
| County Judge | Chris Stanfield | Independent |
| County/Circuit Clerk | Dori Keeton | Republican |
| Sheriff | Mike Knoedl | Republican |
| Treasurer | Louann Clayton | Republican |
| Collector | Crystal Stroud | Republican |
| Assessor | Vanessa Pierce | Republican |
| Coroner | Kevin Kauffman | Republican |

The composition of the Quorum Court following the 2024 elections is 6 Republicans, 2 Democrats, and 1 Independent. Justices of the Peace (members) of the Quorum Court following the elections are:

- District 1: Wornest Lambert (D)
- District 2: Loretta Cotton (D)
- District 3: Edith Totty (I)
- District 4: Tracy Scott Graves (R)
- District 5: Todd Roark (R)
- District 6: John Andrew Johnson (R)
- District 7: David A. Fite (R)
- District 8: Robert Seale (R)
- District 9: Donny Ford (R)

Additionally, the townships of Dallas County are entitled to elect their own respective constables, as set forth by the Constitution of Arkansas. Constables are largely of historical significance as they were used to keep the peace in rural areas when travel was more difficult. The township constables as of the 2024 elections are:

- District 8: Brady Harmon (R)
- District 9: Kenneth Workman (D)

=== Politics ===
Prior to 2004, this county was considered an "ancestral" Democratic county, where Democrats won every presidential race with exceptions for the 1968 campaign of George Wallace and the 1972 and 1984 landslides of Richard Nixon and Ronald Reagan, respectively. Former Governor Bill Clinton won this county twice in his presidential runs: 1992 and 1996. Al Gore won this county in 2000, the most recent Democrat to do so.

United States presidential election results for Dallas County, Arkansas
| Year | Republican | | Democratic | | Third party(ies) | |
| Year | No. | % | No. | % | No. | % |
|---|---|---|---|---|---|---|
| 1896 | 479 | 31.55% | 1,032 | 67.98% | 7 | 0.46% |
| 1900 | 514 | 40.35% | 746 | 58.56% | 14 | 1.10% |
| 1904 | 496 | 43.06% | 604 | 52.43% | 52 | 4.51% |
| 1908 | 636 | 44.26% | 721 | 50.17% | 80 | 5.57% |
| 1912 | 228 | 17.33% | 654 | 49.70% | 434 | 32.98% |
| 1916 | 527 | 31.43% | 1,150 | 68.57% | 0 | 0.00% |
| 1920 | 659 | 36.19% | 1,140 | 62.60% | 22 | 1.21% |
| 1924 | 401 | 26.68% | 1,068 | 71.06% | 34 | 2.26% |
| 1928 | 503 | 32.73% | 1,030 | 67.01% | 4 | 0.26% |
| 1932 | 150 | 6.53% | 2,139 | 93.16% | 7 | 0.30% |
| 1936 | 103 | 6.71% | 1,433 | 93.29% | 0 | 0.00% |
| 1940 | 118 | 8.04% | 1,295 | 88.28% | 54 | 3.68% |
| 1944 | 266 | 17.65% | 1,238 | 82.15% | 3 | 0.20% |
| 1948 | 152 | 8.93% | 1,174 | 68.98% | 376 | 22.09% |
| 1952 | 737 | 25.03% | 2,202 | 74.80% | 5 | 0.17% |
| 1956 | 984 | 35.63% | 1,726 | 62.49% | 52 | 1.88% |
| 1960 | 659 | 25.20% | 1,639 | 62.68% | 317 | 12.12% |
| 1964 | 1,625 | 47.14% | 1,779 | 51.61% | 43 | 1.25% |
| 1968 | 672 | 18.43% | 1,253 | 34.36% | 1,722 | 47.22% |
| 1972 | 2,152 | 60.55% | 1,402 | 39.45% | 0 | 0.00% |
| 1976 | 1,012 | 23.61% | 3,266 | 76.20% | 8 | 0.19% |
| 1980 | 1,596 | 35.16% | 2,838 | 62.52% | 105 | 2.31% |
| 1984 | 2,361 | 52.80% | 2,035 | 45.51% | 76 | 1.70% |
| 1988 | 1,947 | 49.19% | 1,990 | 50.28% | 21 | 0.53% |
| 1992 | 1,458 | 37.15% | 2,107 | 53.68% | 360 | 9.17% |
| 1996 | 1,041 | 30.31% | 2,118 | 61.66% | 276 | 8.03% |
| 2000 | 1,571 | 47.25% | 1,710 | 51.43% | 44 | 1.32% |
| 2004 | 1,700 | 50.18% | 1,671 | 49.32% | 17 | 0.50% |
| 2008 | 1,757 | 52.95% | 1,471 | 44.33% | 90 | 2.71% |
| 2012 | 1,665 | 53.99% | 1,337 | 43.35% | 82 | 2.66% |
| 2016 | 1,509 | 54.46% | 1,165 | 42.04% | 97 | 3.50% |
| 2020 | 1,573 | 59.38% | 963 | 36.35% | 113 | 4.27% |
| 2024 | 1,482 | 63.77% | 798 | 34.34% | 44 | 1.89% |

=== Townships ===
Townships in Arkansas are the divisions of a county. Each township includes unincorporated areas; some may have incorporated cities or towns within part of their boundaries. Arkansas townships have limited purposes in modern times. However, the United States census does list Arkansas population based on townships (sometimes referred to as "county subdivisions" or "minor civil divisions"). Townships are also of value for historical purposes in terms of genealogical research. Each town or city is within one or more townships in an Arkansas county based on census maps and publications. The townships of Dallas County are listed below; listed in parentheses are the cities, towns, and/or census-designated places that are fully or partially inside the township.

- Bunn
- Chester (Carthage)
- Dry Run (part of Fordyce)
- Fordyce (most of Fordyce)
- Holly Springs
- Jackson
- Liberty
- Manchester
- Manning
- Nix
- Owen (Sparkman)
- Princeton
- Smith
- Southall
- Willow

== Communities ==
=== Cities ===
- Carthage
- Fordyce (county seat)
- Sparkman

=== Census-designated places ===
- Ivan
- Princeton

=== Unincorporated communities ===
- Manning
- Tulip
- Bucksnort

== See also ==
- National Register of Historic Places listings in Dallas County, Arkansas
