= National Register of Historic Places listings in Hot Spring County, Arkansas =

Location of Hot Spring County in Arkansas

This is a list of the National Register of Historic Places listings in Hot Spring County, Arkansas.

This is intended to be a complete list of the properties and districts on the National Register of Historic Places in Hot Spring County, Arkansas, United States. The locations of National Register properties and districts for which the latitude and longitude coordinates are included below, may be seen in a map.

There are 31 properties and districts listed on the National Register in the county.

Contents: Counties in Arkansas
- Arkansas
- Ashley
- Baxter
- Benton
- Boone
- Bradley
- Calhoun
- Carroll
- Chicot
- Clark
- Clay
- Cleburne
- Cleveland
- Columbia
- Conway
- Craighead
- Crawford
- Crittenden
- Cross
- Dallas
- Desha
- Drew
- Faulkner
- Franklin
- Fulton
- Garland
- Grant
- Greene
- Hempstead
- Hot Spring
- Howard
- Independence
- Izard
- Jackson
- Jefferson
- Johnson
- Lafayette
- Lawrence
- Lee
- Lincoln
- Little River
- Logan
- Lonoke
- Madison
- Marion
- Miller
- Mississippi
- Monroe
- Montgomery
- Nevada
- Newton
- Ouachita
- Perry
- Phillips
- Pike
- Poinsett
- Polk
- Pope
- Prairie
- Pulaski (Little Rock)
- Randolph
- St. Francis
- Saline
- Scott
- Searcy
- Sebastian
- Sevier
- Sharp
- Stone
- Union
- Van Buren
- Washington
- White
- Woodruff
- Yell

This National Park Service list is complete through NPS recent listings posted May 1, 2026.

== Current listings ==
	Name on the Register	Image	Date listed	Location	City or town	Description
1	Alderson-Coston House	Alderson-Coston House	May 26, 1995 (#95000657)	204 Pine Bluff St. 34°21′43″N 92°48′33″W	Malvern	
2	Bank of Malvern	Bank of Malvern	March 13, 1987 (#87000425)	212 S. Main St. 34°21′48″N 92°48′49″W	Malvern	
3	Billings-Cole House	Billings-Cole House	May 27, 2015 (#15000283)	725 E. Page Ave. 34°21′48″N 92°48′12″W	Malvern	
4	Blakely House	Blakely House	May 3, 1976 (#76002142)	West of Social Hill on Highway 84; 34°20′06″N 93°01′32″W	Social Hill	
5	Cabin No. 1	Cabin No. 1	April 20, 1995 (#95000455)	Cabin area access road at Lake Catherine State Park; 34°26′15″N 92°54′46″W	Shorewood Hills	
6	Clark House	Clark House	December 22, 1982 (#82000828)	1324 S. Main St. 34°21′24″N 92°48′30″W	Malvern	
7	Couchwood	Couchwood	December 4, 1986 (#86003582)	On the grounds of the Couchwood estate, 601 Couchwood Rd. 34°26′47″N 92°54′50″W	Shorewood Hills	Extends into Garland County; listing encompasses artwork of Dionicio Rodriguez on the private estate of Harvey C. Couch.
8	Couchwood Historic District	Couchwood Historic District	May 17, 2001 (#01000487)	601 Couchwood Rd. 34°26′50″N 92°54′50″W	Hot Springs	Extends into Garland County; listing encompasses buildings and structures of the private estate of Harvey C. Couch.
9	Garrett's Grocery Store	Garrett's Grocery Store	January 19, 2023 (#100008561)	2450 US 67; 34°13′24″N 93°00′10″W	Friendship	
10	Gatewood House	Gatewood House	July 24, 1992 (#92000928)	235 Pine Bluff St. 34°21′41″N 92°48′30″W	Malvern	
11	Hodges House	Hodges House	June 2, 1995 (#95000683)	Highway 7; 34°16′23″N 93°08′53″W	Bismarck	
12	Hot Spring County Courthouse	Hot Spring County Courthouse	November 7, 1996 (#96001271)	210 Locust St. 34°21′46″N 92°48′53″W	Malvern	
13	Hot Springs Railroad Roundhouse	Hot Springs Railroad Roundhouse	May 29, 2003 (#03000462)	132 Front St. 34°21′53″N 92°48′59″W	Malvern	
14	Jones Mill Site (3HS28)		September 12, 1988 (#87001385)	Address Restricted	Jones Mill	
15	L' Eau Frais Creek Bridge		January 8, 2025 (#100011291)	L'Eau Fraiz Road over L'Eau Frais Creek. 34°13′41″N 92°48′40″W	Malvern vicinity	
16	Lake Catherine Quarry		September 11, 1975 (#75000388)	Address Restricted	Malvern	
17	Lake Catherine State Park-Bridge No. 2	Lake Catherine State Park-Bridge No. 2	May 28, 1992 (#92000528)	Highway 171 west of Slunger Creek in Lake Catherine State Park; 34°25′46″N 92°56′21″W	Shorewood Hills	
18	Lake Catherine State Park-Cabin No. 2	Lake Catherine State Park-Cabin No. 2	May 28, 1992 (#92000526)	Cabin area access road in Lake Catherine State Park; 34°26′15″N 92°54′45″W	Shorewood Hills	
19	Lake Catherine State Park-Cabin No. 3	Lake Catherine State Park-Cabin No. 3	May 28, 1992 (#92000527)	Cabin area access road in Lake Catherine State Park; 34°26′15″N 92°54′44″W	Shorewood Hills	
20	Lake Catherine State Park-Nature Cabin	Lake Catherine State Park-Nature Cabin	May 28, 1992 (#92000535)	Camping area access road in Lake Catherine State Park; 34°26′15″N 92°55′03″W	Shorewood Hills	
21	Lake Catherine State Park Prisoner of War Structures	Lake Catherine State Park Prisoner of War Structures	January 24, 2017 (#100000553)	Campground, Lake Catherine State Park; 34°26′15″N 92°55′05″W	Hot Springs vicinity	Stone retaining wall and outdoor oven built in part by CCC and in part by German POW labor
22	Lawyers' Row Historic District	Lawyers' Row Historic District	September 28, 2015 (#15000625)	118, 120, 130, 132 W. 2nd St. 34°21′49″N 92°48′53″W	Malvern	
23	Lono Gymnasium	Lono Gymnasium	January 21, 2020 (#100004896)	11702 AR 222; 34°12′30″N 92°42′30″W	Lono	
24	Malvern Commercial Historic District	Malvern Commercial Historic District	September 28, 2015 (#15000626)	Bounded by W. 1st., S. Main, W. 5th & Locust Sts. 34°21′46″N 92°48′50″W	Malvern	
25	Malvern Rosenwald School	Malvern Rosenwald School	September 28, 2005 (#05001075)	836 Acme St. 34°21′45″N 92°49′18″W	Malvern	
26	Missouri-Pacific Railroad Depot-Malvern	Missouri-Pacific Railroad Depot-Malvern	June 11, 1992 (#92000615)	1st St. 34°21′56″N 92°48′49″W	Malvern	
27	Morrison Plantation Smokehouse		December 28, 1977 (#77000254)	Off Interstate 30; 34°16′12″N 92°56′50″W	Saginaw	
28	Pine Bluff Street Historic District	Pine Bluff Street Historic District	February 16, 1999 (#99000154)	Pine Bluff St., roughly from Bois D'Arc to McNeal St. 34°21′42″N 92°48′17″W	Malvern	
29	Remmel Dam	Remmel Dam	September 4, 1992 (#92001084)	Remmel Dam Rd. 34°25′37″N 92°53′38″W	Jones Mill	
30	Rockport Cemetery	Rockport Cemetery	January 28, 2002 (#01001527)	U.S. Route 270; 34°22′48″N 92°49′57″W	Rockport	
31	Strauss House	Strauss House	December 22, 1982 (#82000830)	528 E. Page St. 34°21′50″N 92°48′26″W	Malvern	

== Former listings ==
	Name on the Register	Image	Date listed	Date removed	Location	City or town	Description
1	Bethel African Methodist Episcopal Church		May 26, 2004 (#04000496)	June 12, 2013	519 West Page Street; 34°21′35″N 92°48′58″W	Malvern	
2	Burks Service Station		June 9, 2000 (#00000630)	October 18, 2002	Jct. of Page Ave. and Sullenberger	Malvern	Demolished in 2001
3	Old Rockport Bridge		October 7, 1982 (#82000829)	August 11, 1999	W of Rockport across Ouachita River	Rockport vicinity	Damaged by flooding in 1987, completely destroyed by another flood in 1990.

== See also ==
- List of National Historic Landmarks in Arkansas
- National Register of Historic Places listings in Arkansas
