= Hell's Half Acre =

Hell's Half Acre, Hell's Half-Acre, Hell's Half-acre, or Hell's Halfacre may refer to:

== Places ==
=== Communities ===
- Half Acre, Alabama, originally known as Hell's Half Acre, a community in Marengo County
- Hells Halfacre, Kentucky, a community in Harrison County
- Hell's Half Acre, a former historic area in Downtown Los Angeles, California, known for crime and prostitution

=== Geologic features ===
- Hell's Half Acre, a side slot canyon in Aravaipa Canyon, Arizona
- Hell's Half Acre (Hot Springs, Arkansas), a talus hillside on Indian Mountain near Hot Springs, Arkansas
- Hell's Half Acre Lava Field, a basaltic lava field on the Snake River Plain, Idaho
- Hell's Half Acre, the rapids immediately upstream of the American side of Niagara Falls
- Hell's Half Acre (Wyoming), a unique escarpment in Natrona County, Wyoming
- Hell's Half Acre, old name for Midway Geyser Basin, one of the Geothermal areas of Yellowstone National Park

=== Historic ===
- A corner of Chinatown, Honolulu, Hawaii, and setting of the 1954 film noir by the same name
- A red light district in late 19th-century Omaha, Nebraska; also called Burnt District
- A battlefield during the 1863 Civil War Battle of Stones River, Tennessee
- A notorious section of Nashville, Tennessee in the late 1800s
- Hell's Half Acre (Fort Worth), a former saloon district in the early days of Fort Worth, Texas
- An area of slave trading and jails in the 1800s, including Lumpkin's jail, Richmond, Virginia

== Film ==
- Hell's Half Acre (1954 film), a 1954 film noir
- Hell's Half Acre (2006 film), a 2006 horror film

== Literature ==
- Hell's Half Acre (novel), a novel by Will Christopher Baer
- Hell's Half Acre, a novel in the Walker, Texas Ranger series by James Reasoner

== Music ==
- Hell's Half Acre, name of William Control's recording studio
- Hell's Half Acre (album), a 1996 album by Jolene
- Hell's Half Acre (song), a song on the 1987 album Robbie Robertson

== Sports ==
- Hell's Half Acre, a nickname for Amon G. Carter Stadium, Texas Christian University, Fort Worth, Texas

== See also ==
- Hell's Hundred Acres
- Devil's Half-Acre (disambiguation)
