= Shorewood Hills =

Shorewood Hills may refer to:

- Shorewood Hills, Arkansas
- Shorewood Hills, Wisconsin
