= Lake Catherine State Park Prisoner of War Structures =

- U.S. National Register of Historic Places
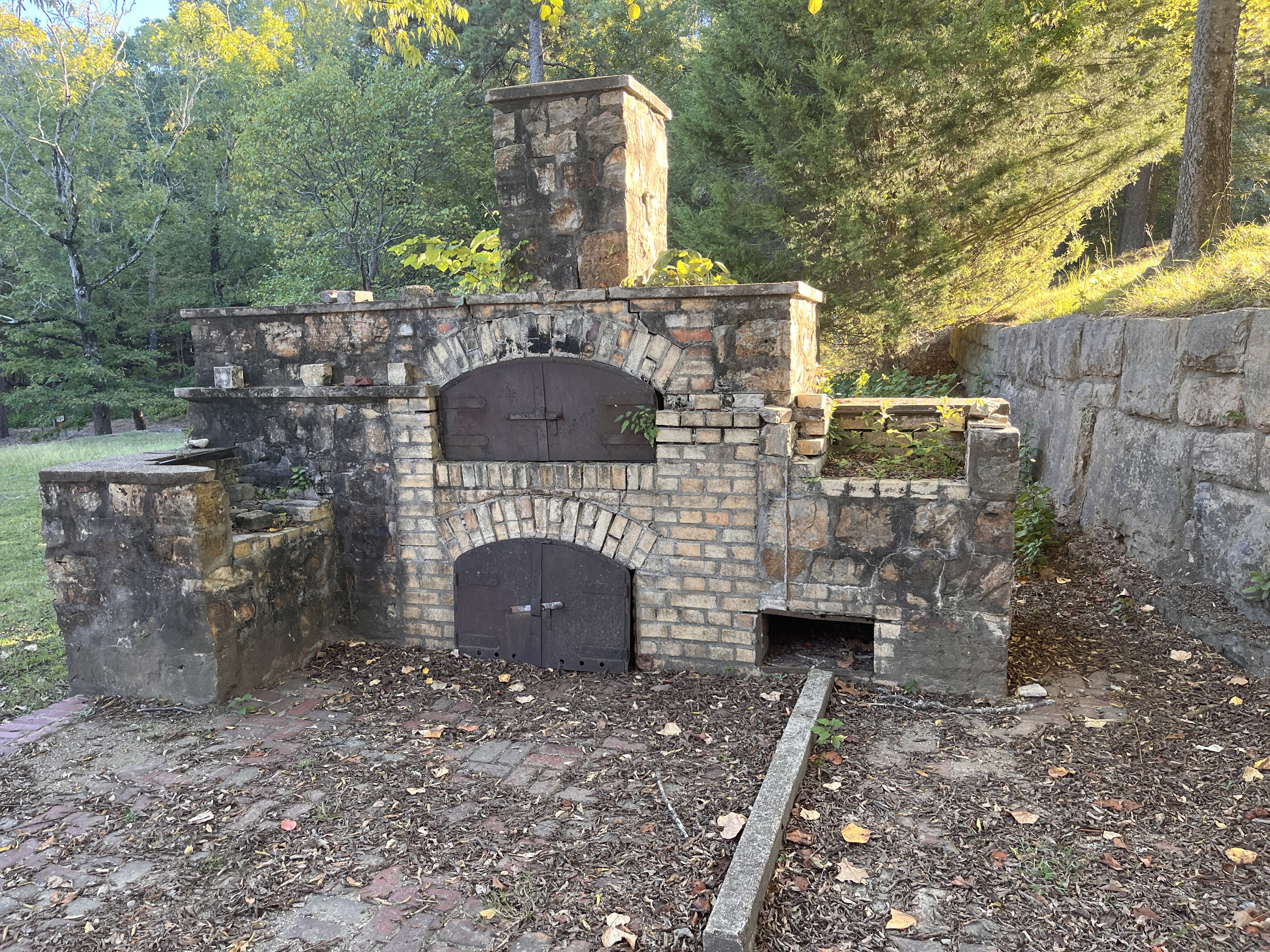

- Location within Arkansas Location within the United States
- Location: Campground, Lake Catherine State Park, Hot Spring County, Arkansas
- Coordinates: 34°26′15″N 92°55′5″W
- Area: less than one acre
- Built: 1942
- Built by: Civilian Conservation Corps; German POWs
- Architectural style: Rustic Resort
- MPS: Facilities Constructed by the CCC in Arkansas MPS
- NRHP reference No.: 10000553
- Added to NRHP: January 24, 2017

The Lake Catherine State Park Prisoner of War Structures are two structures in the campground area of Lake Catherine State Park in Hot Spring County, Arkansas. One is a stone retaining wall, about 210 feet (64 m) long and 9 feet (2.7 m) tall, built out of native stone on a concrete foundation. It is laid out in a zig-zag pattern just south of the campground's main waterfront building, and is oriented with its faces generally directed eastward to the water. The other is an outdoor cooking area (barbecue pit), also built of stone, located a short way west of the wall. Construction of both of these structures was begun in 1942 by crews of the Civilian Conservation Corps, but was interrupted when work ceased due to World War II. Both were then later completed by German prisoners of war who were housed nearby. They are believed to be unique in the state for this construction history.

The structures were listed on the National Register of Historic Places in 1992.

== See also ==
- Lake Catherine State Park CCC Cabins
- National Register of Historic Places listings in Hot Spring County, Arkansas
