= Morrison Plantation Smokehouse =

- U.S. National Register of Historic Places
- Location within Arkansas Location within the United States
- Nearest city: Saginaw, Arkansas
- Coordinates: 34°16′12″N 92°56′50″W
- Area: less than one acre
- Built: 1854
- NRHP reference No.: 77000254
- Added to NRHP: December 28, 1977

The Morrison Plantation Smokehouse is a historic plantation outbuilding in rural Hot Spring County, Arkansas. Located off County Road 15 near Saginaw, it is the last surviving remnant of a once-extensive forced labor camp. It was built about 1854, probably by the forced labor of enslaved people, on the plantation of Daniel Morrison.

It is a hexagonal structure, built out of dry laid fieldstone, and capped with a hip roof that has a gabled venting cupola at the top.

The building was listed on the National Register of Historic Places in 1977.

== See also ==
- National Register of Historic Places listings in Hot Spring County, Arkansas
