= Lake Catherine State Park-Bridge No. 2 =

- U.S. National Register of Historic Places
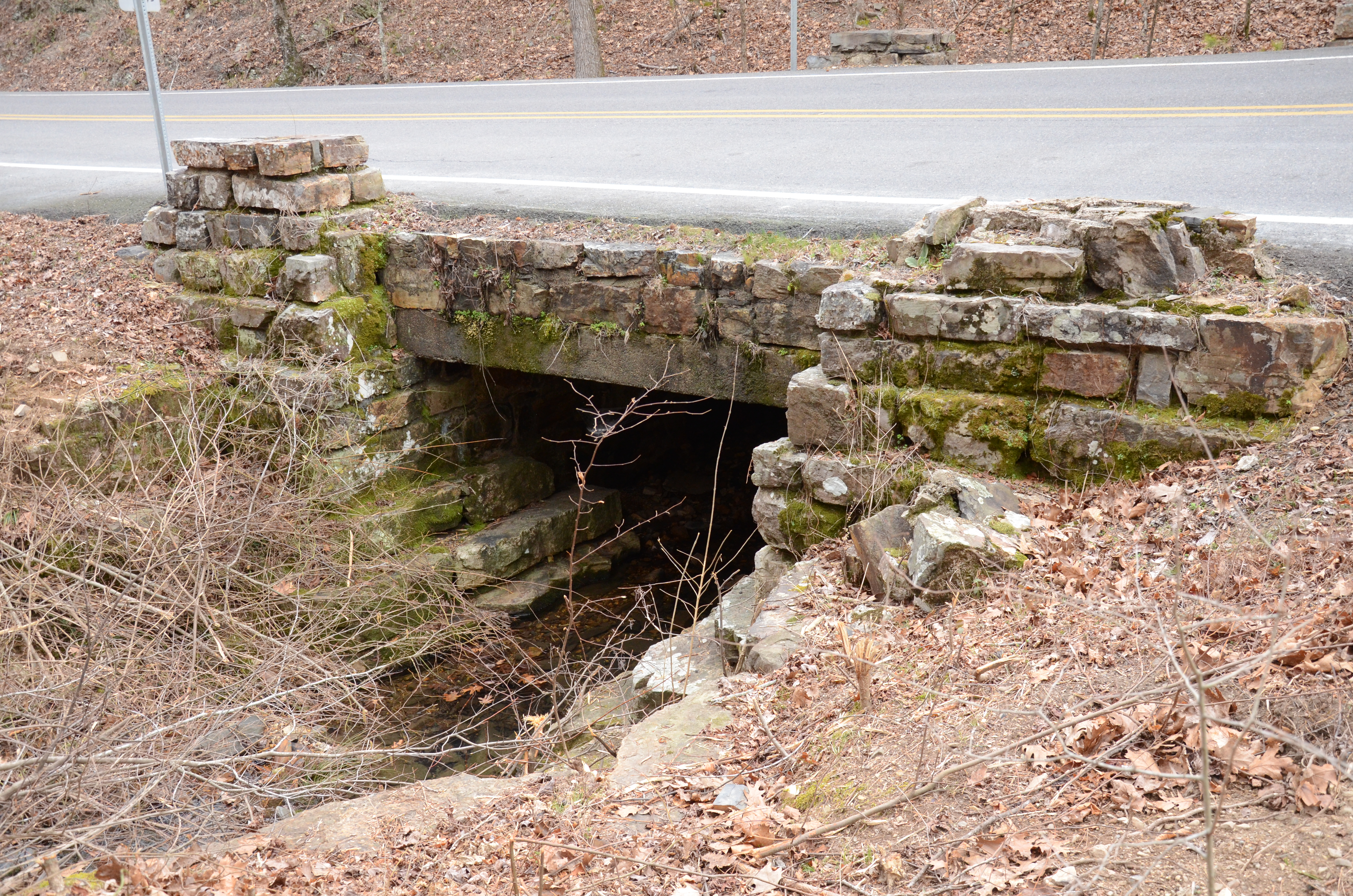

- Location within Arkansas Location within the United States
- Nearest city: Shorewood Hills, Arkansas
- Coordinates: 34°25′46″N 92°56′21″W
- Area: less than one acre
- Built: 1935
- Built by: Civilian Conservation Corps
- Architectural style: Rustic Resort
- MPS: Facilities Constructed by the CCC in Arkansas MPS
- NRHP reference No.: 92000528
- Added to NRHP: May 28, 1992

The Lake Catherine State Park-Bridge No. 2 is a historic bridge, carrying Arkansas Highway 171 across an unnamed stream in the western part of Lake Catherine State Park in Hot Spring County, Arkansas. The bridge is a rustic stone structure, with stone abutments rising to low piers just above the roadway at its four corners. Built in 1935 by crews of the Civilian Conservation Corps, it is one of a number of surviving CCC-built structures in the park.

The bridge was listed on the National Register of Historic Places in 1992.

== See also ==
- Lake Catherine State Park CCC Cabins
- List of bridges documented by the Historic American Engineering Record in Arkansas
- List of bridges on the National Register of Historic Places in Arkansas
- National Register of Historic Places listings in Hot Spring County, Arkansas
