= Blakely House =

Blakely House may refer to:

- Blakely House (Social Hill, Arkansas), listed on the NRHP in Arkansas
- Ross H. Blakely House, Kingman, AZ, listed on the NRHP in Arizona
