= Crip Hall =

American politician

24th Secretary of State of Arkansas
- In office 1937 – January 14, 1961
- Governor: Carl E. Bailey; Homer M. Adkins; Benjamin T. Laney; Sid McMath; Francis A. Cherry; Orval E. Faubus
- Preceded by: Ed F. McDonald
- Succeeded by: Nancy J. Hall

Personal details
- Born: October 8, 1901 Social Hill, Arkansas
- Died: January 14, 1961 (aged 59)
- Resting place: Roselawn Memorial Park; Little Rock, Arkansas
- Spouse: Nancy J. Hall
- Children: Nancy Anne Hall
- Education: University of Arkansas; Arkansas Law School
- Profession: Lawyer, politician
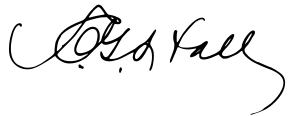
- Signature

Claris Gustavius "Crip" Hall (October 8, 1901 – January 14, 1961) was a noted lawyer and politician who served as the Secretary of State of Arkansas for 25 years. He took the nickname "Crip" following a lifelong handicap caused by a childhood case of polio.

== Early life and education ==
Hall was born on October 8, 1901, in Social Hill, Arkansas, an unincorporated community near Malvern, Arkansas in the Ouachita Mountains, to John R. Hall and Elizabeth (née Hodges) Hall. He attended Malvern School District and played catcher on the baseball team. Following graduation, he attended the University of Arkansas, earning a degree in journalism in 1924. Hall was active on campus, becoming a member of Kappa Sigma fraternity, serving as president of the sophomore class, and editor and business manager of The Arkansas Traveler, the UA student newspaper. He also founded the Arkansas Booster Club.

He married Nancy Pearl Johnson on October 5, 1929. Hall enrolled in the Arkansas Law School, now known as the William H. Bowen School of Law, and began practicing law with E. B. Dillon, representing a major oil company statewide.

== Political career ==
Hall sought to enter politics in 1934 by challenging incumbent Arkansas Secretary of State Ed F. McDonald in the Democratic primary. During the Solid South, the Democratic Party held firm control of virtually every office in The South, including Arkansas. Winning the Democratic primary was considered tantamount to election. McDonald defeated Hall by a 60%-40% margin.
