= Lake Catherine Quarry =

Archaeological site in Arkansas, United States

- U.S. National Register of Historic Places
- Nearest city: Malvern, Arkansas
- Area: 68 acres (28 ha)
- NRHP reference No.: 75000388
- Added to NRHP: September 11, 1975

The Lake Catherine Quarry is a prehistoric stone quarry in Hot Spring County, Arkansas. The site was used as a source of black novaculite, a relatively rare form of chert. Evidence of Native American quarrying activity at the site includes quarry pits, spoil piles, and a scattered talus slope of rejected materials. The site is untainted by historic quarrying, providing a potentially significant window into prehistoric quarrying methods.

The quarry site was listed on the National Register of Historic Places in 1975.

== See also ==
- Hell's Half Acre (Hot Springs, Arkansas): a possible Native American chert quarry in Arkansas
- Jones Mill Site: nearby archaeological site with Native American stone tool construction artifacts
- National Register of Historic Places listings in Hot Spring County, Arkansas
