= Jones Mill Site =

Archaeological site in Arkansas, United States

- Jones Mill Site (3HS28)
- U.S. National Register of Historic Places
- Nearest city: Jones Mill, Arkansas
- Area: 25 acres (10 ha)
- NRHP reference No.: 87001385
- Added to NRHP: September 12, 1988

The Jones Mill Site, designated by the Smithsonian trinomial 3HS28, is a prehistoric archaeological site near Jones Mill in Hot Spring County, Arkansas. It is a deeply stratified site, with evidence of human habitation in at least three different time periods. It is one of the few documented Archaic sites in the region, with evidence of human activity dating to 3000 BCE. It is located near documented prehistoric stone quarry sites, and finds at the site include extensive stone tool construction artifacts.

The site was listed on the National Register of Historic Places in 1988.

== See also ==
- Lake Catherine Quarry: a nearby Native American chert quarry
- National Register of Historic Places listings in Hot Spring County, Arkansas
