= Strauss House =

Historic house in Arkansas, United States

- U.S. National Register of Historic Places
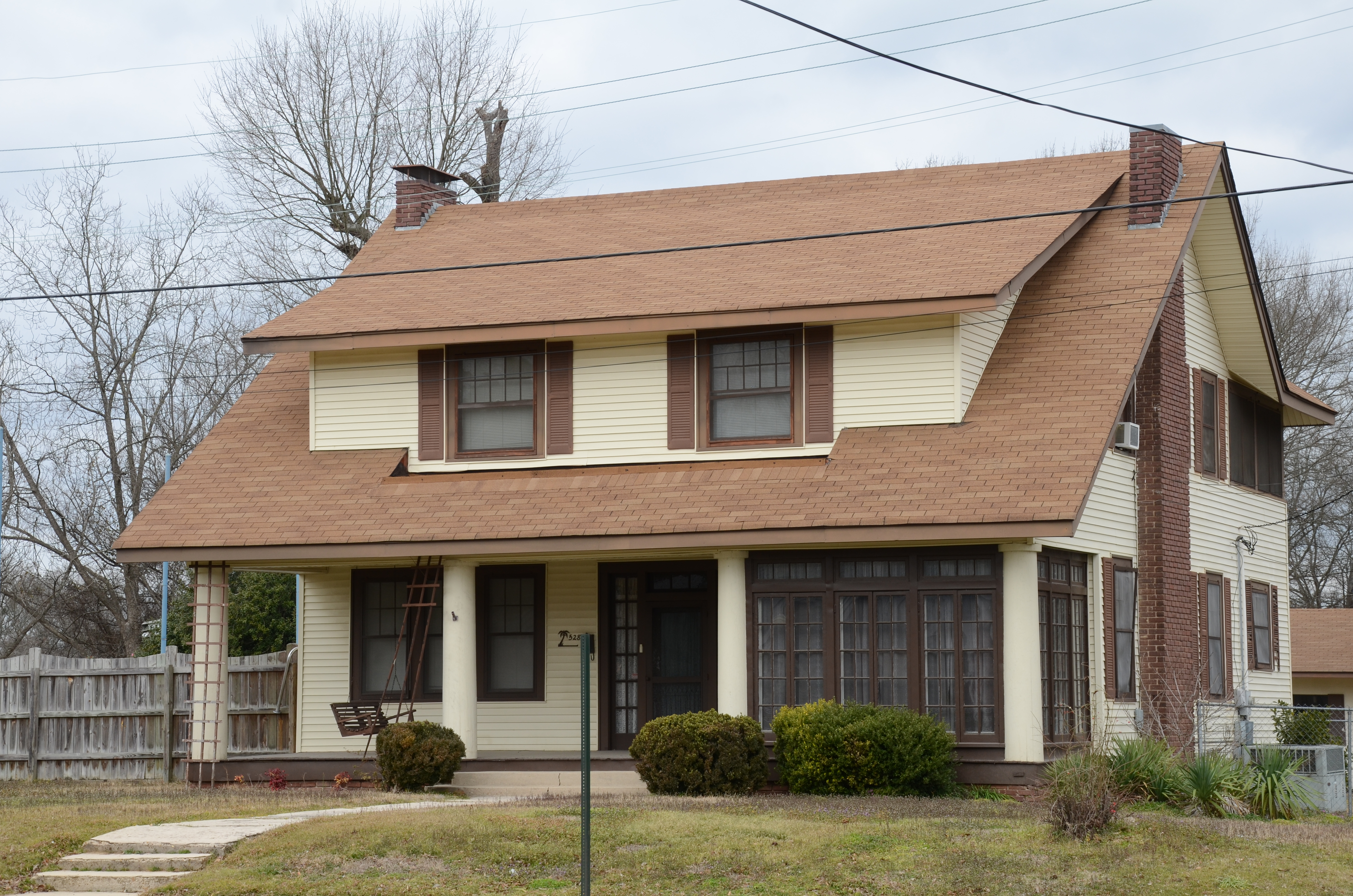

- Location within Arkansas Location within the United States
- Interactive map showing the location of Strauss House
- Location: 528 E. Page St., Malvern, Arkansas
- Coordinates: 34°21′50″N 92°48′26″W
- Area: less than one acre
- Built: 1919
- Architect: Thompson and Harding
- Architectural style: Colonial Revival, Dutch Colonial
- MPS: Thompson, Charles L., Design Collection TR
- NRHP reference No.: 82000830
- Added to NRHP: December 22, 1982

The Strauss House is a historic house at 528 East Page Street in Malvern, Arkansas. It is a 1 1/2-story wood-frame structure, with a side gable roof, clapboard siding, and a brick foundation. Its front facade has a wide shed-roof dormer with extended eaves in the roof, and a recessed porch supported by Tuscan columns. Built in 1919, it was designed by the Arkansas firm of Thompson and Harding, and is a fine local variant of the Dutch Colonial Revival style.

The house was listed on the National Register of Historic Places in 1982.

== See also ==
- National Register of Historic Places listings in Hot Spring County, Arkansas

This house was built for Adalbert Strauss, president of Malvern Lumber Company in Perla, Arkansas.
