= Lawyers' Row Historic District =

Historic district in Arkansas, United States

- U.S. National Register of Historic Places
- U.S. Historic district
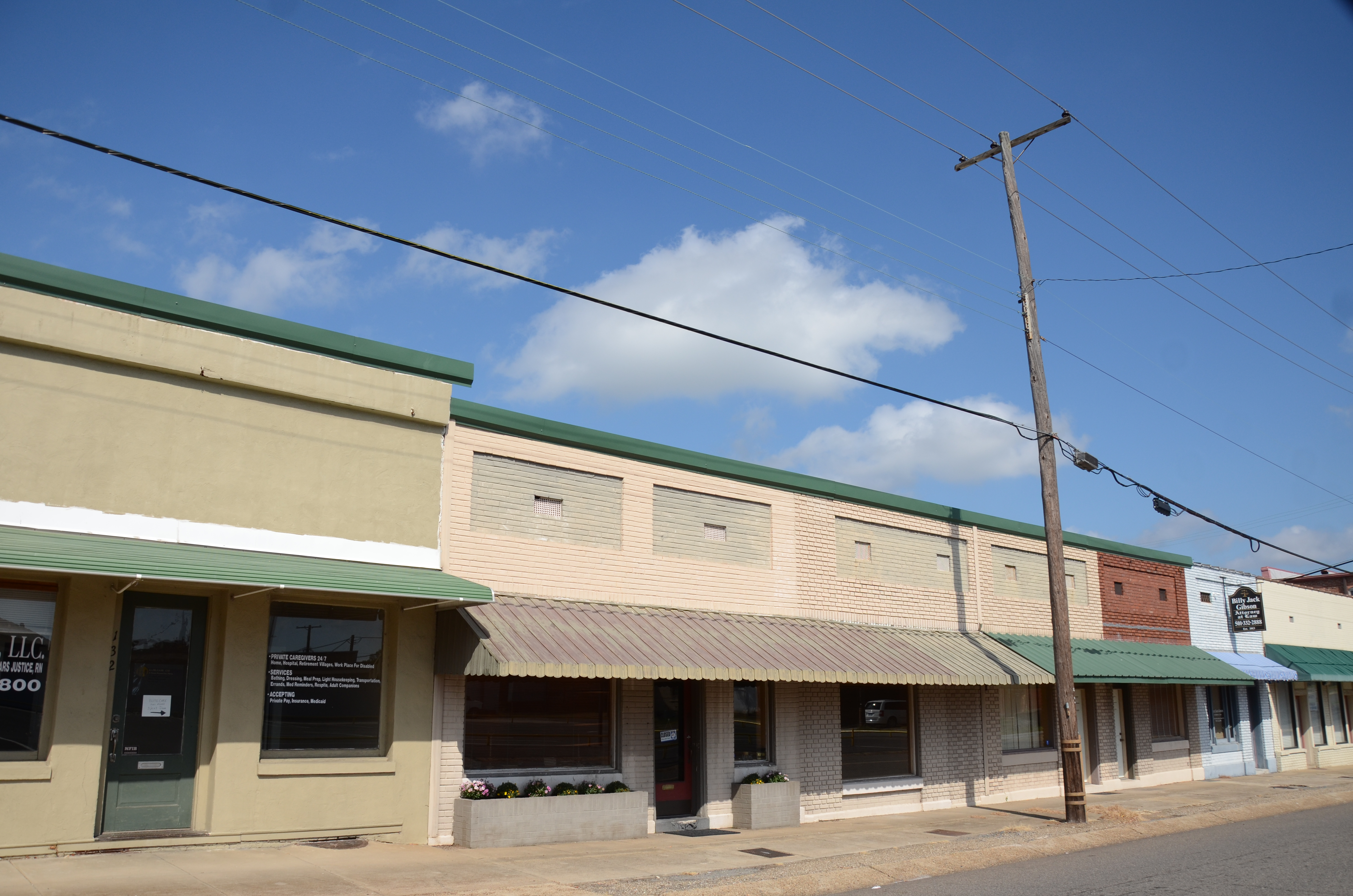

- Location within Arkansas Location within the United States
- Location: 118, 120, 130, 132 W. 2nd St., Malvern, Arkansas
- Coordinates: 34°21′49″N 92°48′53″W
- NRHP reference No.: 15000625
- Added to NRHP: September 28, 2015

The Lawyers' Row Historic District encompasses a group of four commercial office buildings on West 2nd Street in Malvern, Arkansas. The four buildings, joined by party walls, are all single-story masonry structures, built between 1910 and 1920, with awnings across the front, and a raised parapet with decorative panels above the awning. These buildings were all built to house law offices, giving the area its name. Most of the lawyers had moved out by 2000.

The district was listed on the National Register of Historic Places in 2015. At that time, there were still two legal offices in the district's buildings.

== See also ==
- National Register of Historic Places listings in Hot Spring County, Arkansas
