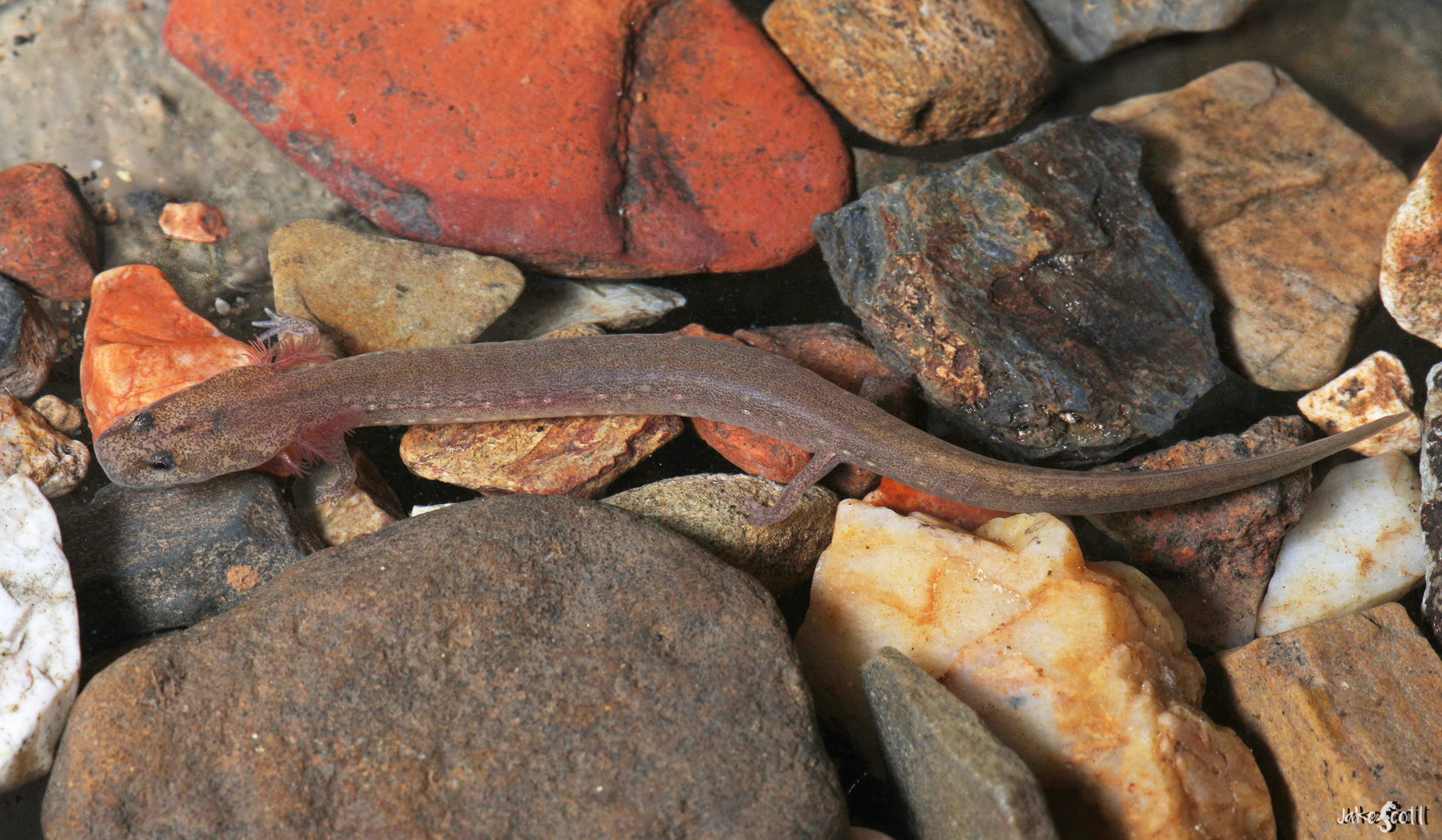

Conservation status
- Vulnerable (IUCN 3.1)

- Critically Imperiled (NatureServe)

Scientific classification
- Kingdom: Animalia
- Phylum: Chordata
- Class: Amphibia
- Order: Urodela
- Family: Plethodontidae
- Genus: Eurycea
- Species: E. subfluvicola

Binomial name
- Eurycea subfluvicola Bonett, 2014

= Eurycea subfluvicola =

Species of amphibian

Eurycea subfluvicola, commonly known as the Ouachita streambed salamander, is a species of salamanders found within the Slunger creek valley in Lake Catherine State Park, Arkansas. The species is paedomorphic. The species' scientific name derives from "sub" (below), "fluvius" (stream), and "colo" (to dwell).
