= Clark House (Malvern, Arkansas) =

Historic house in Arkansas, United States

- U.S. National Register of Historic Places
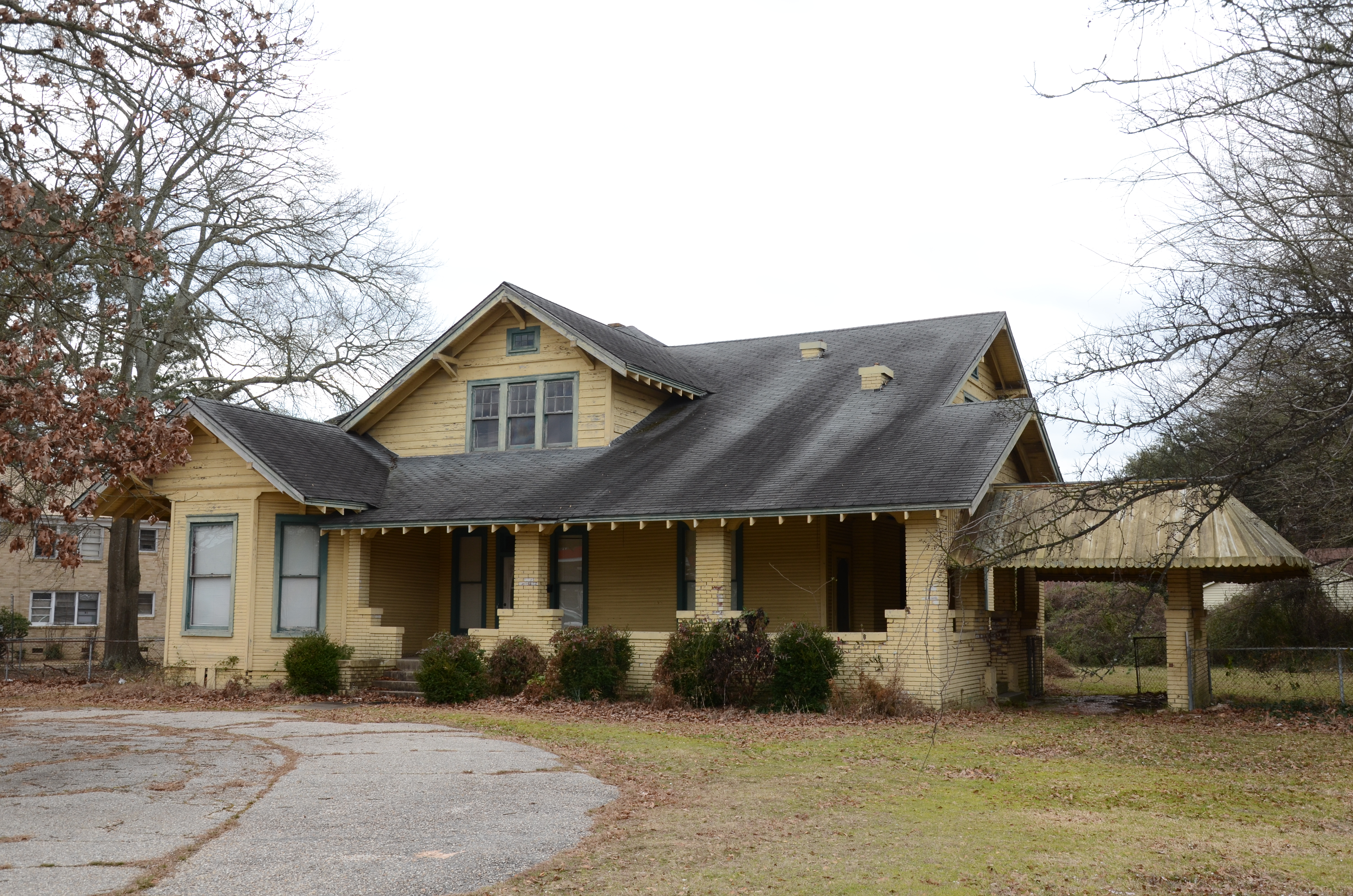

- Location within Arkansas Location within the United States
- Interactive map showing the location of Clark House
- Location: 1324 S. Main St., Malvern, Arkansas
- Coordinates: 34°21′24″N 92°48′30″W
- Area: less than one acre
- Built: 1916
- Architect: Charles L. Thompson
- Architectural style: Bungalow/Craftsman
- MPS: Thompson, Charles L., Design Collection TR
- NRHP reference No.: 82000828
- Added to NRHP: December 22, 1982

The Clark House is a historic house at 1324 South Main Street in Malvern, Arkansas. It is a 1 1/2-story wood-frame structure, roughly rectangular in plan, with a side-gable roof, projecting front-facing cross-gable sections on the left side, and a hip-roofed porch extending to the right. The roof extends over a recessed porch, with exposed rafter ends and brick pier supports. It was built in 1916 in Bungalow/Craftsman style to a design by architect Charles L. Thompson.

The house was listed on the National Register of Historic Places in 1982.

== See also ==
- National Register of Historic Places listings in Hot Spring County, Arkansas
