= Malvern Rosenwald School =

- U.S. National Register of Historic Places
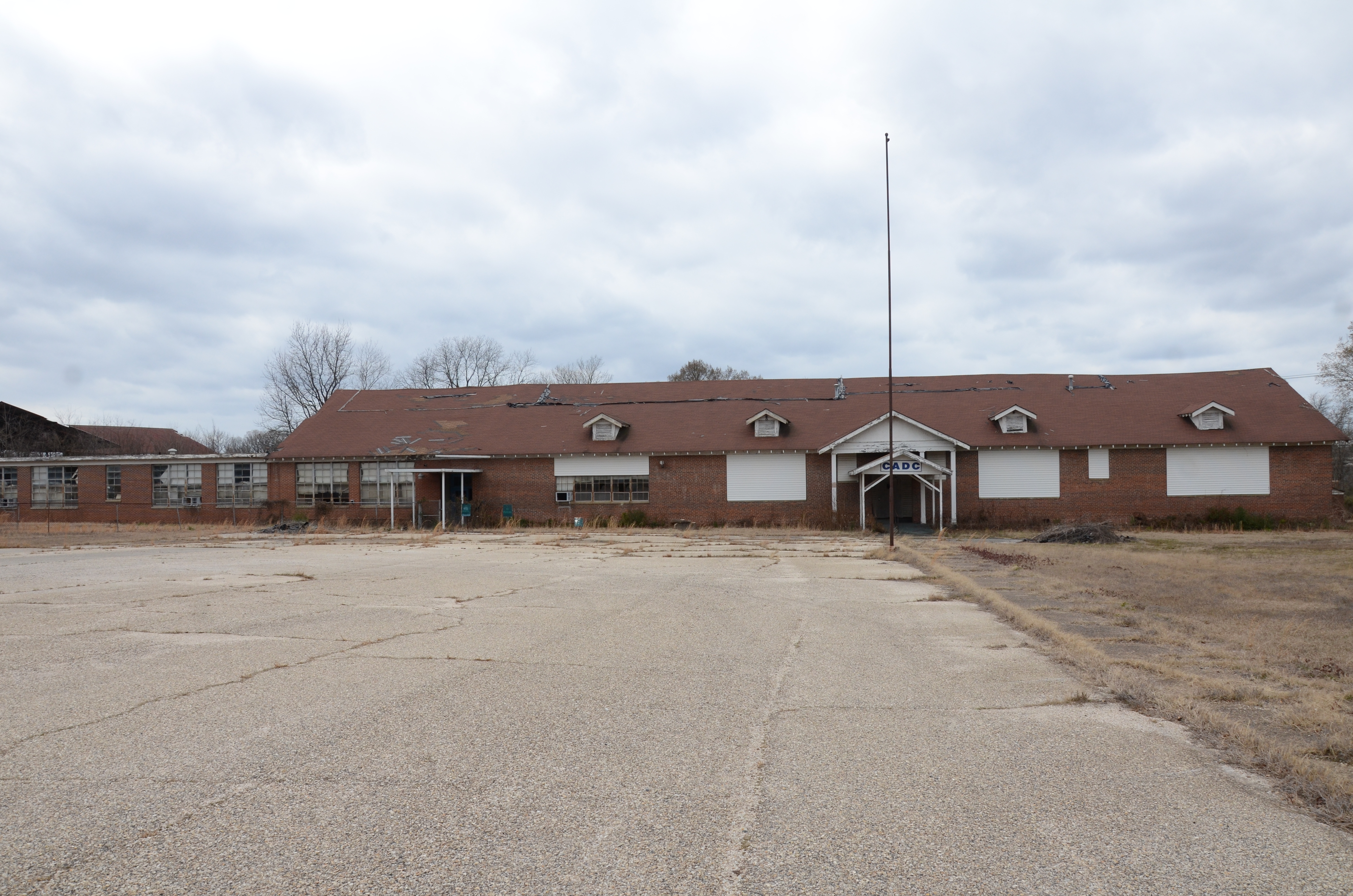

- Location within Arkansas Location within the United States
- Location: 836 Acme St., Malvern, Arkansas
- Coordinates: 34°21′45″N 92°49′18″W
- Area: less than one acre
- Built: 1929
- Architectural style: Bungalow/craftsman, Modern Movement
- NRHP reference No.: 05001075
- Added to NRHP: September 28, 2005

The Malvern Rosenwald School is a historic school building at 836 Acme Street (between it and Burks Street) in Malvern, Arkansas. It is a T-shaped single-story brick building, with a gable roof over its original main section. A gable-roofed entry is centered on the eastern facade. Additions extend the original block to the left of the entrance, the last one with a flat roof. The school was built in 1929 with funding assistance from the Rosenwald Fund, but did not follow a standard Rosenwald plan. It first served African-American students in grades 1–9, but was gradually expanded to include high school students. The high school students were reassigned to a new school in 1952, after which it became the Tuggle Elementary School. Both schools were closed around the time that Malvern's schools were integrated, in 1970.

The building was listed on the National Register of Historic Places in 2005.

== See also ==
- National Register of Historic Places listings in Hot Spring County, Arkansas
