= Devil's Half Acre =

Devil's Half Acre, Devil's Half-Acre or Devil's half acre may refer to:

== Places ==
- The Devil's Half-Acre, Pennsylvania, a parcel of land and popular tourist location in Buck's County
- "Devil's half acre", an area of slave trading and slave jails in the 1800s, including Lumpkin's Jail, Richmond, Virginia
- A meadow along the Barlow Road on the Oregon Trail near Mount Hood in Oregon

== See also ==
- Devil's Acre, a notorious slum near Westminster Abbey in Victorian London, England
- Hell's Half Acre (disambiguation)
