= Little Switzerland (Shorewood Hills, Arkansas) =

- U.S. National Register of Historic Places
- Nearest city: Shorewood Hills, Arkansas
- Area: 0.4 acres (0.16 ha)
- Built: 1939
- Artist: Dionicio Rodriguez
- MPS: Arkansas Sculptures of Dionicio Rodriguez TR
- NRHP reference No.: 86003584
- Added to NRHP: December 4, 1986

Little Switzerland is a historic property in Garland County, Arkansas. Located near the Couchwood estate of Harvey C. Couch in the Shorewood Hills area, the property was intended by Couch to be a place where he could go fishing with friends, but its development remained unfinished at his death. The property is notable for several pieces of artwork installed by the Mexican artist Dionicio Rodriguez. Rodriguez, known for his naturalistic-appearing artwork, installed a water wheel on a small lake, and a "wooden" bench. The major work he designed for the property was a barbecue that resembled a tree, with a 37-foot (11 m) base, and its smokestack concealed in the trunk. It was one of Rodriguez' largest works.

The property was listed on the National Register of Historic Places in 1986.

== See also ==
- National Register of Historic Places listings in Garland County, Arkansas
