= Lake Catherine State Park =

Park in Arkansas, United States

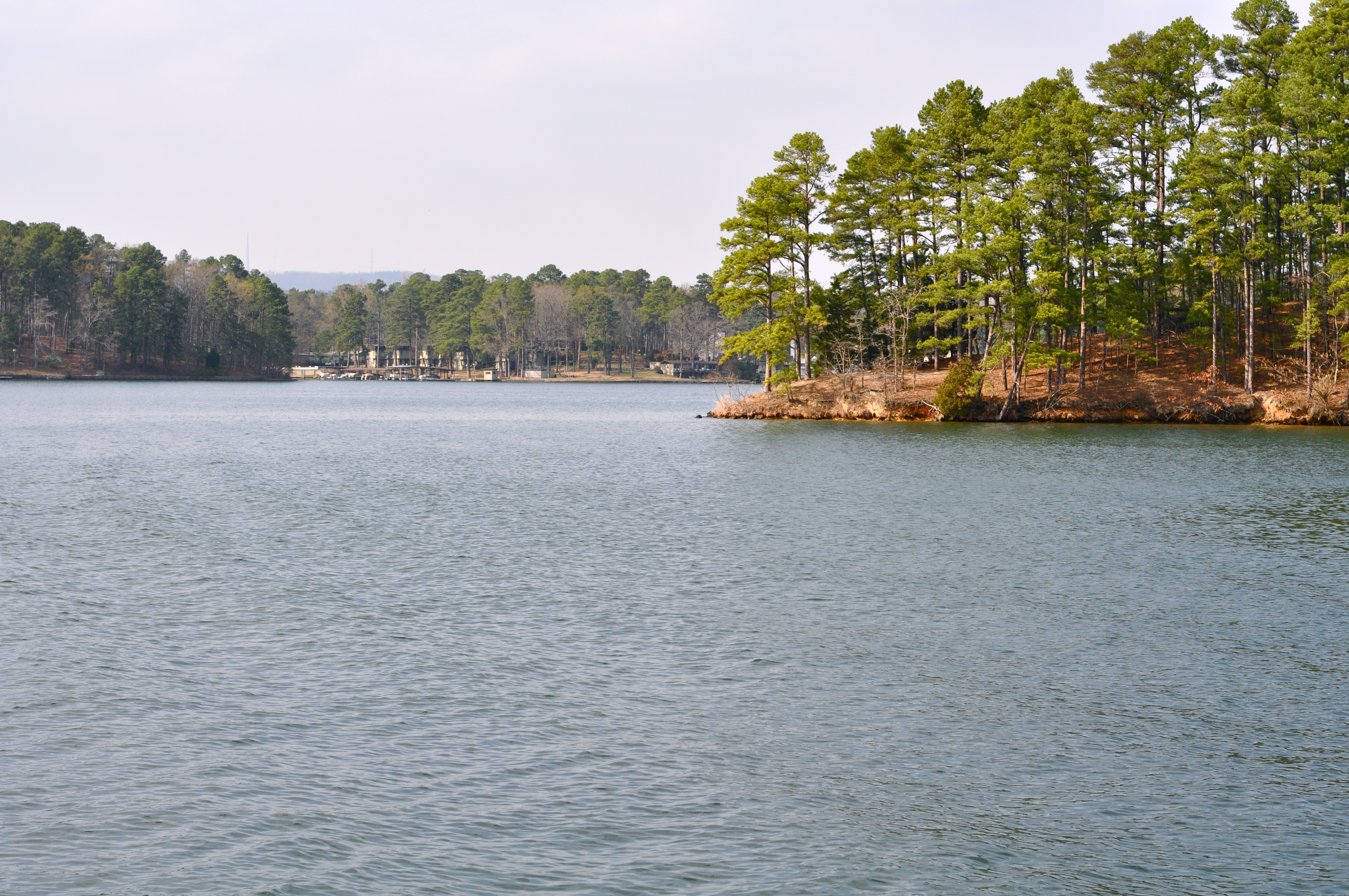

- Location within Arkansas Location within the United States
- Interactive map of Lake Catherine State Park
- Location: Hot Spring County, Arkansas, United States
- Coordinates: 34°26′17″N 92°55′05″W
- Area: 2,180 acres (880 ha)
- Elevation: 551 feet (168 m)
- Established: 1935
- Administrator: Arkansas Department of Parks, Heritage and Tourism
- Website: Official website
- Arkansas State Parks

Lake Catherine State Park is a 2,180-acre (880 ha) public recreation area located on the south shore of Lake Catherine, eight miles (13 km) southeast of Hot Springs, Arkansas. The park was built in the 1930s by the Civilian Conservation Corps. Three stone-and-wood cabins, a former concessions building, and a bridge constructed in the Corps' rustic architecture style are listed on the National Register of Historic Places.

== Activities and amenities ==
Park amenities include a visitors center, cabins and campsites, marina with boat rentals, horseback riding stable, picnicking and swimming areas, and ten miles of hiking trails.

== CCC Cabins ==
- Cabin No. 1
- U.S. National Register of Historic Places
- Location: Cabin area access rd., Lake Catherine State Park, Shorewood Hills, Arkansas
- Coordinates: 34°26′15″N 92°54′46″W
- Area: less than one acre
- Built: 1941
- Built by: Civilian Conservation Corps
- Architectural style: Rustic Resort
- MPS: Facilities Constructed by the CCC in Arkansas MPS
- NRHP reference No.: 95000455
- Added to NRHP: April 20, 1995

The Lake Catherine State Park CCC Cabins are a collection of four rustic cabins constructed by crews of the Civilian Conservation Corps in what is now Lake Catherine State Park in Hot Spring County, Arkansas. Three of the four cabins were built for use as tourist accommodations and continue to serve in that role, while the fourth, probably built to house administrative functions, is now used in the state park as a "nature cabin", with exhibits on the history and natural environment of the park. Three of the cabins were separately listed on the National Register of Historic Places in 1992; the fourth was listed in 1995.

=== Cabin #1 ===
Cabin #1 was the first of the tourist cabins to be built by the CCC, and it has a unique floor plan not found in the other cabins. It is a single-story frame structure, with rough weatherboard exterior and an original stone and concrete foundation. A screened porch extends across the cabin's southern facade, looking out over the lake, and a dressed stone chimney rises on the east side. The interior includes a living room, kitchen, hall, bedroom, and bath.

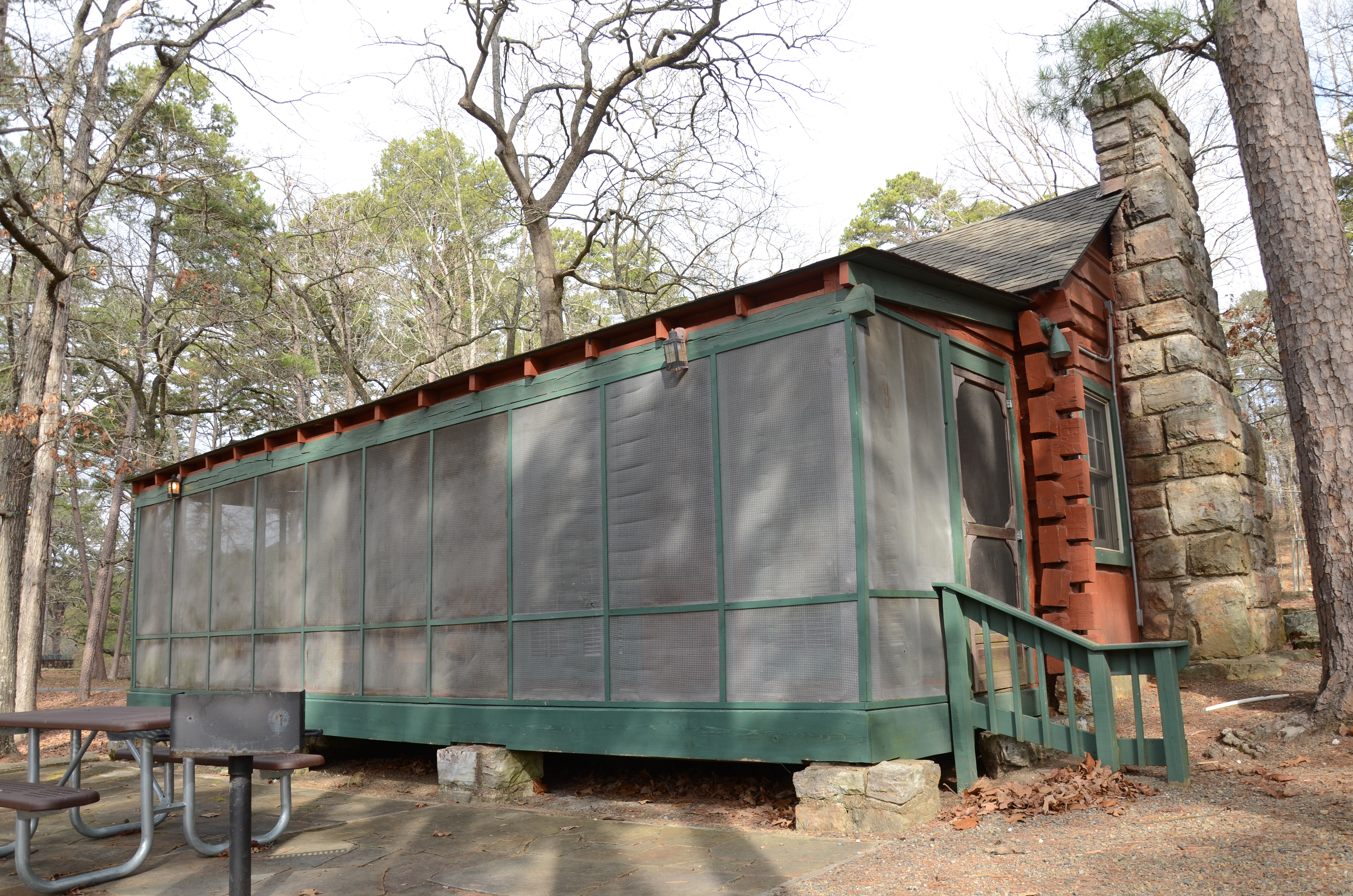
Lake Catherine State Park-Cabin No. 1

=== Cabins #2 and #3 ===
Cabins #2 and #3 are both single-story frame structure, with rough weatherboard exterior and a stone chimney. They were built about 1935.

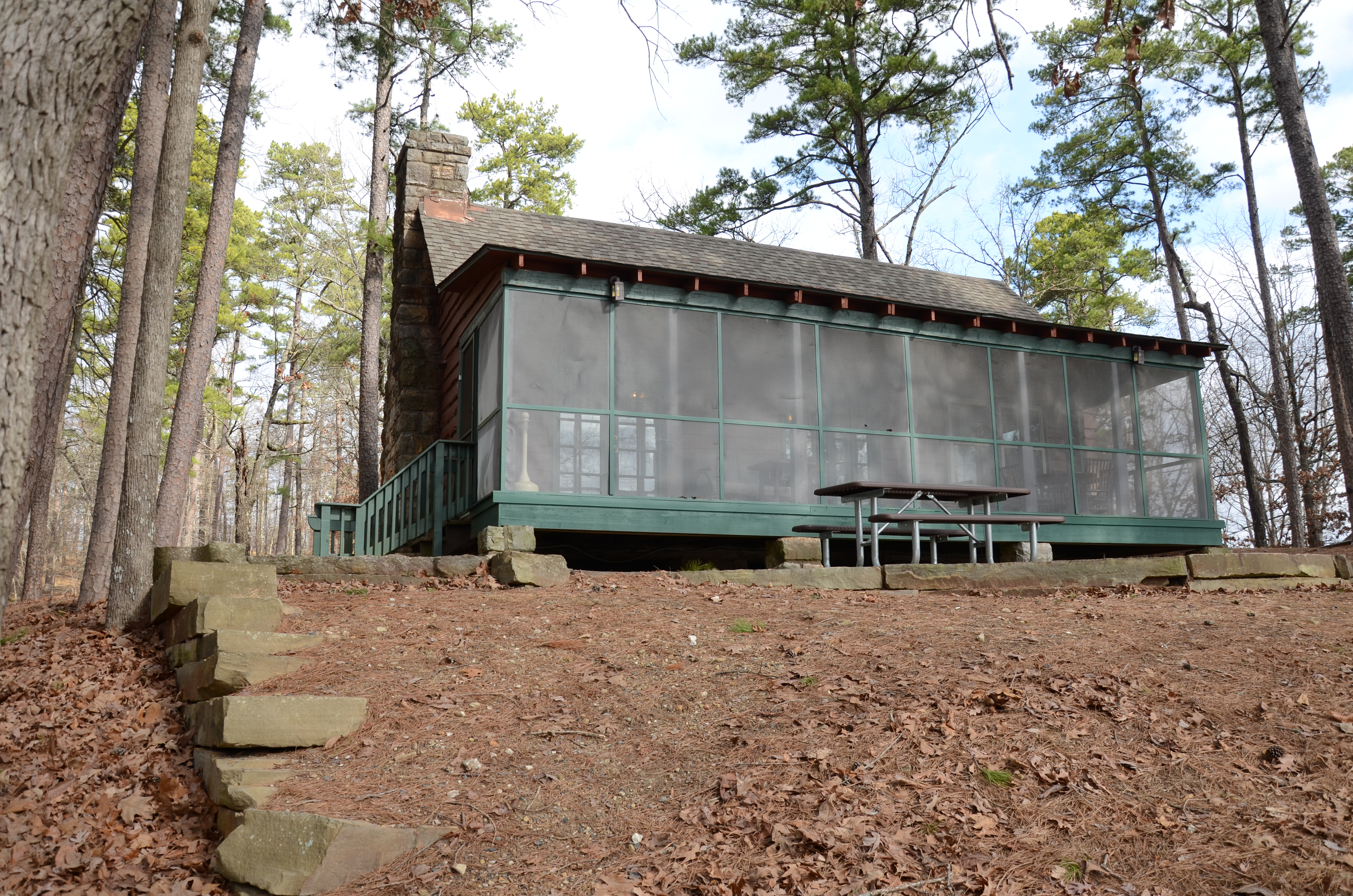
Lake Catherine State Park-Cabin No. 2

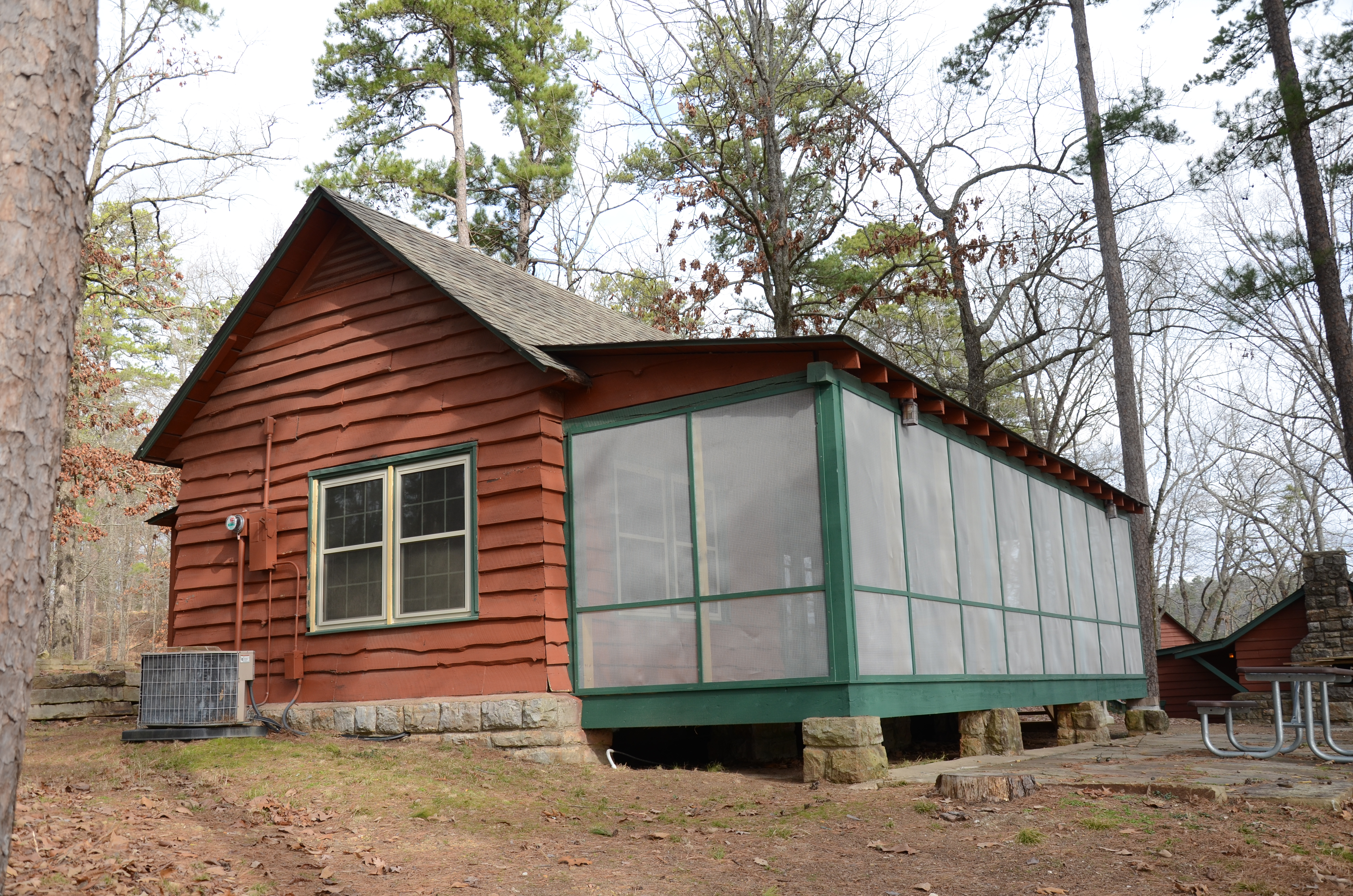
Lake Catherine State Park-Cabin No. 3

=== Nature Cabin ===
The Nature Cabin was built about 1935, and is also a single-story Rustic structure. Its original purpose is not known, but it probably housed administrative functions. It is now used to house exhibits on the park's cultural history and environment.

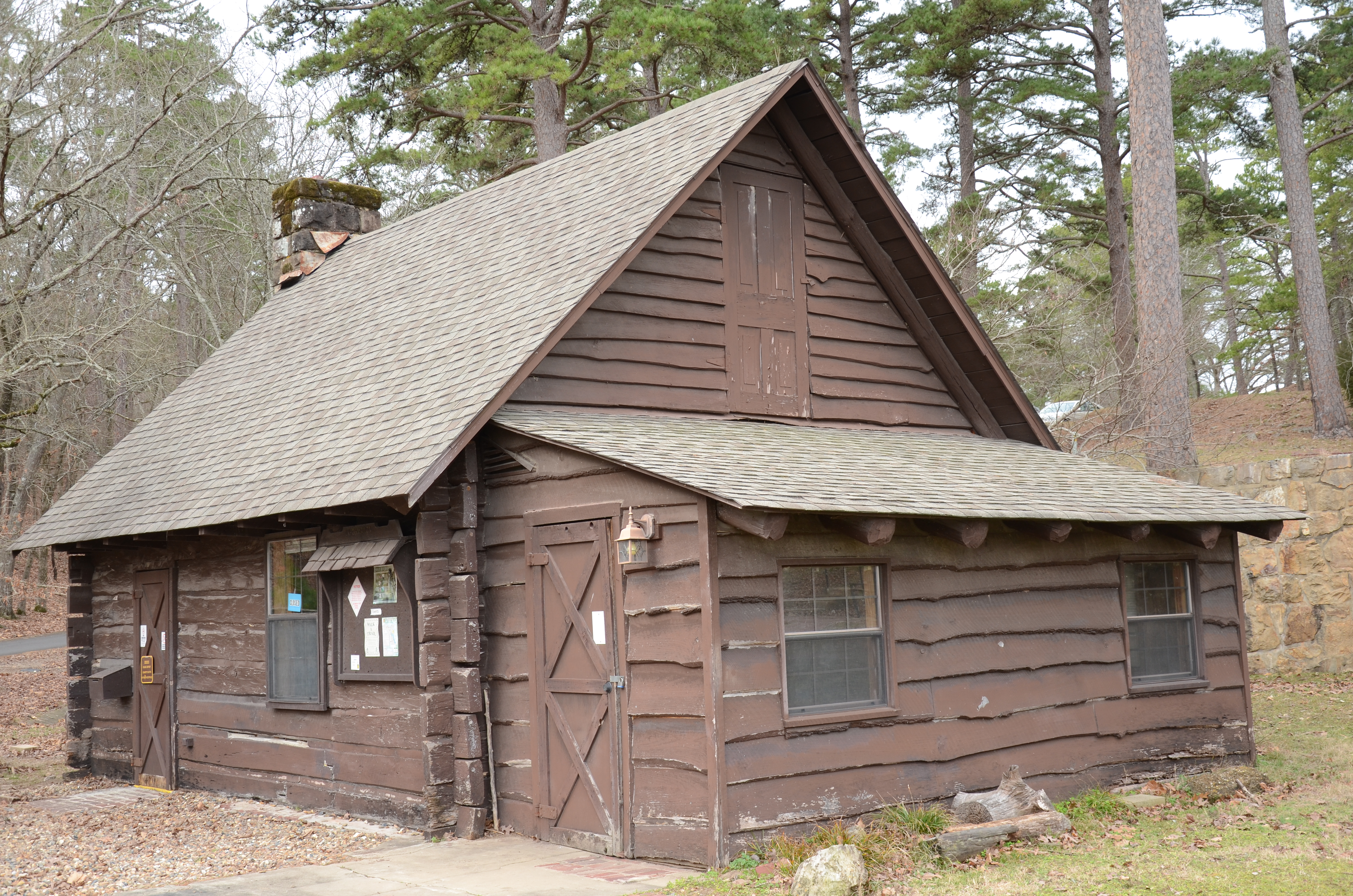
Lake Catherine State Park-Nature Cabin

== See also ==
- Ouachita streambed salamander
- Lake Catherine State Park-Bridge No. 2
- National Register of Historic Places listings in Hot Spring County, Arkansas
