= Rockport Cemetery =

Historic cemetery in Arkansas, United States

- U.S. National Register of Historic Places
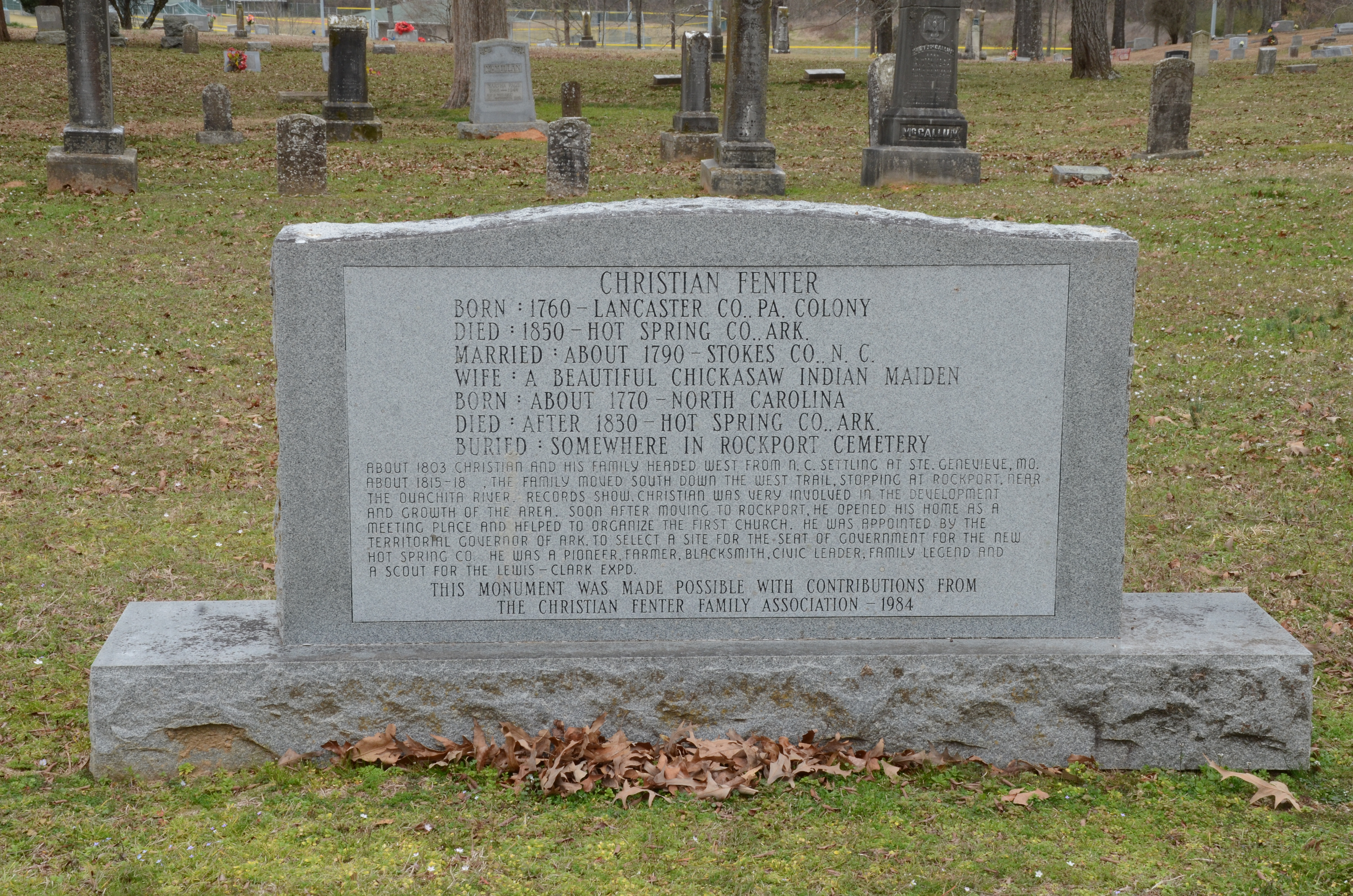

- Location within Arkansas Location within the United States
- Location: Business US 270, Rockport, Arkansas
- Coordinates: 34°22′48″N 92°49′57″W
- Area: 2.5 acres (1.0 ha)
- Built: 1851
- NRHP reference No.: 01001527
- Added to NRHP: January 28, 2002

The Rockport Cemetery is a historic cemetery located off Business United States Route 270 in Rockport, Arkansas. Just under 10 acres (4.0 ha) in size, it is the community's oldest and largest cemetery, with known burials dating back to 1851. It is the best-preserved element of the community's early settlement period and was laid out in the then-fashionable rural cemetery style. A 2.5-acre (1.0 ha) portion of the cemetery, including its two oldest sections, was listed on the National Register of Historic Places in 2002.

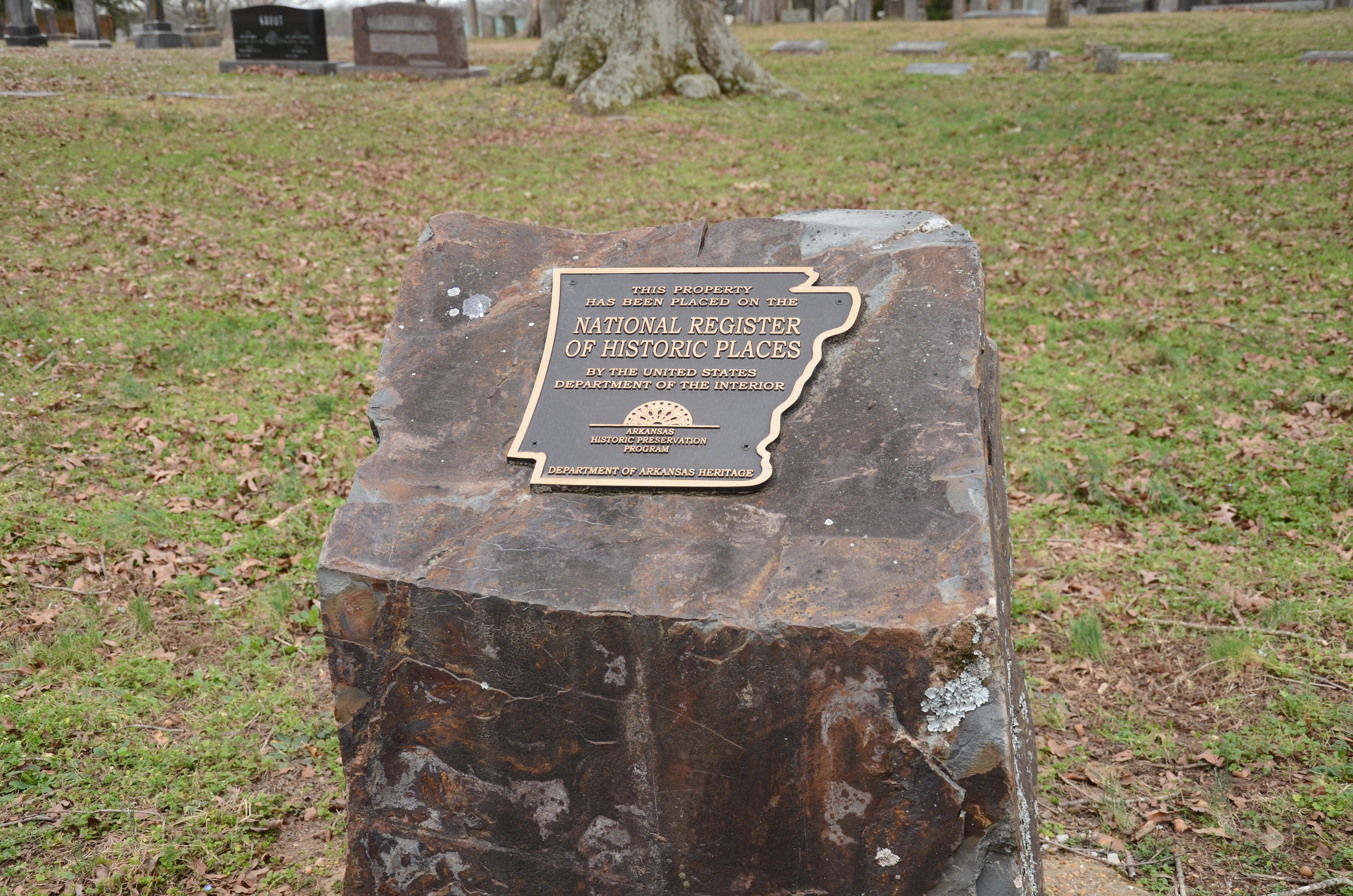
National Register sign 2016

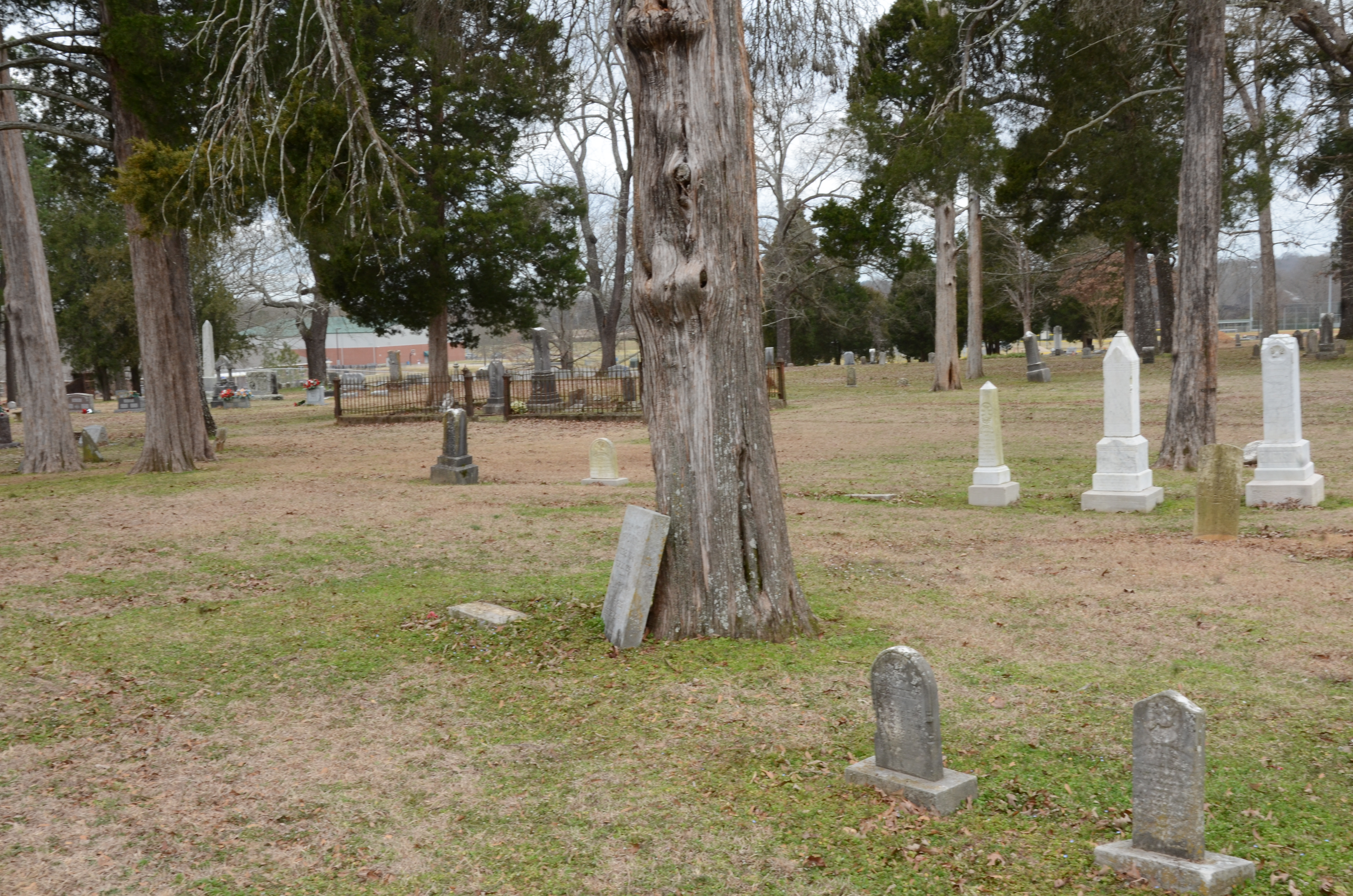
Rockport Cemetery 2016

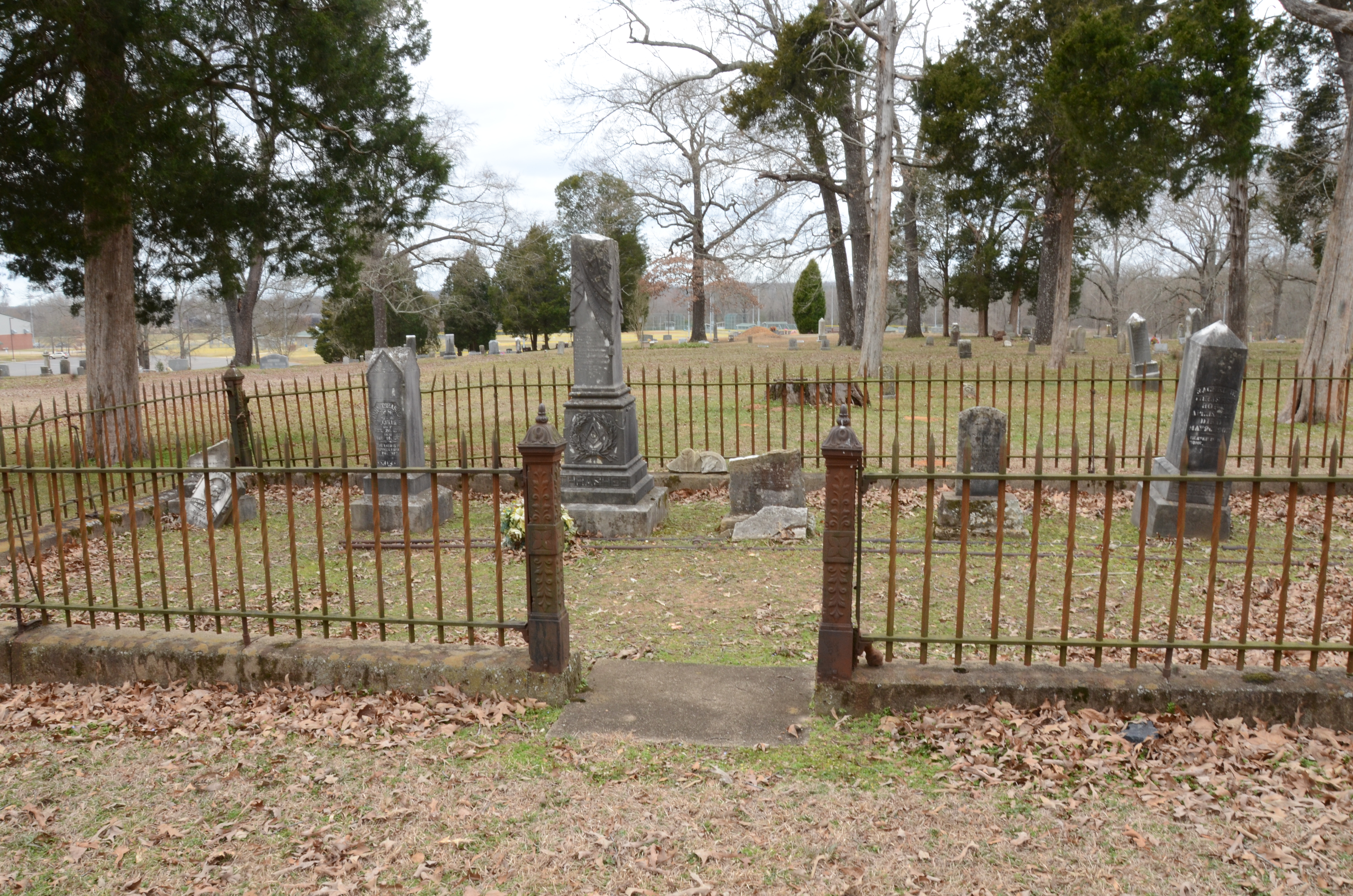
Rockport Cemetery 2016

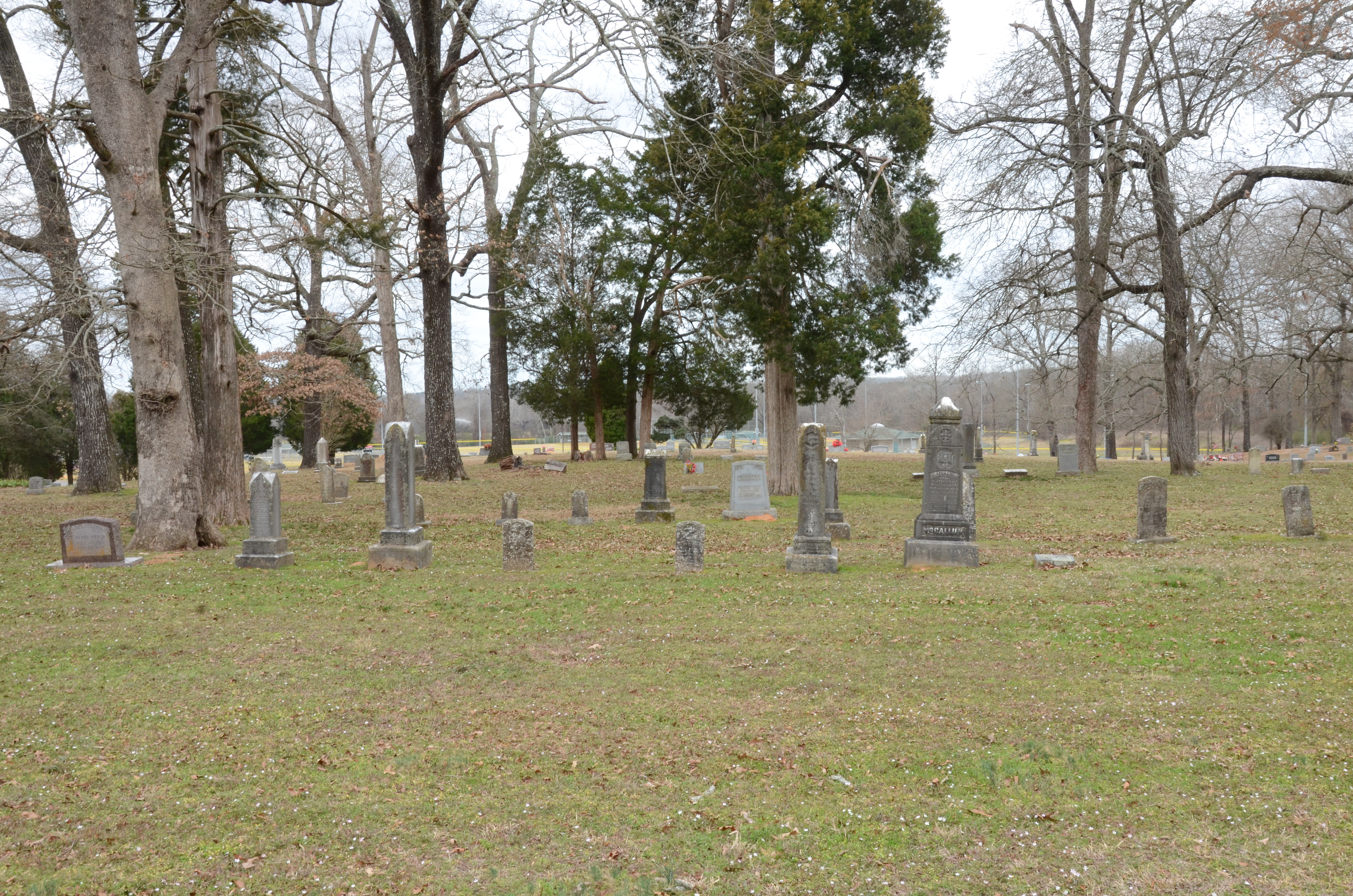
Rockport Cemetery 2016

== See also ==
- National Register of Historic Places listings in Hot Spring County, Arkansas
