= Pine Bluff Street Historic District =

Historic district in Arkansas, United States

- U.S. National Register of Historic Places
- U.S. Historic district
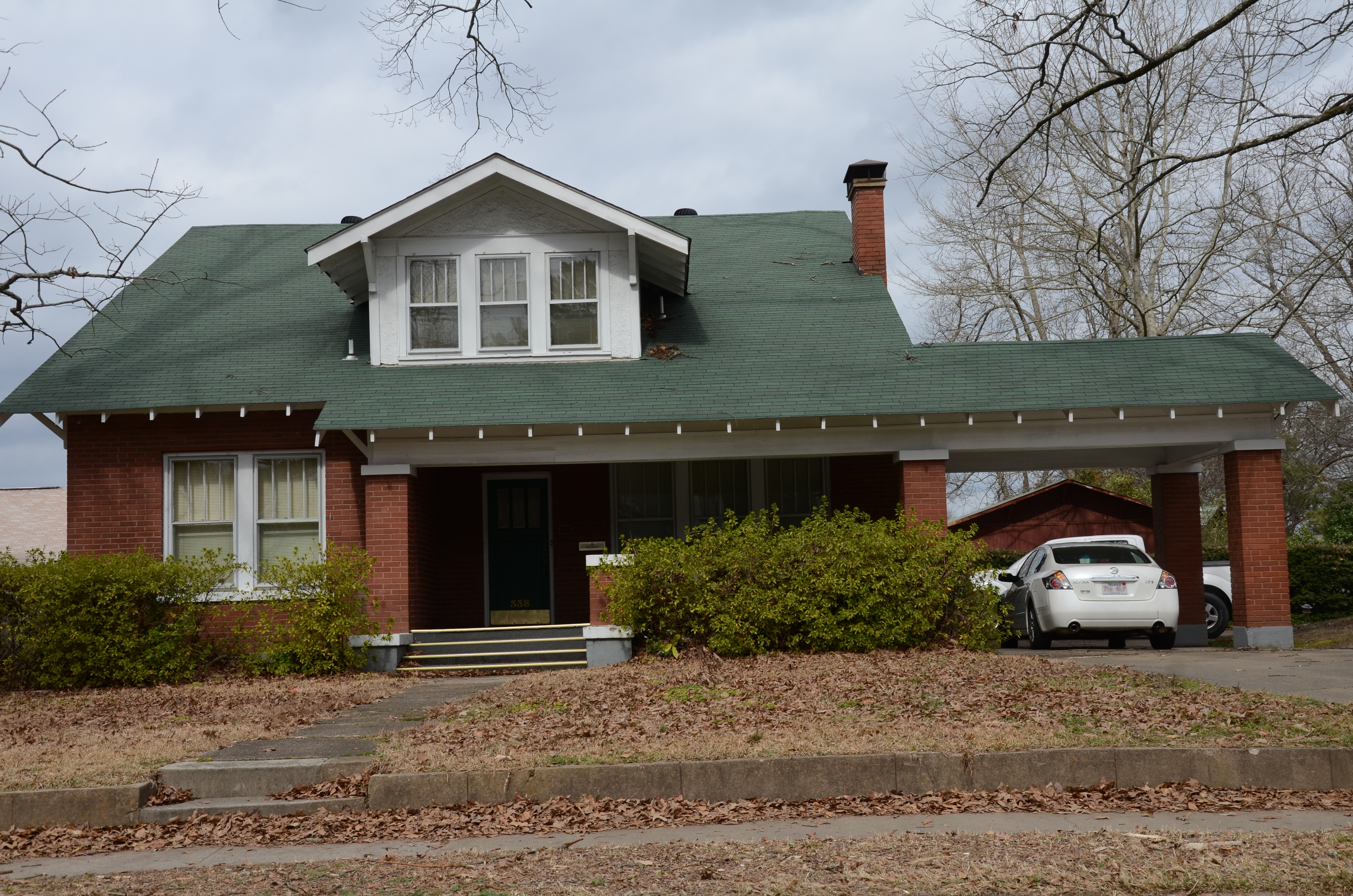

- Location within Arkansas Location within the United States
- Location: Pine Bluff St., roughly from Bois D'Arc to McNeal St., Malvern, Arkansas
- Coordinates: 34.36173°N 92.80565°W
- Area: 10 acres (4.0 ha)
- Architect: Ye Planry Architects
- Architectural style: Bungalow/American Craftsman, Colonial Revival, et al.
- NRHP reference No.: 99000154
- Added to NRHP: February 16, 1999

The Pine Bluff Street Historic District encompasses a well-preserved residential area of Malvern, Arkansas, that was developed between about 1890 and 1940. It extends along Pine Bluff Street, just east of the city center, between Gloster Court and McNeal Street. Most of the houses in this area are American Craftsman style bungalows, although the district is also home to one of Arkansas' finest Second Empire houses, the Bratt-Lea House at 225 Pine Bluff Street. The district was listed on the National Register of Historic Places in 1999, and includes two previously listed properties: the Gatewood House, and the Alderson-Coston House.

Houses in historic district

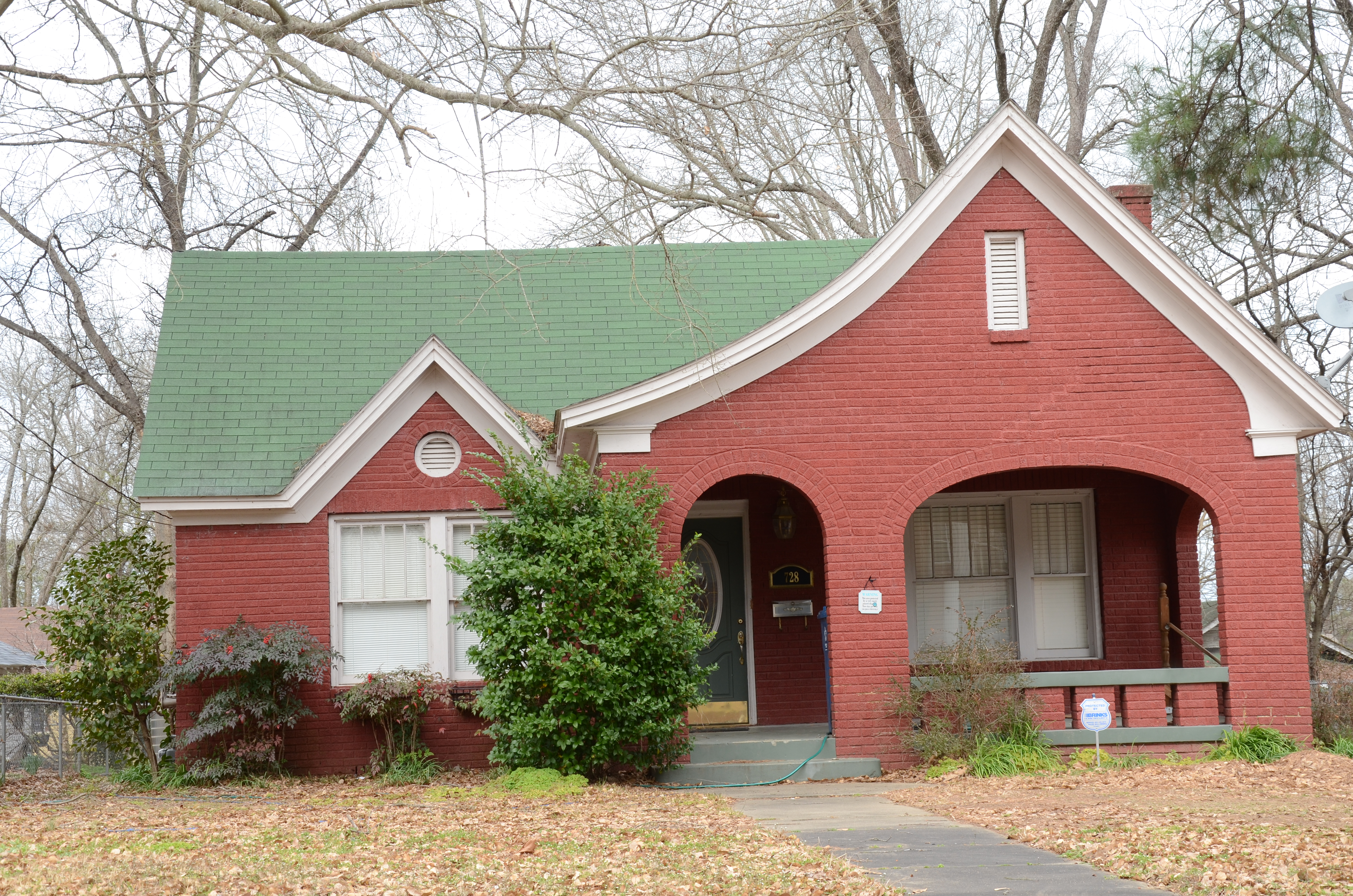

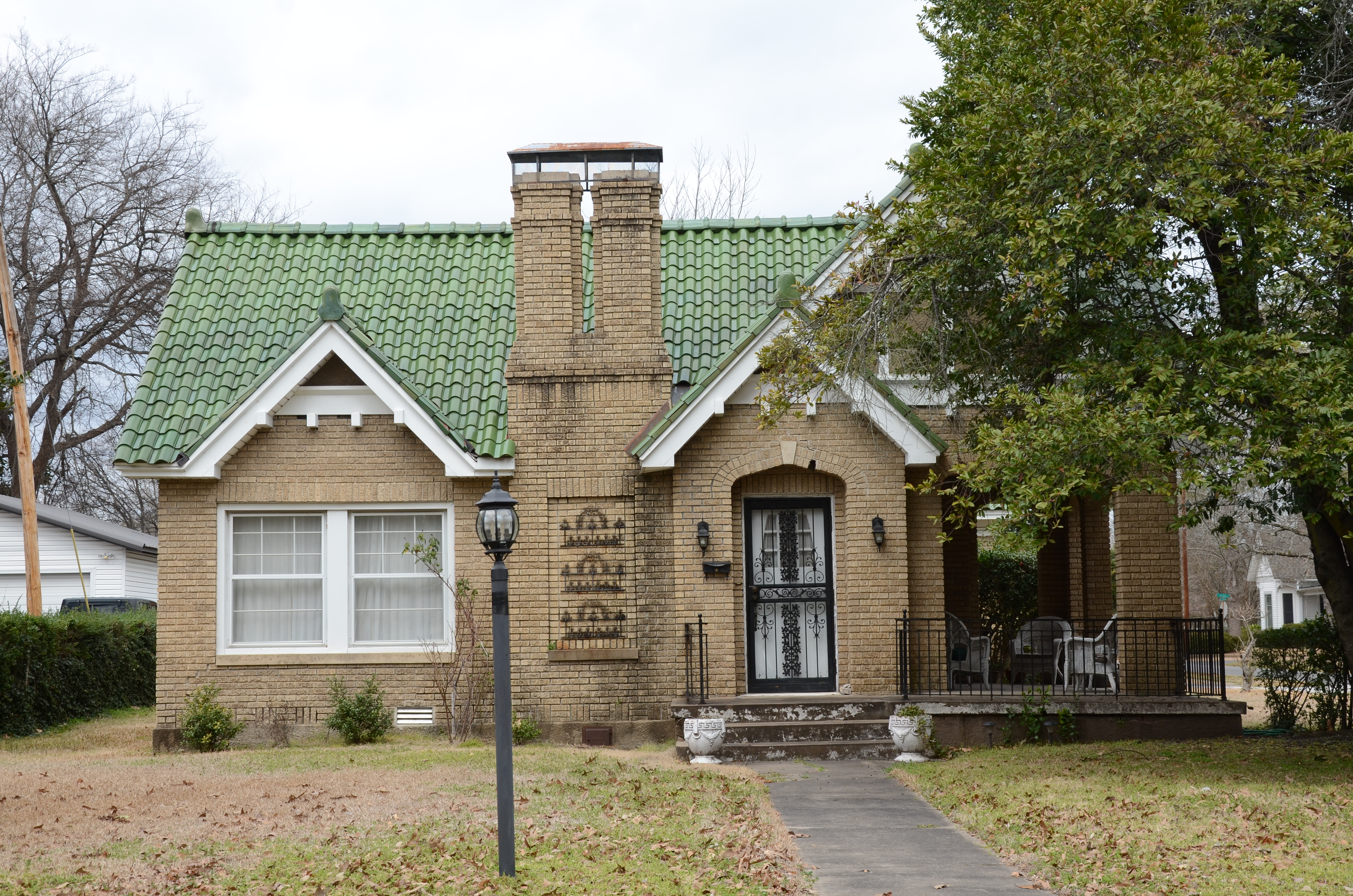

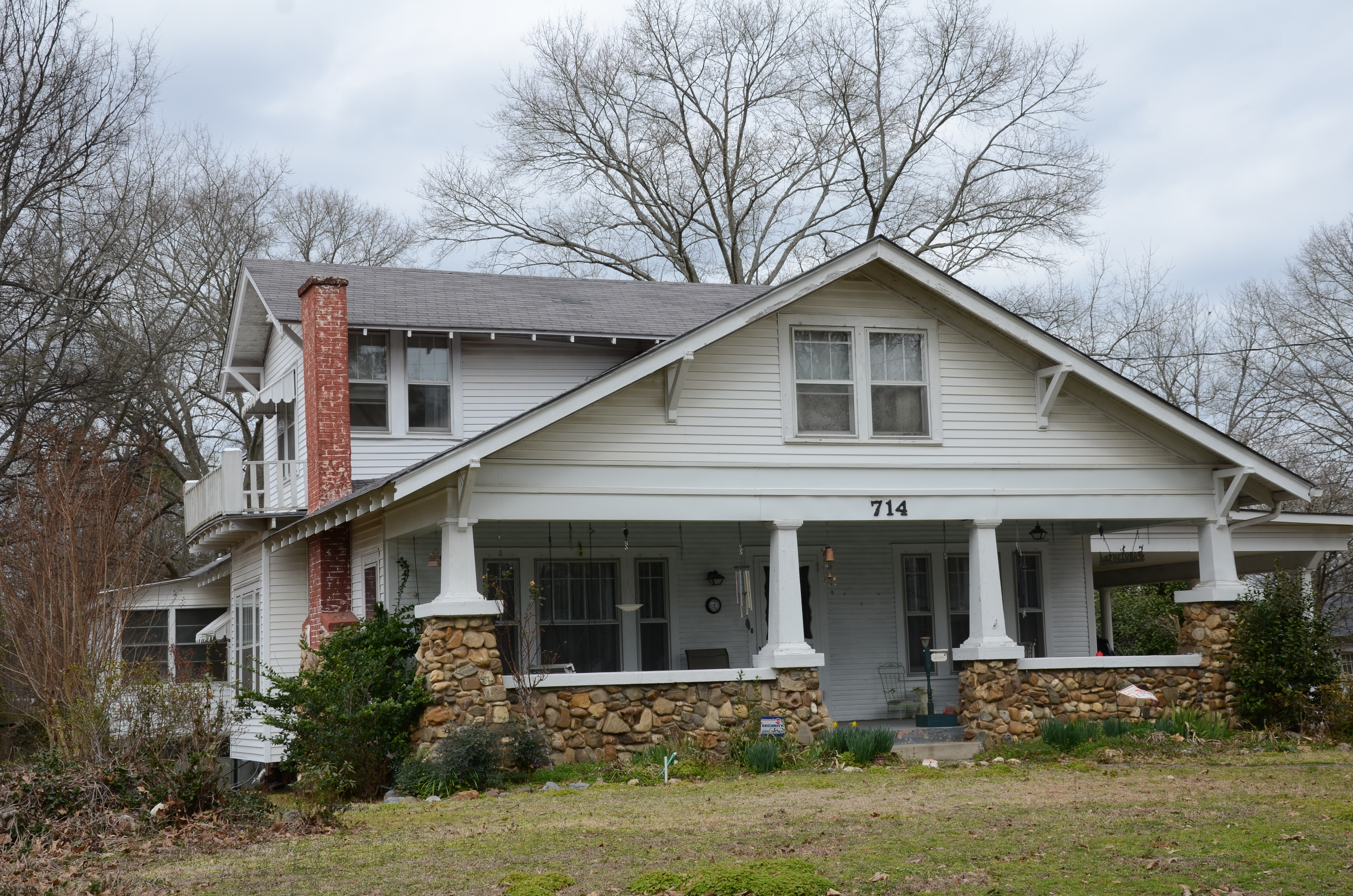

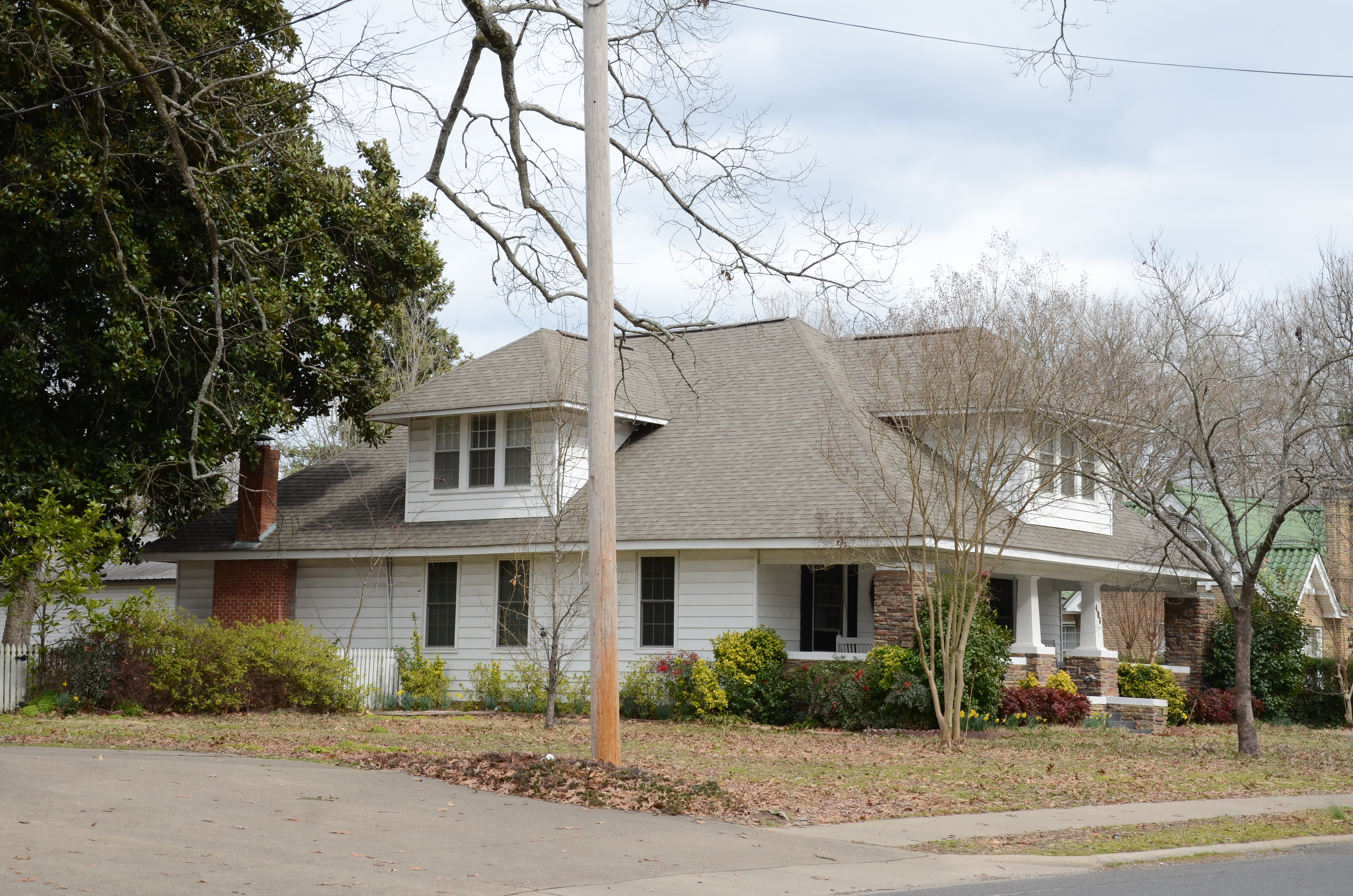

== See also ==
- National Register of Historic Places listings in Hot Spring County, Arkansas
