= Gatewood House (Malvern, Arkansas) =

Historic house in Arkansas, United States

- U.S. National Register of Historic Places
- U.S. Historic district – Contributing property
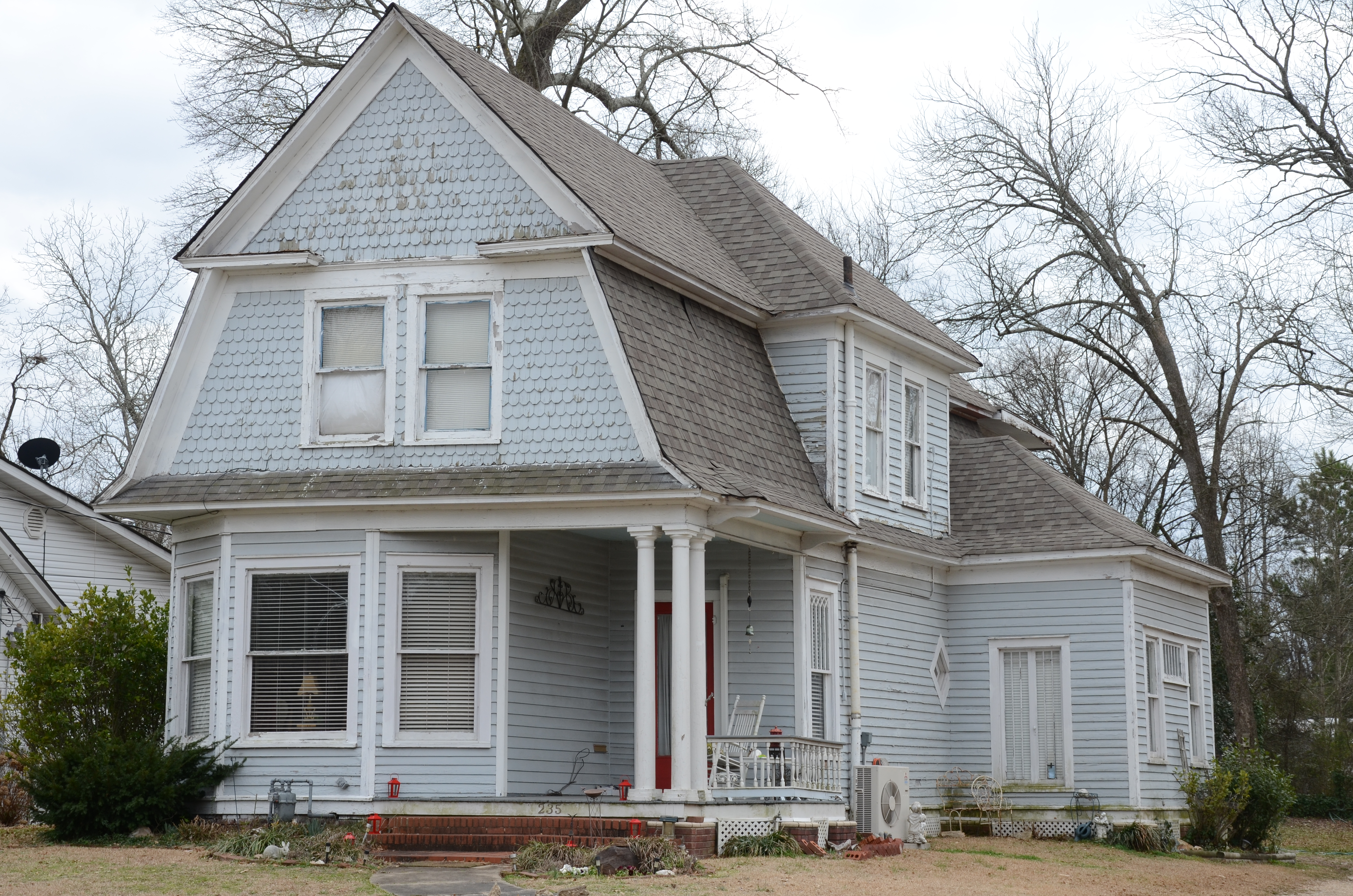

- Location within Arkansas Location within the United States
- Location: 235 Pine Bluff St., Malvern, Arkansas
- Coordinates: 34°21′41″N 92°48′30″W
- Area: less than one acre
- Built: 1905
- Built by: W.T. Cooper
- Architectural style: Shingle Style
- Part of: Pine Bluff Street Historic District (ID99000154)
- NRHP reference No.: 92000928

Significant dates
- Added to NRHP: July 24, 1992
- Designated CP: February 16, 1999

The Gatewood House is a historic house at 235 Pine Bluff Street in Malvern, Arkansas. It is a two-story wood-frame structure, roughly rectangular in plan, with a gambrel roof and weatherboard exterior. The gambrel roof is unusual in that the upper level slightly overhangs the steeper lower parts. The front-facing gable rests above a polygonal bay window on the left and a recessed porch on the right, which is supported by clustered Tuscan columns. Built in 1905, the building represents a well-executed example of a vernacular interpretation of the Shingle style of architecture.

The house was listed on the National Register of Historic Places in 1992.

== See also ==
- National Register of Historic Places listings in Hot Spring County, Arkansas
