= Alderson-Coston House =

Historic house in Arkansas, United States

- U.S. National Register of Historic Places
- U.S. Historic district – Contributing property
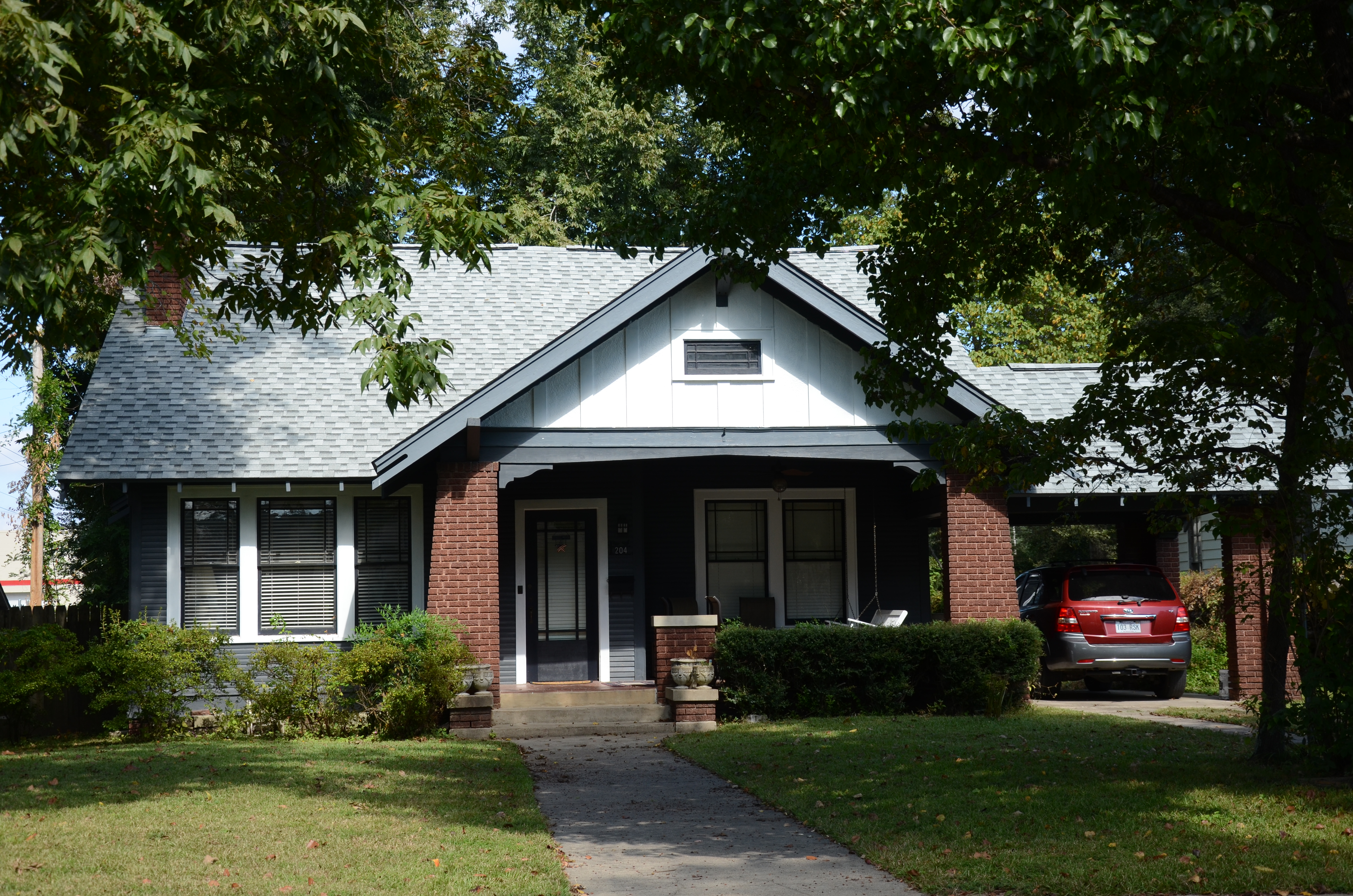

- Location within Arkansas Location within the United States
- Location: 204 Pine Bluff Street, Malvern, Arkansas
- Coordinates: 34°21′43″N 92°48′33″W
- Area: less than one acre
- Built: 1923
- Architectural style: Bungalow/Craftsman
- Part of: Pine Bluff Street Historic District (ID99000154)
- NRHP reference No.: 95000657

Significant dates
- Added to NRHP: May 26, 1995
- Designated CP: February 16, 1999

The Alderson-Coston House is a historic house located at 204 Pine Bluff Street in Malvern, Arkansas.

== Description and history ==
It is a 1 1/2-story wood-framed structure, rectangular in plan with a cross-gable roof, a projecting porch to the south, a porte-cochere to the east, and a two-story ell to the rear. The exterior is finished in wood veneer siding, and has Craftsman styling, with deep eaves showing rafter ends, and brick piers supporting the porch and porte-cochere. The house was built in 1923, and is a relatively unaltered example of American Craftsman architecture.

The house was listed on the National Register of Historic Places on May 26, 1995.

== See also ==
- National Register of Historic Places listings in Hot Spring County, Arkansas
