= Saginaw, Arkansas =

- Unincorporated community
- Location within Arkansas Location within the United States
- Coordinates: 34°18′01″N 92°56′11″W
- Country: United States
- State: Arkansas
- County: Hot Spring
- Elevation: 322 ft (98 m)
- Time zone: UTC-6 (Central (CST))
  - Summer (DST): UTC-5 (CDT)
- Area code: 501

Saginaw is an unincorporated community in Hot Spring County, Arkansas, United States.

The community is located on the Old Military Road (County Road 15) three-quarters of a mile east of Interstate 30, approximately one mile west of the Ouachita River and three miles southwest of Social Hill. Saginaw is 8.3 miles (13.4 km) west-southwest of Malvern.
