= Blakely House (Social Hill, Arkansas) =

Historic house in Arkansas, United States

- U.S. National Register of Historic Places
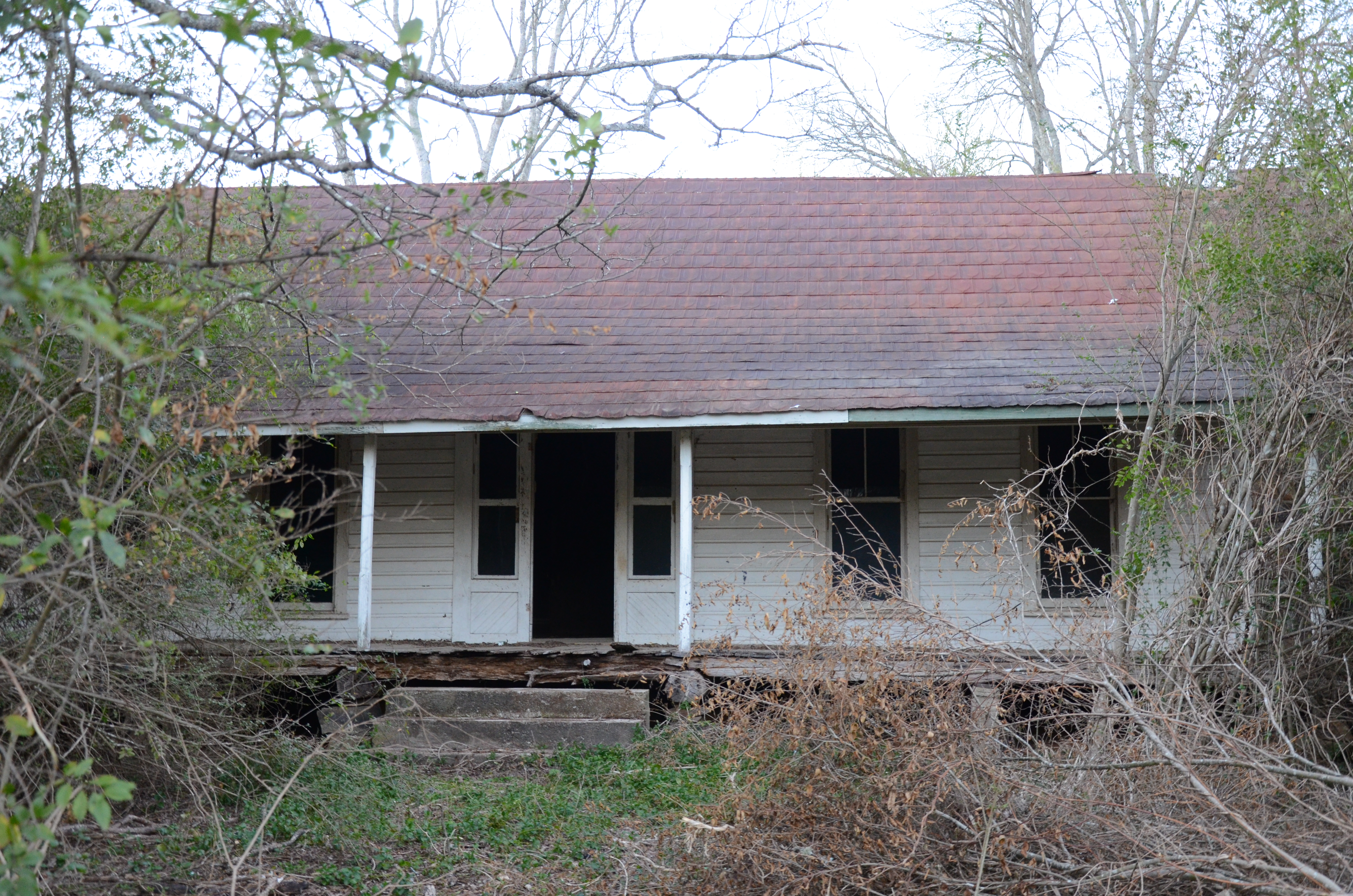

- Location within Arkansas Location within the United States
- Nearest city: Social Hill, Arkansas
- Coordinates: 34°20′6″N 93°1′32″W
- Architect: Blakely, Greenberry
- Architectural style: Dog-trot
- NRHP reference No.: 76002142
- Added to NRHP: May 3, 1976

Blakely House is a dogtrot house located on Arkansas Highway 84 in Social Hill, Arkansas. Greenberry Blakely, one of the first settlers of Hot Spring County, built the house in 1874. The two-room log house is representative of Arkansas homes at the time, as dogtrot houses were popular in the state during the late 1800s. In 1875, Blakely married Martha Ingersell; the couple lived in the home with their two children, Greenberry's mother, and Martha's sister. Blakely placed an addition on the house in 1890 to accommodate his growing family, and in 1890 Blakely sided the home with clapboard. Blakely inhabited the house until his death in 1935.

The house was listed on the National Register of Historic Places in 1976.
