= Hells Halfacre, Kentucky =

Unincorporated community in Kentucky, United States

- Unincorporated community
- Location within Kentucky Location within the United States
- Coordinates: 38°29′52″N 84°23′22″W
- Country: United States
- State: Kentucky
- County: Harrison
- Elevation: 807 ft (246 m)
- Time zone: UTC-5 (Eastern(EST))
  - Summer (DST): UTC-4 (EDT)
- GNIS feature ID: 494008

Hells Halfacre is an unincorporated community located in Harrison County, Kentucky, United States.
