= Hell's Half Acre (Hot Springs, Arkansas) =

34.5341656°N 92.9963123°W Hell's Half Acre is an area of exposed rocks and boulders in a clearing near Hot Springs, Arkansas. In the 1870s there was a hotel nearby and guests would walk a trail to see the site, often referred to as a "bottomless pit". There were also many fanciful stories about a demon being trapped in a cave below. It appeared in postcards and was somewhat of a local natural wonder. It's now completely surrounded by private property.

It was long theorized to be an extinct volcano, however there is no volcanic activity in the area. The nearby Hot Springs are heated through a geothermal process. Also, the rocks themselves are not volcanic but a form of chert common to the Ouachita Mountains. Based on a large amount of preforms, blanks, and rejected cores found near the site it is now theorized this may be an ancient Native American quarry.

== See also ==
- Lake Catherine Quarry: a confirmed Native American chert quarry in Arkansas
