= Shorewood Hills, Arkansas =

Unincorporated community in Arkansas, US

Coordinates: 34°26′15″N 92°53′46″W

Shorewood Hills is an unincorporated community in Garland County, Arkansas, United States. It is the location of two places listed on the National Register of Historic Places:

- Couchwood, Address Restricted, Shorewood Hills
- Little Switzerland (Shorewood Hills, Arkansas), Address Restricted, Shorewood Hills
