= Social Hill, Arkansas =

- Unincorporated community
- Location within Arkansas Location within the United States
- Coordinates: 34°19′55″N 92°54′48″W
- Country: United States
- State: Arkansas
- County: Hot Spring
- Elevation: 344 ft (105 m)
- Time zone: UTC-6 (Central (CST))
  - Summer (DST): UTC-5 (CDT)
- Area code: 501

Social Hill is an unincorporated community in Hot Spring County, Arkansas, United States. Social Hill is located near Interstate 30 and Arkansas Highway 84, 6.1 miles (9.8 km) west-southwest of Malvern. The Ouachita River is one mile to the east of the community.
