= Passmore House =

Historic house in Arkansas, United States

- U.S. National Register of Historic Places
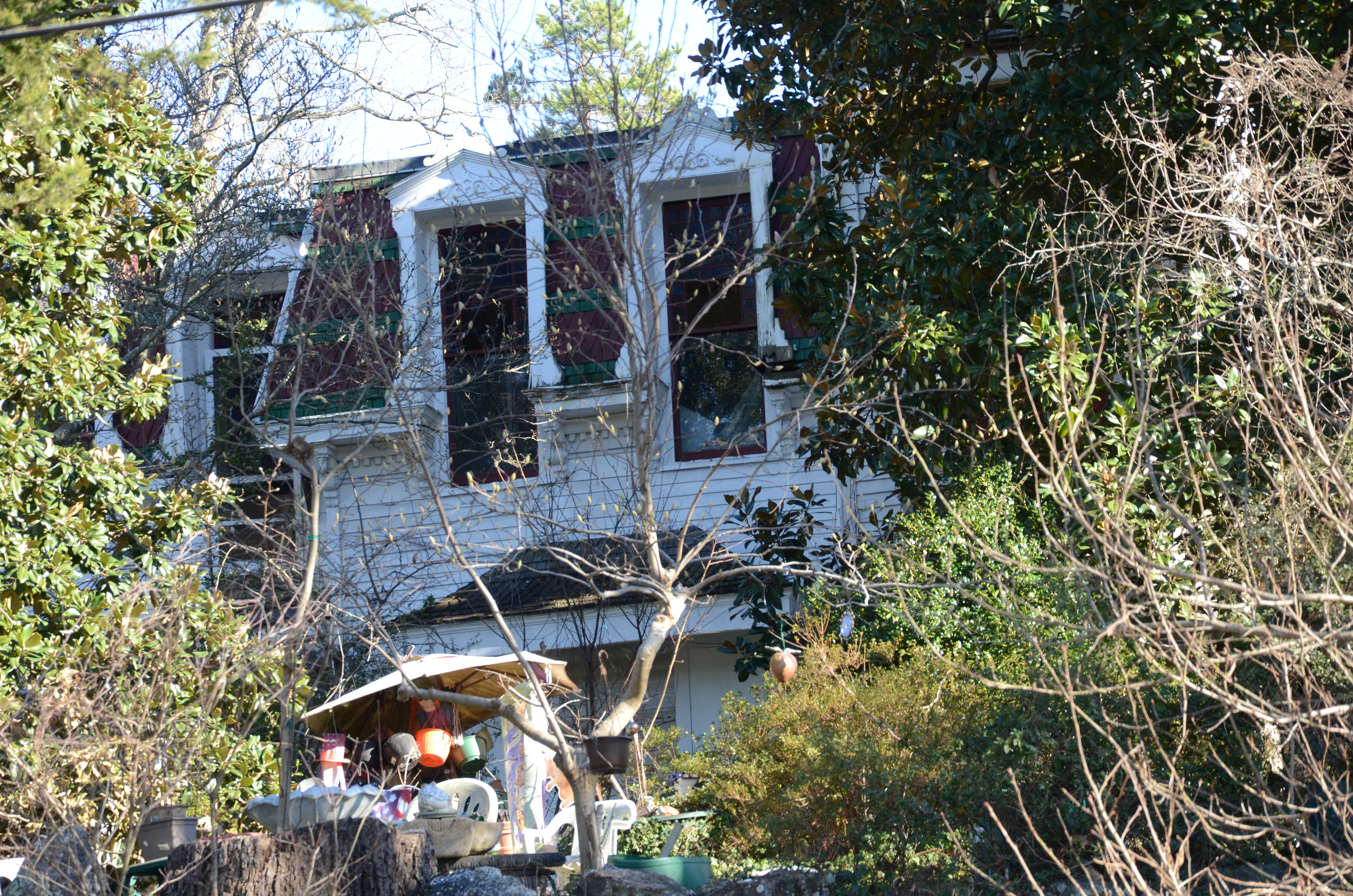
- Passmore House -best view from the street

- Location within Arkansas Location within the United States
- Location: 846 Park Ave., Hot Springs, Arkansas
- Coordinates: 34°31′46″N 93°2′57″W
- Area: less than one acre
- Built: 1873
- Architectural style: Second Empire
- NRHP reference No.: 76000408
- Added to NRHP: October 8, 1976

The Passmore House is a historic house at 846 Park Avenue in Hot Springs, Arkansas. It is a large 1 1/2-story wood-frame structure, with a seven-bay facade topped by a mansard roof with a crested surround and elaborately styled dormers. A central two-story pavilion projects, with a double-door entrance on the first floor, and French doors on the second level that open to a shallow lattice balcony. The house was built in 1873 for Dr. Pauldin Passmore, one of Hot Springs's first doctors, who benefitted from the locality's popularity as a site for the treatment of medical conditions.

The house was listed on the National Register of Historic Places in 1976.

== See also ==
- National Register of Historic Places listings in Garland County, Arkansas
