= Taylor Rosamond Motel Historic District =

Historic district in Arkansas, United States

- U.S. National Register of Historic Places
- U.S. Historic district
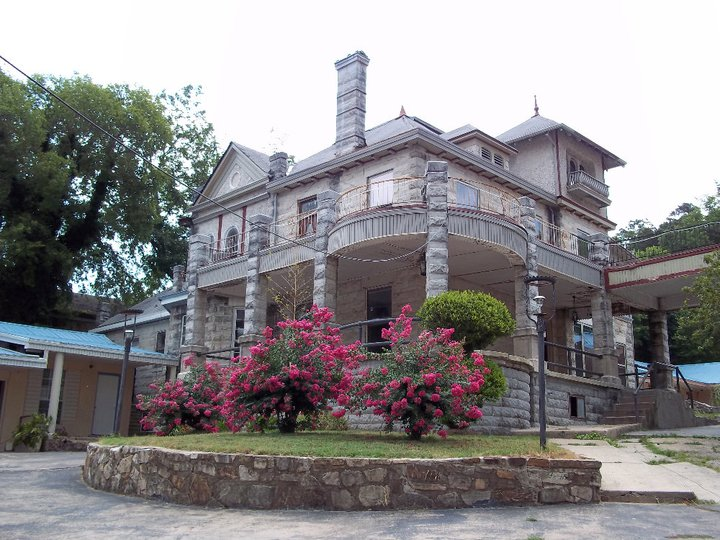

- Location within Arkansas Location within the United States
- Location: 316 Park Ave., Hot Springs, Arkansas
- Coordinates: 34°31′17″N 93°3′17″W
- Area: less than one acre
- Built: 1950
- Architectural style: Italianate, Modern Movement
- MPS: Arkansas Highway History and Architecture MPS
- NRHP reference No.: 04000497
- Added to NRHP: May 26, 2004

The Taylor Rosamond Motel Historic District encompasses two historically significant properties at 316 Park Avenue in Hot Springs, Arkansas. The motel on the site consists of two eight-room buildings, one stepped up the hillside perpendicular to the road, the other near the rear of the property parallel to the road. At the center of the property stands the Italianate stone house of W.S. Sorrell, built sometime between 1908 and 1915, and now used by the motel's owner. The motel, built about 1950, is one of the first to be built in the city, beginning a trend away from the older model of tourist courts.

The property was listed on the National Register of Historic Places in 2004.

== See also ==
- National Register of Historic Places listings in Garland County, Arkansas
