= Langdon Filling Station =

- U.S. National Register of Historic Places
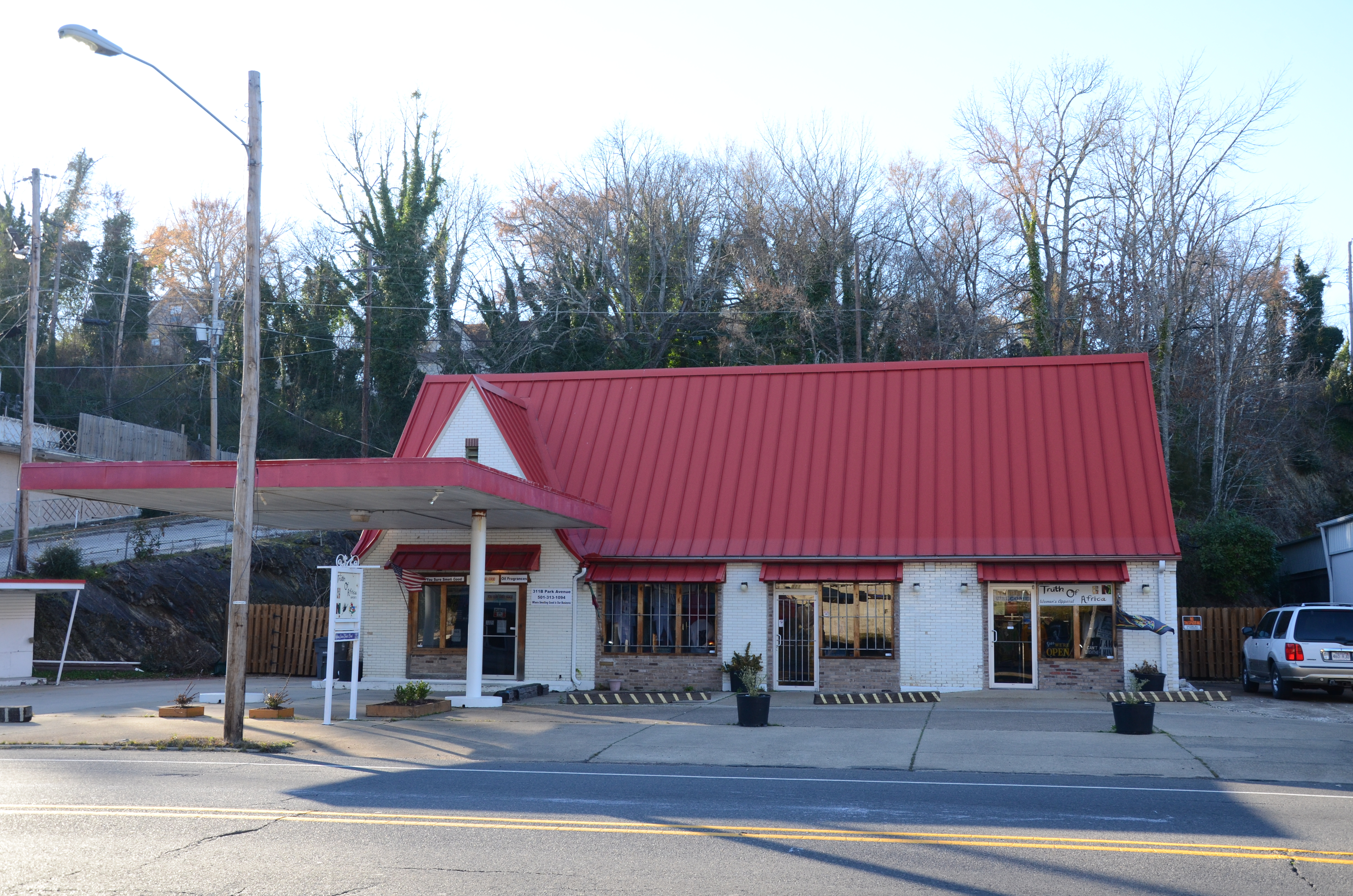

- Location within Arkansas Location within the United States
- Location: 311 Park Ave., Hot Springs, Arkansas
- Coordinates: 34°31′17″N 93°3′17″W
- Area: less than one acre
- Built: 1938
- Architectural style: Tudor Revival
- MPS: Arkansas Highway History and Architecture MPS
- NRHP reference No.: 04000003
- Added to NRHP: February 11, 2004

The Langdon Filling Station is a historic automotive service station at 311 Park Avenue in Hot Springs, Arkansas. It is a single-story masonry building, constructed out of concrete blocks and finished with brick veneer, and houses three service bays and a small office and storage area. The building has a steeply pitched roof with rectangular vents in the English (Tudor) Revival style. Built about 1938, it was used as a service station into the 1990s.

The building was listed on the National Register of Historic Places in 2004.

== See also ==
- National Register of Historic Places listings in Garland County, Arkansas
