= Whittington Park Historic District =

Historic district in Arkansas, United States

- U.S. National Register of Historic Places
- U.S. Historic district
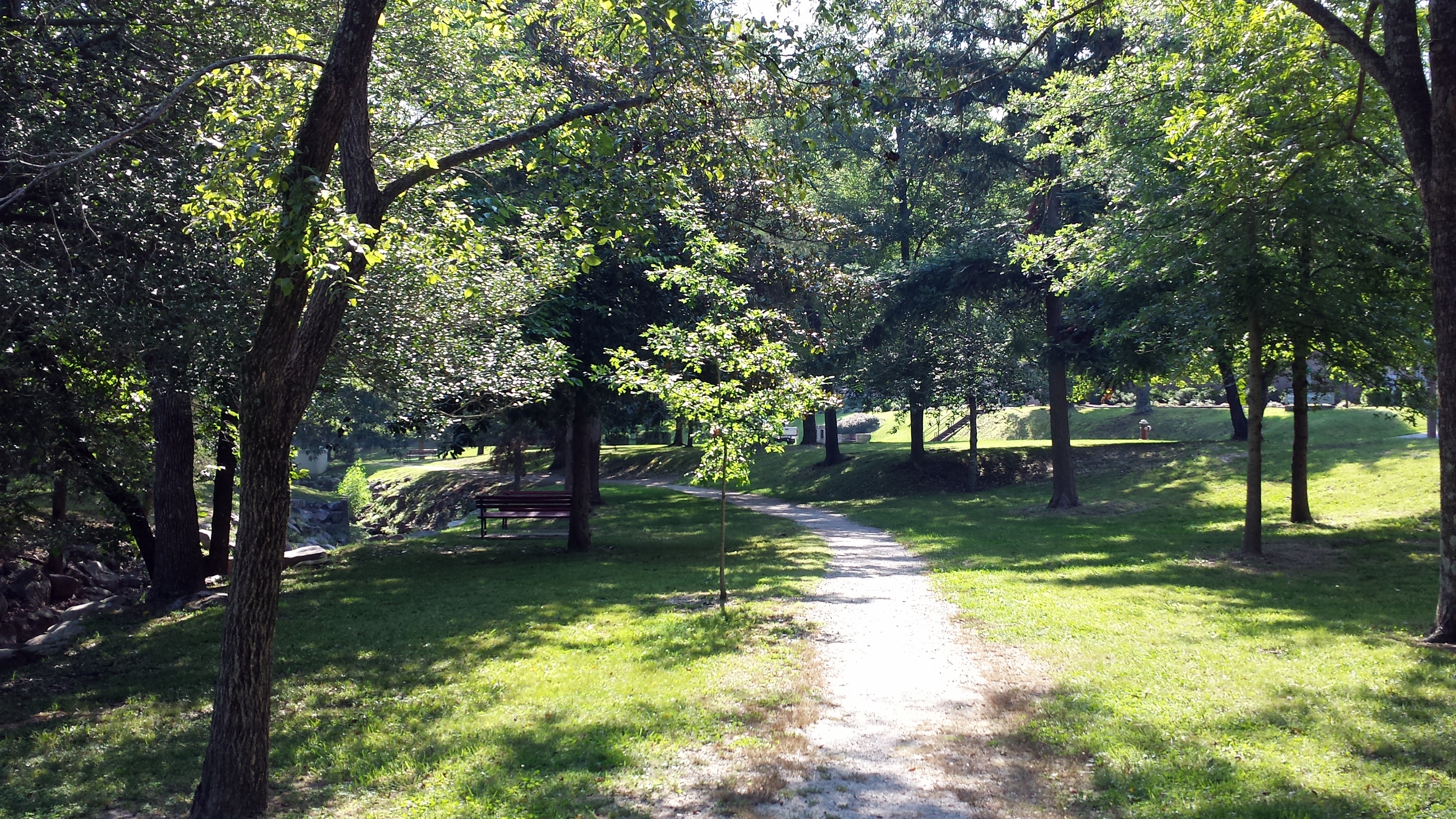
- Whittington Park

- Location within Arkansas Location within the United States
- Location: Roughly bounded by Malvern Av., Pleasant, Church, Gulpha, Garden, Grove and Kirk Sts., Hot Springs, Arkansas
- Coordinates: 34°31′0″N 93°3′57″W
- Area: 46 acres (19 ha)
- Built: 1913
- Architectural style: Craftsman; Queen Anne
- NRHP reference No.: 12001055
- Added to NRHP: December 19, 2012

The Whittington Park Historic District encompasses a mainly residential area in northwestern Hot Springs, Arkansas. The district is centered on Whittington Park, a landscaped design of Frederick Law Olmsted built in the 1890s by the National Park Service. The park is lined to the north and south by a neighborhood built out in two phases, 1920–40 and 1950-1960s. These building periods are represented by a significant number of modest Craftsman and Ranch-style houses, built primarily for people of modest means. There are also several Queen Anne Victorians in the area, the most notable of which stands at 524 Whittington.

The district was listed on the National Register of Historic Places in 2012.

== See also ==
- National Register of Historic Places listings in Garland County, Arkansas
