= Lynwood Tourist Court Historic District =

Historic district in Arkansas, United States

- U.S. National Register of Historic Places
- U.S. Historic district
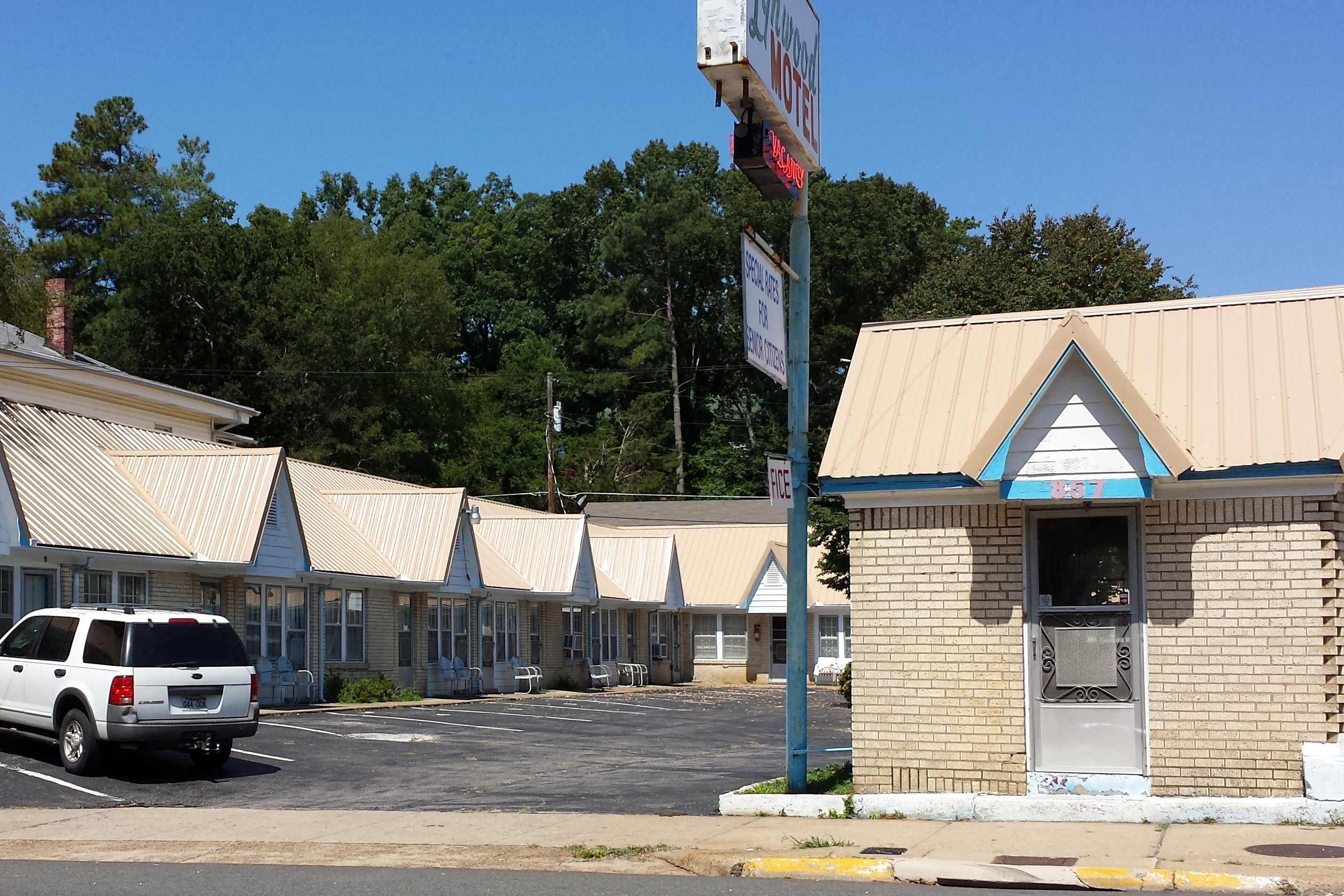

- Location within Arkansas Location within the United States
- Location: 857 Park Ave., Hot Springs, Arkansas
- Coordinates: 34°31′45″N 93°2′58″W
- Area: less than one acre
- Built: 1944
- Architectural style: Tudor Revival
- MPS: Arkansas Highway History and Architecture MPS
- NRHP reference No.: 04000010
- Added to NRHP: February 11, 2004

The Lynwood Tourist Court Historic District encompasses a historic tourist accommodation, now known as the Lynwood Motel, at 857 Park Avenue in Hot Springs, Arkansas, United States. Built about 1944, it is a little-altered example of a 1940s traveler accommodation with English Revival styling. It has sixteen units, each of which originally included a garage (now enclosed to create additional living space), and a small office building. Each unit includes a sleeping area, bathroom, and kitchenette, and is marked on the exterior by a steeply pitched gable.

The district was listed on the National Register of Historic Places in 2004.

== See also ==
- National Register of Historic Places listings in Garland County, Arkansas
