= Hot Springs National Guard Armory =

- U.S. National Register of Historic Places
- Location within Arkansas Location within the United States
- Location: 210 Woodbine St., Hot Springs, Arkansas
- Coordinates: 34°30′14″N 93°3′29″W
- Area: less than one acre
- Built: 1937
- Architectural style: Art Deco
- NRHP reference No.: 100001006
- Added to NRHP: June 5, 2017

The Hot Springs National Guard Armory is a historic military facility at 210 Woodbine Street in Hot Springs, Arkansas. It is a large structure, built out of hollow clay blocks set on a concrete foundation, and topped by a broad gabled roof supported by wooden bowstring trusses. The central gabled portion of the facade is articulated by buttress-like features with Art Deco detailing. The structure was built in 1937, and is one of five Art Deco armories in the state built with funding from the Works Progress Administration, a federal jobs program.

The armory was listed on the National Register of Historic Places in 2017.

== See also ==
- National Register of Historic Places listings in Garland County, Arkansas
