= National Register of Historic Places listings in Garland County, Arkansas =

Location of Garland County in Arkansas

This is a list of the National Register of Historic Places listings in Garland County, Arkansas.

This is intended to be a complete list of the properties and districts on the National Register of Historic Places in Garland County, Arkansas, United States. The locations of National Register properties and districts for which the latitude and longitude coordinates are included below, may be seen in a map.

There are 98 properties and districts listed on the National Register in the county, including 1 National Historic Landmark. Another three properties were once listed but have been removed.

Contents: Counties in Arkansas
- Arkansas
- Ashley
- Baxter
- Benton
- Boone
- Bradley
- Calhoun
- Carroll
- Chicot
- Clark
- Clay
- Cleburne
- Cleveland
- Columbia
- Conway
- Craighead
- Crawford
- Crittenden
- Cross
- Dallas
- Desha
- Drew
- Faulkner
- Franklin
- Fulton
- Garland
- Grant
- Greene
- Hempstead
- Hot Spring
- Howard
- Independence
- Izard
- Jackson
- Jefferson
- Johnson
- Lafayette
- Lawrence
- Lee
- Lincoln
- Little River
- Logan
- Lonoke
- Madison
- Marion
- Miller
- Mississippi
- Monroe
- Montgomery
- Nevada
- Newton
- Ouachita
- Perry
- Phillips
- Pike
- Poinsett
- Polk
- Pope
- Prairie
- Pulaski (Little Rock)
- Randolph
- St. Francis
- Saline
- Scott
- Searcy
- Sebastian
- Sevier
- Sharp
- Stone
- Union
- Van Buren
- Washington
- White
- Woodruff
- Yell

This National Park Service list is complete through NPS recent listings posted September 11, 2026.

== Current listings ==
| | Name on the Register | Image | Date listed | Location | City or town | Description |
|---|---|---|---|---|---|---|
| 1 | Aristocrat Motor Inn | Aristocrat Motor Inn | January 24, 2017 (#100000552) | 240 Central Ave. 34°30′59″N 93°03′13″W | Hot Springs | |
| 2 | Army and Navy General Hospital Historic District | Army and Navy General Hospital Historic District | February 9, 2007 (#05001590) | 105, 200, 417, 421 and 425 Reserve St. 34°30′43″N 93°03′01″W | Hot Springs | |
| 3 | Army & Navy Memorial Lodge | | September 30, 2019 (#100004497) | 570 Job Corps Rd. 34°32′21″N 93°11′48″W | Royal | |
| 4 | Bathhouse Row | Bathhouse Row | November 13, 1974 (#74000275) | Central Ave. between Reserve and Fountain Sts. in Hot Springs National Park; 34°30′50″N 93°03′13″W | Hot Springs | |
| 5 | Walter Beauchamp House | Walter Beauchamp House | May 19, 1994 (#94000470) | 492 Prospect Ave. 34°30′27″N 93°03′37″W | Hot Springs | |
| 6 | Belding-Gaines Cemetery | Belding-Gaines Cemetery | February 25, 1993 (#93000089) | U.S. Route 270; 34°28′06″N 92°58′45″W | Hot Springs | |
| 7 | Bellaire Court Historic District | Bellaire Court Historic District | February 11, 2004 (#04000007) | 637 Park Ave. 34°31′28″N 93°03′11″W | Hot Springs | |
| 8 | W. C. Brown House | W. C. Brown House | October 16, 1986 (#86002862) | 2330 Central Ave. 34°29′21″N 93°03′33″W | Hot Springs | |
| 9 | Buckville Cemetery | Buckville Cemetery | September 27, 2007 (#07000994) | Buckville Rd. 34°36′51″N 93°20′32″W | Avant | |
| 10 | Butchie's Drive-In | Butchie's Drive-In | February 11, 2004 (#04000004) | 534 Park Ave. 34°31′23″N 93°03′13″W | Hot Springs | |
| 11 | Camp Clearfork Historic District | Camp Clearfork Historic District | October 21, 1993 (#93001079) | South of U.S. Route 270 and west of Crystal Springs in the Ouachita National Forest; 34°30′28″N 93°23′36″W | Crystal Springs | |
| 12 | Carpenter Dam | Carpenter Dam | September 4, 1992 (#92001083) | 1398 Carpenter Dam Rd. 34°26′32″N 93°01′33″W | Hot Springs | |
| 13 | CCC Company 3767 Powder Magazine Historic District | | March 30, 2007 (#07000200) | K59P Rd., north of Forest Service Rd. 11 (Gladstone Rd.); 34°45′54″N 93°11′48″W | Jessieville | |
| 14 | Central Methodist Episcopal Church South | Central Methodist Episcopal Church South | September 23, 2011 (#11000689) | 1100 Central Ave. 34°30′17″N 93°03′20″W | Hot Springs | |
| 15 | Charlton Bathhouse | Charlton Bathhouse | October 20, 1993 (#93001080) | North of U.S. Route 270 and west of Crystal Springs in the Ouachita National Forest; 34°31′01″N 93°22′56″W | Crystal Springs | |
| 16 | Charlton Spillway-Dam | Charlton Spillway-Dam | October 21, 1993 (#93001081) | North of U.S. Route 270 and west of Crystal Springs in the Ouachita National Forest; 34°31′03″N 93°22′53″W | Crystal Springs | |
| 17 | Citizens Building | Citizens Building | August 9, 1979 (#79000440) | 723 Central Ave. 34°30′43″N 93°03′51″W | Hot Springs | |
| 18 | City Cemetery | City Cemetery | January 13, 2021 (#100006024) | 740 Adams St. 34°28′49″N 93°02′47″W | Hot Springs | |
| 19 | Cleveland Arms Apartment Building | Cleveland Arms Apartment Building | August 2, 2018 (#100002477) | 2410 Central Ave. 34°29′10″N 93°03′33″W | Hot Springs | |
| 20 | Bill Clinton Boyhood Home | Bill Clinton Boyhood Home | May 18, 1995 (#95000655) | 1011 Park Ave. 34°31′53″N 93°02′45″W | Hot Springs | |
| 21 | Cottage Courts Historic District | Cottage Courts Historic District | February 11, 2004 (#04000005) | 609 Park Ave. 34°31′26″N 93°03′12″W | Hot Springs | |
| 22 | Couchwood | Couchwood | December 4, 1986 (#86003582) | On the grounds of the Couchwood estate, 601 Couchwood Rd. 34°26′58″N 92°54′53″W | Shorewood Hills | Extends into Hot Spring County; listing encompasses artwork of Dionicio Rodriguez on the private estate of Harvey C. Couch. |
| 23 | Couchwood Historic District | Couchwood Historic District | May 17, 2001 (#01000487) | 601 Couchwood Rd. 34°26′50″N 92°54′50″W | Hot Springs | Extends into Hot Spring County; listing encompasses buildings and structures of the private estate of Harvey C. Couch. |
| 24 | Cove Tourist Court | Cove Tourist Court | February 11, 2004 (#04000008) | 771 Park Ave. 34°31′38″N 93°03′05″W | Hot Springs | |
| 25 | Doherty House | Doherty House | November 14, 1978 (#78000587) | 705 Malvern Ave. 34°30′16″N 93°02′53″W | Hot Springs | |
| 26 | Federal Building-U.S. Post Office and Court House | Federal Building-U.S. Post Office and Court House | May 5, 2015 (#15000205) | 100 Reserve St. 34°30′42″N 93°03′14″W | Hot Springs | |
| 27 | First Lutheran Church | First Lutheran Church | May 27, 2015 (#15000282) | 1700 Central Ave. 34°29′46″N 93°03′28″W | Hot Springs | |
| 28 | First Methodist Church Christian Education Building | First Methodist Church Christian Education Building | June 7, 2016 (#16000317) | 1100 Central Ave. 34°30′18″N 93°03′19″W | Hot Springs | |
| 29 | First Presbyterian Church | First Presbyterian Church | December 22, 1982 (#82000817) | 213 Whittington; 34°30′58″N 93°03′33″W | Hot Springs | |
| 30 | Fordyce House | Fordyce House | December 22, 1982 (#82000818) | 746 Park Ave. 34°31′45″N 93°02′58″W | Hot Springs | |
| 31 | Fordyce-Ricks House Historic District | Fordyce-Ricks House Historic District | October 31, 2003 (#03001098) | 1501 Park Ave. 34°32′11″N 93°02′01″W | Hot Springs | |
| 32 | Forest Service Headquarters Historic District | Forest Service Headquarters Historic District | October 20, 1993 (#93001089) | South of the junction of Winona and Indiana Sts. 34°29′32″N 93°03′16″W | Hot Springs | |
| 33 | Forrest Apartments | | January 26, 2024 (#100008989) | 204 Exchange St. 34°30′44″N 93°03′18″W | Hot Springs | |
| 34 | Garland County Courthouse | Garland County Courthouse | December 6, 1979 (#79000441) | Ouachita and Hawthorne Aves; 34°30′17″N 93°03′32″W | Hot Springs | |
| 35 | Gillham House | Gillham House | March 17, 1994 (#94000188) | County Road 584 north of its junction with U.S. Route 270; 34°31′02″N 93°14′28″W | Royal | |
| 36 | Harley E. Green House | Harley E. Green House | July 19, 1979 (#79000439) | North of Bear; 34°32′17″N 93°16′29″W | Bear | |
| 37 | Hill Wheatley Downtowner Motor Inn | Hill Wheatley Downtowner Motor Inn | September 27, 2016 (#16000650) | 135 Central Ave. 34°31′04″N 93°03′18″W | Hot Springs | |
| 38 | Hobson Avenue Historic District | | September 15, 2026 (#100013421) | Roughly either side of Hobson Avenue from 7th Street to 5th Street; 34°29′53″N 93°04′03″W | Hot Springs | |
| 39 | Hollywood Cemetery, Confederate Section | Hollywood Cemetery, Confederate Section | December 6, 1996 (#96001409) | Near the junction of Hollywood Ave. and Mote Rd. 34°29′11″N 93°02′33″W | Hot Springs | |
| 40 | Hot Springs Central Avenue Historic District | Hot Springs Central Avenue Historic District | June 25, 1985 (#85001370) | Central Ave. from Prospect to Park Sts.; also 101 Park Ave. 34°30′53″N 93°03′16″W | Hot Springs | 101 Park represents a boundary increase of September 19, 2007; a boundary decrease was approved July 8, 2019. |
| 41 | Hot Springs Confederate Monument | Hot Springs Confederate Monument | April 26, 1996 (#96000457) | Landmark Plaza, bounded by Market St. and Ouachita and Central Aves. 34°30′28″N 93°03′18″W | Hot Springs | |
| 42 | Hot Springs High School | Hot Springs High School | January 28, 1988 (#87002495) | Oak St. between Orange and Olive Sts. 34°30′19″N 93°03′12″W | Hot Springs | |
| 43 | Hot Springs Masonic Temple | Hot Springs Masonic Temple | March 7, 2022 (#100006532) | 311 West Grand Ave. 34°30′12″N 93°03′17″W | Hot Springs | |
| 44 | Hot Springs National Guard Armory | | June 5, 2017 (#100001006) | 210 Woodbine St. 34°30′14″N 93°03′29″W | Hot Springs | |
| 45 | Hot Springs Railroad Warehouse Historic District | Hot Springs Railroad Warehouse Historic District | May 27, 1996 (#96000526) | 401-439 Broadway; 34°30′17″N 93°03′05″W | Hot Springs | |
| 46 | Humphrey's Dairy Farm | Humphrey's Dairy Farm | July 26, 2012 (#12000275) | 1675 Shady Grove Rd. 34°27′08″N 93°00′03″W | Hot Springs vicinity | |
| 47 | Humphreys-Ryan House | Humphreys-Ryan House | June 2, 2000 (#00000606) | 137 Garland Ave. 34°29′58″N 93°03′28″W | Hot Springs | |
| 48 | Interstate Orphanage | Interstate Orphanage | December 22, 1982 (#82000832) | 339 Combs; 34°29′50″N 93°03′12″W | Hot Springs | |
| 49 | Iron Springs Dam | Iron Springs Dam | October 21, 1993 (#93001090) | Highway 7 north of Jessieville in the Ouachita National Forest; 34°45′43″N 93°04′12″W | Jessieville | |
| 50 | Iron Springs Shelter No. 1 | Iron Springs Shelter No. 1 | October 20, 1993 (#93001091) | Highway 7 north of Jessieville in the Ouachita National Forest; 34°45′41″N 93°04′09″W | Jessieville | |
| 51 | Iron Springs Shelter No. 2 | Iron Springs Shelter No. 2 | October 20, 1993 (#93001092) | Highway 7 north of Jessieville in the Ouachita National Forest; 34°45′40″N 93°04′09″W | Jessieville | |
| 52 | Jack Tar Hotel and Bathhouse | Jack Tar Hotel and Bathhouse | February 21, 2006 (#06000079) | 145 Oriole St. 34°31′45″N 93°02′49″W | Hot Springs | |
| 53 | Dr. Will W. and Helen B. Jackson House | | September 27, 2021 (#100006923) | 132 Lake Hamilton Dr. 34°26′42″N 93°05′10″W | Hot Springs | |
| 54 | Peter Dierks Joers House | Peter Dierks Joers House | November 4, 2009 (#09000773) | 2111 Park Ave. 34°32′37″N 93°01′24″W | Hot Springs | |
| 55 | Jones School | Jones School | May 5, 1988 (#88000517) | Linwood and Hobson Aves. 34°29′51″N 93°03′40″W | Hot Springs | |
| 56 | Peter Joplin Commercial Block | Peter Joplin Commercial Block | March 31, 2000 (#00000294) | 426-432 Ouachita Ave. 34°30′24″N 93°03′30″W | Hot Springs | |
| 57 | King-Neimeyer-Mathis House | King-Neimeyer-Mathis House | September 14, 2002 (#02000955) | 2145 Malvern Rd. 34°28′42″N 93°01′28″W | Hot Springs | |
| 58 | George Klein Tourist Court Historic District | George Klein Tourist Court Historic District | June 8, 1993 (#93000480) | 501 Morrison St. 34°29′42″N 93°03′24″W | Hot Springs | |
| 59 | Kraemer-Harman House | Kraemer-Harman House | October 21, 1999 (#99001258) | 513 2nd St. 34°29′50″N 93°03′46″W | Hot Springs | |
| 60 | Langdon Filling Station | Langdon Filling Station | February 11, 2004 (#04000003) | 311 Park Ave. 34°31′17″N 93°03′17″W | Hot Springs | |
| 61 | Robert E. Lee School | | January 16, 2026 (#100012584) | 134 Rugg Street; 34°30′15″N 93°03′10″W | Hot Springs | |
| 62 | Little Switzerland | | December 4, 1986 (#86003584) | Address Restricted | Shorewood Hills | |
| 63 | Van Lyell House | Van Lyell House | August 31, 2004 (#04000504) | 130 Van Lyell Terrace; 34°26′18″N 93°05′07″W | Hot Springs | |
| 64 | Lynwood Tourist Court Historic District | Lynwood Tourist Court Historic District | February 11, 2004 (#04000010) | 857 Park Ave. 34°31′45″N 93°02′58″W | Hot Springs | |
| 65 | Malco Theatre | Malco Theatre | January 21, 2010 (#09001246) | 817 Central Ave. 34°30′32″N 93°03′15″W | Hot Springs | |
| 66 | William H. Martin House | William H. Martin House | June 11, 1986 (#86001320) | 815 Quapaw Ave. 34°30′15″N 93°03′47″W | Hot Springs | |
| 67 | Medical Arts Building | Medical Arts Building | November 30, 1978 (#78000588) | 236 Central Ave. 34°30′59″N 93°03′14″W | Hot Springs | |
| 68 | Missouri-Pacific Railroad Depot-Hot Springs | Missouri-Pacific Railroad Depot-Hot Springs | June 11, 1992 (#92000611) | Junction of Broadway and Market St. 34°30′27″N 93°03′09″W | Hot Springs | |
| 69 | W. H. Moore House | W. H. Moore House | March 27, 1990 (#90000429) | 906 Malvern St. 34°30′04″N 93°02′44″W | Hot Springs | |
| 70 | Mountainaire Hotel Historic District | Mountainaire Hotel Historic District | February 11, 2004 (#04000013) | 1100 Park Ave. 34°31′50″N 93°02′32″W | Hot Springs | |
| 71 | Old Post Office | Old Post Office | April 12, 1990 (#90000547) | Convention Boulevard; 34°30′27″N 93°02′57″W | Hot Springs | |
| 72 | Opal's Steak House | Opal's Steak House | February 11, 2004 (#04000011) | 871 Park Ave. 34°31′47″N 93°02′56″W | Hot Springs | |
| 73 | Orange Street Presbyterian Church | Orange Street Presbyterian Church | March 28, 2002 (#02000259) | 428 Orange St. 34°30′20″N 93°03′22″W | Hot Springs | |
| 74 | Ouachita Avenue Historic District | Ouachita Avenue Historic District | September 23, 2011 (#11000690) | Bounded by Ouachita Ave., Orange St., Central Ave. & Olive St. 34°30′23″N 93°03′21″W | Hot Springs | |
| 75 | Park Hotel | Park Hotel | December 22, 1982 (#82000819) | 210 Fountain; 34°31′04″N 93°03′05″W | Hot Springs | |
| 76 | Parkway Courts Historic District | Parkway Courts Historic District | February 11, 2004 (#04000009) | 815 Park Ave. 34°31′35″N 93°03′07″W | Hot Springs | |
| 77 | Passmore House | Passmore House | October 8, 1976 (#76000408) | 846 Park Ave. 34°31′46″N 93°02′57″W | Hot Springs | |
| 78 | Perry Plaza Court Historic District | Perry Plaza Court Historic District | February 11, 2004 (#04000012) | 1007 Park Ave. 34°31′50″N 93°02′43″W | Hot Springs | |
| 79 | Plaza Apartments | Plaza Apartments | November 5, 1999 (#99001259) | 610 Spring St. 34°30′45″N 93°02′52″W | Hot Springs | |
| 80 | Pleasant Street Historic District | Pleasant Street Historic District | June 20, 2003 (#03000532) | Roughly bounded by Malvern Ave. and Pleasant, Church, Gulpha, Garden, Grove, and Kirk Sts. 34°30′26″N 93°02′52″W | Hot Springs | |
| 81 | Plunkett-Jarrell Grocer Co. Building | | January 5, 2022 (#100007318) | 150 Creek St. 34°30′25″N 93°03′03″W | Hot Springs | |
| 82 | Quapaw-Prospect Historic District | Quapaw-Prospect Historic District | March 8, 2002 (#99000821) | Roughly bounded by Quapaw and Prospect Aves. 34°30′18″N 93°03′47″W | Hot Springs | |
| 83 | Riviera Hotel | Riviera Hotel | December 22, 1982 (#82000820) | 719 Central; 34°30′32″N 93°03′15″W | Hot Springs | |
| 84 | Charles N. Rix House | Charles N. Rix House | October 15, 1992 (#92001393) | 628 Quapaw Ave. 34°30′22″N 93°03′37″W | Hot Springs | |
| 85 | St. Luke's Episcopal Church | St. Luke's Episcopal Church | December 22, 1982 (#82000821) | Spring and Cottage Sts. 34°30′38″N 93°03′07″W | Hot Springs | |
| 86 | Short-Dodson House | Short-Dodson House | May 3, 1976 (#76000409) | 755 Park Ave. 34°31′39″N 93°03′07″W | Hot Springs | |
| 87 | South Fork Bridge | South Fork Bridge | April 9, 1990 (#90000521) | Off Highway 128 over South Fork; 34°36′11″N 92°55′20″W | Fountain Lake | |
| 88 | Stitt House | Stitt House | May 3, 1976 (#76000410) | 824 Park Ave. 34°31′44″N 93°02′59″W | Hot Springs | |
| 89 | Taylor Rosamond Motel Historic District | Taylor Rosamond Motel Historic District | May 26, 2004 (#04000497) | 316 Park Ave. 34°31′17″N 93°03′17″W | Hot Springs | |
| 90 | Dr. Albert H. Tribble House | | January 24, 2019 (#100003327) | 100 Trivista Right; 34°29′23″N 93°03′29″W | Hot Springs | |
| 91 | Velda Rose Tower Motor Hotel | Velda Rose Tower Motor Hotel | May 10, 2024 (#100010312) | 218 Park Avenue; 34°31′16″N 93°03′20″W | Hot Springs | |
| 92 | Visitors Chapel AME | Visitors Chapel AME | June 2, 1995 (#95000682) | 319 Church St. 34°30′31″N 93°03′01″W | Hot Springs | |
| 93 | Wade Building | Wade Building | December 22, 1982 (#82000822) | 231 Central; 34°31′01″N 93°03′13″W | Hot Springs | |
| 94 | Whittington Park Historic District | Whittington Park Historic District | December 19, 2012 (#12001055) | Whittington Ave. & Sabie St. between Water & Woodfin Sts. 34°31′00″N 93°03′57″W | Hot Springs | |
| 95 | Wildwood | Wildwood | October 8, 1976 (#76000411) | 808 Park Ave. 34°31′42″N 93°03′00″W | Hot Springs | |
| 96 | Hamp Williams Building | Hamp Williams Building | September 20, 2007 (#07000972) | 500-504 Ouachita Ave. 34°30′26″N 93°03′32″W | Hot Springs | |
| 97 | Williams-Wootton House | Williams-Wootton House | November 30, 1978 (#78000589) | 420 Quapaw Ave. 34°30′23″N 93°03′35″W | Hot Springs | |
| 98 | Woodmen of Union Building | Woodmen of Union Building | June 27, 1997 (#97000616) | 501 Malvern Ave. 34°30′25″N 93°02′58″W | Hot Springs | |

== Former listing ==
| | Name on the Register | Image | Date listed | Date removed | Location | City or town | Description |
|---|---|---|---|---|---|---|---|
| 1 | Greenwood School | | January 26, 2018 (#100001995) | January 3, 2022 | 1425 Greenwood Ave. 34°29′40″N 93°04′33″W | Hot Springs | Demolished in November, 2020 |
| 2 | Mayberry Springs | | September 5, 1990 (#90001379) | May 9, 2022 | U.S. Route 270; 34°31′01″N 93°18′06″W | Crystal Springs | Burned down |
| 3 | Wheatley Courts | | February 11, 2004 (#04000006) | September 29, 2015 | 811 Park Ave. 34°31′42″N 93°03′02″W | Hot Springs | Also known as the Kloss Motel. Demolished in 2015. |

== See also ==
- List of National Historic Landmarks in Arkansas
- National Register of Historic Places listings in Arkansas
