= First Lutheran Church (Hot Springs, Arkansas) =

Historic church in Arkansas, United States

- U.S. National Register of Historic Places
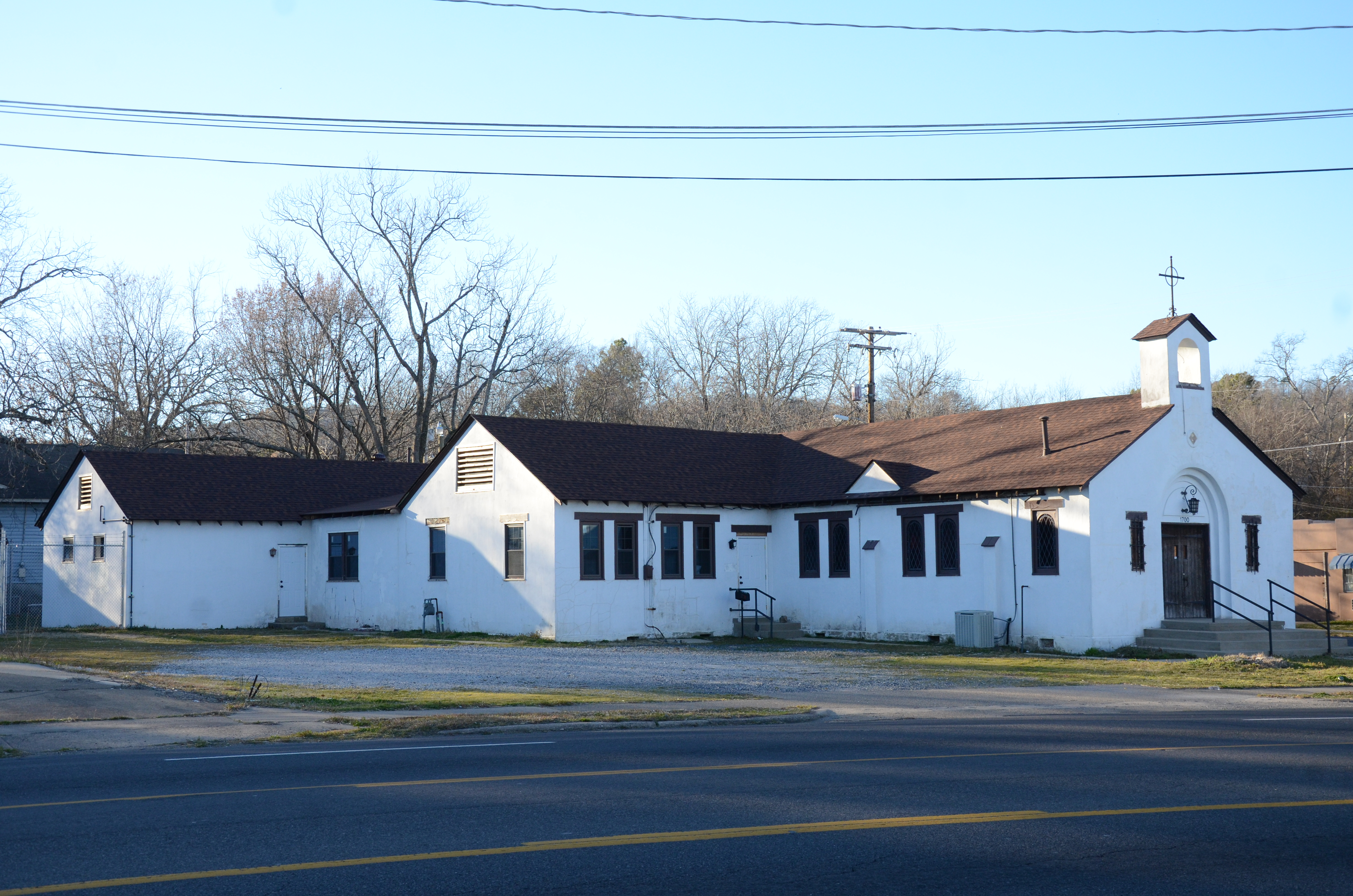

- Location within Arkansas Location within the United States
- Location: 1700 Central Ave., Hot Springs, Arkansas
- Coordinates: 34°29′46″N 93°3′28″W
- Area: less than one acre
- Built: 1937
- Architect: Carl F. Schloemann
- Architectural style: Mission Revival
- NRHP reference No.: 15000282
- Added to NRHP: May 27, 2015

The First Lutheran Church is a historic church building at 1700 Central Avenue in Hot Springs, Arkansas. It is a single story structure with a stuccoed exterior and a long gabled roof. Its main facade, facing east, has a centered entrance set in a stepped back rounded arch, with flanking windows that have ornamental ironwork on the outside. An open belltower rises at the peak of the gable above the entrance. Built in 1937 to a design by St. Louis architect Carl F. Schloemann, it is a distinctive late example of Mission Revival architecture in the city. The Lutheran congregation for which it was built was established in 1915; the building was sold into private ownership in 1985.

The church was listed on the National Register of Historic Places in 2015.

== See also ==
- National Register of Historic Places listings in Garland County, Arkansas
