= King-Neimeyer-Mathis House =

Historic house in Arkansas, United States

- U.S. National Register of Historic Places
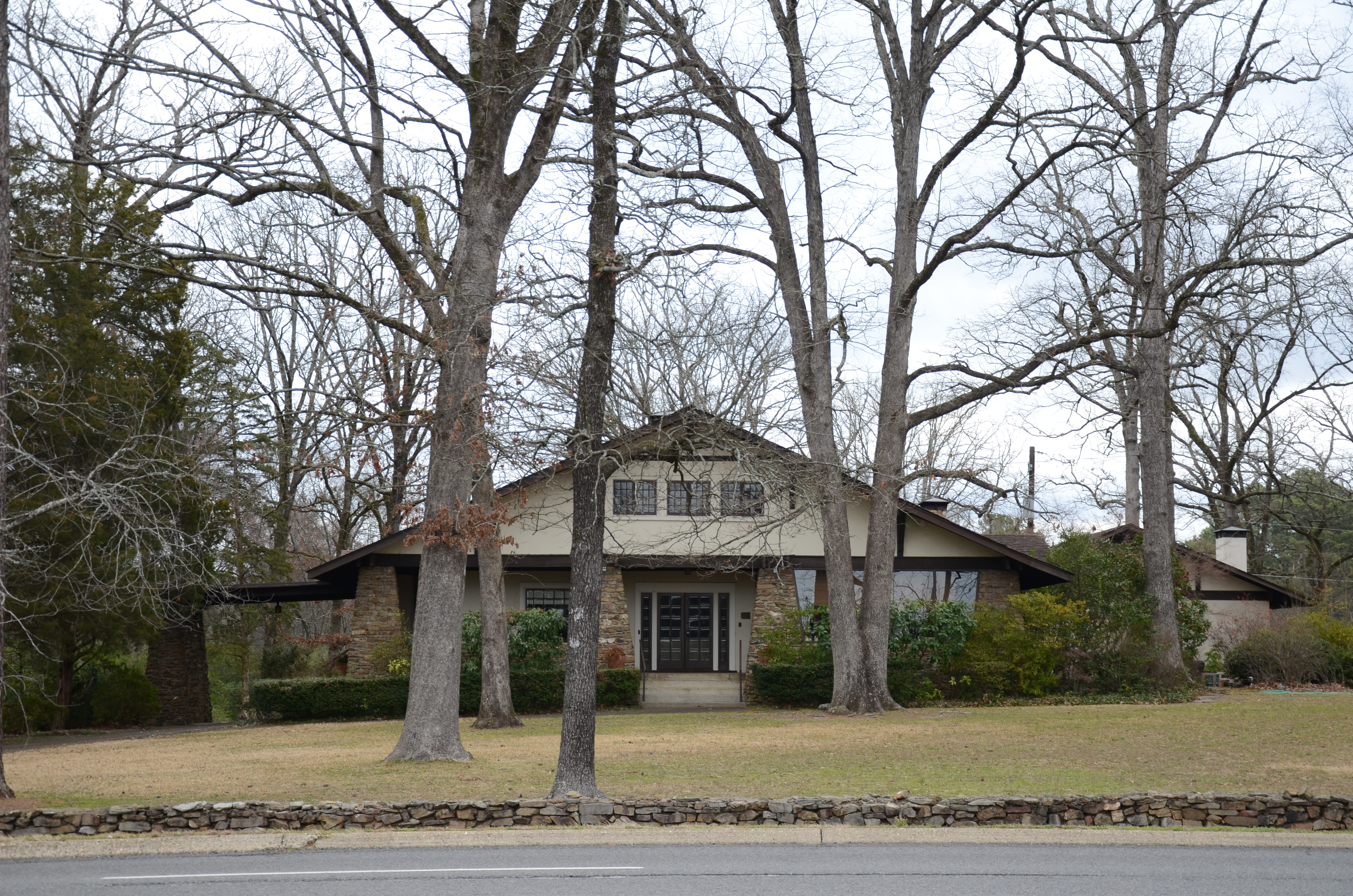

- Location within Arkansas Location within the United States
- Location: 2145 Malvern Rd., Hot Springs, Arkansas
- Coordinates: 34°28′42″N 93°1′28″W
- Area: 7.7 acres (3.1 ha)
- Built: 1918
- Architectural style: Bungalow/craftsman
- NRHP reference No.: 02000955
- Added to NRHP: September 14, 2002

The King-Neimeyer-Mathis House is a historic house at 2145 Malvern Road in Hot Springs, Arkansas, opposite the Hot Springs Golf Club. It is a 1 1/2-story Craftsman style house, with a broad shallow-pitch gable roof. Originally built outside the city, the city's growth has brought it within the city limits, but it still stands on more than 7 acres (2.8 ha), along with a number of agricultural outbuildings. The house was built in 1917-18 by D. D. King as a summer house, apparently due in part to its proximity to the golf club.

The house was listed on the National Register of Historic Places in 2002.

== See also ==
- National Register of Historic Places listings in Garland County, Arkansas
