= Humphrey's Dairy Farm =

Historic house in Arkansas, United States

- U.S. National Register of Historic Places
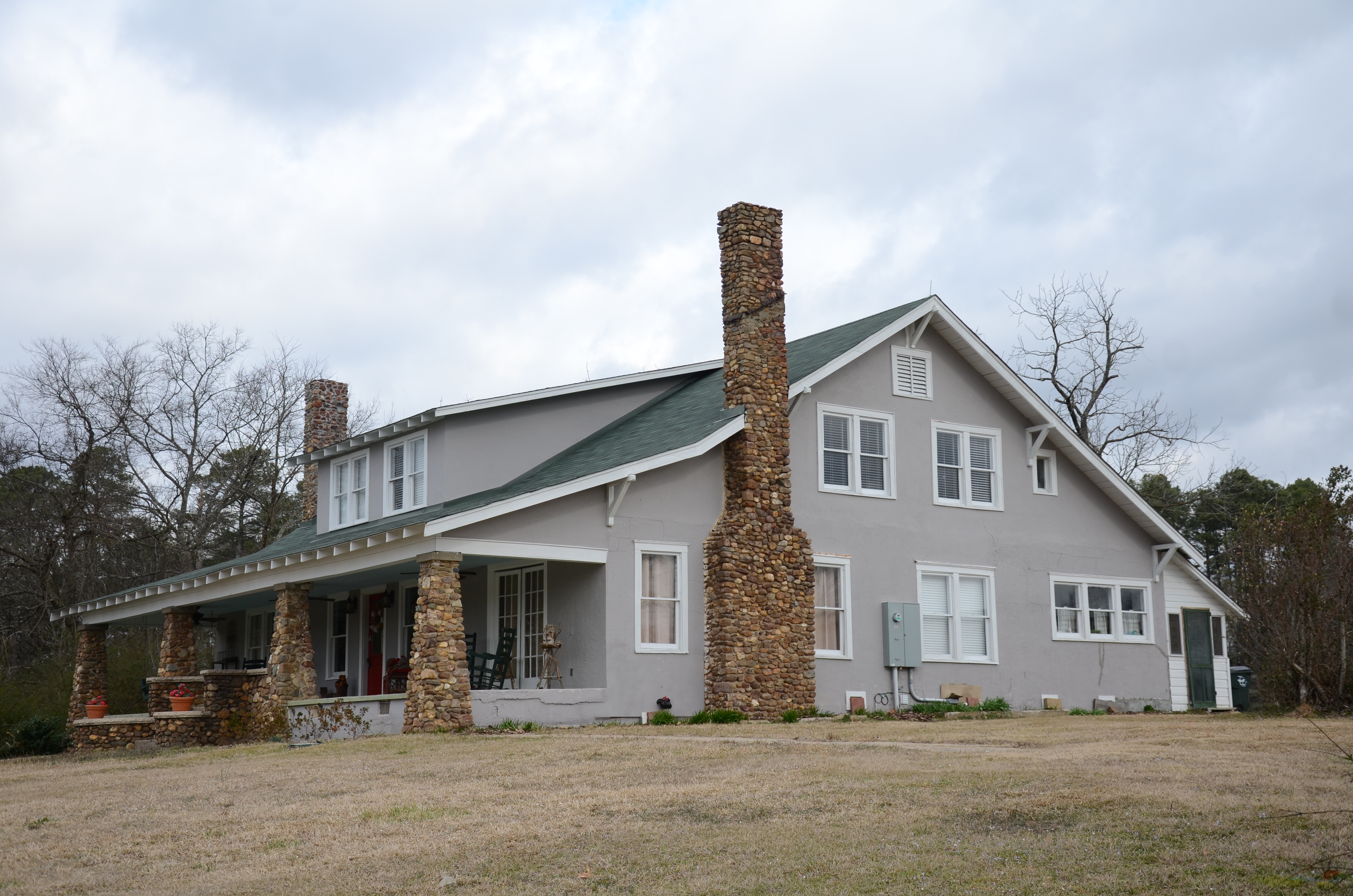
- Craftsman house c.1920, the main building of the Humphrey's Dairy Farm complex

- Location within Arkansas Location within the United States
- Location: 1675 Shady Grove Rd., near Hot Springs, Arkansas
- Coordinates: 34°27′8″N 93°0′3″W
- Area: 14 acres (5.7 ha)
- Built: c. 1911
- Architectural style: Craftsman
- NRHP reference No.: 12000275
- Added to NRHP: July 26, 2012

Humphrey's Dairy Farm is a historic farm property at 1675 Shady Grove Road in Garland County, Arkansas, several miles southeast of Hot Springs. The farm is now a 12-acre (4.9 ha) remnant of a property that was once more than 400 acres (160 ha). The farm complex is set on the north side of the road, and includes a large Craftsman house, built about 1920, a derelict gambrel-roofed barn of similar vintage, and a dairy processing plant built about 1930. The farm was started by Harris Humphrey in 1911, and was for many years an important local supplier to the Hot Springs market.

The farm was listed on the National Register of Historic Places in 2012.

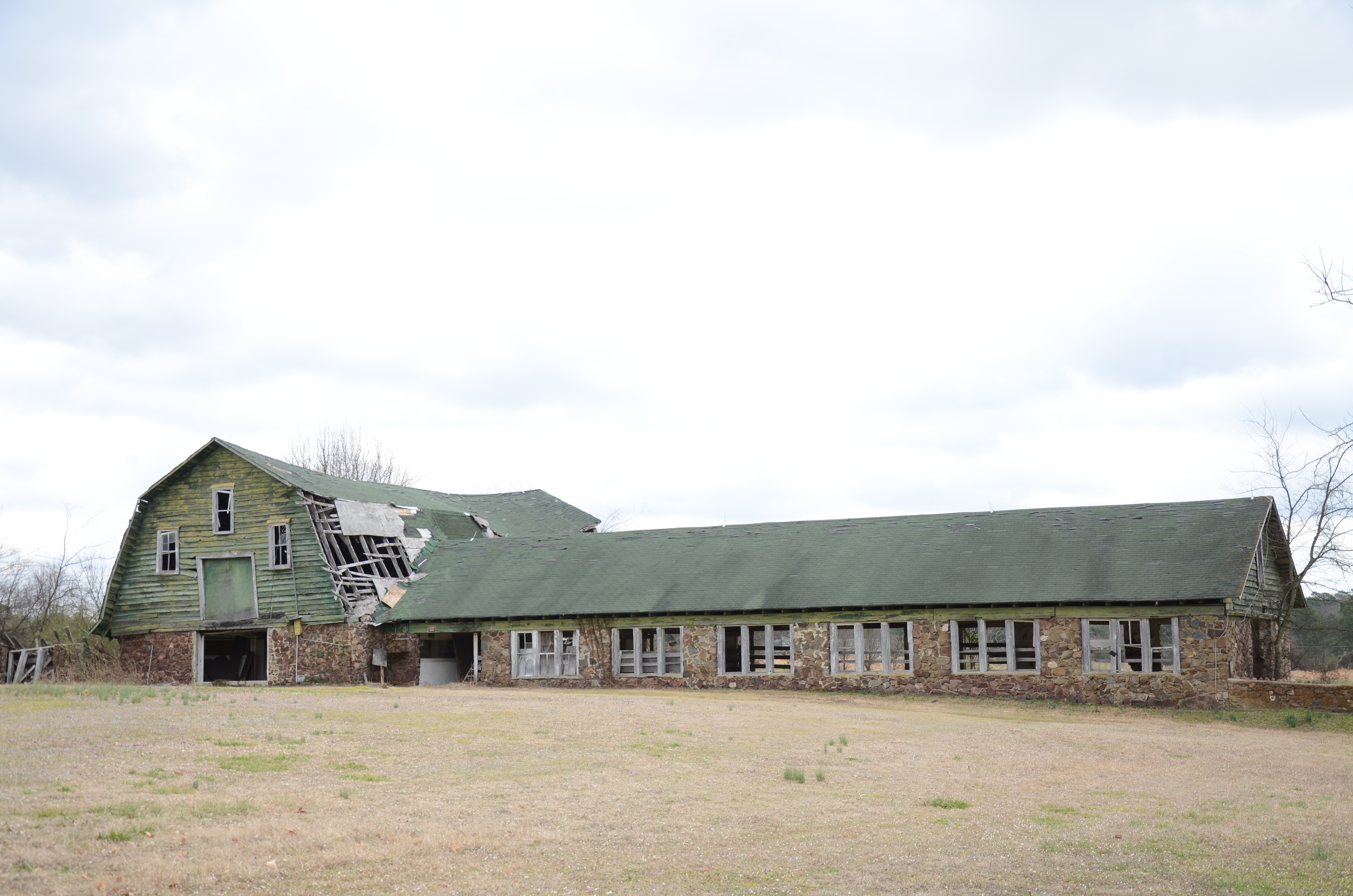
Derelict building side view

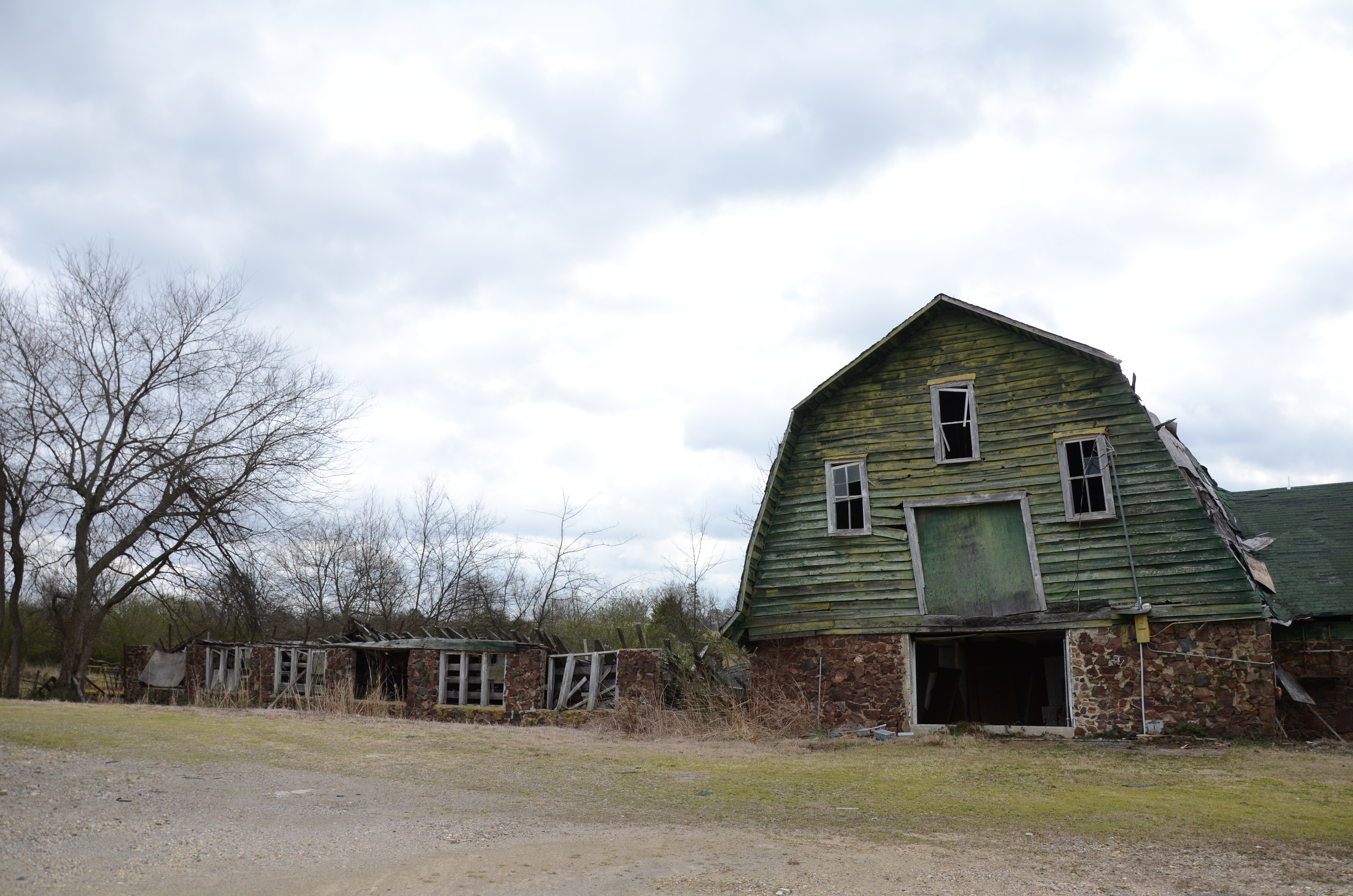
Derelict gambrel-roofed barn

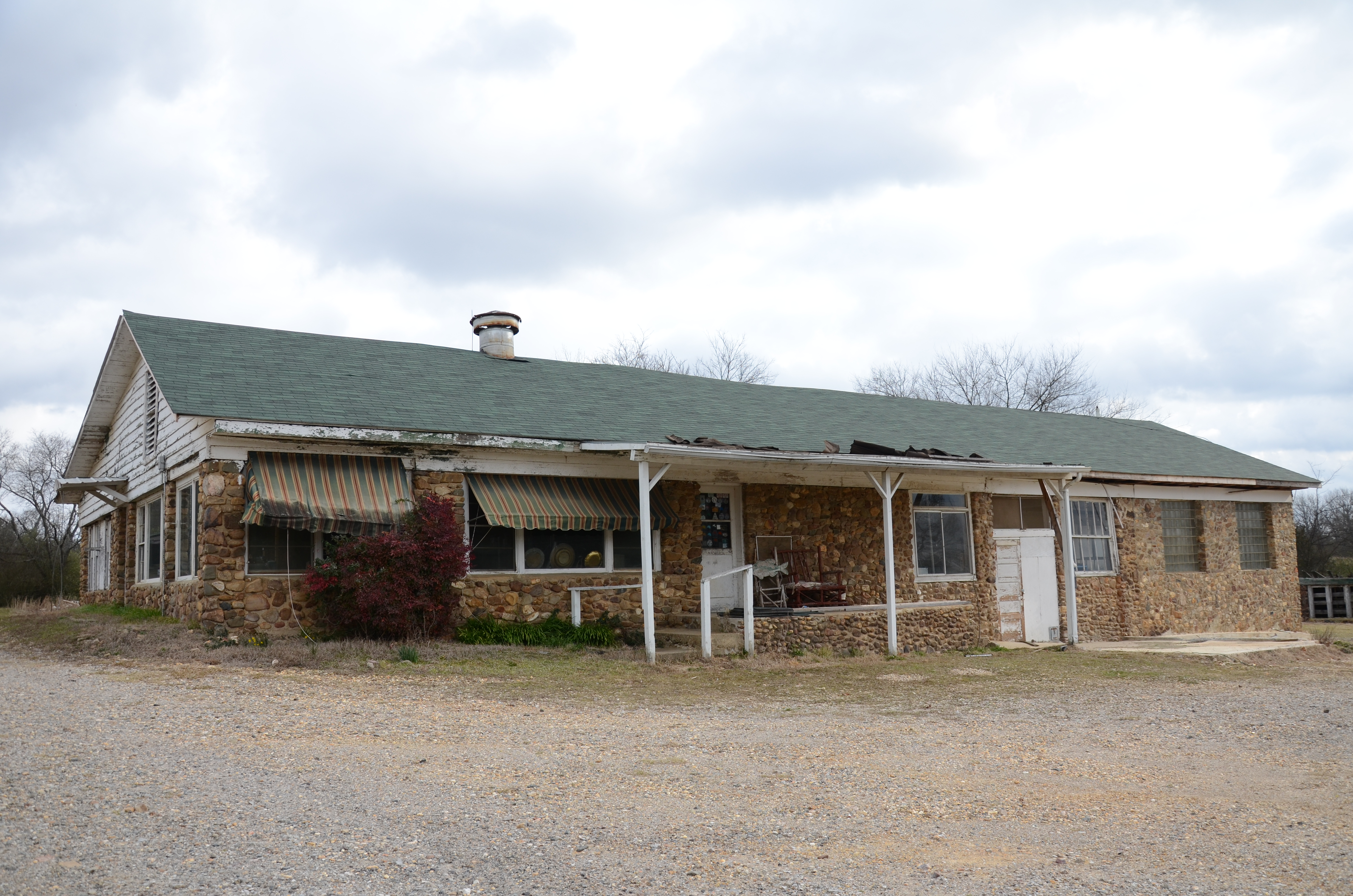
Farm building

== See also ==
- National Register of Historic Places listings in Garland County, Arkansas
