= Cottage Courts Historic District =

Historic district in Arkansas, United States

- U.S. National Register of Historic Places
- U.S. Historic district
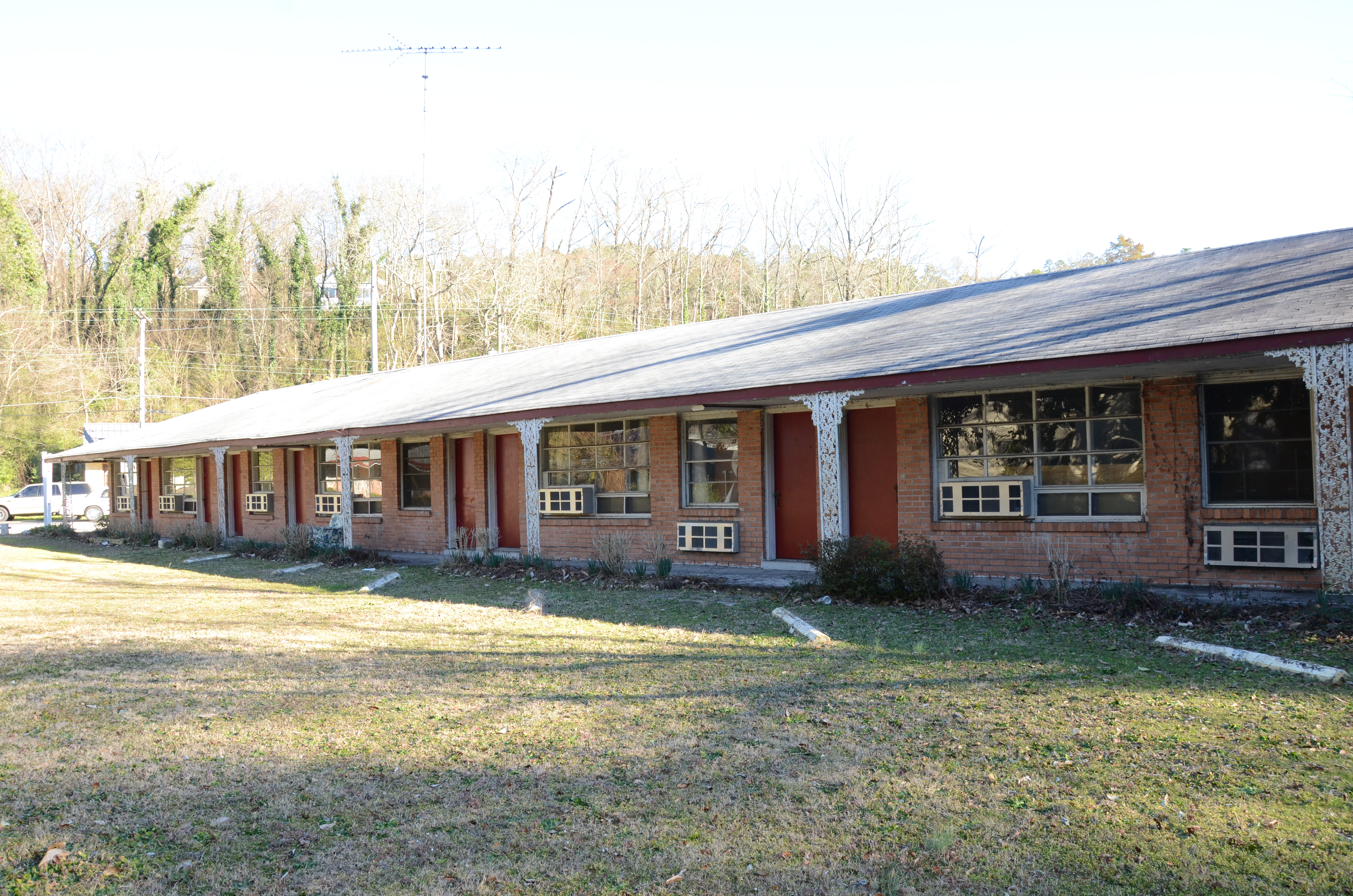

- Location within Arkansas Location within the United States
- Location: 609 Park Ave., Hot Springs, Arkansas
- Coordinates: 34°31′26″N 93°3′12″W
- Area: less than one acre
- Built: 1950
- Architectural style: Ranch
- MPS: Arkansas Highway History and Architecture MPS
- NRHP reference No.: 04000005
- Added to NRHP: February 11, 2004

The Cottage Courts Historic District encompasses a historic travelers' accommodation at 609 Park Avenue in Hot Springs, Arkansas. Built about 1950, it was one of the first motel-type tourist accommodations to be built in the city. Unlike earlier tourist courts, which typically had idiosyncratic vernacular architecture, Cottage Courts consists of two ranch-style single-story buildings, one of which houses twelve guest rooms, and the other three plus the operator's apartment and office.

The property was listed on the National Register of Historic Places in 2004.

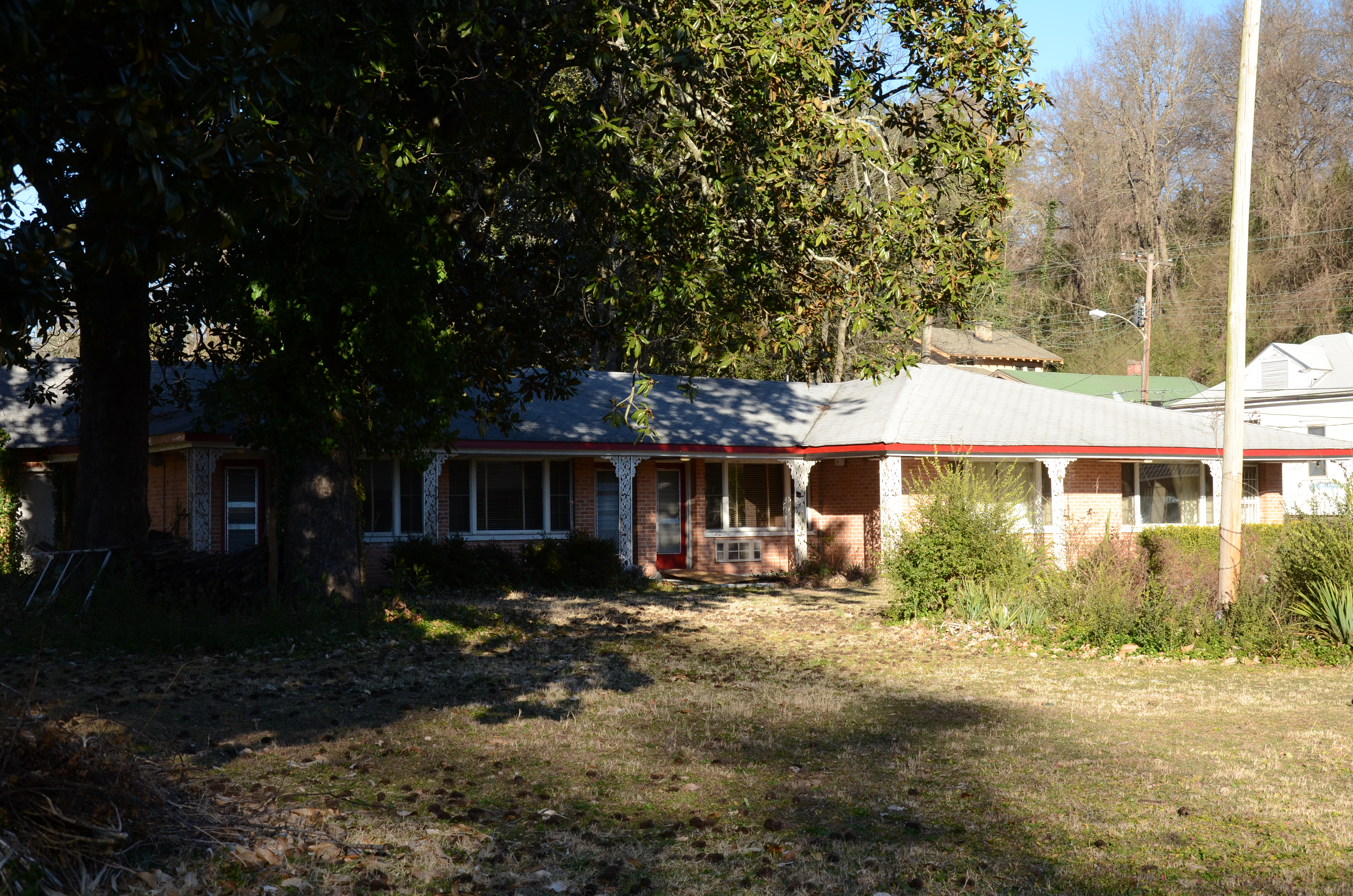
Cottage Courts

== See also ==
- National Register of Historic Places listings in Garland County, Arkansas
