= Citizens Building (Hot Springs, Arkansas) =

- U.S. National Register of Historic Places
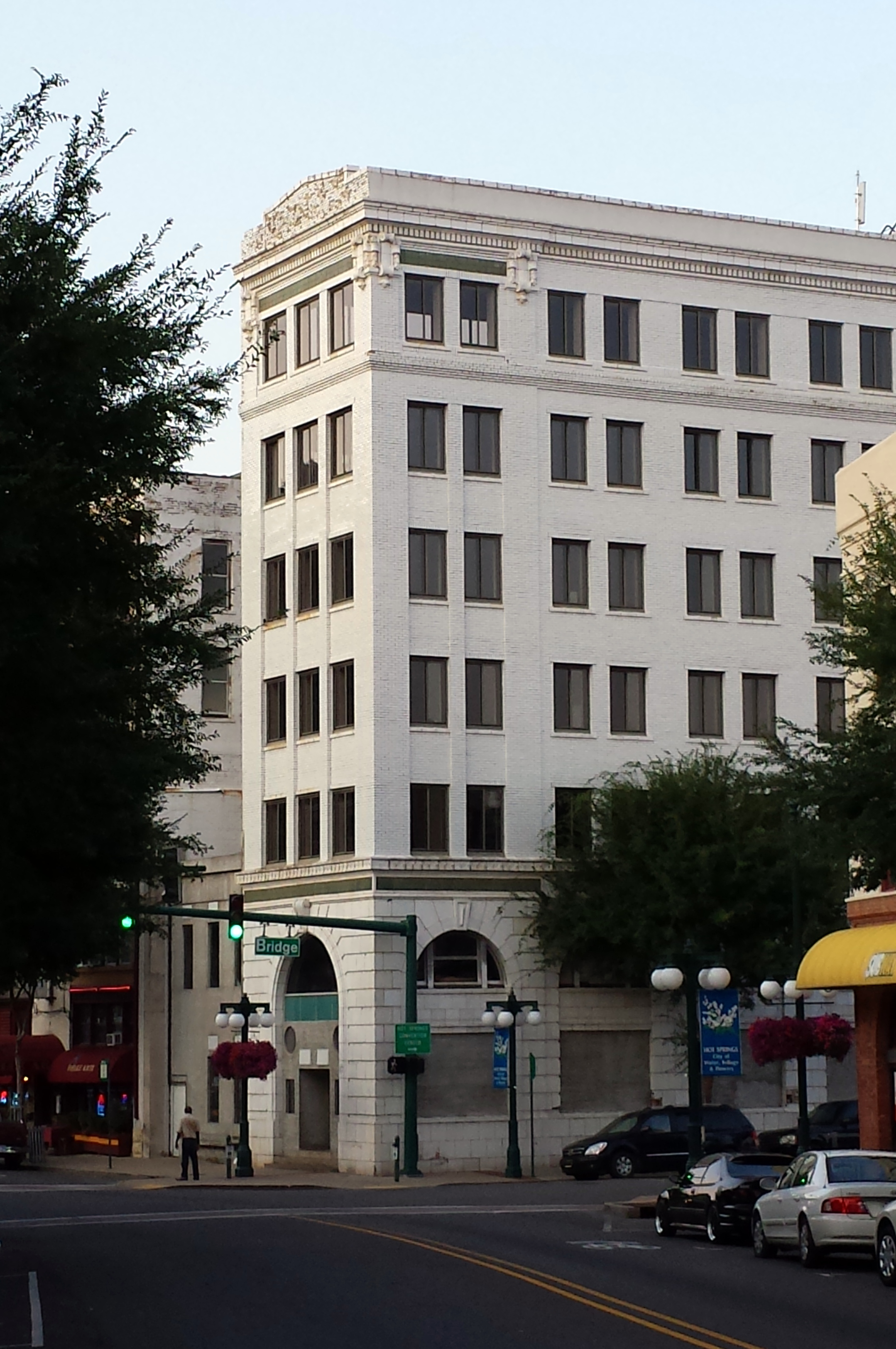

- Location within Arkansas Location within the United States
- Location: 723 Central Ave., Hot Springs, Arkansas
- Coordinates: 34°30′43″N 93°3′51″W
- Area: less than one acre
- Built: 1911
- NRHP reference No.: 79000440
- Added to NRHP: August 9, 1979

The Citizens Building is a historic commercial building at 723 Central Avenue in Hot Springs, Arkansas. It is a narrow six-story steel and masonry structure, built in 1911–12. It was the first skyscraper to be built in Hot Springs, and was immediately noted for its dignified exterior. The first floor consists of a colonnade of stone arches, above which four identical floors rise, finished in white glazed brick manufactured by the Leon Tiffany Company. The top floor is set off from the lower floors by a band of corbelling, and is topped by a dentillated cornice.

The building was listed on the National Register of Historic Places in 1979.

== See also ==
- National Register of Historic Places listings in Garland County, Arkansas
