= Bellaire Court Historic District =

Tourist court cottage complex in Hot Springs, Arkansas, USA

- U.S. National Register of Historic Places
- U.S. Historic district
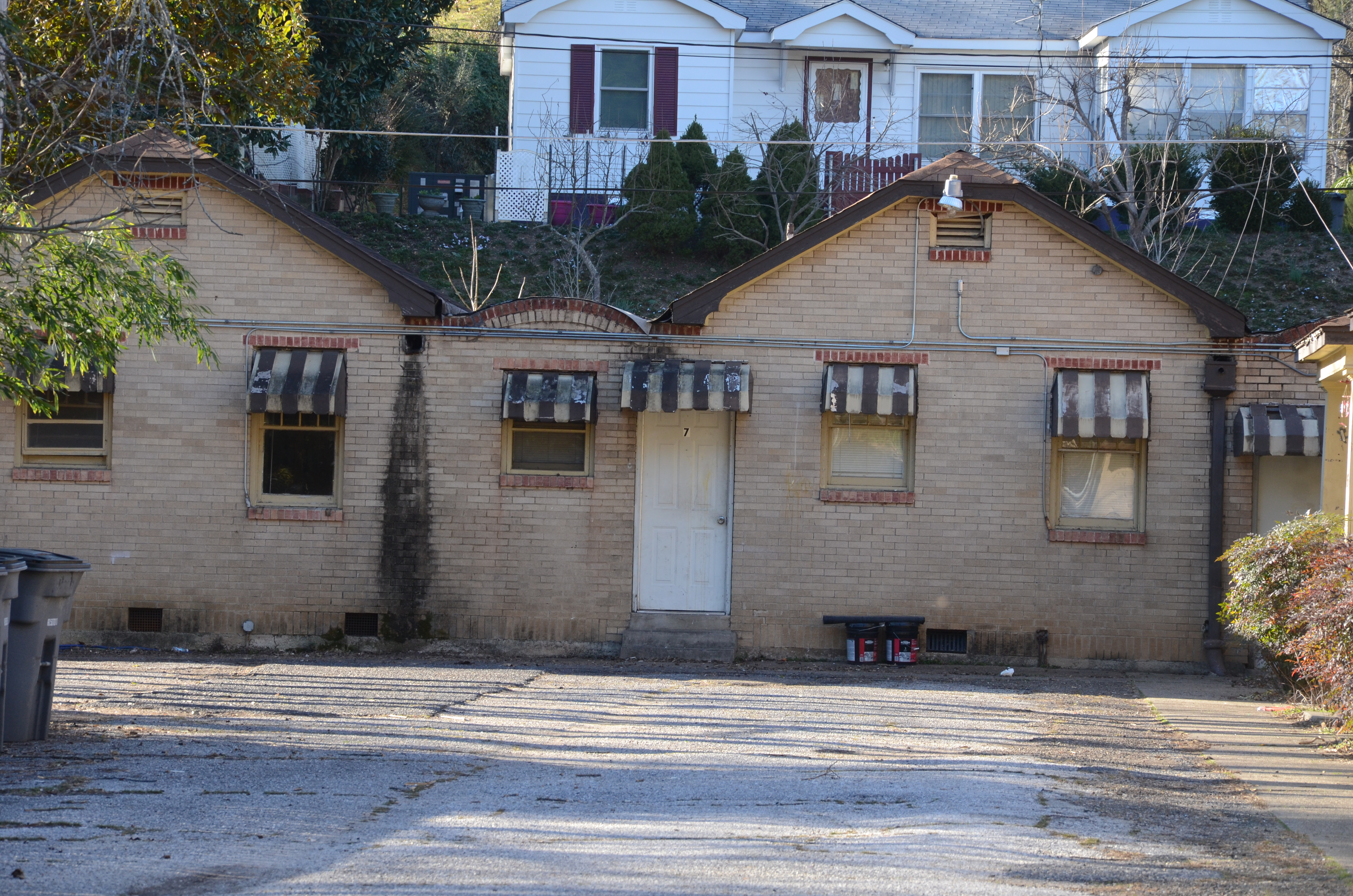

- Location within Arkansas Location within the United States
- Location: 637 Park Ave., Hot Springs, Arkansas
- Coordinates: 34°31′28″N 93°3′11″W
- Area: less than one acre
- Built: 1936
- Architectural style: Bungalow/craftsman
- MPS: Arkansas Highway History and Architecture MPS
- NRHP reference No.: 04000007
- Added to NRHP: February 11, 2004

The Bellaire Court Historic District encompasses a former tourist court cottage complex at 637 Park Avenue in Hot Springs, Arkansas. The complex was built in the 1930s, when the advent of vacation travel by automobile rose to prominence. The complex is roughly L-shaped, with a long leg of the L perpendicular to the road, and the short leg at the rear, facing Magnolia Street. It is a single story structure with Craftsman styling, built out of wood and finished in stone veneer and brick trim. At the front of the complex is a manager's house, with cottage-style units lined behind it, each with a space that was originally a garage, but has since been filled in as part of a conversion to full-time residential units.

The complex was listed on the National Register of Historic Places in 2004.

== See also ==
- National Register of Historic Places listings in Garland County, Arkansas
