= Cleveland Arms Apartment Building =

Historic building in Arkansas, US

- U.S. National Register of Historic Places
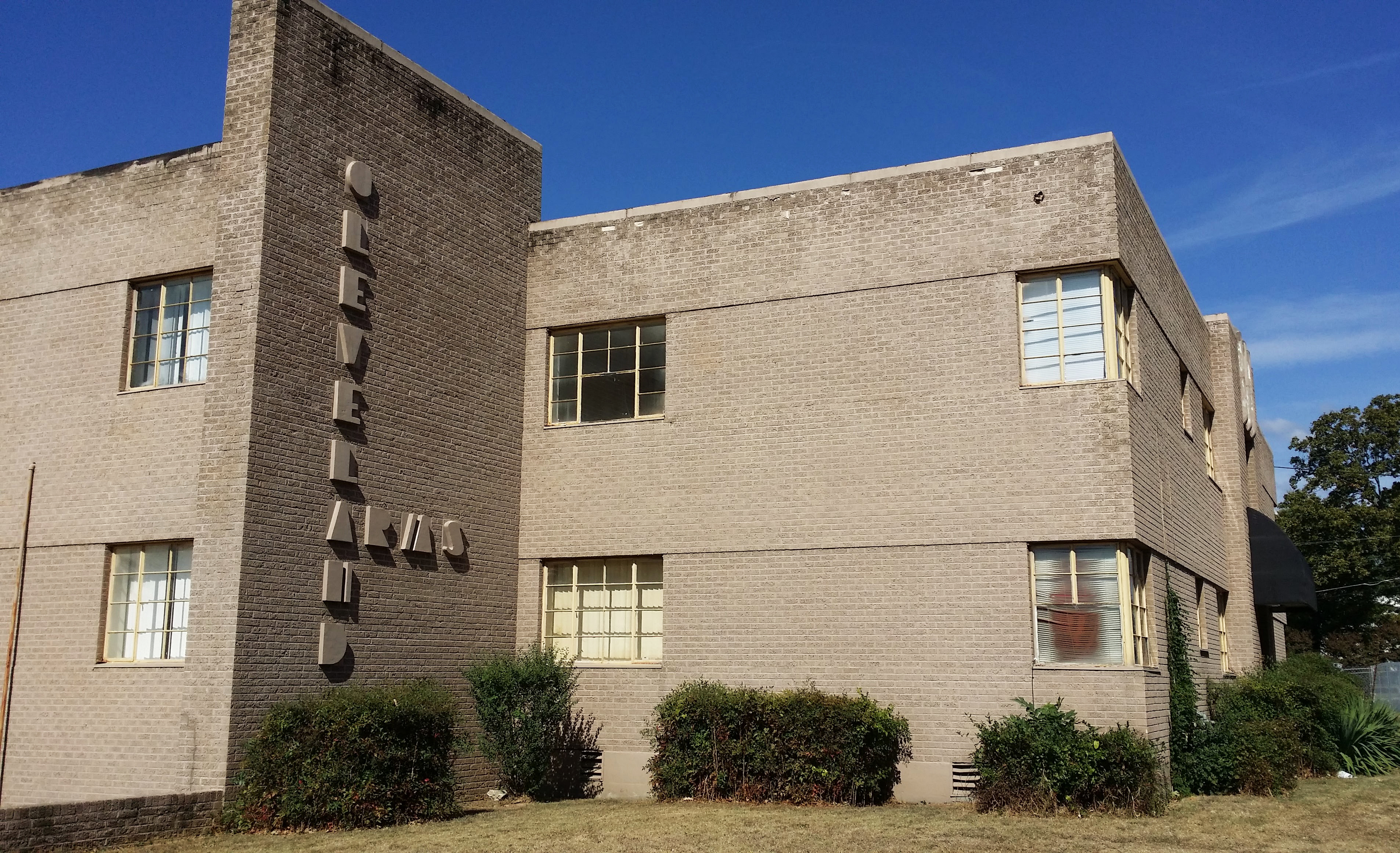
- Cleveland Arms in 2015

- Location within Arkansas Location within the United States
- Location: 2410 Central Ave., Hot Springs, Arkansas
- Coordinates: 34°29′10″N 93°3′33″W
- Area: less than one acre
- Built: c.1945
- Architectural style: Art Moderne; Art Deco
- NRHP reference No.: 100002477
- Added to NRHP: August 2, 2018

The Cleveland Arms Apartment Building is a historic residential building at 2410 Central Avenue in Hot Springs, Arkansas. It is an L-shaped three-story building, finished in brick veneer. Its entrances are framed by a simplified Art Deco surround, and the Oakwood Street facade is adorned with the words "Cleveland Arms" in Art Deco lettering. It was built about 1945 through the effort of Thomas Cleveland, owner of a local insurance company, and was built using funding support from the Federal Housing Administration as housing for returning war veterans. It was designed by I.D. McDaniel, a local architect.

The building was listed on the National Register of Historic Places in 2018.

== See also ==
- National Register of Historic Places listings in Garland County, Arkansas
