= Humphreys-Ryan House =

Historic house in Arkansas, United States

- U.S. National Register of Historic Places
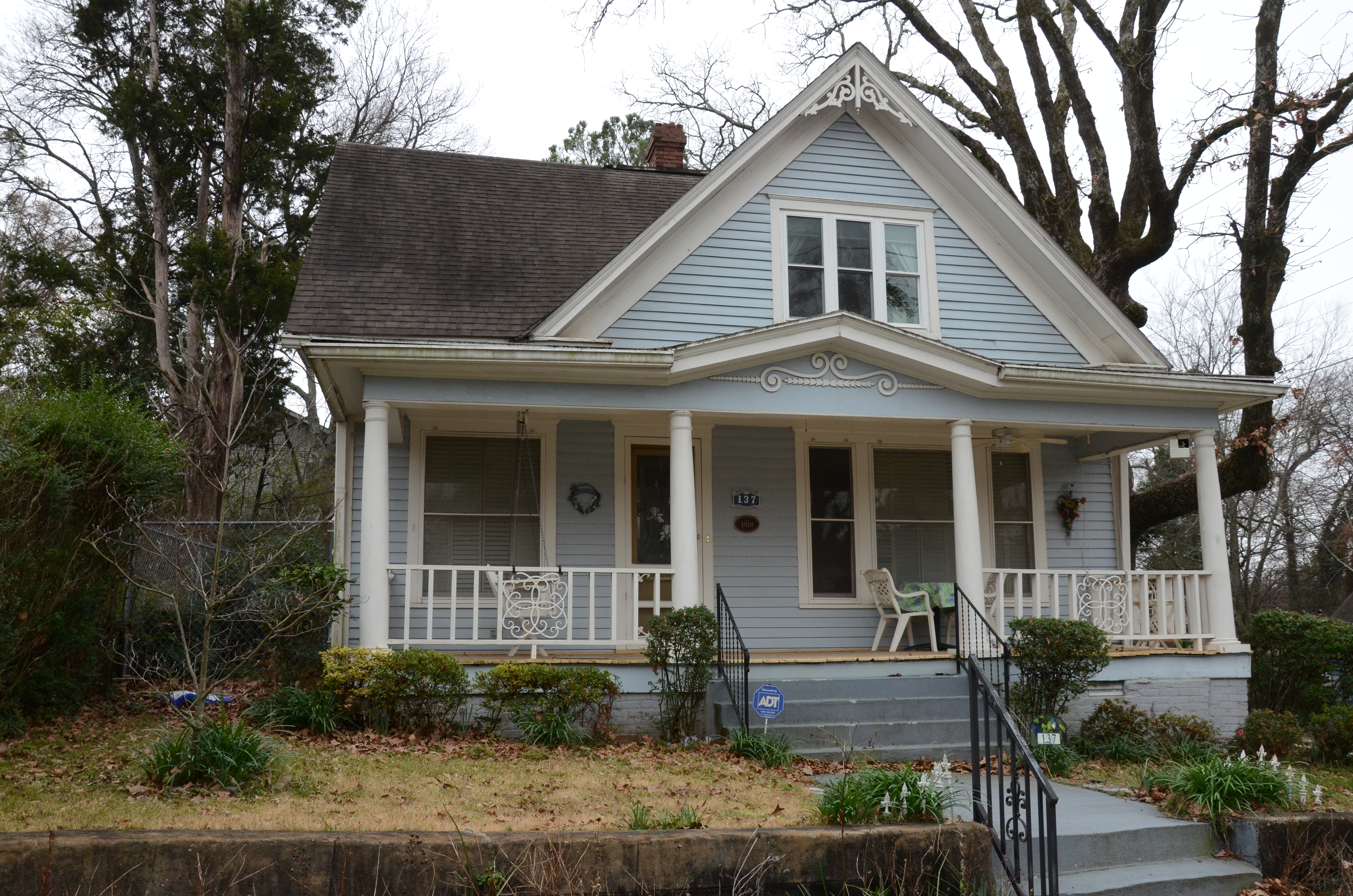

- Location within Arkansas Location within the United States
- Location: 137 Garland Ave., Hot Springs, Arkansas
- Coordinates: 34°29′58″N 93°3′28″W
- Area: less than one acre
- Built: 1910
- Architectural style: Colonial Revival
- NRHP reference No.: 00000606
- Added to NRHP: June 2, 2000

The Humphreys-Ryan House is a historic house at 137 Garland Avenue in Hot Springs, Arkansas. It is a 1 1/2-story wood-frame structure, with a cross-gable roof, clapboard siding, and a brick foundation. A single-story porch extends across the front, supported by Tuscan columns with a simple stick balustrade. Built in 1910 by Charles Humphreys, a local drugstore manager, it is a well-preserved local example of Colonial Revival architecture.

The house was listed on the National Register of Historic Places in 2000 for its well-preserved Colonial Revival architecture and its association with early 20th-century residential development in Hot Springs.

== See also ==
- National Register of Historic Places listings in Garland County, Arkansas
- Colonial Revival architecture in the United States
