= Wildwood (Hot Springs, Arkansas) =

Historic house in Arkansas, United States

- U.S. National Register of Historic Places
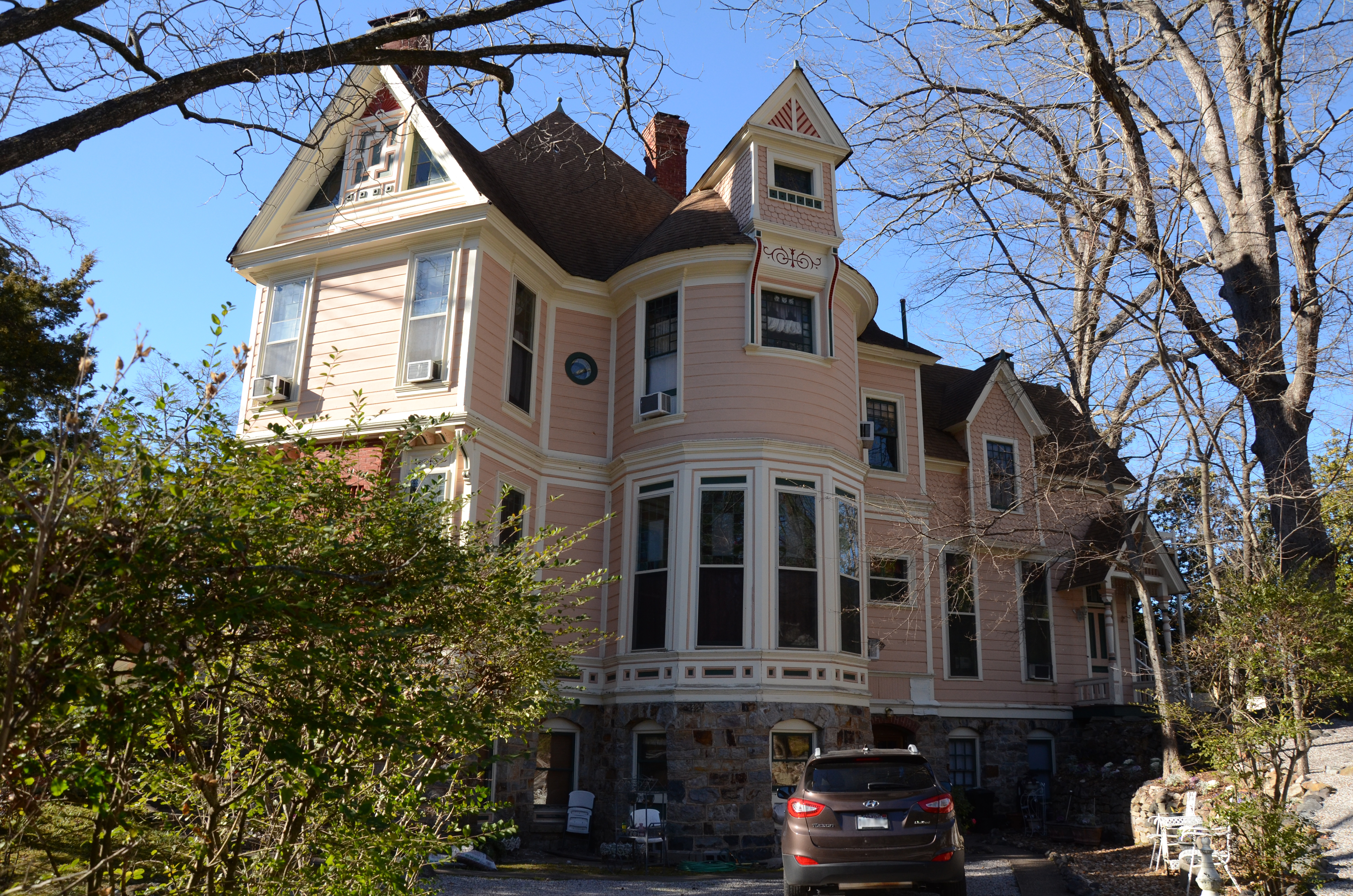

- Location within Arkansas Location within the United States
- Location: 808 Park Ave., Hot Springs, Arkansas
- Coordinates: 34°31′42″N 93°3′0″W
- Area: less than one acre
- Built: 1884
- Architect: Phillip Van Patten
- Architectural style: Stick/eastlake, Shingle Style, Eclectic Victorian
- NRHP reference No.: 76000411
- Added to NRHP: October 8, 1976

Wildwood is a historic house at 808 Park Avenue in Hot Springs, Arkansas. It is a somewhat rambling 2 1/2-story wood-frame structure, with a variety of projecting sections, gables, and porches typical of the late Victorian Queen Anne period. Notable features include a round corner turret, steeply pitched roofs, and a variety of exterior sheathing. The interior is as ornate and elaborate as the exterior, with well-preserved woodwork from different types of hardwood in each downstairs room. The house was designed by Phillip Van Patten and built in 1884 for his brother-in-law, Dr. Harvey Prosper Ellsworth. The house is now a bed and breakfast inn.

The house was listed on the National Register of Historic Places in 1976.

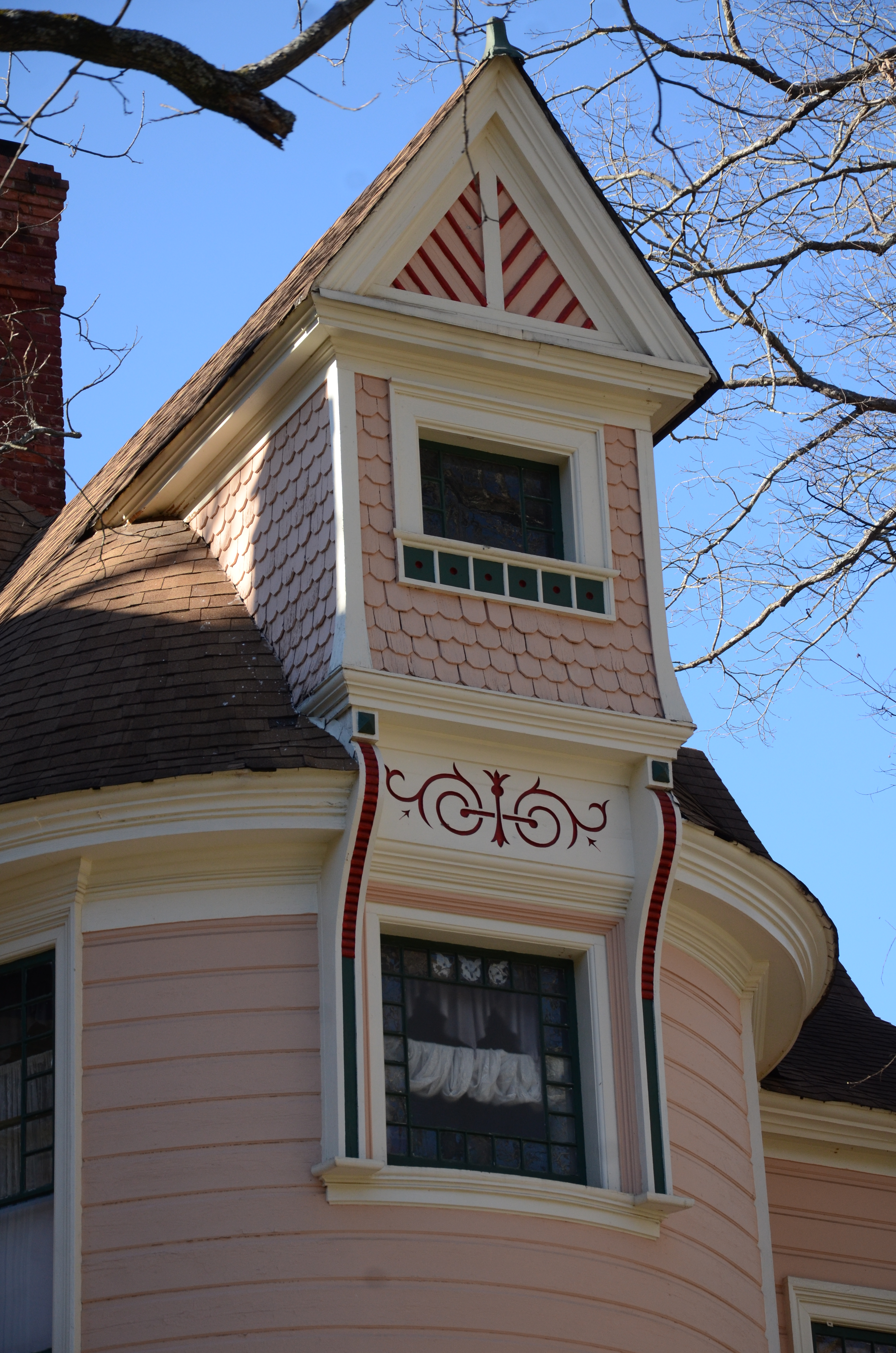
Detail of the corner turret.

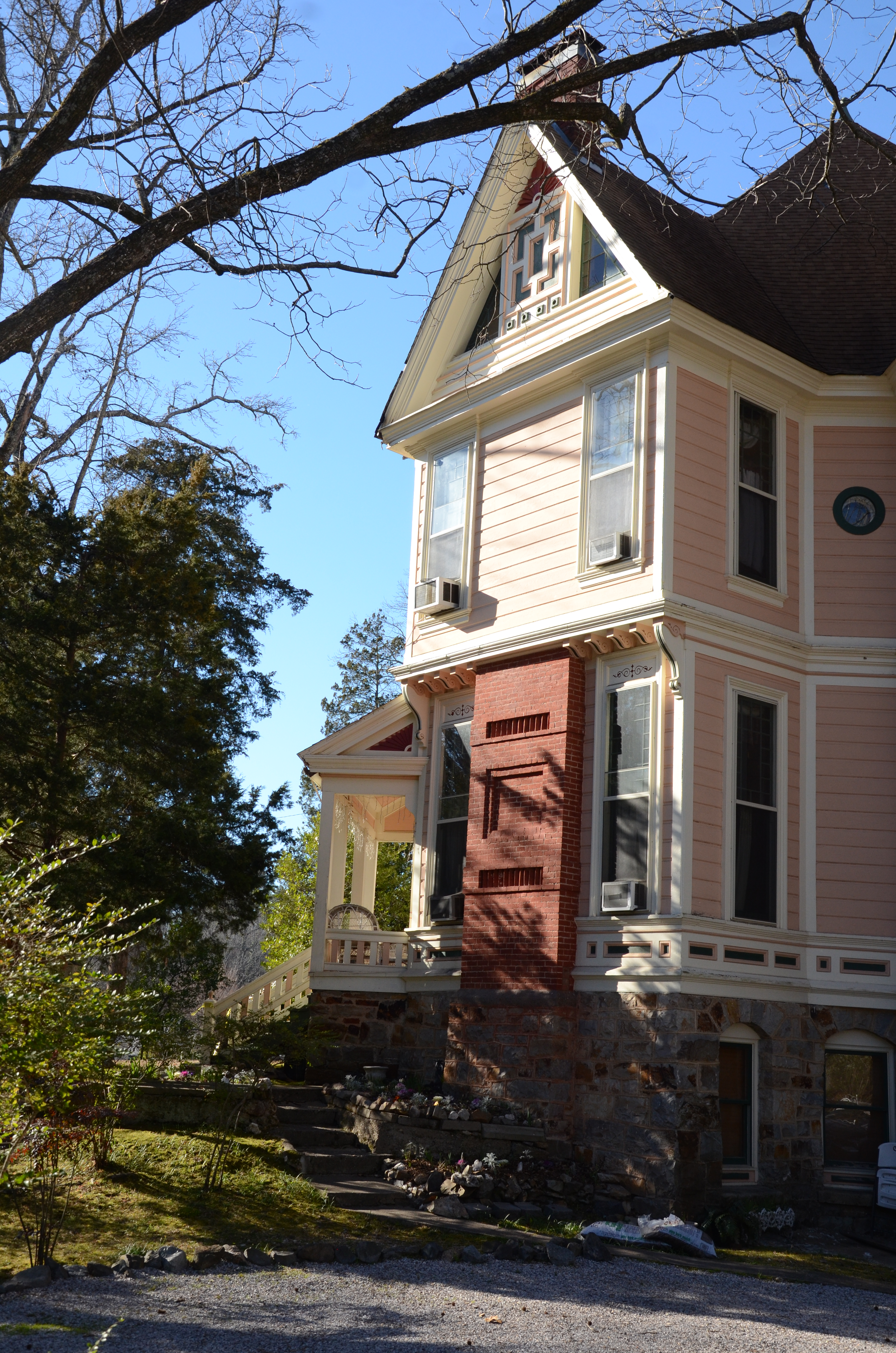
Brickwork and architectural detail.

== See also ==
- National Register of Historic Places listings in Garland County, Arkansas
