= CCC Company 3767 Powder Magazine Historic District =

Historic district in Arkansas, United States

- U.S. National Register of Historic Places
- U.S. Historic district
- Nearest city: Jessieville, Arkansas
- Area: 6 acres (2.4 ha)
- Built by: Civilian Conservation Corps
- MPS: Facilities Constructed by the CCC in Arkansas MPS
- NRHP reference No.: 07000200
- Added to NRHP: March 30, 2007

The CCC Company 3767 Powder Magazine Historic District encompasses a pair of storage structures built by the Civilian Conservation Corps (CCC) in Ouachita National Forest. It is located northwest of Jessieville, down a short abandoned roadway leading north from the junction of Gladstone Forest Road and Hampo Road. The larger building, which housed explosives used in CCC construction projects, is a roughly 9-by-7-foot (2.7 m × 2.1 m) stone building, with a separate wall wrapping around its east side. The smaller building, in which blasting caps were stored, is about 4 feet (1.2 m) square stone structure, with a concrete top and floor.

The district was listed on the National Register of Historic Places in 2007.

== See also ==
- National Register of Historic Places listings in Garland County, Arkansas
