= George Klein Tourist Court Historic District =

Historic district in Arkansas, United States

- U.S. National Register of Historic Places
- U.S. Historic district
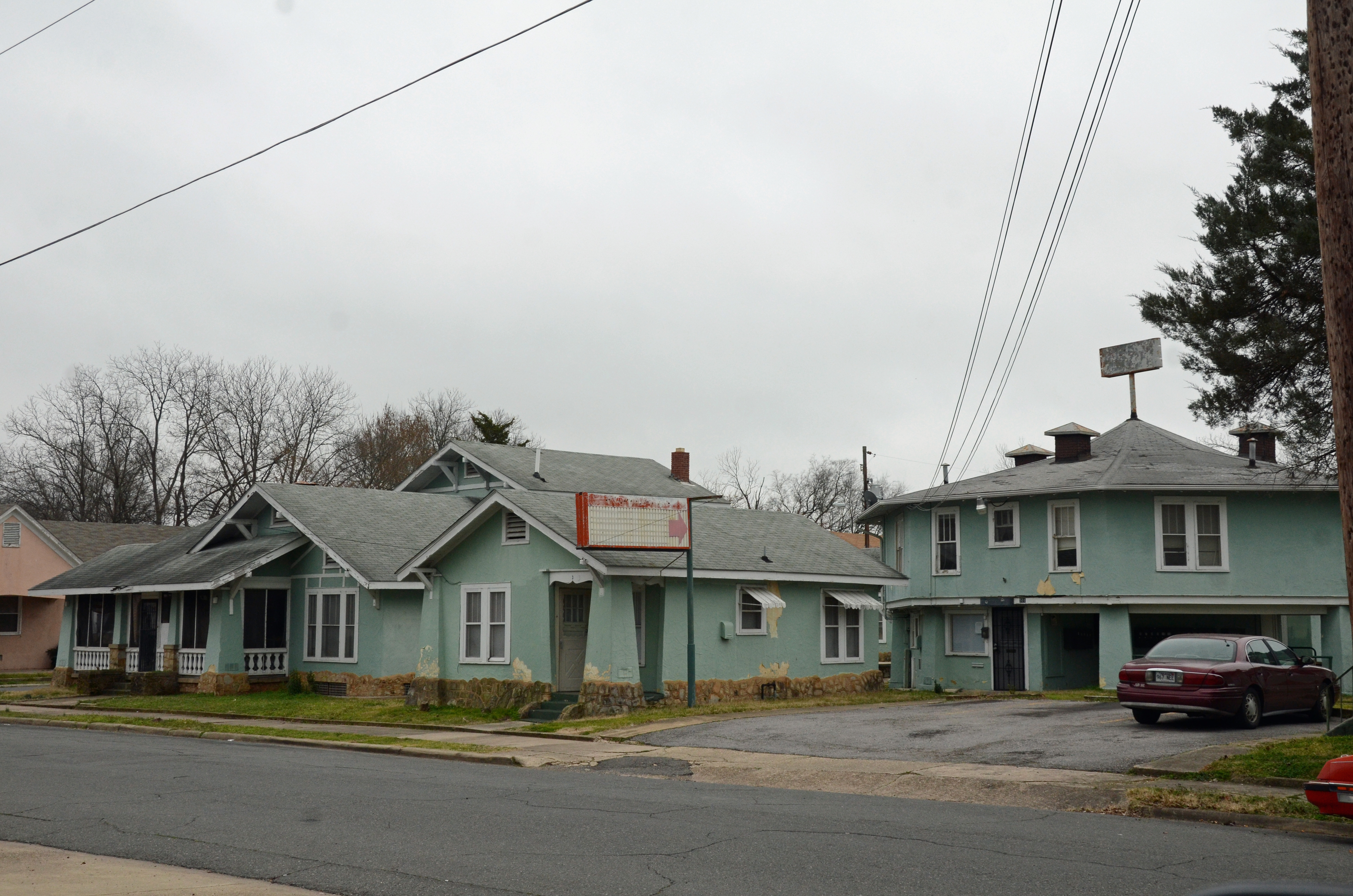

- Location within Arkansas Location within the United States
- Location: 501 Morrison St., Hot Springs, Arkansas
- Coordinates: 34°29′42″N 93°3′24″W
- Area: less than one acre
- Built: 1940
- Architectural style: Bungalow/craftsman
- NRHP reference No.: 93000480
- Added to NRHP: June 8, 1993

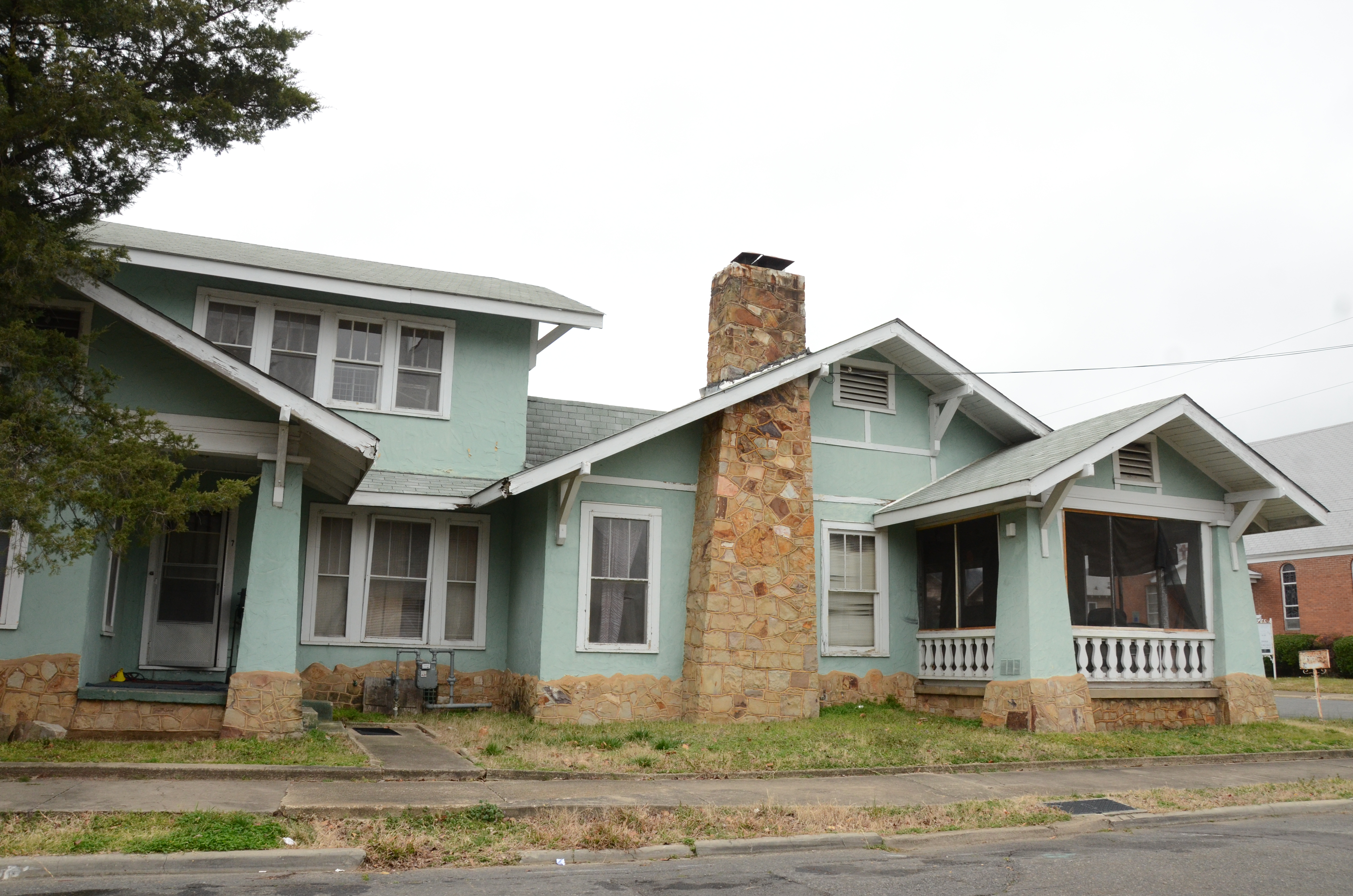
George Klein Tourist Court Historic District

The George Klein Tourist Court Historic District, also known as Green Elf Court, is a historic tourist accommodation at 501 Morrison Street in Hot Springs, Arkansas. Now an apartment complex, it consists of seven single-story cabins, an elaborate American Craftsman style manager's house, and an octagonal central residence unit with a cantilevered second floor and a bellcast roof. The complex was built about 1940, is one of the city's finest example of a Craftsman style tourist court, a popular form of traveler accommodation prior to World War II.

The property was listed on the National Register of Historic Places in 1993.

== See also ==
- National Register of Historic Places listings in Garland County, Arkansas
