= W. H. Moore House =

Historic house in Arkansas, United States

- U.S. National Register of Historic Places
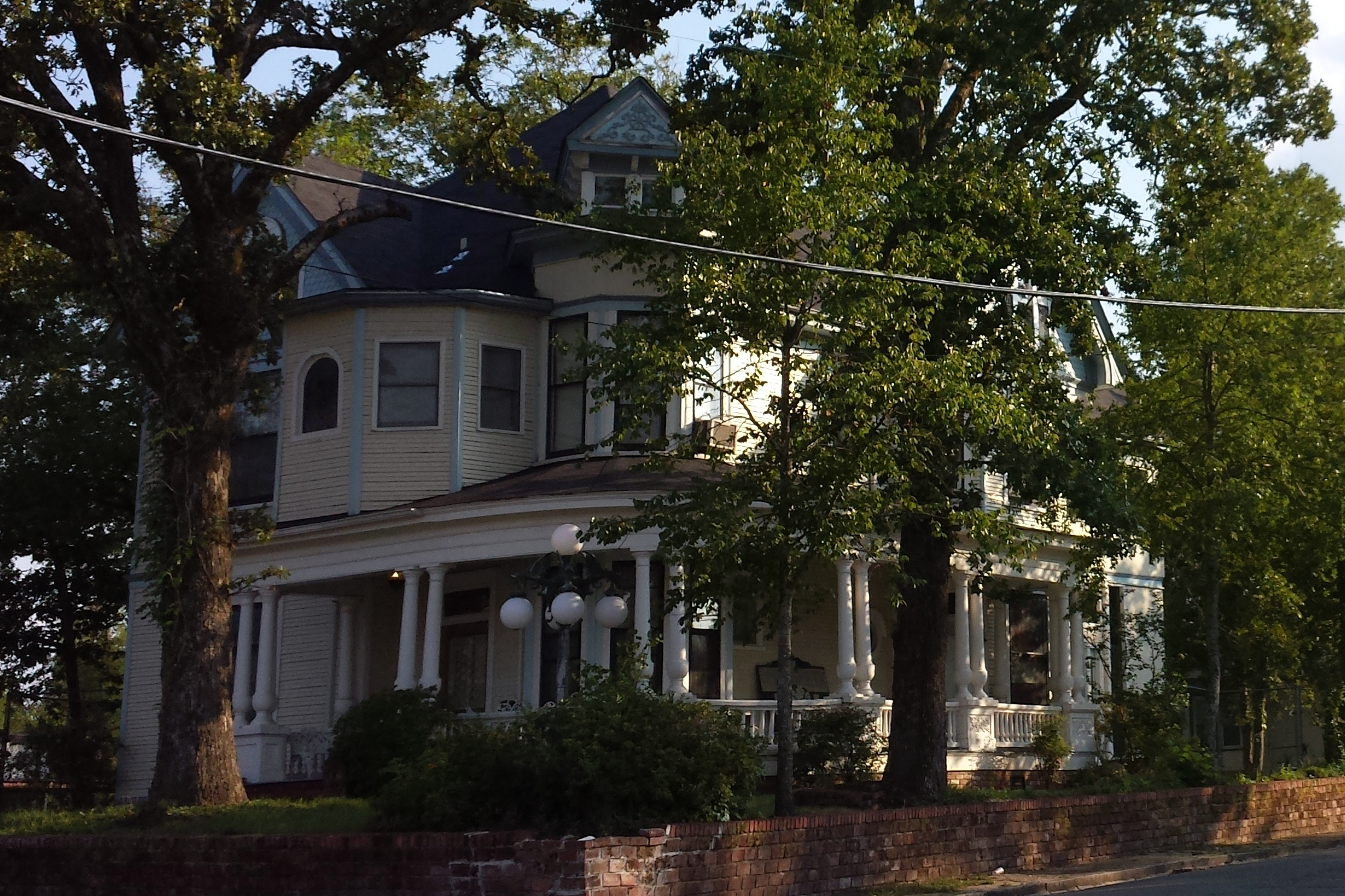

- Location within Arkansas Location within the United States
- Location: 906 Malvern St., Hot Springs, Arkansas
- Coordinates: 34°30′4″N 93°2′44″W
- Area: less than one acre
- Built: 1895
- Architectural style: Colonial Revival, Queen Anne, Transitional
- NRHP reference No.: 90000429
- Added to NRHP: March 27, 1990

The W.H. Moore House is a historic house at 906 Malvern Street in Hot Springs, Arkansas. It is a two-and-a-half story wood-frame house, with a hip roof, weatherboard siding, and a brick foundation. It has asymmetrical massing typical of the Queen Anne period, including projecting gables and window bays, a wraparound porch, and a corner turret. The porch details, however, are distinctively Colonial Revival, with heavier clustered posts supporting its roof. The house was built in the late 19th century for W.H. Moore, owner of the Valley Planing Mill, the city's only business of that type.

The house was listed on the National Register of Historic Places in 1990.

== See also ==
- National Register of Historic Places listings in Garland County, Arkansas
