= Jones School =

- U.S. National Register of Historic Places
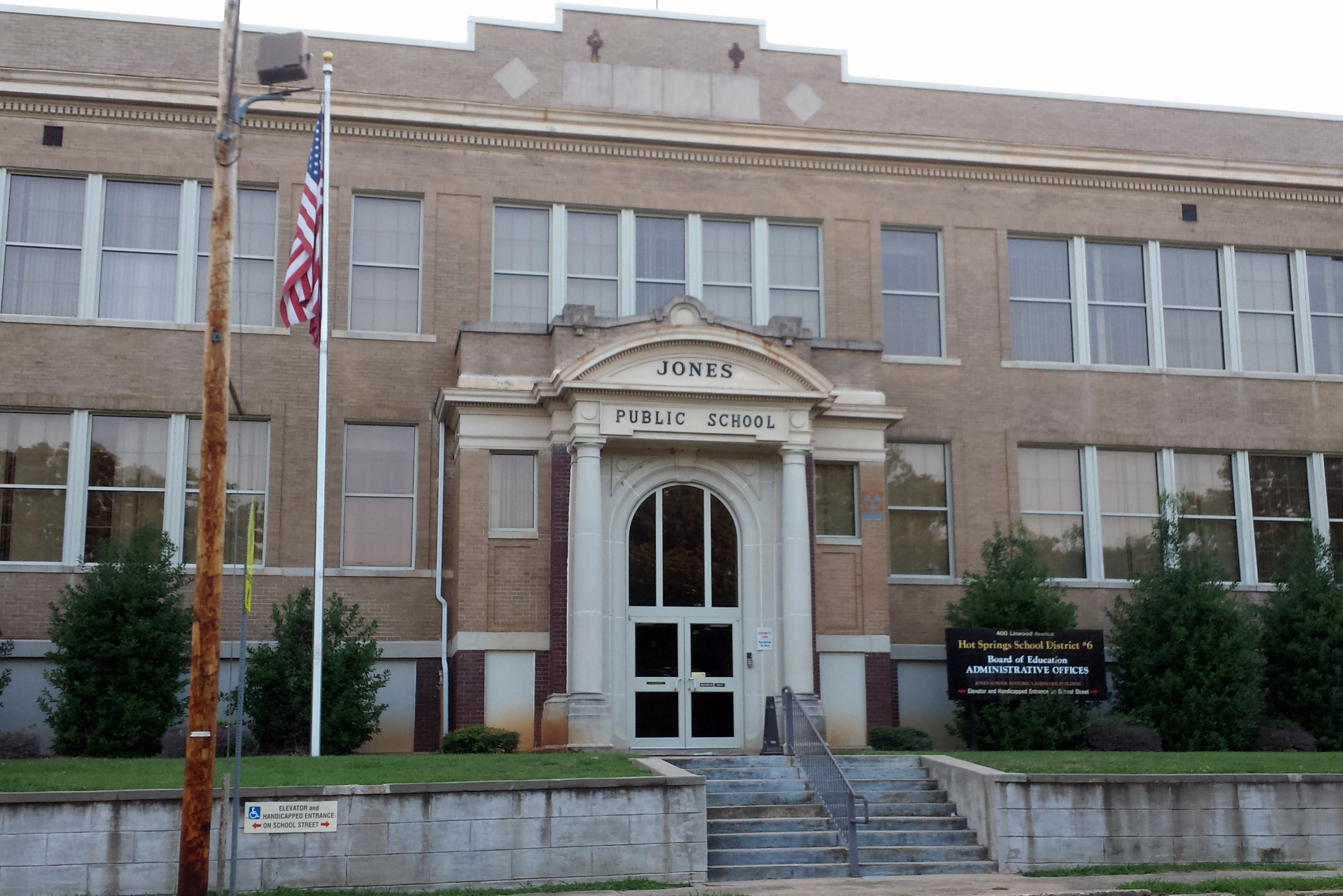

- Location within Arkansas Location within the United States
- Location: Linwood and Hobson Aves., Hot Springs, Arkansas
- Coordinates: 34°29′51″N 93°3′40″W
- Area: 1.5 acres (0.61 ha)
- Built: 1913
- Built by: Oklahoma Quarries & Construction Co.
- Architectural style: Classical Revival
- NRHP reference No.: 88000517
- Added to NRHP: May 5, 1988

The Jones School is a historic school building at Linwood and Hobson Avenues in Hot Springs, Arkansas. It is a three-story masonry structure, finished in red and beige brick, with concrete trim elements. The building is an eclectic blend of Classical Revival and American craftsman styling, with Craftsman style window groupings and a Classical entrance portico. It was built in 1913, and now houses the Hot Springs School District administrative offices.

The building was listed on the National Register of Historic Places in 1988.

== See also ==
- National Register of Historic Places listings in Garland County, Arkansas
