= Dr. Albert H. Tribble House =

Historic house in Arkansas, United States

- U.S. National Register of Historic Places
- Location within Arkansas Location within the United States
- Location: 100 Trivista Right St., Hot Springs, Arkansas
- Coordinates: 34°29′23″N 93°3′29″W
- Area: less than one acre
- Architect: Irven Donald McDaniel
- Architectural style: Classical Revival
- NRHP reference No.: 100003327
- Added to NRHP: January 24, 2019

The Dr. Albert H. Tribble House is a historic house at 100 Trivista Right Street in Hot Springs, Arkansas. It is a 3 1/2-story brick building, with a gabled roof and Classical Revival styling. Its main facade is symmetrical, with tall ground-floor windows flanking the main entrance, which has an arched transom and sidelight windows. It was built in 1938, and is possibly a design of Hot Springs architect Iven Donald McDaniel. Albert H. Tribble, for whom it was built, was prominent local physician.

The house was listed on the National Register of Historic Places in 2019.

== See also ==
- National Register of Historic Places listings in Garland County, Arkansas
