= Doherty House =

Historic house in Arkansas, United States

- U.S. National Register of Historic Places
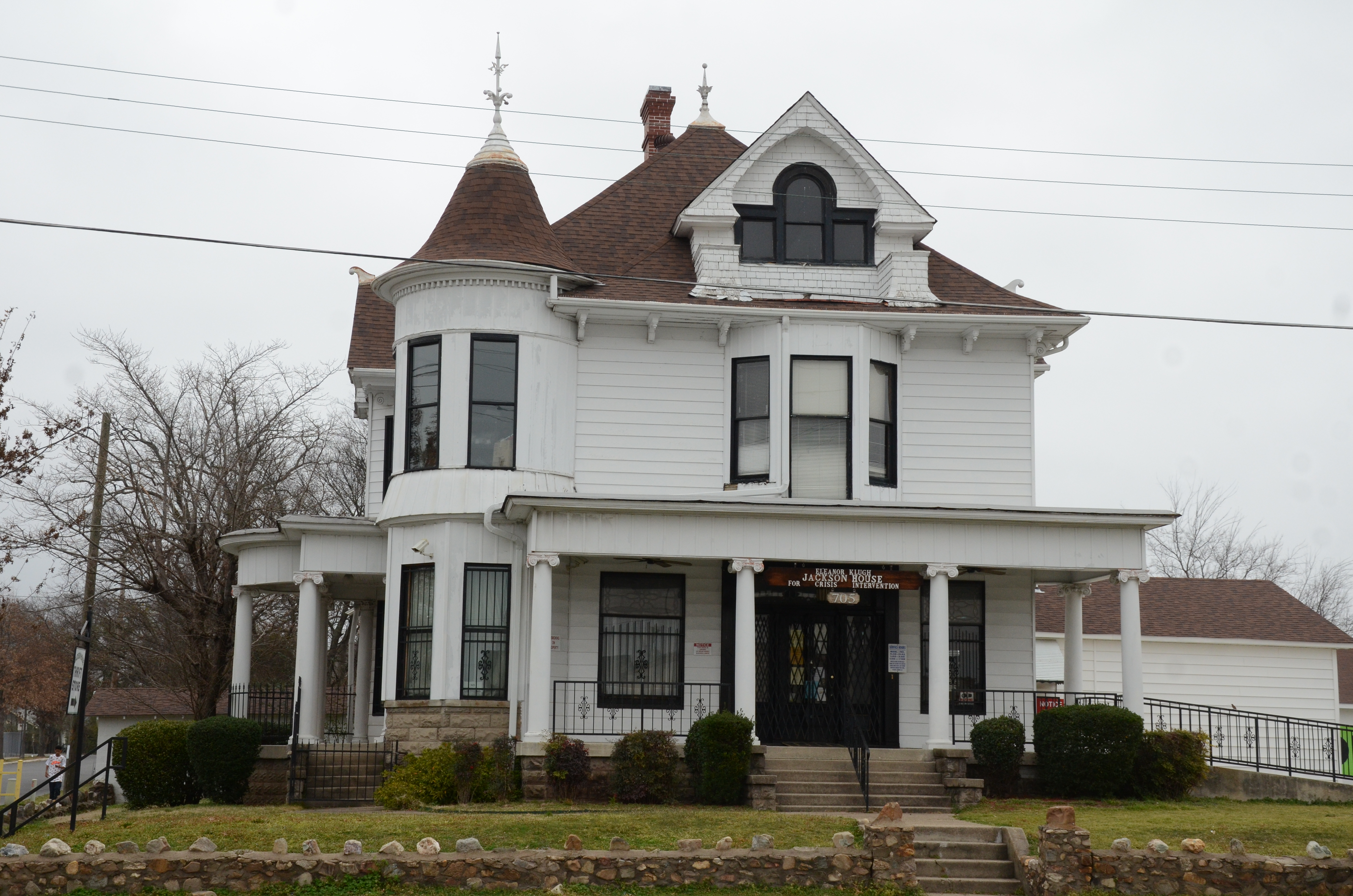

- Location within Arkansas Location within the United States
- Location: 705 Malvern Ave., Hot Springs, Arkansas
- Coordinates: 34°30′16″N 93°2′53″W
- Area: less than one acre
- Built: 1907
- Architect: Nina Doherty
- Architectural style: Late Victorian
- NRHP reference No.: 78000587
- Added to NRHP: November 14, 1978

The Martone House is a historic house at 705 Malvern Avenue in Hot Springs, Arkansas. It is a 2 1/2-story wood-frame structure, with a hip roof, clapboard siding, and a stone foundation. It has Queen Anne Victorian styling, with a gabled projecting window bay, rounded turret projecting at one corner, and a wraparound porch. It was built in 1907 for Thomas and Nina (Cascoldt) Doherty, and is notable as one of Hot Springs' first motel properties, as it was where the Dohertys not only let rooms in the house, but also built cabins to the rear of the property to house more visitors.

The house was listed on the National Register of Historic Places in 1978.

== See also ==
- National Register of Historic Places listings in Garland County, Arkansas
