= Kraemer-Harman House =

Historic house in Arkansas, United States

- U.S. National Register of Historic Places
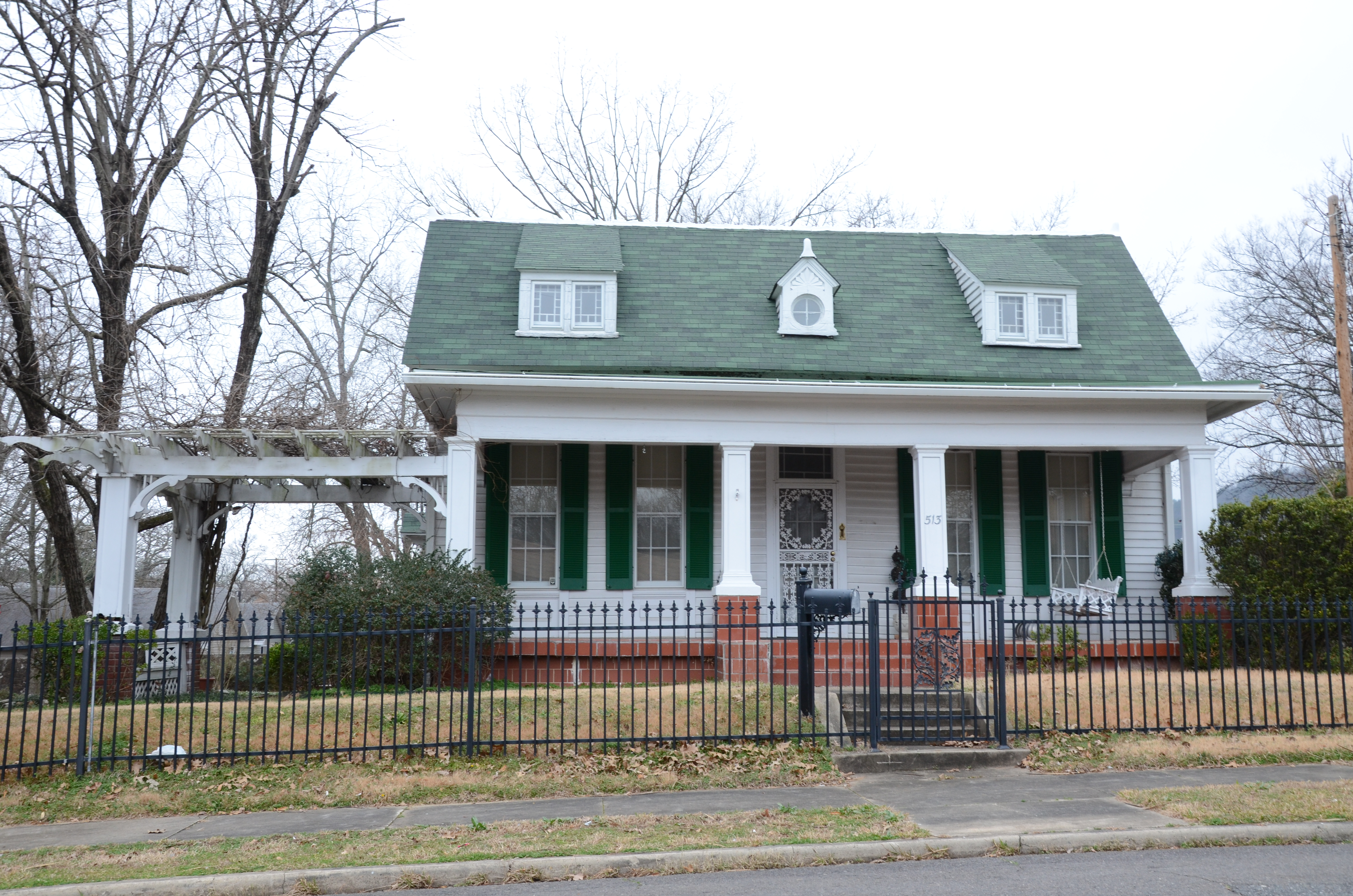

- Location within Arkansas Location within the United States
- Nearest city: Hot Springs, Arkansas
- Coordinates: 34°29′50″N 93°3′46″W
- Area: 1 acre (0.40 ha)
- Built: 1884
- Architect: Springer, Mr.
- NRHP reference No.: 99001258
- Added to NRHP: October 21, 1999

The Kraemer-Harman House is a historic house at 513 2nd Street in Hot Springs, Arkansas. It is a 1 1/2-story wood-frame structure, originally built in 1884 with vernacular styling, and embellished in the 20th century with Craftsman and Classical Revival elements. It has a hip-roof porch extending across its front, supported by square columns mounted on short brick piers. The interior features particularly elaborate Craftsman style, with carved plaster ceilings, and a buffet with ornate woodwork and leaded glass doors.

The house was listed on the National Register of Historic Places in 1999.

== See also ==
- National Register of Historic Places listings in Garland County, Arkansas
