= Cove Tourist Court =

- U.S. National Register of Historic Places
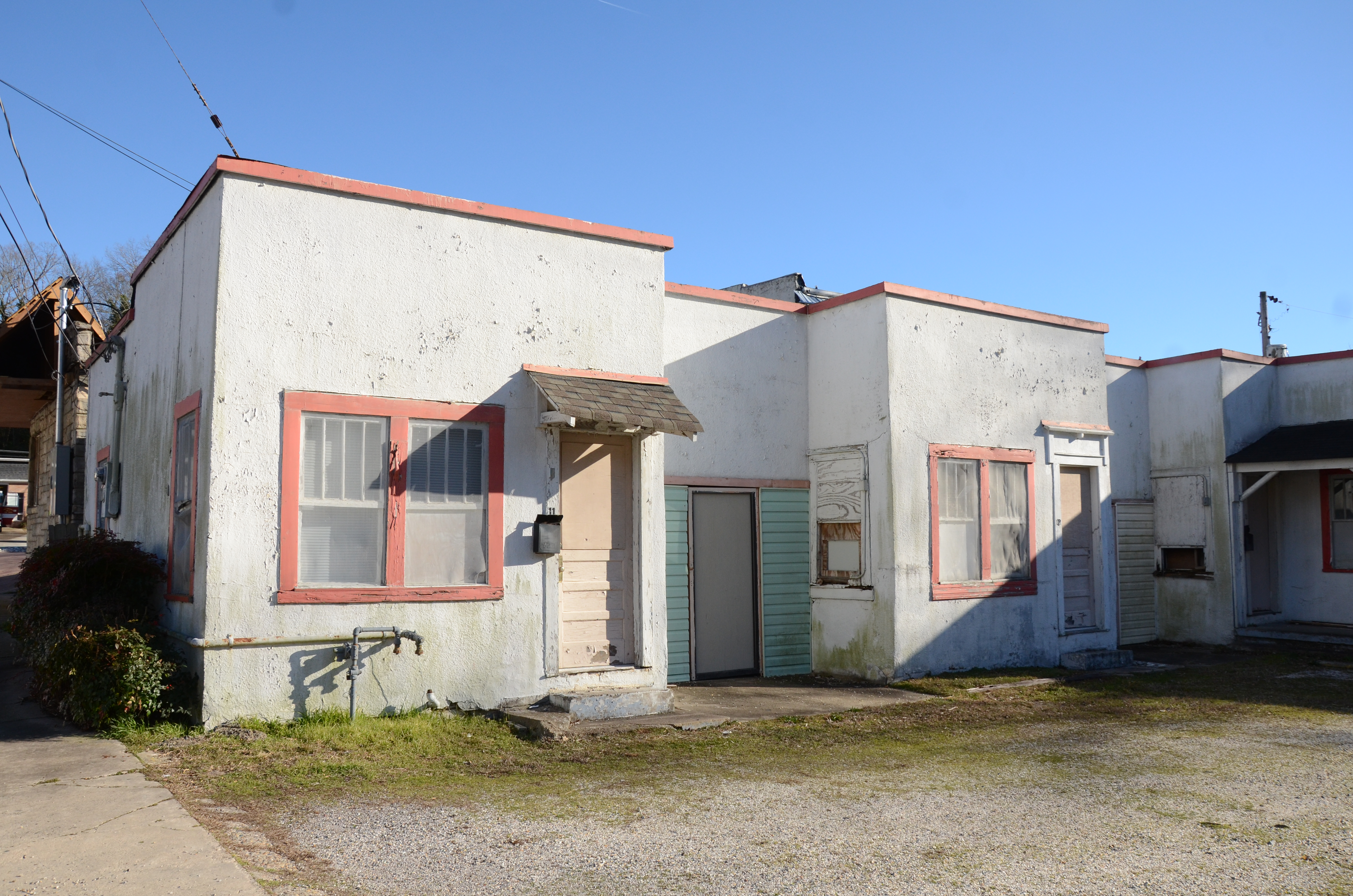

- Location within Arkansas Location within the United States
- Location: 771 Park Ave., Hot Springs, Arkansas
- Coordinates: 34°31′38″N 93°3′5″W
- Area: less than one acre
- Built: 1937
- Architectural style: International Style
- MPS: Arkansas Highway History and Architecture MPS
- NRHP reference No.: 04000008
- Added to NRHP: February 11, 2004

Cove Tourist Court is a historic former tourist accommodation at 771 Park Avenue in Hot Springs, Arkansas. It is a U-shaped facility, a single story in height, built with wood framing and a stucco exterior in the International Style of architecture. Each of the nine units has an entrance sheltered by a shed roof with Craftsman brackets, and a single-car garage with a two-leaf hinged door. Built about 1937, it is a well-preserved example of the tourist court form in International Style. It has since been converted into residential apartments.

The property was listed on the National Register of Historic Places in 2004.

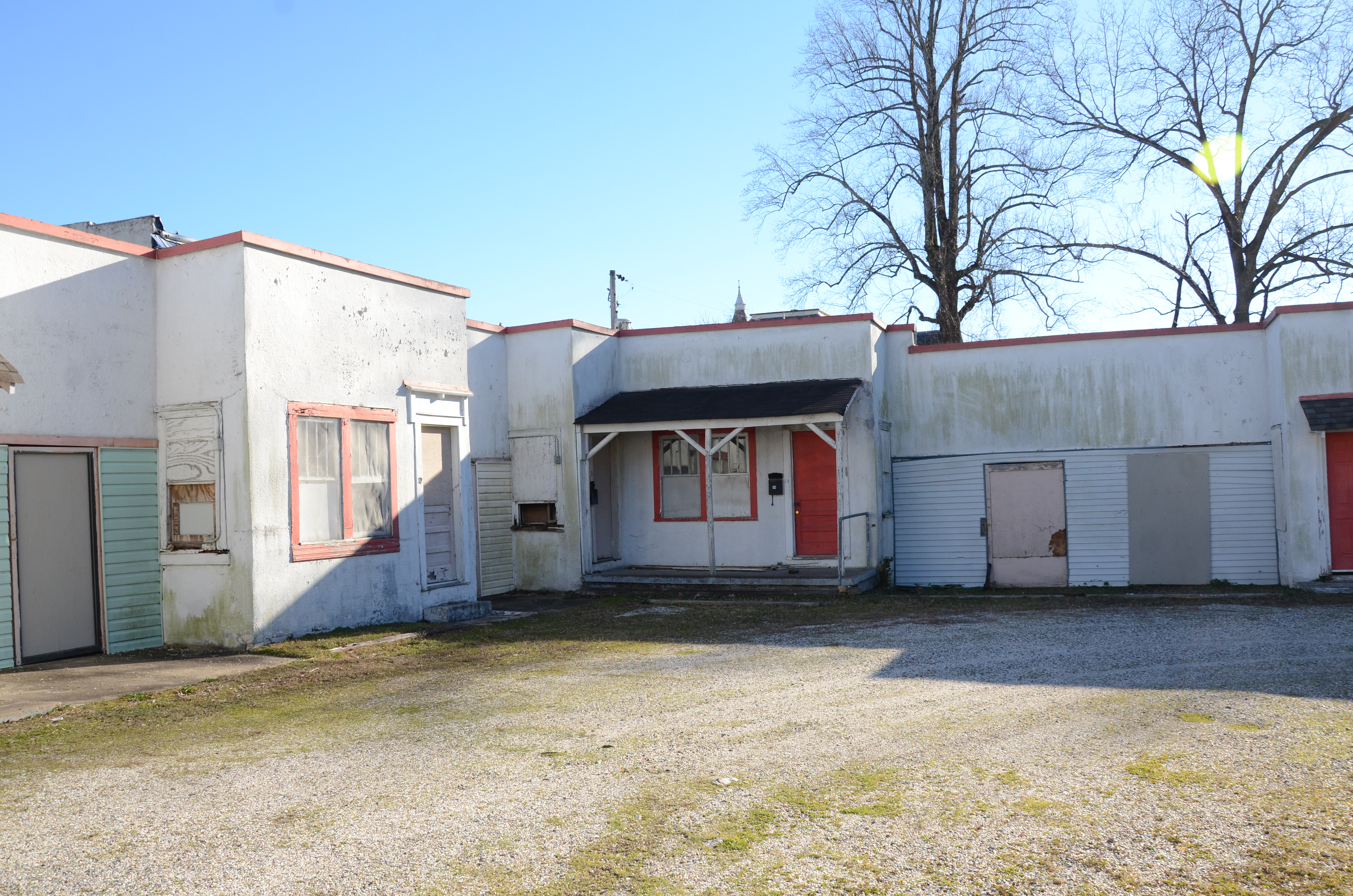

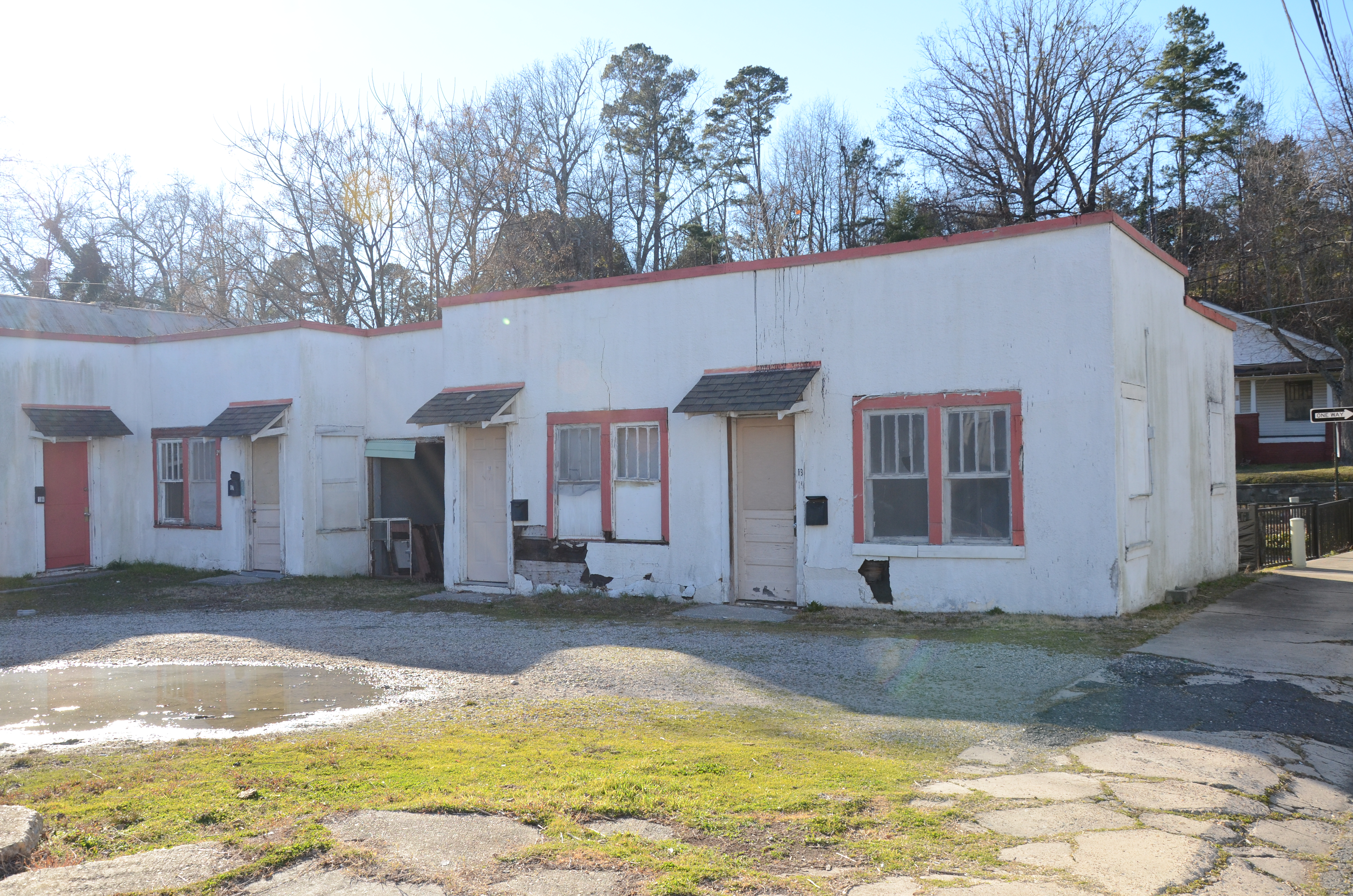

== See also ==
- National Register of Historic Places listings in Garland County, Arkansas
