= Low key (disambiguation) =

Low key is a term used in describing paintings or photographs that mainly consist of dark tones.

Low key may also refer to:

== Science and technology ==
- Low-key lighting, a style of lighting for photography, film or television

== People ==
- Lowkey (born Kareem Dennis in 1986), an Iraqi-English rapper

== Music ==
- Lo-Key?, a 1990s American hip hop/R&B band
- Low Key (album), an album by Regine Velasquez-Alcasid, 2008
- "Low Key", a song by Banky W. from the album R&BW, 2011
- Low Key, album by Brendan Benson of The Raconteurs, 2022
- "Low Key", a song by Russell Dickerson from the album Yours, 2017
- "Low Key" (Ally Brooke song), 2019
- "Low Key", a song by Ciara from the EP CiCi, 2023

== Other ==
- Low Key Arts, art space and music venue in Hot Springs, Arkansas, United States

== See also ==
- Low Ki, American professional wrestler
- Loki (disambiguation)
