= Riviera Hotel =

Riviera Hotel or Hotel Riviera may refer to:

in Ukraine

- Hotel Riviera, Kyiv, Ukraine

in Cuba

- Hotel Habana Riviera, Havana, Cuba

in England

- Riviera Hotel, Bowleaze Cove, Dorset

in Spain

- Hotel Riviera (Ibiza)

in Lebanon

- Riviera Hotel Beirut

in the United States

- Riviera Hotel (Hot Springs, Arkansas), listed on the NRHP in Garland County, Arkansas
- Riviera (hotel and casino), on the Las Vegas Strip
- Riviera (Palm Springs hotel), in California
- Disney's Riviera Resort, in Bay Lake, Florida
