= Parkway Courts Historic District =

Historic district in Arkansas, United States

- U.S. National Register of Historic Places
- U.S. Historic district
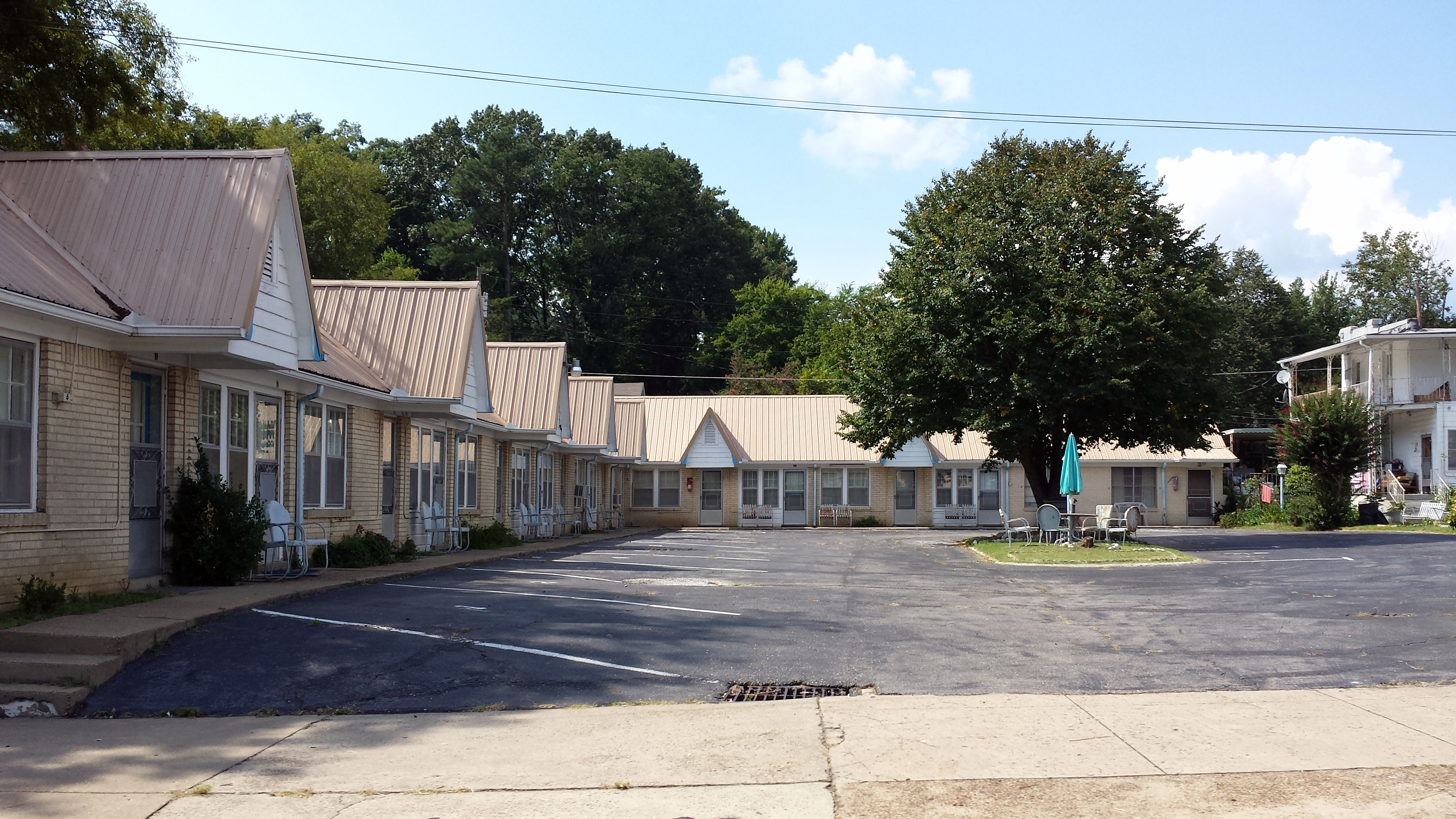

- Location within Arkansas Location within the United States
- Location: 815 Park Ave., Hot Springs, Arkansas
- Coordinates: 34°31′35″N 93°3′7″W
- Area: less than one acre
- Built: 1943
- Architectural style: Tudor Revival, Bungalow/craftsman
- MPS: Arkansas Highway History and Architecture MPS
- NRHP reference No.: 04000009
- Added to NRHP: February 11, 2004

The Parkway Courts Historic District encompasses a historic tourist accommodation at 815 Park Avenue in Hot Springs, Arkansas. It is a U-shaped tourist court, with 48 units and a building housing an office and manager's residence. The units come in three styles, some with larger sleeping and living spaces, and some with kitchenettes. Each unit is highlighted architecturally by a steeply pitched gable over the entrance. The buildings are brick. The units were built in 1943, and the manager's residence/office in 1950, after the original burned down. It is one of the city's oldest surviving tourist courts.

The property was listed on the National Register of Historic Places in 2004.

== See also ==
- National Register of Historic Places listings in Garland County, Arkansas
