= Forest Service Headquarters Historic District =

United States historic place

- U.S. National Register of Historic Places
- U.S. Historic district
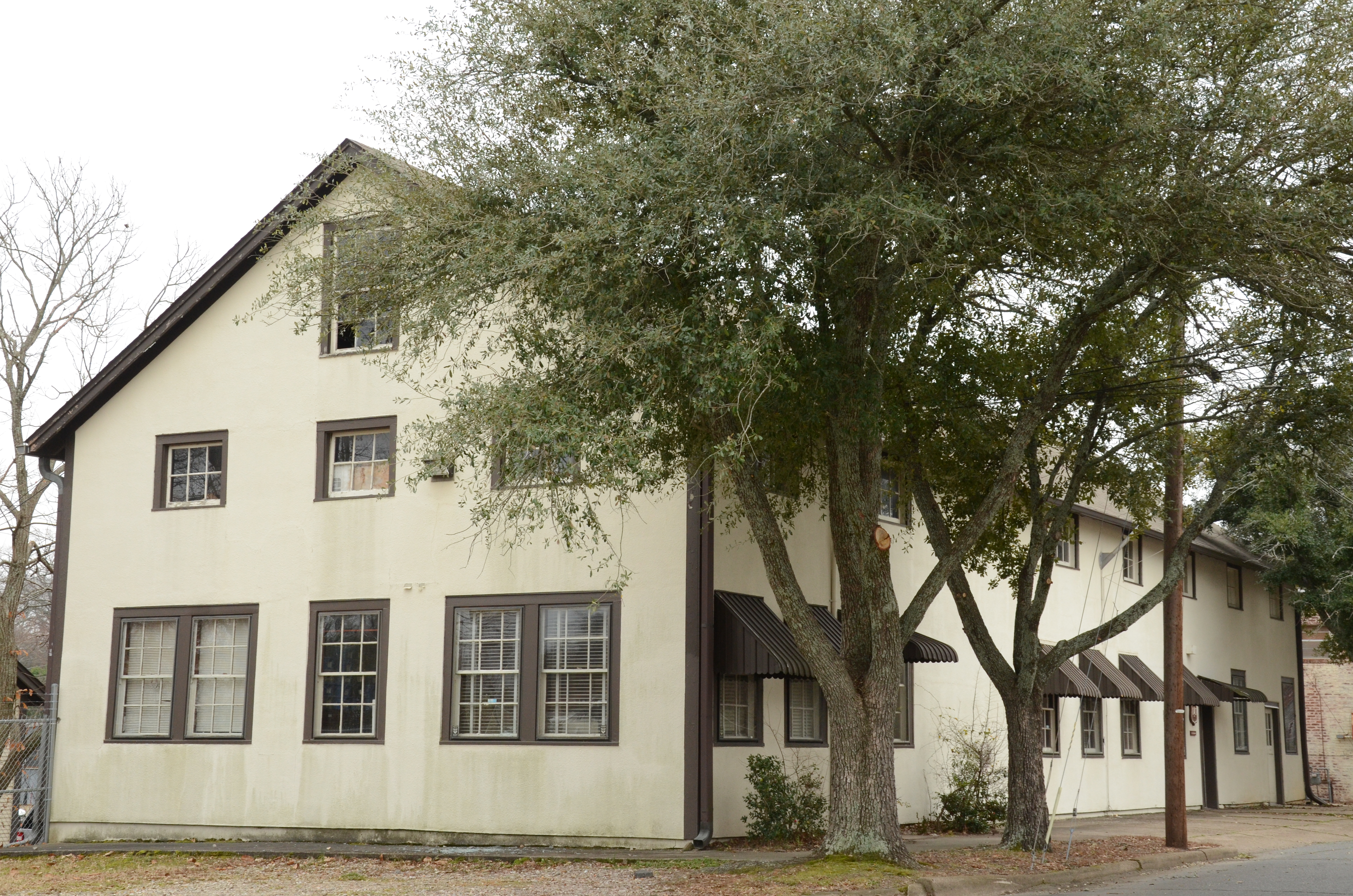

- Location within Arkansas Location within the United States
- Location: S of jct. of Winona and Indiana Sts., Hot Springs, Arkansas
- Coordinates: 34°29′32″N 93°3′16″W
- Area: 4 acres (1.6 ha)
- Built: 1933
- Built by: Civilian Conservation Corps
- Architectural style: Bungalow/American craftsman
- MPS: Facilities Constructed by the CCC in Arkansas MPS
- NRHP reference No.: 93001089
- Added to NRHP: October 20, 1993

The Forest Service Headquarters Historic District is a historic district in Hot Springs, Arkansas, encompassing a collection of six historic government buildings on the south side of the junction of Winona and Indiana Streets. These six vernacular stuccoed wood-frame structures were built by crews of the Civilian Conservation Corps (CCC) between 1933 and 1939 to serve as the headquarters of the Jessieville district of the Ouachita National Forest. The buildings later served as the headquarters for the entire Ouachita National Forest. The approximately 4 acres (1.6 ha) district was listed on the National Register of Historic Places on October 20, 1993, as part of the Facilities Constructed by the CCC in Arkansas Multiple Property Submission.

== History ==
=== Ouachita National Forest ===
The Ouachita National Forest was established as the Arkansas National Forest on December 18, 1907, by an executive order from President Theodore Roosevelt, making it the oldest national forest in the southern United States. The forest was renamed the Ouachita National Forest by President Calvin Coolidge on April 29, 1926. The forest's supervisor's office was originally located in Mena, Arkansas, before eventually relocating to Hot Springs. By the early 1930s, the forest's vast timber resources were under threat from drought and lack of fire protection; Arkansas's timberland had shrunk from approximately 32 million acres in the nineteenth century to 22 million acres by 1930.

=== Civilian Conservation Corps ===
The CCC was one of President Franklin D. Roosevelt's New Deal programs, established through the Emergency Conservation Work Act passed by Congress on March 31, 1933. The program put unemployed young men to work on conservation projects across the country, including forest management, road construction, and the development of recreational facilities. In Arkansas, the CCC operated within the Seventh Corps Area, headquartered in Omaha, Nebraska, with the state's district headquarters at East 25th Street and the Rock Island Railroad in Little Rock. At its peak in 1935, there were 65 CCC camps throughout Arkansas.

In 1933, CCC crews constructed the six buildings of the Forest Service Headquarters complex to serve as the administrative center for the Jessieville ranger district of the Ouachita National Forest. The buildings are designed in a bungalow/American Craftsman style, characteristic of the vernacular architecture employed by the CCC in administrative and utilitarian structures. The CCC's contributions to the Ouachita National Forest extended well beyond this headquarters complex and included the construction of recreational facilities at Iron Springs and Camp Clearfork, fire towers, roads, bridges, and other forest infrastructure.

== Description ==
The district consists of six stuccoed wood-frame buildings arranged on an approximately 4 acres (1.6 ha) site on the south side of the junction of Winona and Indiana Streets in Hot Springs. The buildings were constructed between 1933 and 1939 and are designated Buildings 1 through 6. They are vernacular in design with stuccoed exterior walls and reflect the practical, functional approach typical of CCC-built administrative structures, incorporating elements of the Bungalow/American Craftsman style.

== See also ==
- Civilian Conservation Corps
- National Register of Historic Places listings in Garland County, Arkansas
- Ouachita National Forest
