= Wade Building =

- U.S. National Register of Historic Places
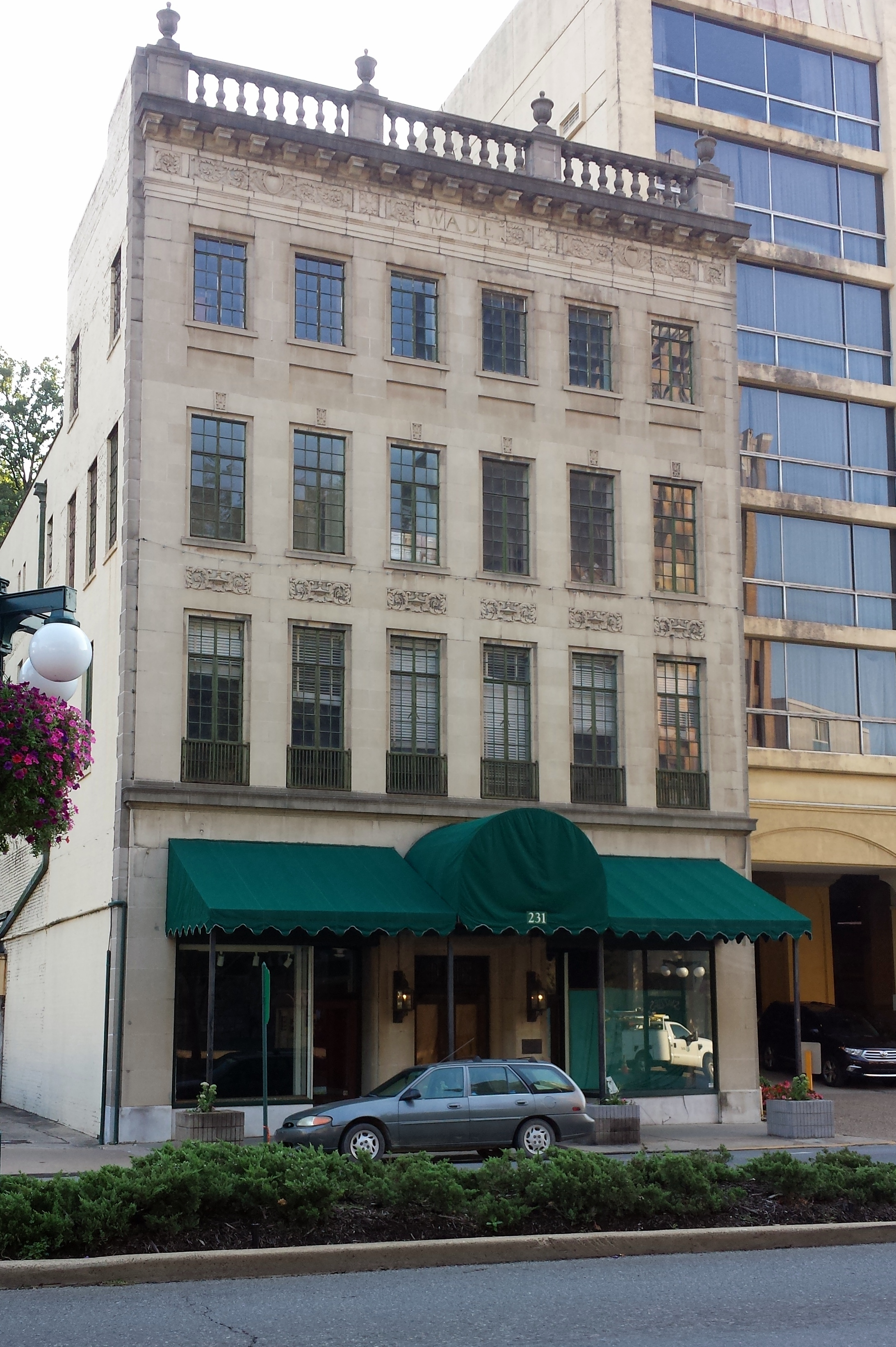

- Location within Arkansas Location within the United States
- Location: 231 Central, Hot Springs, Arkansas
- Coordinates: 34°31′1″N 93°3′13″W
- Area: less than one acre
- Built: 1927
- Architect: Thompson, Sanders & Ginocchio
- Architectural style: Classical Revival
- MPS: Thompson, Charles L., Design Collection TR
- NRHP reference No.: 82000822
- Added to NRHP: December 22, 1982

The Wade Building is a historic commercial building located at 231 Central Avenue in Hot Springs, Arkansas.

== Description and history ==
It is a four-story masonry structure, built out of brick, with a dressed stone facade. The ground floor has a commercial storefront, with a recessed entrance and plate glass windows sheltered by an awning. The upper floors' bays have windows that decrease in size and level of decoration, with a modillioned cornice and balustraded parapet at the top. The building was designed by the firm of Thompson, Sanders & Ginocchio, and is a well-proportioned example of Classical Revival architecture.

The building was listed on the National Register of Historic Places on December 22, 1982.

== See also ==
- National Register of Historic Places listings in Garland County, Arkansas
