= Hot Springs Mountain Tower =

Coordinates: 34°31′02.02″N 93°02′45.98″W

Hot Springs Mountain Tower is a 216-foot (65.8 m) high observation tower built of lattice steel on Hot Springs Mountain at Hot Springs, Arkansas, USA. Construction began in 1982, and the structure was officially opened to the public on June 3, 1983.

The tower is the third to be built on the mountain. In the nineteenth century, a 75-foot wooden observatory was constructed on the site. This tower was later struck by lightning and burned to the ground. In 1906, the wireless telegraph tower from the 1904 Louisiana Purchase Exposition was relocated to the mountain and renamed the Rix Tower; it stood for there 69 years, finally being torn down in 1975 due to instability.

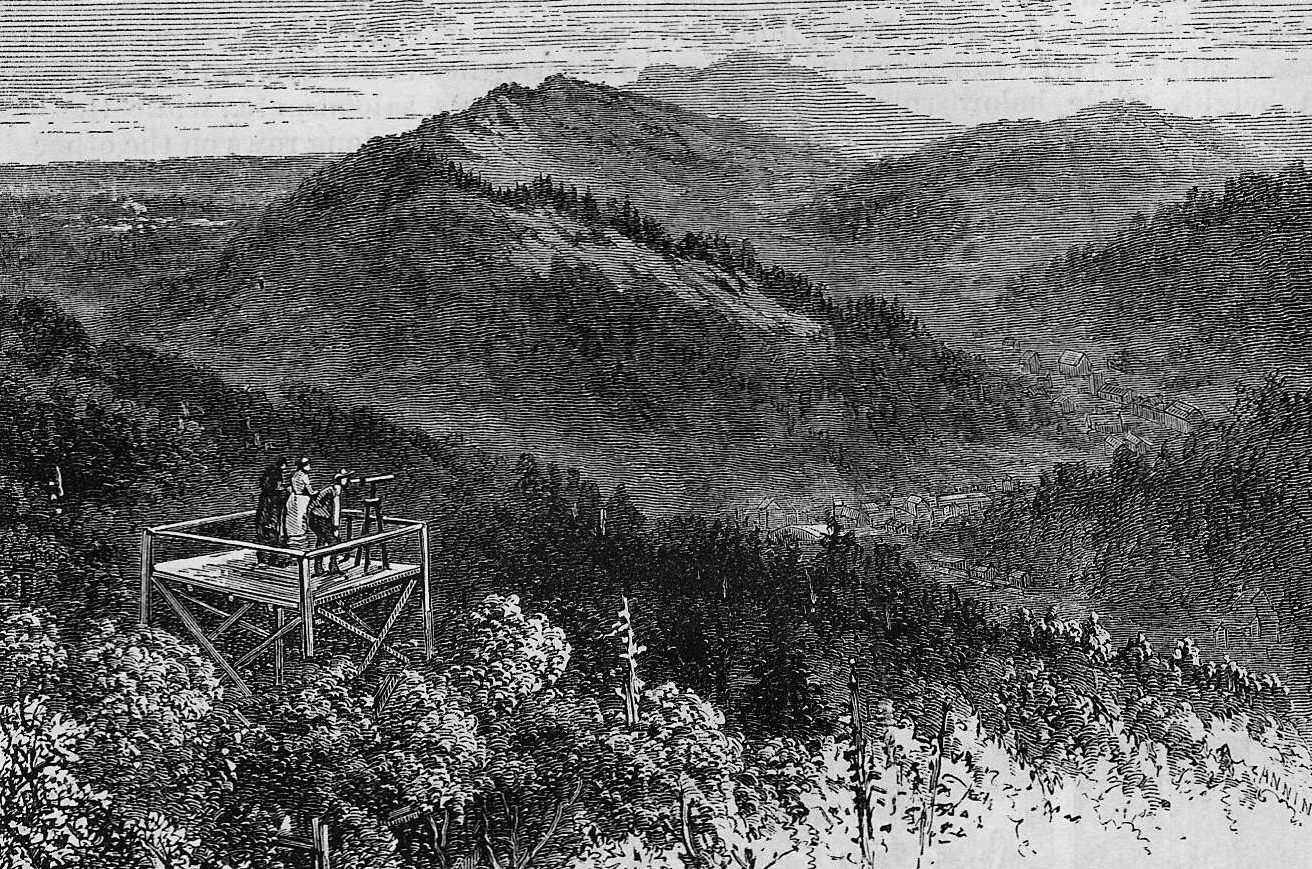
Observatory on Hot Springs Mountain (Harper's, 1878)

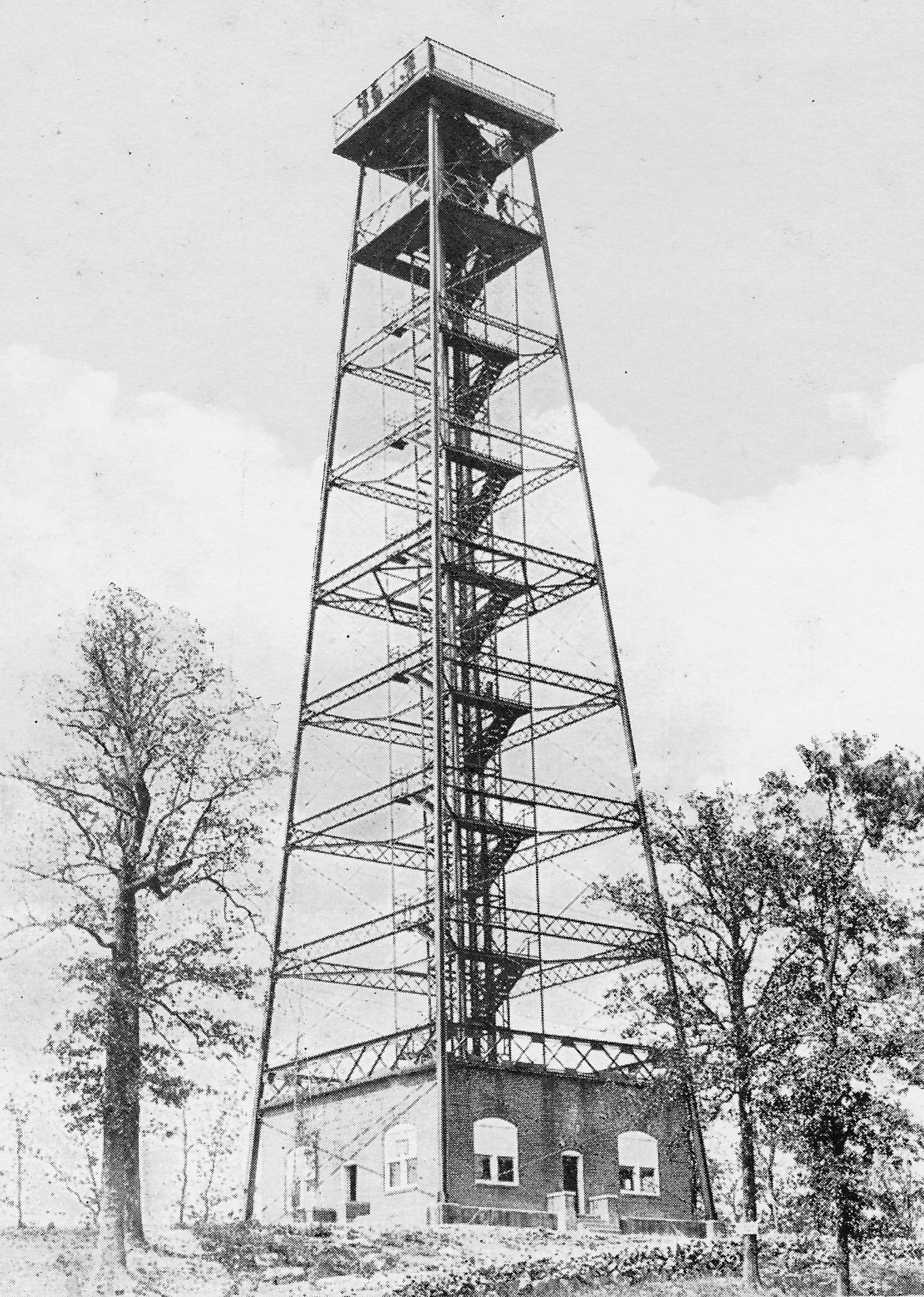
Observation tower circa 1924. 165 feet high. 120 mile view and has elevator service.

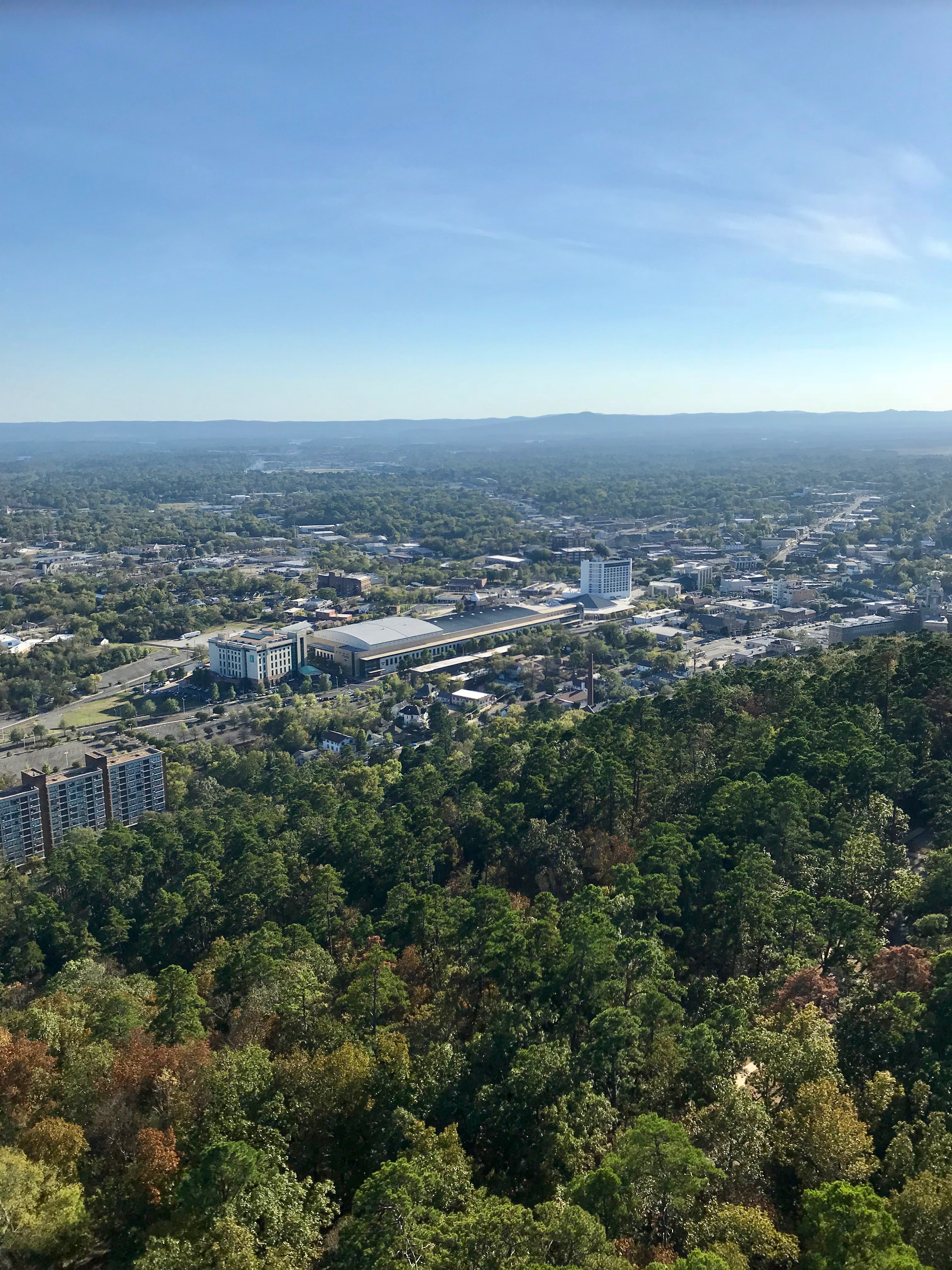
View of Hot Springs from the tower

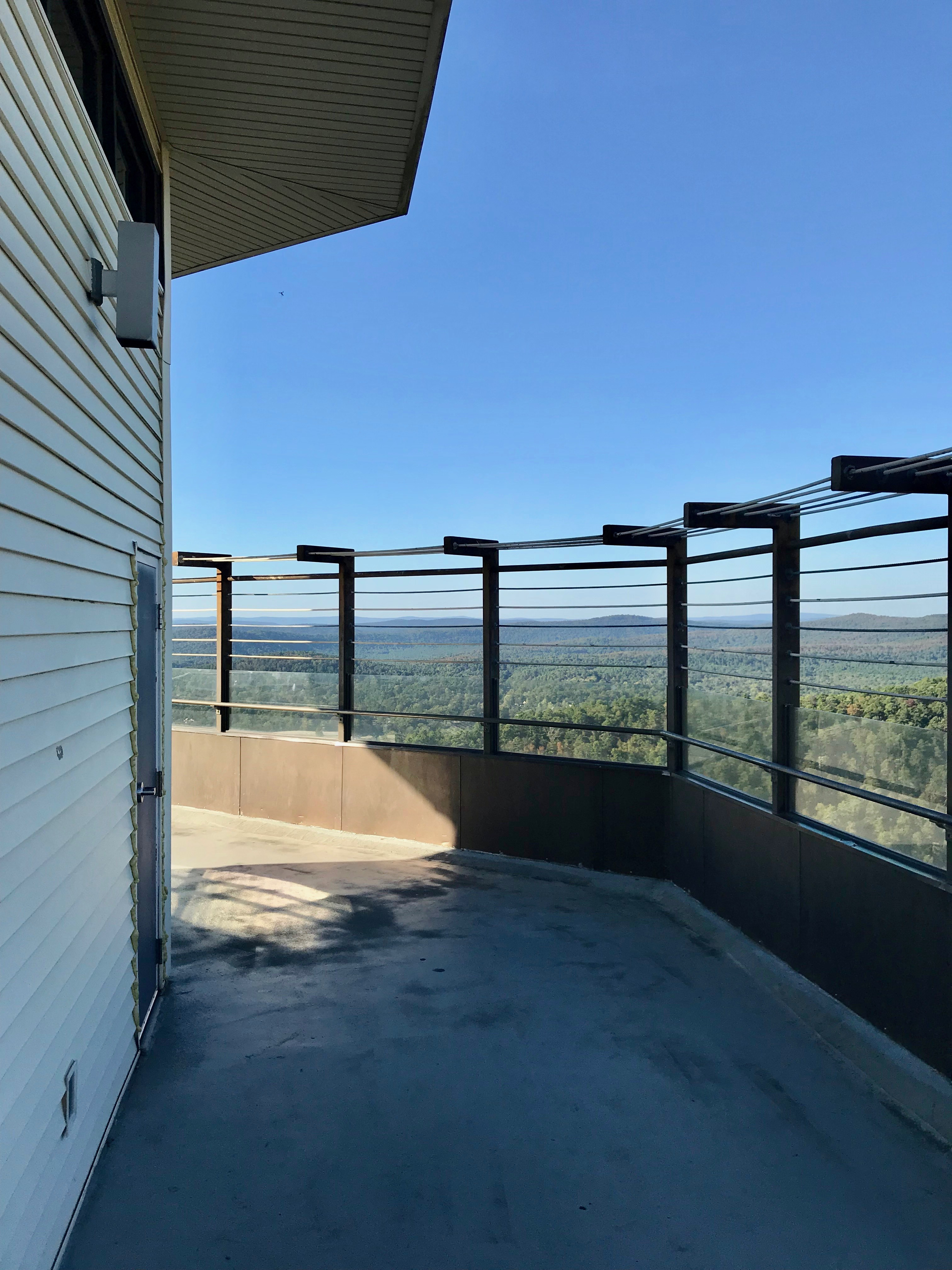
Observation deck

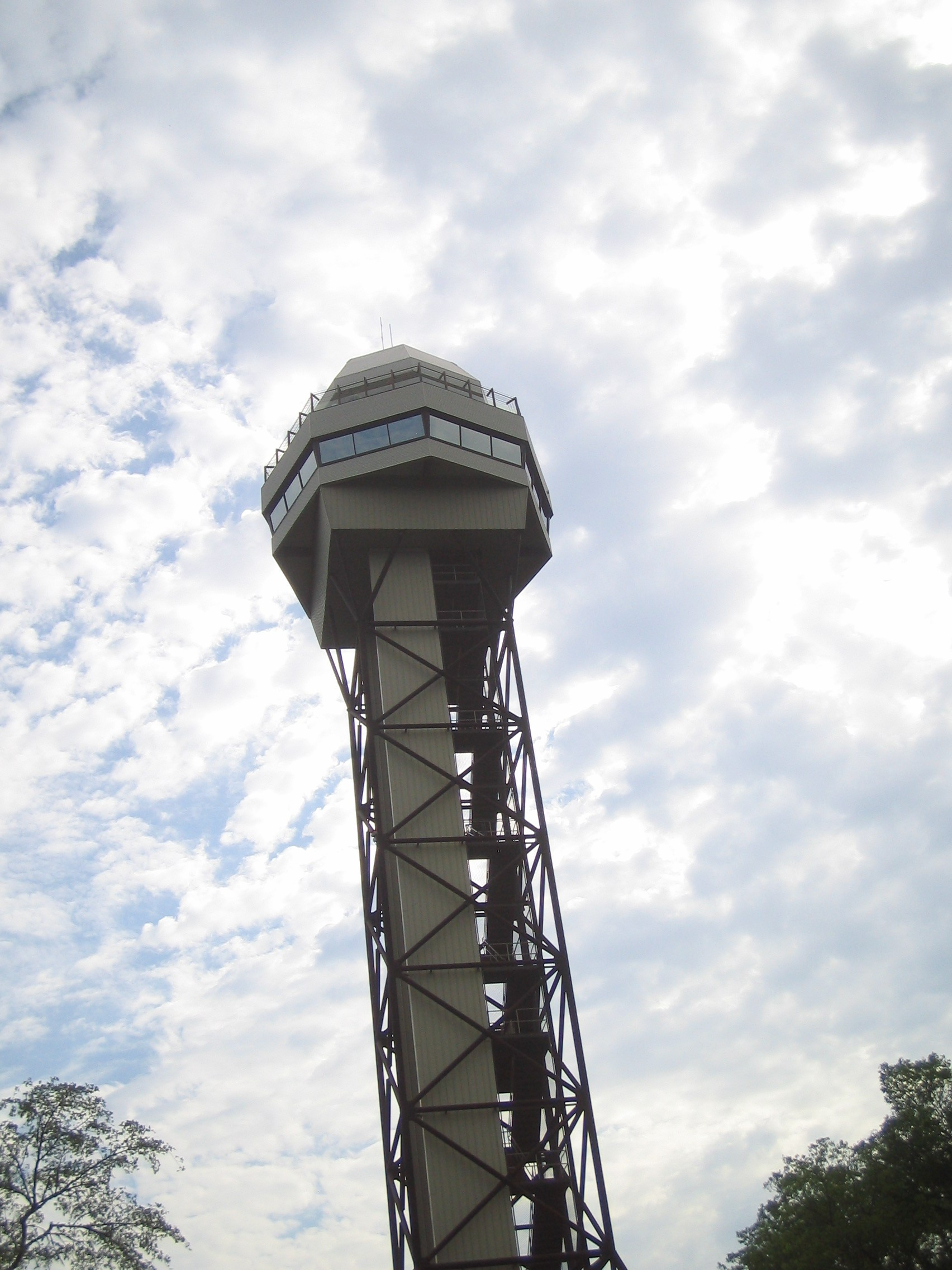
Hot Springs Mountain Tower in 2009
