= Hot Springs, Arkansas =

- City
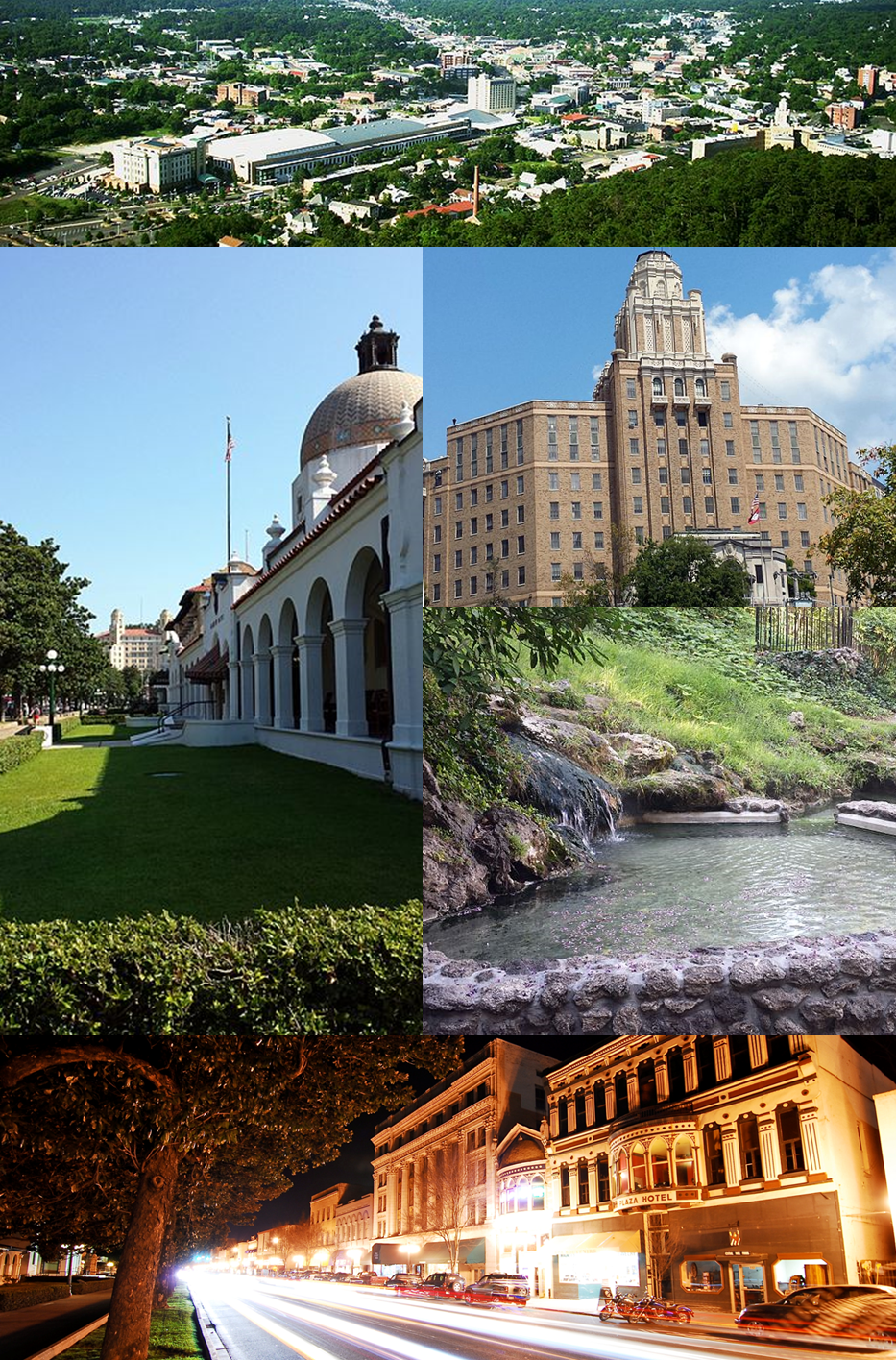
- Clockwise from top: Aerial view of Hot Springs, Army-Navy Hospital, a pool of hot spring water in Hot Springs National Park, the Central Avenue Historic District, Bathhouse Row

- Flag Logo
- Nicknames: Valley of the Vapors, Spa City
- Motto: "America's First Resort"
- Location of Hot Springs in Garland County, Arkansas

- Location in Arkansas Location in the United States
- Coordinates: 34°30′13″N 93°3′19″W
- Country: United States
- State: Arkansas
- County: Garland
- Incorporated: January 10, 1851 (175 years ago)

Government
  - Type: Council-manager
  - Mayor: Pat McCabe

Area
  - City: 37.57 sq mi (97.31 km^{2})
  - Land: 37.45 sq mi (97.00 km^{2})
  - Water: 0.12 sq mi (0.31 km^{2})
- Elevation: 568 ft (173 m)

Population (2020)
  - City: 37,930
  - Estimate (2025): 37,979 ▲
  - Density: 1,012.8/sq mi (391.04/km^{2})
  - Metro: 100,180
- Time zone: UTC−6 (Central (CST))
  - Summer (DST): UTC−5 (CDT)
- ZIP code: 71901-03, 71913-14
- Area code: 501
- FIPS code: 05-33400
- GNIS feature ID: 2404733
- Website: hotspringsar.gov

Hot Springs is a resort city in the state of Arkansas, United States, and the county seat of Garland County. The city is located in the Ouachita Mountains among the U.S. Interior Highlands, and is set among several natural hot springs for which the city is named. As of the 2020 United States census, the city had a population of 37,930, making it the eleventh-most populous city in Arkansas.

The center of Hot Springs is the oldest federal reserve in the United States, today preserved as Hot Springs National Park. The hot spring water has been popularly believed for centuries to possess healing properties, and was a subject of legend among several Native American tribes. Following federal protection in 1832, the city developed into a successful spa town. Incorporated January 10, 1851, the city has been home to Major League Baseball spring training, illegal gambling, speakeasies, and gangsters such as Al Capone, Charles "Lucky" Luciano, Frank Costello, and Bugs Moran. It also features the childhood home of the 42nd U.S. President, Bill Clinton. One of the largest Pentecostal denominations in the United States, the Assemblies of God, traces its beginnings to Hot Springs, as do horse racing at Oaklawn Park and the Army and Navy Hospital.

Much of Hot Springs' history is preserved by various government entities. Hot Springs National Park is maintained by the National Park Service and includes Bathhouse Row, which preserves the eight historic bathhouse buildings and gardens along Central Avenue. Downtown Hot Springs is preserved as the Central Avenue Historic District, listed on the National Register of Historic Places. The city also contains dozens of historic hotels and motor courts, built during the Great Depression in the Art Deco style. Due to the popularity of the thermal waters, Hot Springs benefited from rapid growth during a period when many cities saw a sharp decline in building—much like Miami's Art Deco districts. As a result, Hot Springs's architecture is a key part of the city's blend of cultures, including a reputation as a tourist town and a Southern city. Also a destination for the arts, Hot Springs hosts the Hot Springs Music Festival, Hot Springs Documentary Film Festival, and the Valley of the Vapors Independent Music Festival.

== History ==
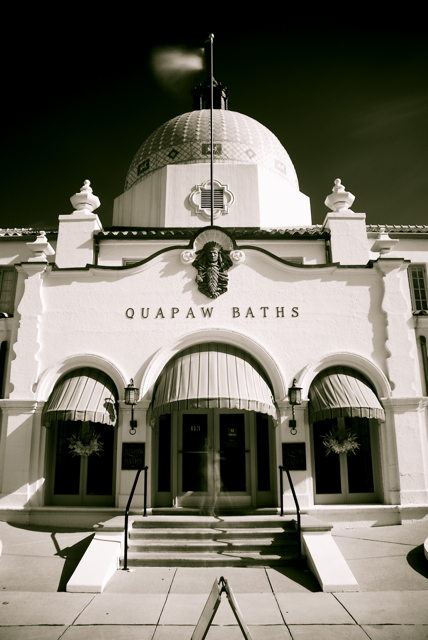
The Quapaw Bathhouse, along Hot Springs' famed "Bathhouse Row"

=== Settlement ===
Members of many Native American tribes had been gathering in the valley for untold numbers of years to enjoy the healing properties of the thermal springs.

In 1673, Father Marquette and Jolliet explored the area and claimed it for France. The 1763 Treaty of Paris ceded the land to Spain; however, in 1800, control was returned to France until the Louisiana Purchase of 1803.

In December 1804, George Hunter and William Dunbar made an expedition to the springs, finding a lone log cabin and a few rudimentary shelters used by people visiting the springs for their healing properties. In 1807, a man named Prudhomme became the first settler of modern Hot Springs, and he was soon joined by John Perciful and Isaac Cates.

On August 24, 1818, the Quapaw Native Americans ceded the land around the hot springs to the United States in a treaty. After Arkansas became its own territory in 1819, the Arkansas Territorial Legislature requested in 1820 that the springs and adjoining mountains be set aside as a federal reservation. Twelve years later, in 1832, the Hot Springs Reservation was created by the United States Congress, granting federal protection of the thermal waters. The reservation was renamed Hot Springs National Park in 1921.

=== Civil War ===
The outbreak of the American Civil War left Hot Springs with a declining bathing population. After the Confederate forces suffered defeat in the Battle of Pea Ridge in March 1862, the Union troops advanced toward the Confederate city of Little Rock. Confederate Governor Henry M. Rector moved his staff and state records to Hot Springs. Union forces did not attack Little Rock, and the government returned to the capital city on July 14, 1862.

Many residents of Hot Springs fled to Texas or Louisiana and remained there until the end of the war. In September 1863, Union forces occupied Little Rock. During this period, Hot Springs became the prey of guerrilla bands loosely associated with either Union or Confederate forces. They pillaged and burned the near-deserted town, leaving only a few buildings standing at the end of the Civil War.

=== Rebuilding ===
After the Civil War, extensive rebuilding of bathhouses and hotels took place at Hot Springs. The year-round population soared to 1,200 inhabitants by 1870. By 1873 six bathhouses and 24 hotels and boardinghouses stood near the springs. In 1873, Hot Springs became the county seat of the newly formed Garland County. Prior to 1873, the city had been a part of Hot Spring County. In 1874, Joseph Reynolds announced his decision to construct a narrow-gauge railroad from Malvern to Hot Springs; completion in 1875 resulted in the growth of visitation to the springs. Samuel W. Fordyce and two other entrepreneurs financed the construction of the first luxury hotel in the area, the first Arlington Hotel, which opened in 1875.

During the Reconstruction Era, several conflicting land claims reached the U.S. Congress and resulted on April 24, 1876, Supreme Court ruling that the land title of Hot Springs belonged to the federal government. Protests ensued. To deal with the situation, Congress formed the Hot Springs Commission to lay out streets in the town of Hot Springs, deal with land claims, define property lines, condemn buildings illegally on the permanent reservation (now the national park), and define a process for claimants to purchase land. The commission surveyed and set aside 264.93 acres (1.0721 km^{2}) encompassing the hot springs and Hot Springs Mountain to be a permanent government reservation. Another 1,200 acres (4.9 km^{2}) became the Hot Springs townsite, with 700 acres (2.8 km^{2}) awarded to claimants. The townsite consisted of 196 blocks and 50 miles (80 km) of streets and alleys. The remaining portion of the original four sections of government land consisted of hills and mountains which were mostly unoccupied, and Congress acted on the commission's recommendation in June 1880 by adding those lands to the permanent reservation.

Hot Springs was incorporated on April 5, 1876, after 467 people signed a petition presented to Judge J.W. Jordan. On March 5, 1878, a fire that lasted for eight hours destroyed large areas of the town and left over 1,000 people homeless. The town relied on springs and wells for its water before the Hot Springs Water Company was created in 1882.

Frank Flynn was a gambler who came to Hot Springs in the 1870s. All of the gambling operations in areas controlled by him needed to be sanctioned by him. In 1882, Flynn destroyed two gambling clubs operated by Jim K. Lane. Lane returned with S.A. Doran, a former officer in the Confederate Army, in 1884. In February 1884, Doran and his men ambushed Frank and his two brothers while they were riding in a buggy. The driver of the buggy and two gamblers were killed, while Frank was wounded. Chief of Police Thomas Toler and a mob drove out Doran and his men. However, Ed Howell, one of Doran's men, refused to leave and threatened to kill Tolet, but was killed by Tolet.

=== Baseball in Hot Springs ===
Hot Springs has a rich baseball history. During the early 20th century, Hot Springs was known for baseball training camps. Often called the "birthplace" of Spring training baseball, Hot Springs first welcomed Major League Baseball in 1886, when the Chicago White Stockings (now the Chicago Cubs), brought their coaches and players to the city in preparation for the upcoming season. Chicago White Stockings' President Albert Spalding, the founder of A.G Spalding, and player/manager Cap Anson introduced the concept of players having training and fitness before the start of the regular season, This move gave credit to Hot Springs being called the "birthplace of spring training baseball". Both Spalding and Anson liked the city and the natural springs for their players. They first played in an area behind what is now the Garland County Courthouse on Ouachita Avenue at was called the Hot Springs Baseball Grounds. Many other teams followed Chicago and began training and playing games in Hot Springs.

The Cleveland Spiders, Pittsburgh Pirates, Brooklyn Dodgers, Chicago Cubs, Cincinnati Reds, Detroit Tigers, New York Yankees, St. Louis Cardinals and Boston Red Sox were among the major league teams that made Hot Springs their home for Spring training. Needing additional venues for teams to play, Whittington Park was built in 1894, followed by Majestic Park in 1908 and Fogel Field in 1912. 134 members of the Baseball Hall of Fame are documented to have trained or played in Hot Springs.

Negro league baseball teams also utilized Hot Springs for spring training. The Pittsburgh Crawfords utilized Fogel Field for spring training from 1932 to 1935. Their roster contained Baseball Hall of Fame Inductees Cool Papa Bell, Josh Gibson, Oscar Charleston and Judy Johnson. The Homestead Grays, held spring training at Fogel Field in 1930 and 1931. On their roster were numerous Hall of Fame players: Cool Papa Bell, Josh Gibson, Oscar Charleston, Jud Wilson, Bill Foster, Judy Johnson, Smokey Joe Williams, Willie Wells and Cum Posey.

St. Patrick's Day, 1918, is nicknamed the "Day that changed Baseball Forever." Boston Red Sox' pitcher Babe Ruth hit a long Home Run into the Arkansas Alligator Farm and Petting Zoo that altered the course of baseball history. In the opening exhibition game against Brooklyn at Whittington Park, Ruth (coming off a 24–13 season) was a last-minute replacement at first base, his first time at a position other than pitcher. Ruth hit two long home runs that day while playing the field for the first time. His first home run was a long blast that landed in a woodpile. However, his second Home run is legendary in its record-setting length and eventual effect on Ruth. It was a shot that traveled an astonishing estimated 573 feet.

After that day Ruth became a hitter, switching from being just a pitcher. In Hot Springs, Ruth could be seen walking the streets, visiting the bath spas, and gambling at the nearby horse track. There is a Ruth plaque both inside and outside the Alligator Farm, as well as a home plate marker at the former Whittington Park across the street.

The Pittsburgh Pirates trained for over a decade at Whittington Park. Hall of Fame shortstop Honus Wagner became a fixture in the city. As evidence of this, Wagner purchased and donated basketball uniforms and equipment to Hot Springs High School in 1912. The uniforms were in the Pittsburgh Pirates colors of black and gold, and subsequently, the high school switched permanently to those colors. Wagner also refereed a basketball game for the school that season, something he would later repeat.

In 1952, an 18-year old Hank Aaron played in the Negro American League championship for the Indianapolis Clowns against the Birmingham Black Barons at Majestic Park.

On October 22, 1953, Jackie Robinson played in an exhibition game at Majestic Park. Having broken Major League Baseball's color barrier in 1947, Robinson's squad played the Negro American League All-Stars that day, losing 14–9.

The First Boys of Spring is a 2015 documentary covering the history of Hot Springs Baseball spring training. The film features many Hot Springs historical items and references. Produced by Arkansas filmmaker Larry Foley, it is narrated by Hot Springs area native, actor Billy Bob Thornton. The Foley documentary is aired nationally on the MLB Network, first airing in February 2016.

Today, as part of the Hot Springs Baseball Historic Trail there are 26 green plaques/markers posted throughout Hot Springs that identify the key people and locations, with an app available to provide live information.

=== 1913 fire ===
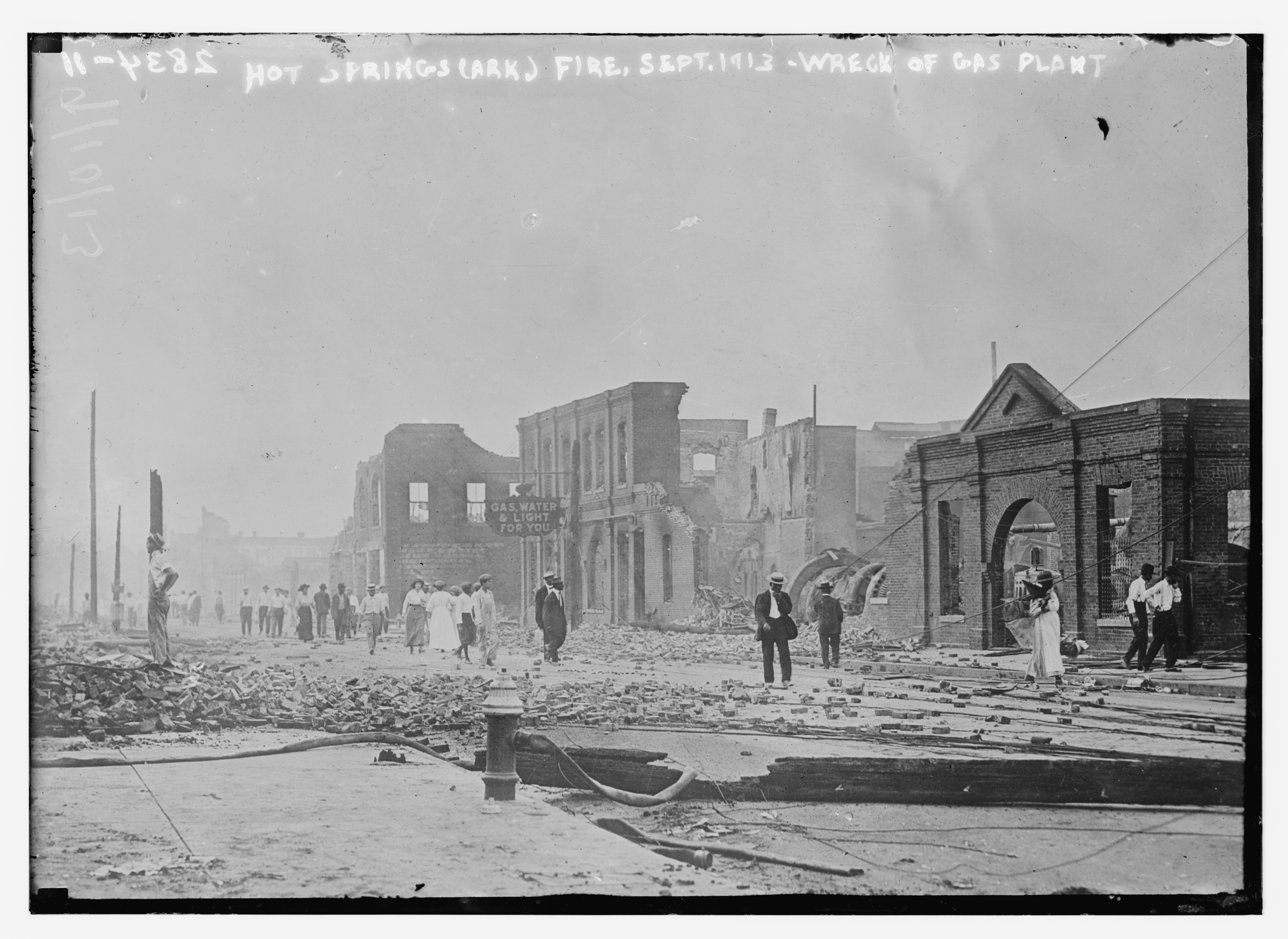
September 10, 1913, with remnants of the fire

On September 5, 1913, a fire broke out on Church Street, a few blocks southeast of Bathhouse Row, near the Army and Navy Hospital. The fire burned southeast, away from the hospital, until the wind reversed an hour later. Racing toward the business section, it destroyed the Ozark Sanitarium and Hot Springs High School on its way across Malvern Avenue. Along the way, it consumed the Public Utilities plant, which destroyed the firefighters' water supply. A wide front then was blown toward Ouachita Avenue which destroyed the Garland County Court House. The Hot Springs Fire Department fought alongside the Little Rock Fire Department, which had rushed over on a special train. Despite their efforts, numerous homes, at least a hundred businesses, four hotels, the Iron Mountain Railroad facilities, and the Crystal Theater were destroyed. A rainstorm finally quenched the blaze at Hazel Street. Although Central Avenue was ultimately protected (primarily by desperate use of dynamite), much of the southern part of the city was destroyed. Damage was estimated at $10,000,000 across 60 blocks.

=== Formation of the Assemblies of God ===
From April 2–12, 1914, several Pentecostal Christian leaders gathered in Hot Springs to form what became known as the Assemblies of God. It has since grown to become one of the largest Pentecostal denominations in the United States, with 3,146,741 adherents, 12,849 churches, and 36,884 ministers (as of 2014).

=== Gangsters and illegal gambling ===
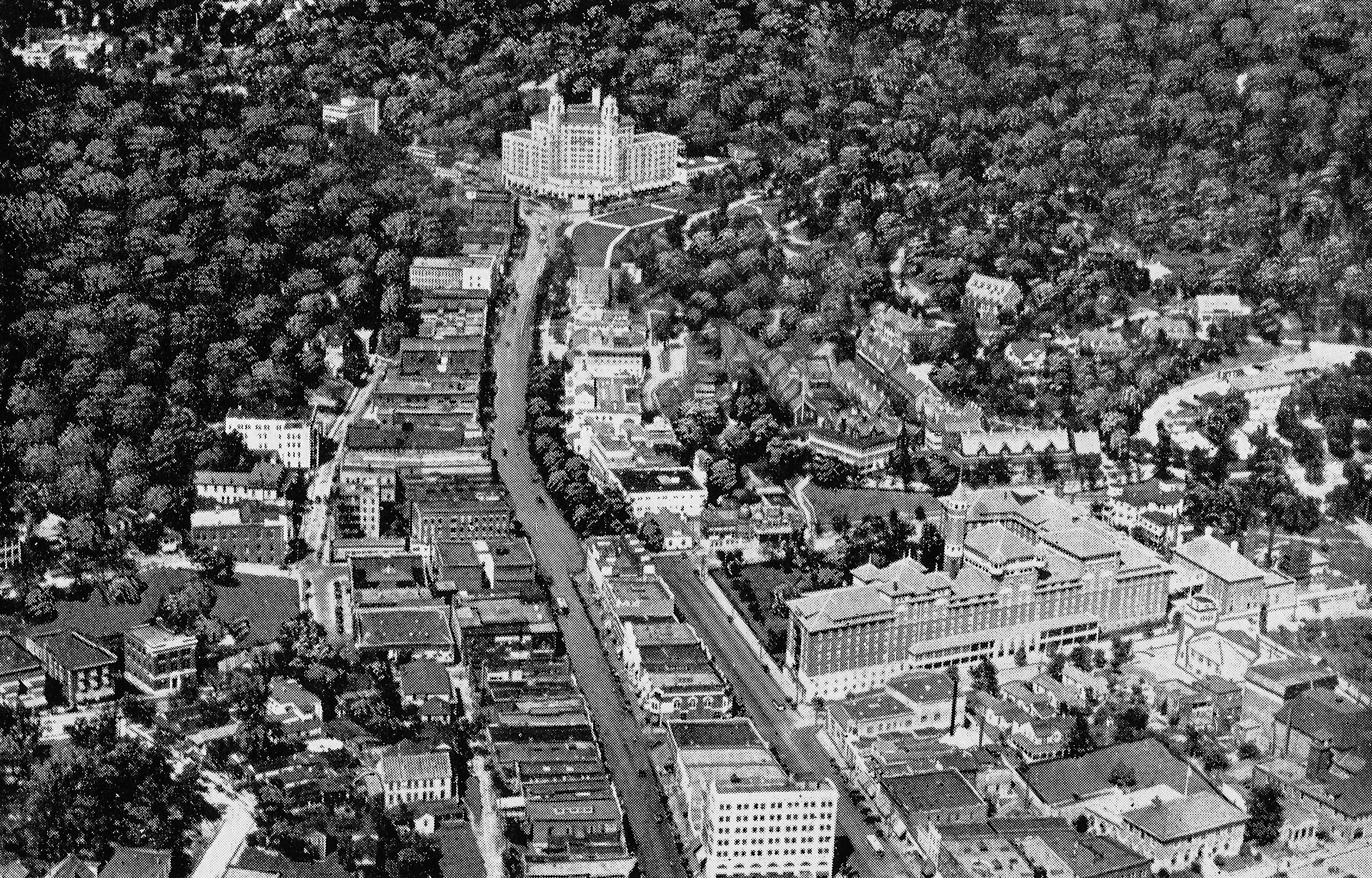
Aerial view of Hot Springs after 1925 along Central Avenue. The base of Hot Springs Mountain is in the top right, behind Bathhouse Row. Part of West Mountain is on the left. The southwest edge of North Mountain is behind the Arlington Hotel at top.

Illegal gambling became firmly established in Hot Springs during the decades following the Civil War, with two factions, the Flynns and the Dorans, fighting one another throughout the 1880s for control of the town. Frank Flynn, leader of the Flynn Faction, had effectively begun paying local law enforcement officers employed by both the Hot Springs Police Department and the Garland County Sheriff's Office to collect unpaid debts, as well as to intimidate gambling rivals. This contributed to the March 16, 1899, Hot Springs Gunfight. Of the seven Hot Springs police officers who have been killed while in service of the department, three died during that gunfight, killed by deputies of the Garland County Sheriff's Office. The Hot Springs officers also killed one part-time deputy sheriff.

Along with Bathhouse Row, one of downtown Hot Springs' most noted landmarks is the Arlington Hotel, a favored retreat for Al Capone.

Hot Springs eventually became a national gambling mecca, led by Owney Madden and his Hotel Arkansas casino. The period 1927–1947 was its wagering pinnacle, with no fewer than ten major casinos and numerous smaller houses running wide open, the largest such operation in the United States at the time. Hotels advertised the availability of prostitutes, and off-track booking was available for virtually any horse race in North America.

Local law enforcement was controlled by a political machine run by long-serving mayor Leo McLaughlin. The McLaughlin organization purchased hundreds of poll tax receipts, many in the names of deceased or fictitious persons, which would sometimes be voted in different precincts. A former sheriff, who attempted to have the state's anti-gambling laws enforced and to secure honest elections, was murdered in 1937. No one was ever charged with his killing. Machine domination of city and county government was abruptly ended in 1946 with the election of a "Government Improvement" slate of returning World War II veterans led by Marine Lt. Col. Sid McMath, who was elected prosecuting attorney. A 1947 grand jury indicted several owners and promoters, as well as McLaughlin, for public servant bribery. Although the former mayor and most of the others were acquitted, the machine's power was broken and gambling came to a halt, as McMath led a statewide "GI Revolt" into the governor's office in 1948. Illegal casino gambling resumed, however, with the election of Orval Faubus as governor in 1954. Buoyed into 12 years in office by his popular defiance of federal court desegregation orders, Faubus turned a blind eye to gambling in Hot Springs. Variety explained the status of the casinos in 1959 as follows: "How do these places operate when gambling and mixed drinks are supposedly against the law? Simple. Every week the management appears in local court, pays its fine according to the amount of biz [business] done and goes back to open up."

Gambling was finally closed down in 1967 by two Republican officeholders, Governor Winthrop Rockefeller and Circuit Judge Henry M. Britt. Rockefeller sent in a company of state troopers to shutter the casinos and burn their gaming equipment. Until other forms of gambling became legal in Arkansas four decades later, Oaklawn Park, a thoroughbred horse racing track south of downtown, was the only legal gambling establishment in Hot Springs and one of only two in the state of Arkansas; the other was the Southland Greyhound Park dog track in West Memphis. Both Oaklawn and Southland remain in operation.

=== Army-Navy Hospital ===
After the Civil War, the idea of establishing an Army-Navy hospital in Hot Springs was advocated by A.S. Garnett, a former Navy surgeon with a local practice, and John A. Logan, a retired Union general turned politician who was a former patient of Garnett's. In 1882, Logan persuaded Congress to allocate $100,000 for the purpose. Erected under the supervision of Captain J.W. Jacobs, the 100-bed hospital was built of wood and brick in the "pavilion style" that required patients and clinicians to traverse long distances.

After World War I, Congress granted $1.5 million to build a new facility. Built under Captain Edward George, it could hold 500 patients and contained such cutting-edge technology as an X-ray wing and temperature-controlled morgue. The operating rooms and equipment were thought to be the finest in the country.

After the United States entered World War II, the hospital was once again overwhelmed. The Army and Navy arranged to send some overflow to the nearby Arlington and Majestic hotels. The hospital also trained dentists, surgeons, and pharmacists, and housed the first enlisted medical technician school for the Women's Army Corps. The grounds contained a kitchen and living quarters for nurses and physicians. Famous people treated at the hospital included Joe DiMaggio. The hospital was closed on April 1, 1960, likely because local demand dropped. The grounds were sold to the state of Arkansas for one dollar.

=== World War II ===
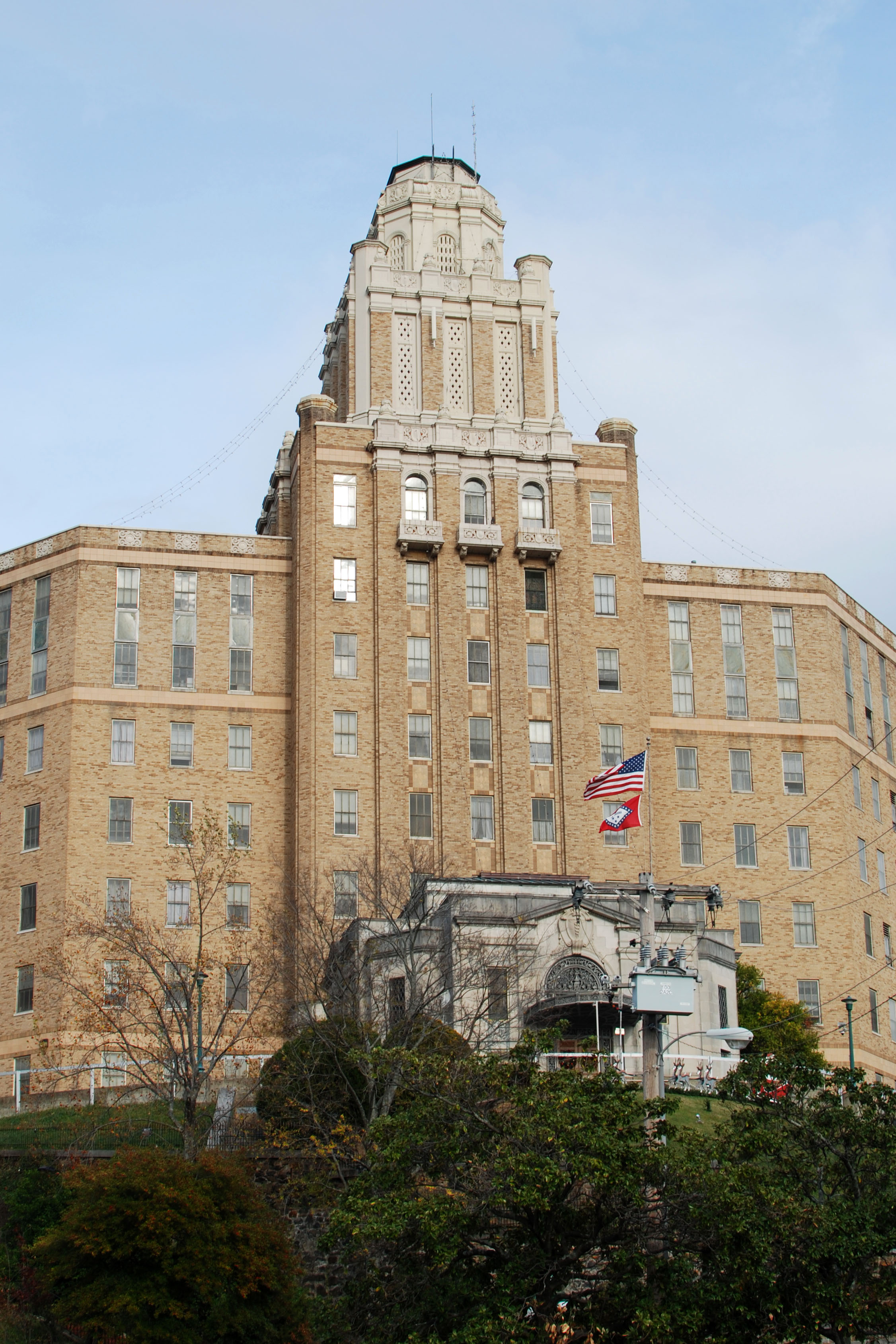
Hot Springs Rehabilitation Center—now known as Arkansas Career Training Institute—was formerly an Army and Navy Hospital.

The military took over the enormous Eastman Hotel across the street from the Army and Navy Hospital in 1942 because the hospital was not nearly large enough to hold the sick and wounded coming in. In 1944, the Army began redeploying returning overseas soldiers; officials inspected hotels in 20 cities before selecting Hot Springs as a redistribution center for returning soldiers. In August 1944, the Army took over most of the hotels in Hot Springs. The soldiers from the west-central states received a 21-day furlough before reporting to the redistribution station. They spent 14 days updating their military records and obtaining physical and dental treatment. The soldiers had time to enjoy the baths at a reduced rate and other recreational activities. The redistribution center closed down in December 1945 after processing more than 32,000 members of the military. In 1946, after the war, the Eastman was demolished when the federal government no longer needed it.

=== 21st century ===
In 2013, the metro was ranked by Forbes as one of the top "small places for business and careers", citing a low cost of doing business, high job growth and an educated workforce. The first cannabis dispensary in the state opened in May 2019 in the city.

== Geography ==
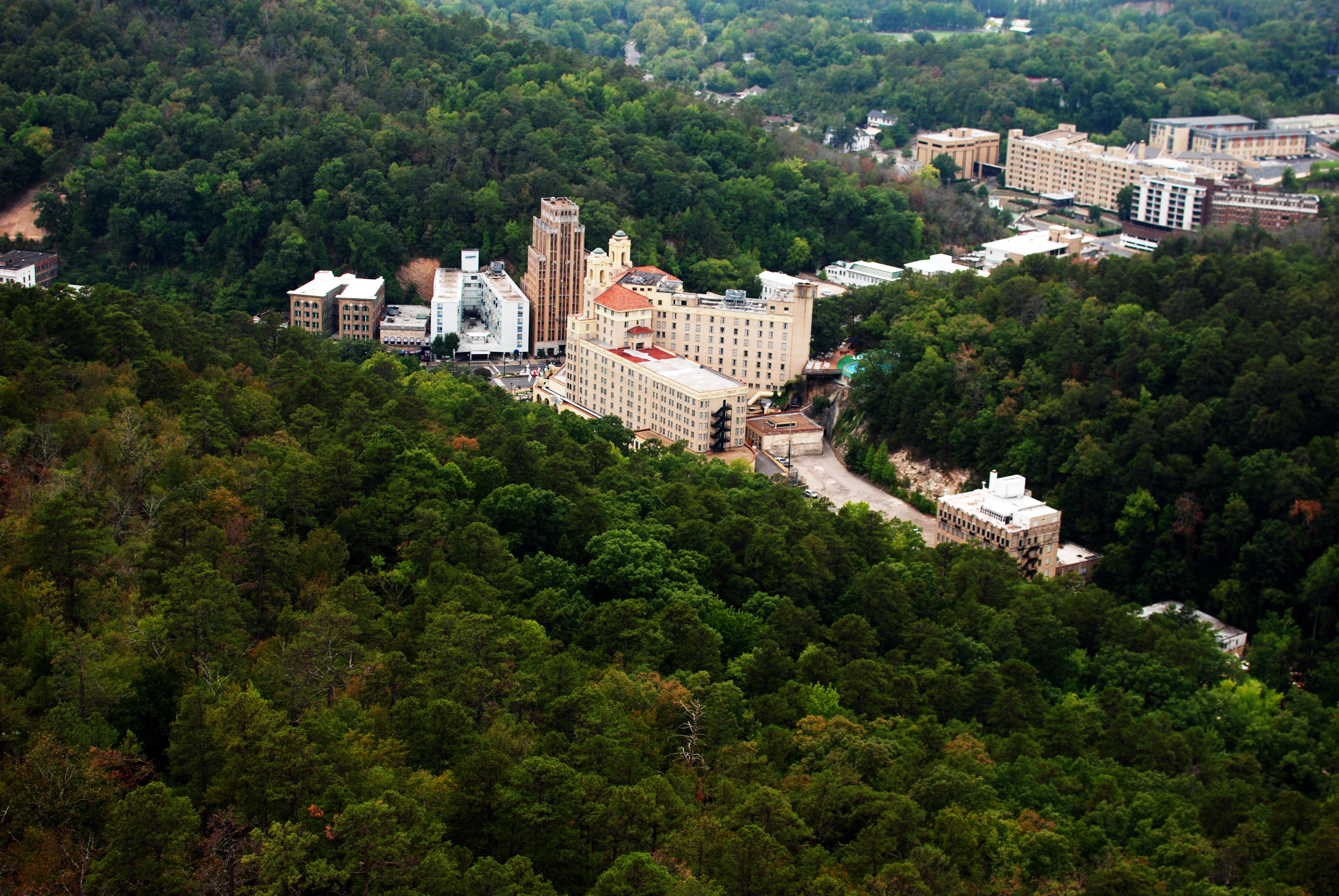
Downtown Hot Springs, as seen from mountain overlook

Hot Springs is located in southeastern Garland County. It sits at the southeastern edge of the Ouachita Mountains and is 55 miles (89 km) southwest of Little Rock.

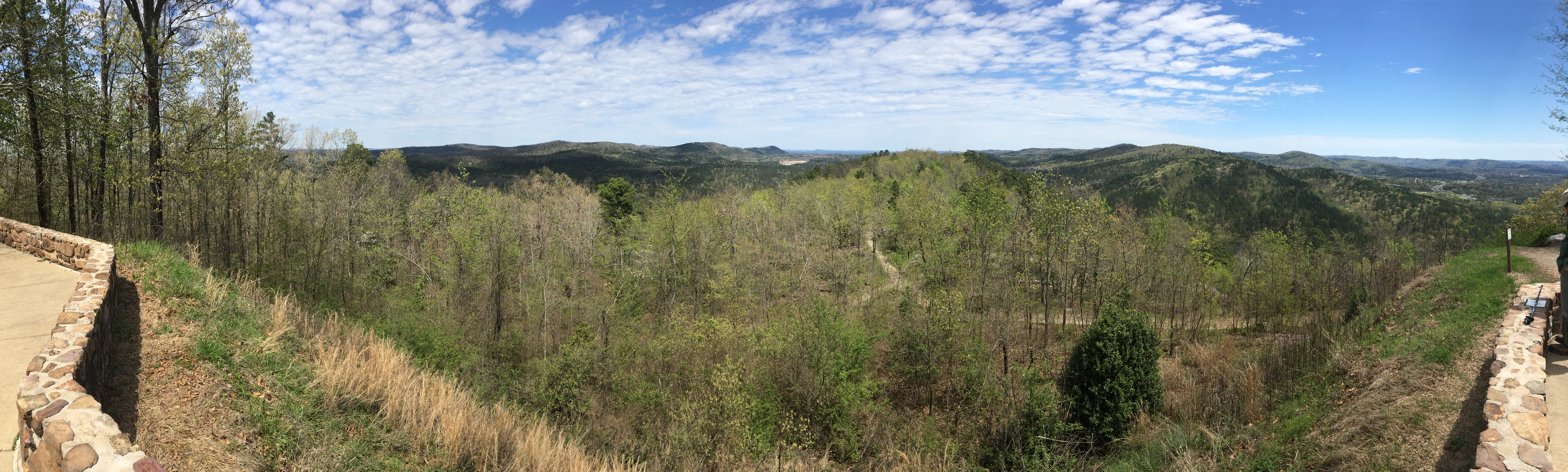
Hot Springs National Park

According to the United States Census Bureau, the city of Hot Springs has a total area of 35.1 square miles (91.0 km^{2}), of which 35.0 square miles (90.7 km^{2}) is land and 0.1 square miles (0.3 km^{2}), or 0.35%, is water.

=== Natural springs ===
The city takes its name from the natural thermal water that flows from 47 springs on the western slope of Hot Springs Mountain in the historic downtown district of the city. About 1,000,000 US gallons (3.8 ML) of 143 °F (62 °C) water flow from the springs each day. The flow rate is not affected by fluctuations in the rainfall in the area. Studies by National Park Service scientists have determined through radiocarbon dating that the water that reaches the surface in Hot Springs fell as rainfall 4,400 years earlier. The water percolates very slowly down through the earth's surface until it reaches superheated areas deep in the crust and then rushes rapidly to the surface to emerge from the 47 hot springs.

Hot Springs Creek flows from Whittington Avenue, then is underground in a tunnel beneath Bathhouse Row (Central Ave). It emerges from the tunnel south of Bathhouse Row, then flows through the southern part of the city before emptying into Lake Hamilton, a reservoir on the Ouachita River.

=== Climate ===
Hot Springs lies in the humid subtropical climate zone (Köppen Cfa). The climate in this area is characterized by hot, humid summers and generally mild to cool winters. July is the hottest month of the year, with an average high of 93.1 °F (33.9 °C) and an average low of 72.1 °F (22.3 °C). The city's highest temperature was 115 °F (46.1 °C), recorded in 1936 and 1986. The lowest temperature recorded was −11 °F (−23.9 °C) in 1930.

Precipitation is weakly seasonal, with a bimodal pattern: wet seasons in the spring and fall, and relatively drier summers and winters, but plentiful rain in all months. The spring wet season is more pronounced than the fall, with the highest rainfall in May. Hot Springs' precipitation is affected by the orographic effect of the Ouachita Mountains.

Climate data for Hot Springs 1 NNE, Arkansas (1991–2020 normals, extremes 1887–present)
Month	Jan	Feb	Mar	Apr	May	Jun	Jul	Aug	Sep	Oct	Nov	Dec	Year
Record high °F (°C)	81 (27)	87 (31)	93 (34)	97 (36)	103 (39)	112 (44)	114 (46)	115 (46)	112 (44)	99 (37)	88 (31)	82 (28)	115 (46)
Mean maximum °F (°C)	70.4 (21.3)	75.1 (23.9)	82.7 (28.2)	87.1 (30.6)	90.8 (32.7)	96.6 (35.9)	102.4 (39.1)	102.3 (39.1)	97.8 (36.6)	89.6 (32.0)	78.2 (25.7)	70.8 (21.6)	104.6 (40.3)
Mean daily maximum °F (°C)	51.7 (10.9)	56.3 (13.5)	64.9 (18.3)	73.7 (23.2)	80.4 (26.9)	88.3 (31.3)	93.1 (33.9)	93.0 (33.9)	86.2 (30.1)	74.8 (23.8)	62.5 (16.9)	53.4 (11.9)	73.2 (22.9)
Daily mean °F (°C)	41.8 (5.4)	45.6 (7.6)	53.6 (12.0)	62.2 (16.8)	70.4 (21.3)	78.3 (25.7)	82.6 (28.1)	82.0 (27.8)	75.0 (23.9)	63.5 (17.5)	52.3 (11.3)	44.1 (6.7)	62.6 (17.0)
Mean daily minimum °F (°C)	32.0 (0.0)	34.9 (1.6)	42.3 (5.7)	50.6 (10.3)	60.4 (15.8)	68.4 (20.2)	72.1 (22.3)	71.0 (21.7)	63.9 (17.7)	52.2 (11.2)	42.0 (5.6)	34.7 (1.5)	52.0 (11.1)
Mean minimum °F (°C)	14.8 (−9.6)	19.7 (−6.8)	25.6 (−3.6)	34.1 (1.2)	45.6 (7.6)	57.8 (14.3)	63.1 (17.3)	60.8 (16.0)	49.4 (9.7)	35.7 (2.1)	26.2 (−3.2)	19.9 (−6.7)	11.8 (−11.2)
Record low °F (°C)	−9 (−23)	−11 (−24)	7 (−14)	24 (−4)	31 (−1)	44 (7)	51 (11)	45 (7)	35 (2)	20 (−7)	14 (−10)	−5 (−21)	−11 (−24)
Average precipitation inches (mm)	3.76 (96)	4.64 (118)	5.53 (140)	5.86 (149)	6.51 (165)	4.33 (110)	4.52 (115)	3.60 (91)	4.18 (106)	5.10 (130)	4.94 (125)	4.99 (127)	57.96 (1,472)
Average snowfall inches (cm)	0.6 (1.5)	0.4 (1.0)	0.1 (0.25)	0.0 (0.0)	0.0 (0.0)	0.0 (0.0)	0.0 (0.0)	0.0 (0.0)	0.0 (0.0)	0.0 (0.0)	0.0 (0.0)	0.0 (0.0)	1.1 (2.8)
Average precipitation days (≥ 0.01 in)	9.6	9.8	10.9	9.5	11.1	8.3	8.7	8.0	7.6	7.9	9.0	9.6	110.0
Average snowy days (≥ 0.1 in)	0.2	0.3	0.1	0.0	0.0	0.0	0.0	0.0	0.0	0.0	0.0	0.0	0.6
Source: NOAA

== Demographics ==
Historical population
Census	Pop.	Note	%±
1860	201		—
1870	1,276		534.8%
1880	3,554		178.5%
1890	8,086		127.5%
1900	9,973		23.3%
1910	14,434		44.7%
1920	11,695		−19.0%
1930	20,238		73.0%
1940	21,370		5.6%
1950	29,307		37.1%
1960	28,337		−3.3%
1970	35,631		25.7%
1980	35,781		0.4%
1990	32,462		−9.3%
2000	35,750		10.1%
2010	35,193		−1.6%
2020	37,930		7.8%
2025 (est.)	37,979	▲	0.1%
U.S. Decennial Census

As of the 2020 census, the Hot Springs metropolitan area—which includes all of Garland County—had a population of 100,180 according to the United States Census Bureau.

=== Racial and ethnic composition ===
Hot Springs city, Arkansas – Racial and ethnic composition Note: the US Census treats Hispanic/Latino as an ethnic category. This table excludes Latinos from the racial categories and assigns them to a separate category. Hispanics/Latinos may be of any race.
Race / Ethnicity (NH = Non-Hispanic)	Pop. 2000	Pop. 2010	Pop. 2020	% 2000	% 2010	% 2020
White alone (NH)	27,347	25,269	24,695	76.50%	71.80%	65.11%
Black or African American alone (NH)	5,990	5,880	6,215	16.76%	16.71%	16.39%
Native American or Alaska Native alone (NH)	188	196	252	0.53%	0.56%	0.66%
Asian alone (NH)	274	300	529	0.77%	0.85%	1.39%
Native Hawaiian or Pacific Islander alone (NH)	12	8	31	0.03%	0.02%	0.08%
Other race alone (NH)	15	32	136	0.04%	0.09%	0.36%
Mixed race or Multiracial (NH)	566	877	2,434	1.58%	2.49%	6.42%
Hispanic or Latino (any race)	1,358	2,631	3,638	3.80%	7.48%	9.59%
Total	35,750	35,193	37,930	100.00%	100.00%	100.00%

=== 2020 census ===
As of the 2020 census, Hot Springs had a population of 37,930 and 17,102 households, including 8,363 families. The median age was 44.5 years. 20.1% of residents were under the age of 18 and 24.0% of residents were 65 years of age or older. For every 100 females there were 88.5 males, and for every 100 females age 18 and over there were 84.8 males age 18 and over.

98.6% of residents lived in urban areas, while 1.4% lived in rural areas.

There were 17,102 households in Hot Springs, of which 23.5% had children under the age of 18 living in them. Of all households, 33.3% were married-couple households, 21.7% were households with a male householder and no spouse or partner present, and 37.7% were households with a female householder and no spouse or partner present. About 39.4% of all households were made up of individuals and 19.1% had someone living alone who was 65 years of age or older.

There were 21,060 housing units, of which 18.8% were vacant. The homeowner vacancy rate was 2.8% and the rental vacancy rate was 12.3%.

Racial composition as of the 2020 census
Race	Number	Percent
White	25,393	66.9%
Black or African American	6,275	16.5%
American Indian and Alaska Native	344	0.9%
Asian	537	1.4%
Native Hawaiian and Other Pacific Islander	31	0.1%
Some other race	1,910	5.0%
Two or more races	3,440	9.1%

=== 2000 census ===
As of the census of 2000, there were 35,750 people, 16,096 households, and 9,062 families residing in the city. The population density was 1,086.9 inhabitants per square mile (419.7/km^{2}). There were 18,813 housing units at an average density of 572.0 per square mile (220.9/km^{2}). The racial makeup of the city was 78.86% White, 16.87% Black or African American, 0.55% Native American, 0.79% Asian, 0.05% Pacific Islander, 1.02% from other races, and 1.86% from two or more races. 3.80% of the population were Hispanic or Latino of any race.

There were 16,096 households, out of which 22.0% had children under the age of 18 living with them, 40.2% were married couples living together, 12.4% had a female householder with no husband present, and 43.7% were classified as non-families by the United States Census Bureau. Of 16,096 households, 690 are unmarried partner households: 580 heterosexual, 78 same-sex male, and 32 same-sex female. 38.4% of all households were made up of individuals, and 18.3% had someone living alone who was 65 years of age or older. The average household size was 2.12, and the average family size was 2.80.

In the city, the population was spread out, with 20.2% under the age of 18, 8.2% from 18 to 24, 25.4% from 25 to 44, 23.0% from 45 to 64, and 23.2% who were 65 years of age or older. The median age was 42 years. For every 100 females, there were 88.4 males. For every 100 females age 18 and over, there were 84.6 males.

The median income for a household in the city was $26,040, and the median income for a family was $32,819. Males had a median income of $25,861 versus $20,155 for females. The per capita income for the city was $17,961. About 13.7% of families and 19.2% of the population were below the poverty line, including 30.7% of those under age 18 and 11.7% of those age 65 or over.

== Arts and culture ==
The city has been a tourist mecca for generations due to the thermal waters and attractions such as Oaklawn Park, a thoroughbred racing facility; Magic Springs theme park; a fine arts community that has earned the city the No. 4 position among "America's Top 100 Small Arts Towns"; the Hot Springs Music Festival; and the Hot Springs Documentary Film Festival, held each October at the historic Malco Theater, attracting numerous Academy Award-winning films and producers, Hot Springs International Women's Film Festival screening all genres of films held each year at the Historic Central Theater.

=== Annual cultural events ===
Other annual events in town include the Valley of the Vapors Music Festival, the free Hot Springs Jazz Festival in September, the free Hot Springs Blues Festival in September, the downtown Bathtub Races in the spring, the Big Barbecue Cookoff in spring and fall, the World's Shortest St. Patrick's Day Parade every March 17, and the outdoor skating rink November through January. Venues for live music are Low Key Arts, Maxine's, The Ohio Club, The Big Chill, and the Arlington Hotel, among many others.

Hot Springs Arts & Film Institute's International Horror Film Festival, screens Horror, Thriller and Sci Fi films, each year the festival attracts well known celebrities and industry professionals.

Superlift Offroad Vehicle Park hosts the annual Ouachita Jeep Jamboree, an off-road adventure weekend that draws people and their 4x4's from a dozen states.

Educational institutes and conventions are important events in the spa city. Perhaps the most popular of these events is the Hot Springs Technology Institute (HSTI), drawing over 1,300 participants each June. Hot Springs is also home to the annual alternate reality game Midnight Madness, based on the movie from which it gets its name. Teams race throughout the city at night, solving clues based on difficult puzzles and physical challenges. Games last 12 hours or more, with the winning team designing the following year's game.

=== Sports ===
Hot Springs was announced as the first expansion team and fifth franchise of The Arena League. The team will begin play in 2025.

=== Tourism ===
==== Arkansas Alligator Farm and Petting Zoo ====
Founded on Whittington Avenue in 1902, the Arkansas Alligator Farm and Petting Zoo features approximately 200 alligators. The zoo also contains cougars, turkeys, chickens, wild boars, turtles, bobcats, and ring-tailed lemurs. A petting zoo with goats, emus, llamas, white-tailed deer, pigs, baby alligators, and other animals allows visitors to touch and feed the animals. An alligator feeding show includes educational material about the animals.

==== Bathhouse Row, Hot Springs National Park ====
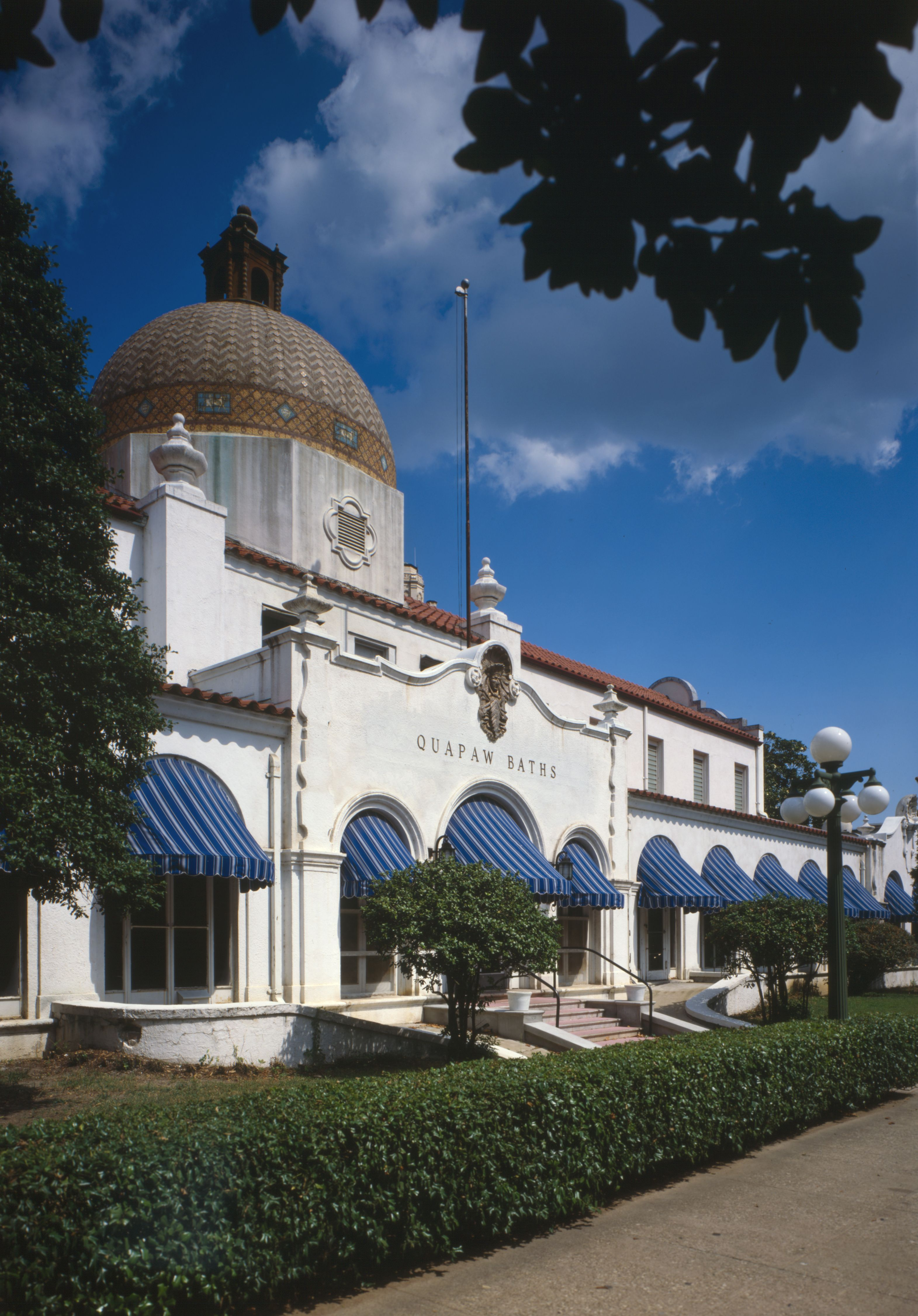
Quapaw Bathhouse

Bathhouse Row, consisting of eight turn-of-the-century historic buildings, lies within Hot Springs National Park and is managed by the National Park Service. Fordyce Bathhouse was restored in 1989 as the park's visitor center and the beginning of restoring all properties on Bathhouse Row. The series of renovations and leasing public spaces to commercial owners became a model for similar projects across the nation.

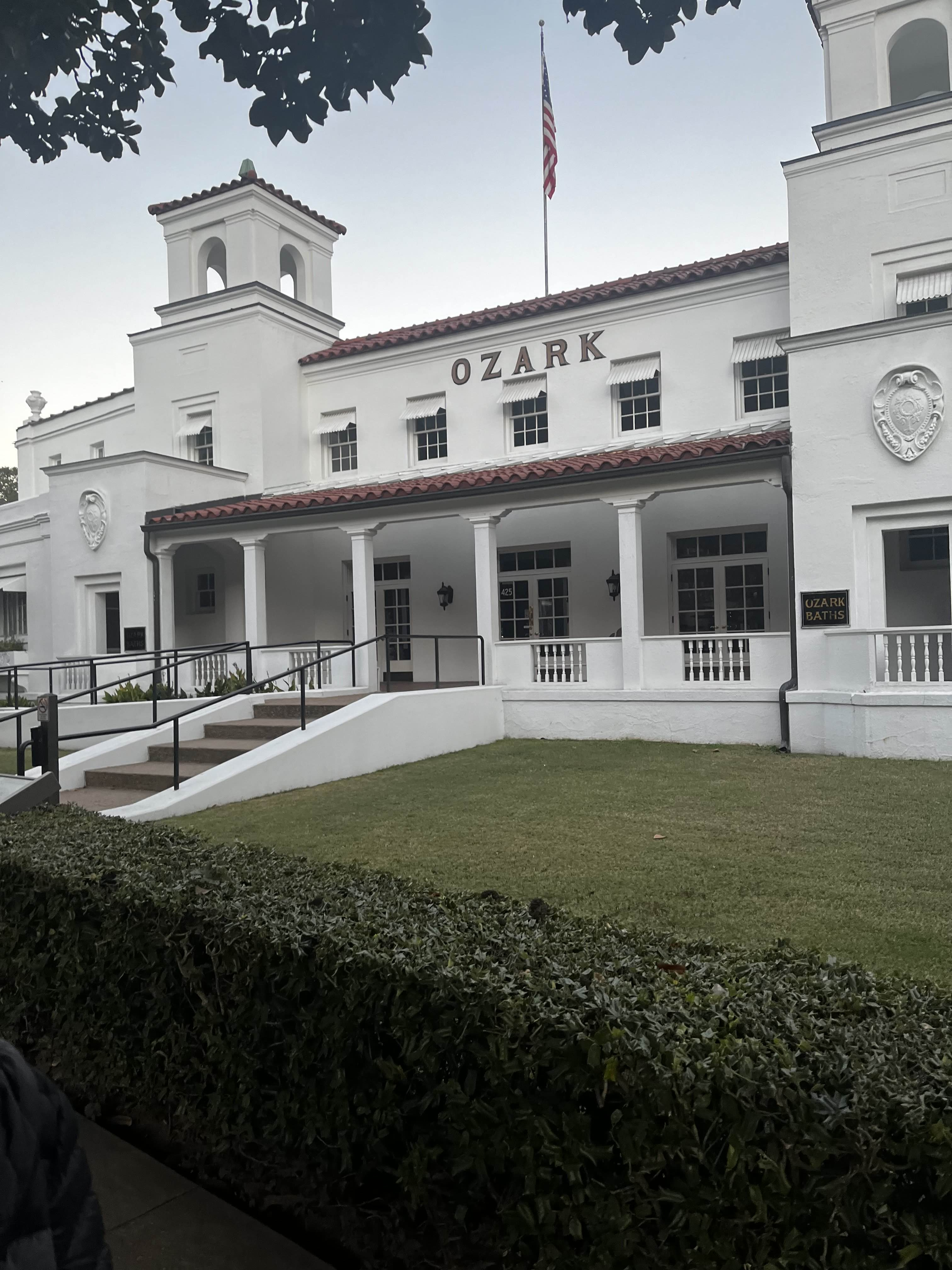
The Ozark Bathhouse in Hot Springs National Park, Arkansas.

Buckstaff Bathhouse has been in continuous operation since 1912 and is one of the best-preserved structures on Bathhouse Row. The Buckstaff Bathhouse Company has completed the majority of maintenance and renovation that has occurred without outside funding. The Quapaw was restored by the NPS in 2004, and the renovated structure was leased to Quapaw Baths, LLC, which now operates a modern spa with pools and hot tubs. The Lamar was renovated into offices for park staff and Bathhouse Row Emporium, the park's official store. The Superior Bathhouse Brewery and Distillery has occupied Superior Bathhouse since 2012, using hot spring water in its beers and spirits. As of February 2014, the Maurice, Ozark, and Hale bathhouses are all available for rent from the NPS.

Atop Hot Springs Mountain in the park is the Hot Springs Mountain Tower, a 216-foot (66 m) observation tower built in 1982.

==== Central Avenue ====
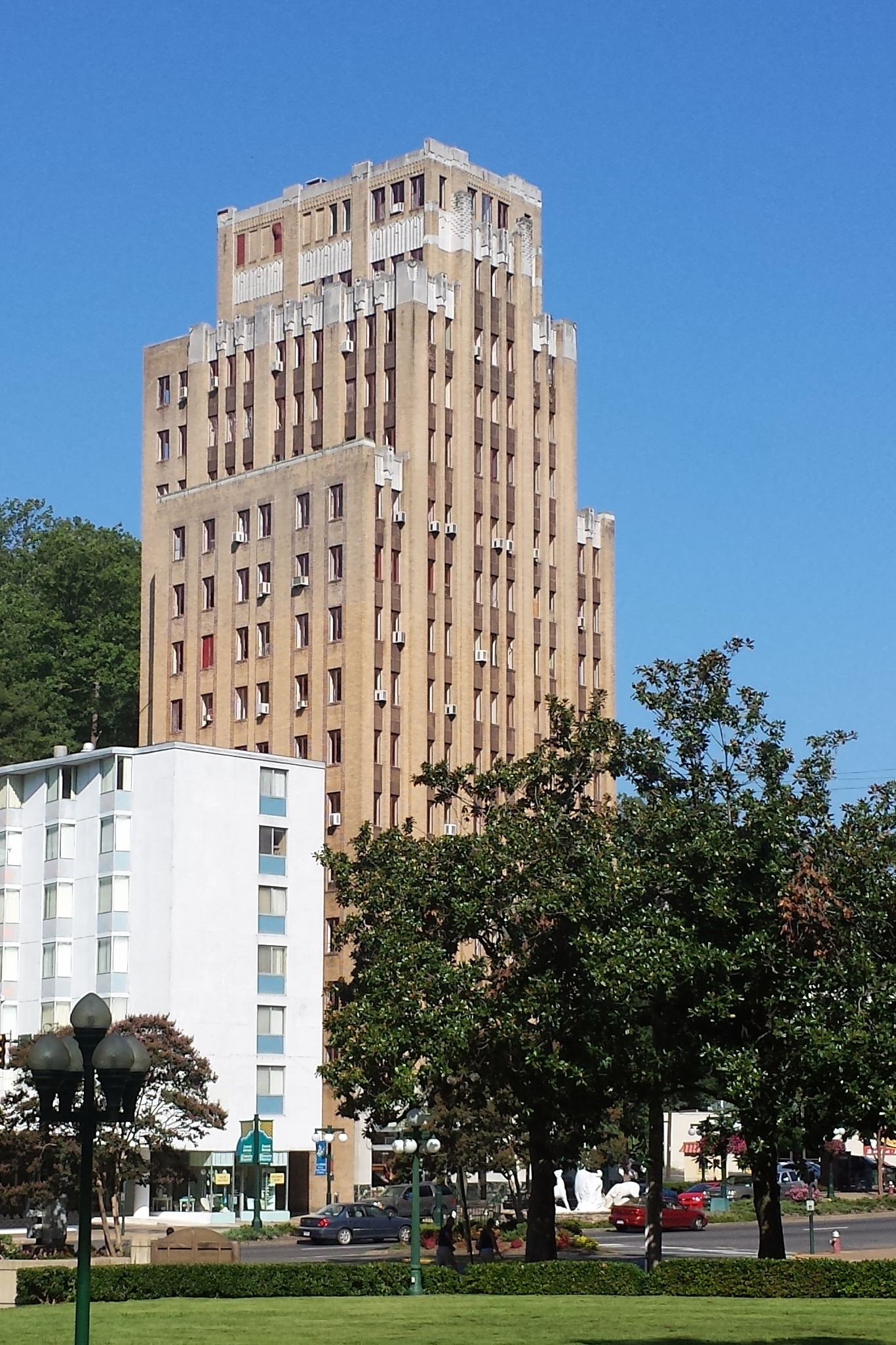
The Medical Arts Building towers over Central Avenue.

Along Bathhouse Row is Central Avenue, Highway 7, lined with historic buildings, businesses and tourist attractions. Today preserved by NRHP as Hot Springs Central Avenue Historic District, the district includes 77 contributing properties to the district between Prospect Street and Park Avenue. Included within this district are the 1924 Arlington Hotel, the Medical Arts Building, a 1929 Art Deco high-rise, and the Wade Building, built in 1927 in the neoclassical style.

==== Garvan Woodland Gardens ====
Founded by the daughter of a lumber and brick magnate in 1985, the 210-acre (85 ha) botanical garden on Arkridge Road features native Ouachita Mountains flora among rocky streams and waterfalls. Garvan also has a Japanese-themed section with several species native to Japan throughout. The garden is situated on a peninsula jutting into Lake Hamilton and began as Verna Garvan's personal garden for decades before being donated to the University of Arkansas landscape architecture department.

==== Historic hotels and districts ====
Thirteen of Hot Springs's hotels are individually listed by the NRHP within the city, with more being listed as contributing properties within other districts. Four of Hot Springs' neighborhoods are preserved as historic districts by the National Register of Historic Places, and the city also contains five historically important commercial districts in addition to the aforementioned Bathhouse Row and Central Avenue Historic District.

The city contains several historic hotels, including the Arlington Hotel, Jack Tar Hotel and Bathhouse, Mountainaire Hotel Historic District, Park Hotel, and the Riviera Hotel. During Hot Springs' heyday, several tourists visiting the city stayed at motor courts, the precursor to today's hotels. The NRHP recognizes seven of these motels as culturally and historically significant: Bellaire Court Historic District, Cottage Courts Historic District, Cove Tourist Court, George Klein Tourist Court Historic District, Lynwood Tourist Court Historic District, Parkway Courts Historic District, Perry Plaza Court Historic District, and the Taylor Rosamond Motel Historic District.

The Fordyce-Ricks House Historic District at 1501 Park Avenue includes three buildings on 37 acres (15 ha) formerly owned by Samuel W. Fordyce, a prominent businessman and railroad executive who moved to Hot Springs in 1876. The house and outbuildings are built as log cabins in the Adirondack style. The Pleasant Street Historic District along Malvern Avenue (colloquially "Black Broadway") contains 93 contiguous buildings associated with the city's African American community. Included within the district are the Visitors Chapel AME church and the Woodmen of Union Building, along with 69 other contributing structures. A variety of architectural styles are used, with many of the structures using brick facades. The Quapaw-Prospect Historic District contains 233 structures near downtown Hot Springs, with 139 residential houses contributing to the character of the district built between 1890 and 1950 in several architectural styles. The Whittington Park Historic District is a residential district lining Whittington Park, a long, narrow park between two one-way streets created by the National Park Service in 1897. The 1896–1960 district contains 60 single-family houses and ten other structures. Predominantly Craftsman, ranch and Queen Anne-style buildings, the district is northwest of downtown Hot Springs.

Seven districts in Hot Springs have special historical significance to the city's past economy. In addition to the aforementioned Bathhouse Row and Central Avenue Historic District, the Army and Navy General Hospital Historic District includes 31 buildings surrounding and supporting the former Army-Navy Hospital. Built in 1933, the six-story brick building, built in the Spanish Colonial Revival style with Art Deco detailing, is the centerpiece of the district, and remains the most imposing figure on the Hot Springs skyline. The Forest Service Headquarters Historic District encompasses six structures on Winona and Indiana Streets built by the Civilian Conservation Corps as the headquarters of the Jessieville Ranger District of the Ouachita National Forest. The Hot Springs Railroad Warehouse Historic District preserves three brick buildings between the Missouri Pacific Railroad tracks and Broadway. Almost entirely unaltered, the 1920s structures are associated with the railroad industry, which was extremely important to Hot Springs in the early 20th century. As the city grew during the early 20th century, commercial activity developed along Ouachita Avenue south of Bathhouse Row, today preserved as the Ouachita Avenue Historic District. Mostly consisting of brick commercial and multifamily buildings, the district maintains the character of a historic commercial area. The 1905 Peter Joplin Commercial Block building was the only building to survive the 1913 "Black Friday" fire, making it a remnant of early commercial activity on Ouachita Avenue when all contemporary structures had been destroyed.

==== Lake Catherine and Lake Hamilton ====
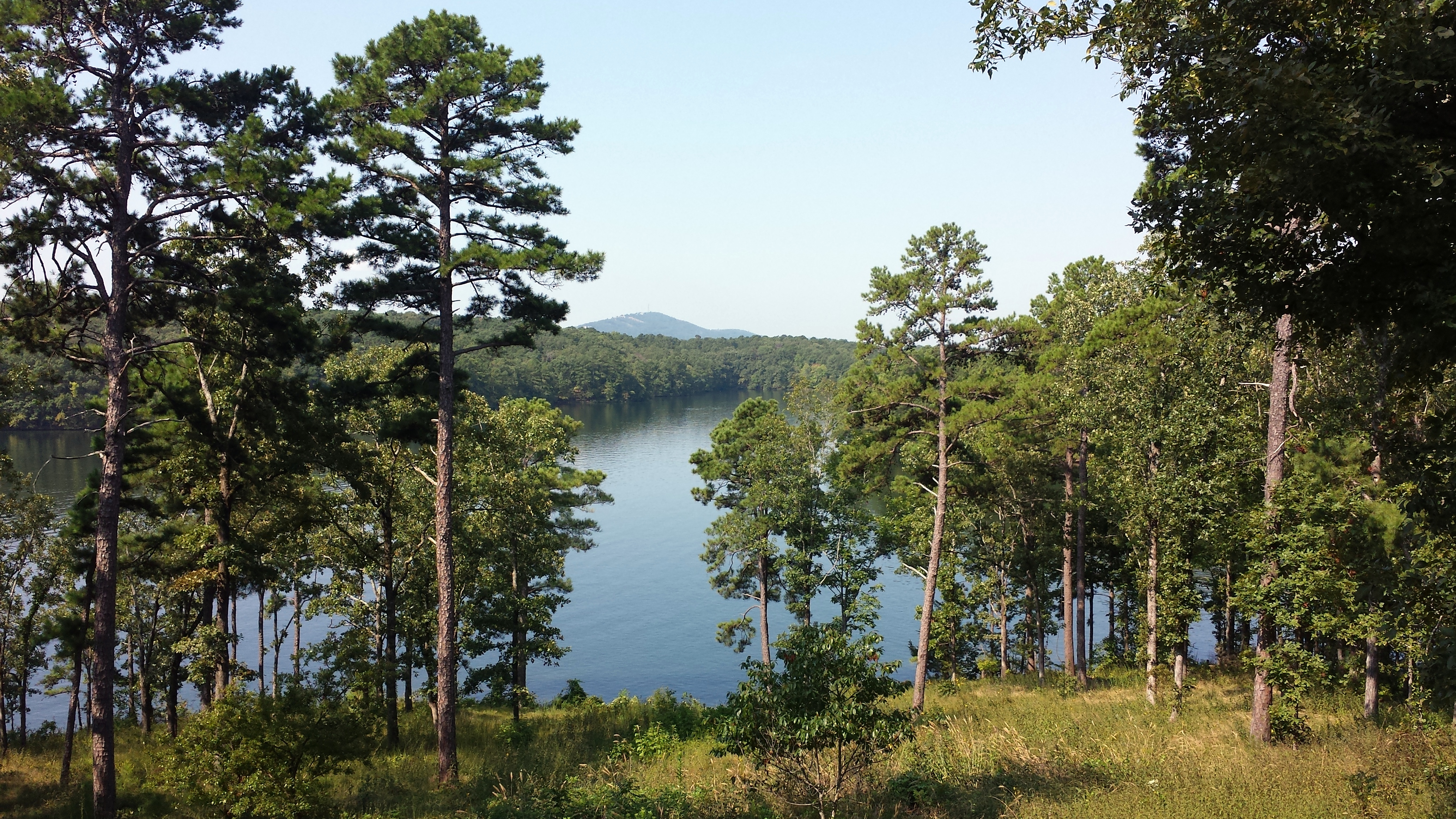
Lake Hamilton, viewed from Garvan Woodland Gardens

Lake Hamilton and Lake Catherine are two reservoirs of the Ouachita River south of Hot Springs, created for hydroelectric power generation and recreational uses. Both created by Arkansas Power & Light (AP&L), Lake Catherine formed following the construction of Remmel Dam in the 1920s. Following a donation of over 2,000 acres (810 ha), the state created Lake Catherine State Park in 1935. Today, the park features fishing and water recreation as well as camping for visitors. Lake Hamilton was created following the construction of Carpenter Dam in the 1930s. Built during the Great Depression, the power produced by the dam is credited with allowing AP&L to survive the difficult economic times. Following construction, resorts, businesses, and homes have been built along the lake, in contrast to Lake Catherine. Due to the economic importance of the dam to Hot Springs, Carpenter Dam was placed on the National Register of Historic Places in 1992. Fishing is popular on Lake Hamilton, and the Arkansas Game and Fish Commission operates a fish hatchery to stock the lake with bass and other species.

==== Oaklawn Park ====
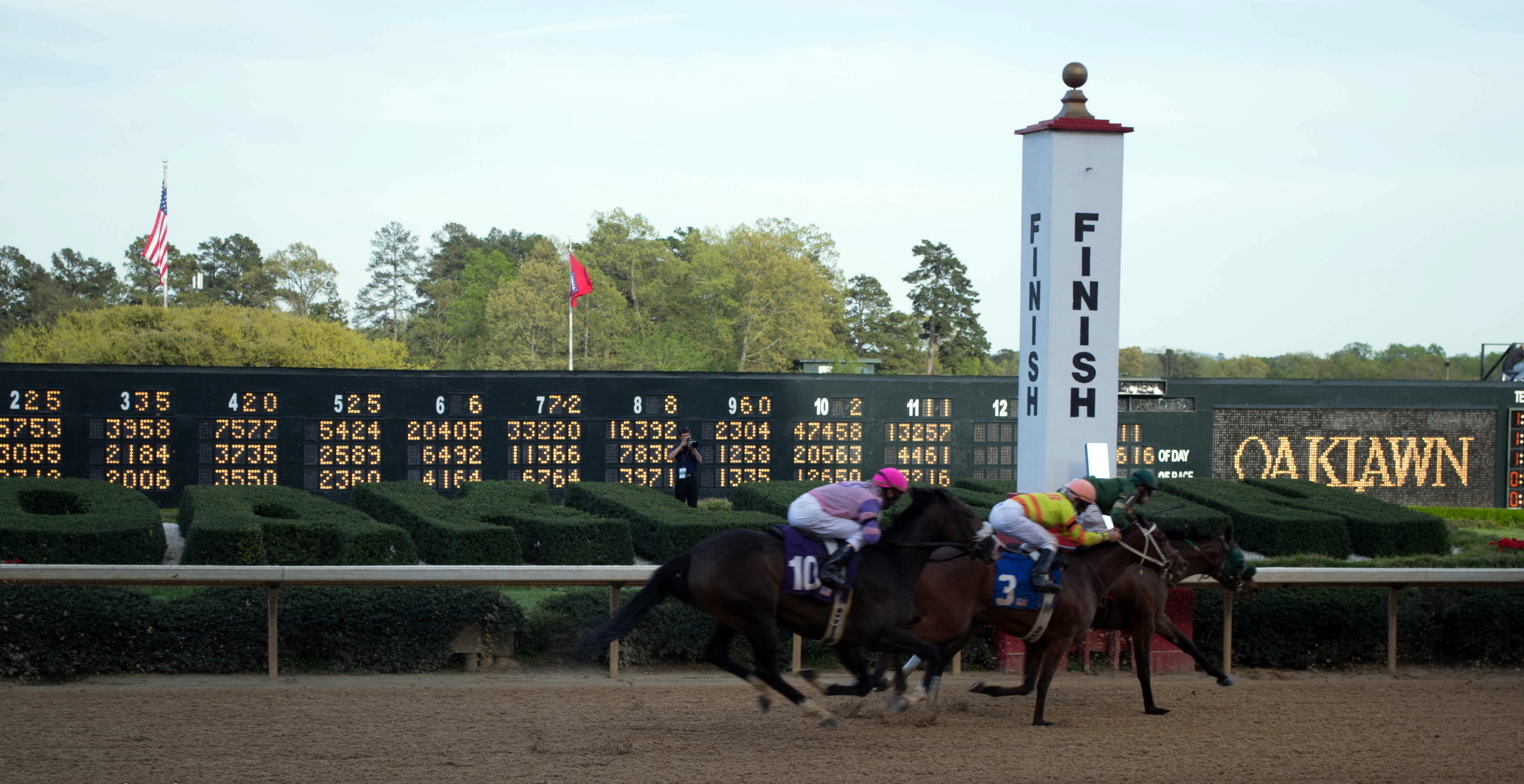
Finish line at the 2013 Arkansas Derby

Oaklawn Park has been operating since 1904. (A second horse racing park was once within the city limits, but was eventually closed.) Former U.S. President Bill Clinton, his half-brother Roger, and Billy Bob Thornton, all Hot Springs natives, have frequented Oaklawn Park. The meet, held from December through May each year, is sometimes called the "Fifth Season". In mid-April, its final week sees the "Racing Festival of the South", concluding with the Arkansas Derby, which has drawn many Triple Crown contenders. In 2015, American Pharoah won the Derby and another race at Oaklawn before going on to win the first Triple Crown in three decades. In 2018, the track commemorated the horse's victories by installing a life-sized bronze sculpture by James Peniston.

=== Sister city ===
- Hanamaki, Iwate, Japan (established in 1993)

=== Additional ===
- Low Key Arts

== Government ==
I.W. Carhart was the first mayor of Hot Springs.

Hot Springs operates under the council-manager form of city government, one of the two most common forms of local government in the United States, and common in smaller municipalities. The city is divided into six districts, which elect a city director to the seven-member board of directors. As a body, the board is the prime executive branch of the Hot Springs government whose duties include making policy, creating a budget, and passing resolutions and ordinances. The seventh member is a mayor elected at-large by Hot Springs. The mayor presides over city functions in an official capacity and manages the municipal government, without legislative authority. City director elections are held every four years, but are staggered such that elections for three districts coincide with the election of the President of the United States and four occur in November of "off years".

== Education ==
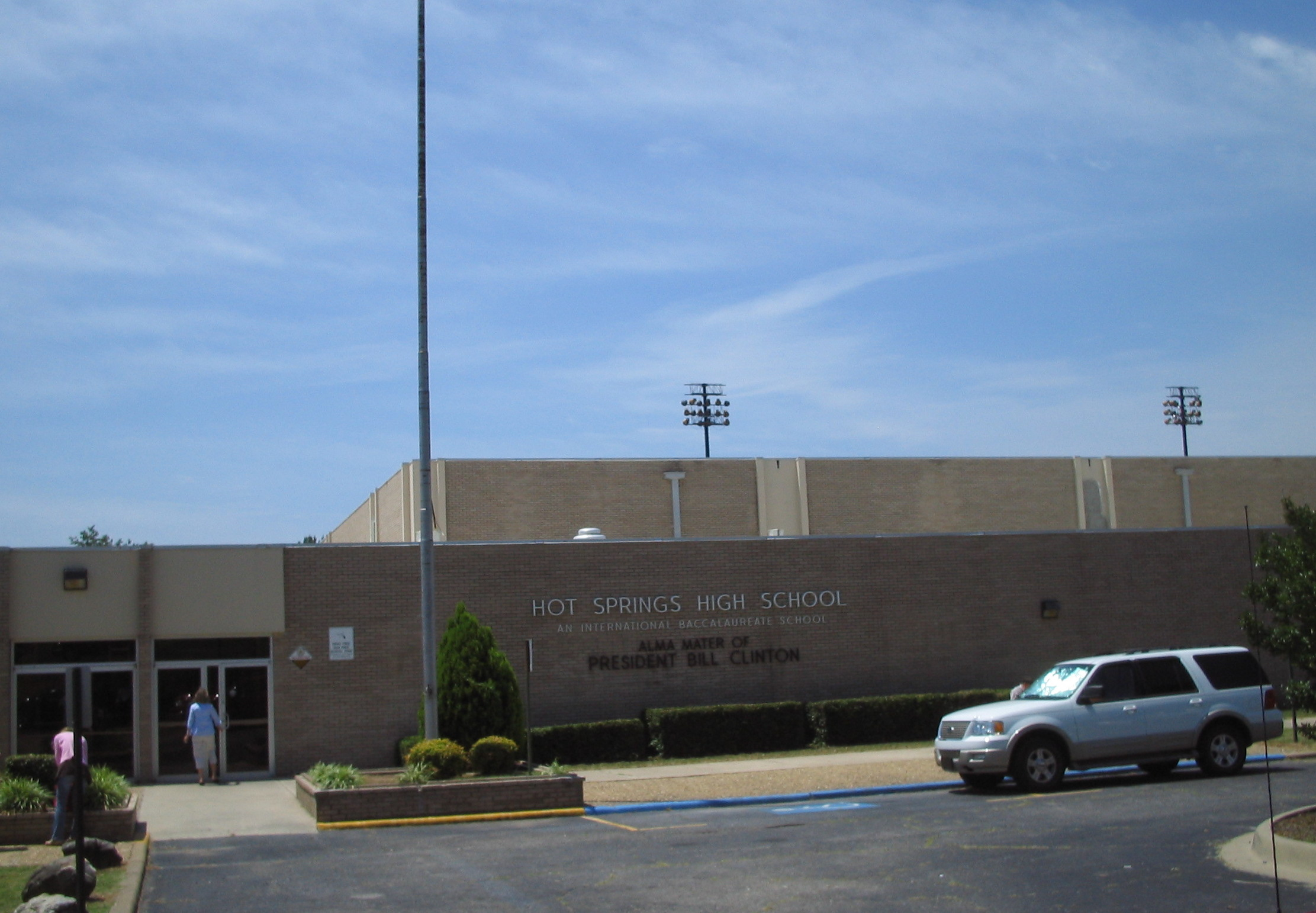
Hot Springs High School

The Hot Springs Special School District was created in 1881, and St. Mary's Academy was opened in 1882.

Hot Springs public primary and secondary education includes five school districts, ultimately leading to graduation from five different high schools. The vast majority of Hot Springs is included in the Hot Springs School District, which leads to graduation from Hot Springs High School. Sections of southeastern Hot Springs are within the Lakeside School District, leading to graduation from Lakeside High School, located southeast of town Some eastern sections of Hot Springs are in the Cutter–Morning Star School District, leading to graduation from Cutter–Morning Star High School. The a few pieces to the north are within the Fountain Lake School District, leading to graduation from Fountain Lake High School. In small pieces in the west, students are to be enrolled in Lake Hamilton School District, which leads to graduation from Lake Hamilton High School.

The Arkansas School for Mathematics, Sciences, and the Arts (ASMSA), an advanced statewide program within the University of Arkansas System and National Consortium for Specialized Secondary Schools of Mathematics, Science and Technology, is also located in Hot Springs. A two-year residential program, ASMSA was established in 1993 and is available to students from across the state following acceptance. Hot Springs Christian School is the only private provider of K–12 education in Hot Springs. The only accredited post-secondary educational opportunity in Hot Springs is at National Park College. Created from a merger between Garland County Community College and Quapaw Technical Institute, the college enrolls approximately 3,000 students annually in credit programs. Champion Baptist College, an unaccredited four-year Christian vocational college associated with Gospel Light Baptist Church, is also located in Hot Springs. Champion Baptist College was issued a Letter of Exemption from Certification by the Arkansas Department of Higher Education to offer church-related courses and grant church-related degrees.

Hot Springs previously had a Catholic grade school for black children, St. Gabriel School; it closed in 1968.

== Media ==
The Hot Springs newspaper is the Sentinel-Record, originally part of the Clyde E. Palmer chain, since renamed WEHCO Media. It is published daily.

The Thrifty Nickel, a classified advertising publication, is published from offices at 670 Ouachita Avenue. The Little Rock edition is also published from this office. Thrifty Nickel ceased publication in March 2020.

Seven AM radio stations and fifteen FM stations broadcast from the area.

In addition, most of the Little Rock radio stations provide at least secondary coverage of the city.

Hot Springs is part of the Little Rock television market.

== Transportation ==
U.S. Route 70 and U.S. Route 270 bypass the downtown to the south on the four-lane Dr. Martin Luther King Jr. Expressway. U.S. Route 70 Business passes through the center of Hot Springs as Grand Avenue, Summer Street, Albert Pike Road, and Airport Road, while U.S. Route 270 Business enters from the east as Malvern Avenue, joins US 70 Business along Grand Avenue and Summer Street, and exits to the west as Albert Pike Road. US-70 leads east 31 miles (50 km) to Benton and west-southwest 32 miles (51 km) to Glenwood, while US-270 leads southeast 20 miles (32 km) to Malvern and west-northwest 36 miles (58 km) to Mount Ida. Interstate 30 passes to the southeast of Hot Springs, with the closest access 17 miles (27 km) to the southeast via US-270. I-30 can also be reached 24 miles (39 km) to the east via US-70.

Arkansas Highway 7 passes through the center of Hot Springs as Central Avenue and Park Avenue. It leads north across the Ouachita Mountains 71 miles (114 km) to Russellville on the Arkansas River, and south 35 miles (56 km) to Arkadelphia. Arkansas Highway 128 (Carpenter Dam Road) branches off US-270 Business in southeastern Hot Springs, leading south 4 miles (6 km) to Red Oak.

Within Hot Springs, three fixed-route buses are operated by the city's Intracity Transit. Primary service includes the Central Avenue corridor (Route 1- blue line), Albert Pike corridor (Route 2 - red line), and Hot Springs National Park and the northeast part of the city (Route 3 - green line). All routes are based at the city's Transportation Depot in downtown Hot Springs, and operate six days a week; Sundays and six annual holidays are excluded.

Hot Springs is served by Memorial Field Airport. Major air transport is available through Little Rock National Airport, approximately 55 miles (89 km) from Hot Springs.

== Notable people ==
- Steve Barton, actor, singer, dancer, choreographer, stage director and teacher
- Bobby Bones, radio personality born in Hot Springs
- Ruth Coker Burks, AIDS activist, humanitarian, and caregiver
- Alan Clark, state senator from Garland, Hot Spring, Saline, and Grant counties, businessman in Hot Springs
- Bill Clinton, governor of Arkansas and 42nd president of the United States, boyhood home
- Roger Clinton Jr., musician, actor and half-brother of former US President Bill Clinton, born in Hot Springs on July 25, 1956
- Donald L. Corbin, Arkansas Supreme Court justice and state representative, born in Hot Springs
- Timothy C. Evans Chief Judge of the Cook County Circuit Court
- Gauge, pornographic actress born in Hot Springs
- Henry Glover, songwriter
- Cliff Harris, NFL Dallas Cowboys free safety, played quarterback at Hot Springs High School until his senior year, when he moved to Des Arc
- Flora Harrod Hawes, youngest female postmaster in Hot Springs
- V. E. Howard, Church of Christ minister who founded the International Gospel Hour in Texarkana, Texas; pastor in Hot Springs early in his career
- Alan Ladd, actor born in Hot Springs in 1913
- Marjorie Lawrence, Metropolitan Opera diva, resident for many years
- John Little, football player
- Annie Guinn Massey, President General of the United Daughters of the Confederacy
- Arch McDonald, baseball broadcaster born in Hot Springs
- Sid McMath, progressive reform governor of Arkansas 1949–1953, trial lawyer, and decorated U.S. Marine general
- Joan Meredith, actress born in Hot Springs
- Bobby Mitchell, NFL Hall of Fame running back born in Hot Springs
- Juanita Jackson Mitchell, born in Hot Springs, civil rights lawyer and activist
- James Rector, born in Hot Springs, won a silver medal at the Olympics and was the first Olympian from Arkansas
- Abraham B. Rhine (1877–1941), rabbi
- Earl T. Ricks and I. G. Brown, decorated World War II aviators, Hot Springs natives who served as reform mayor and sheriff, respectively (1947–49), before resuming Air Force careers
- Paul Runyan, golfer born in Hot Springs; went on to win two PGA championships and is a member of the World Golf Hall of Fame
- Laurie Rushing, Republican member of the Arkansas House of Representatives from District 26 since 2015; real estate broker
- Bill Sample, Republican member of both houses of the Arkansas General Assembly since 2005; businessman in Hot Springs
- George Luke Smith, served in the U.S. House from Louisiana's 4th congressional district, relocated to Hot Springs, where he engaged in the real estate business and died in 1884
- Katherine Stinson, aviatrix, fourth woman in the United States to obtain a pilot's certificate, moved in with family in Hot Springs directly after obtaining her certificate
- Billy Bob Thornton, actor, director and Academy Award-winning screenwriter, born in Hot Springs
- Bruce Westerman, U.S. representative
- Inez Harrington Whitfield, botanical watercolor artist active in Hot Springs 1901–1951

== See also ==
- National Register of Historic Places listings in Garland County, Arkansas
- Excelsior Springs, Missouri, a similar 19th-century town that grew up around mineral springs

== Works cited ==
- Allbritton, Orval (2003). Leo and Verne: The Spa's Heyday. Garland County Historical Society. ISBN 0929604873.
