= Hot Springs Railroad Warehouse Historic District =

Historic district in Arkansas, United States

- U.S. National Register of Historic Places
- U.S. Historic district
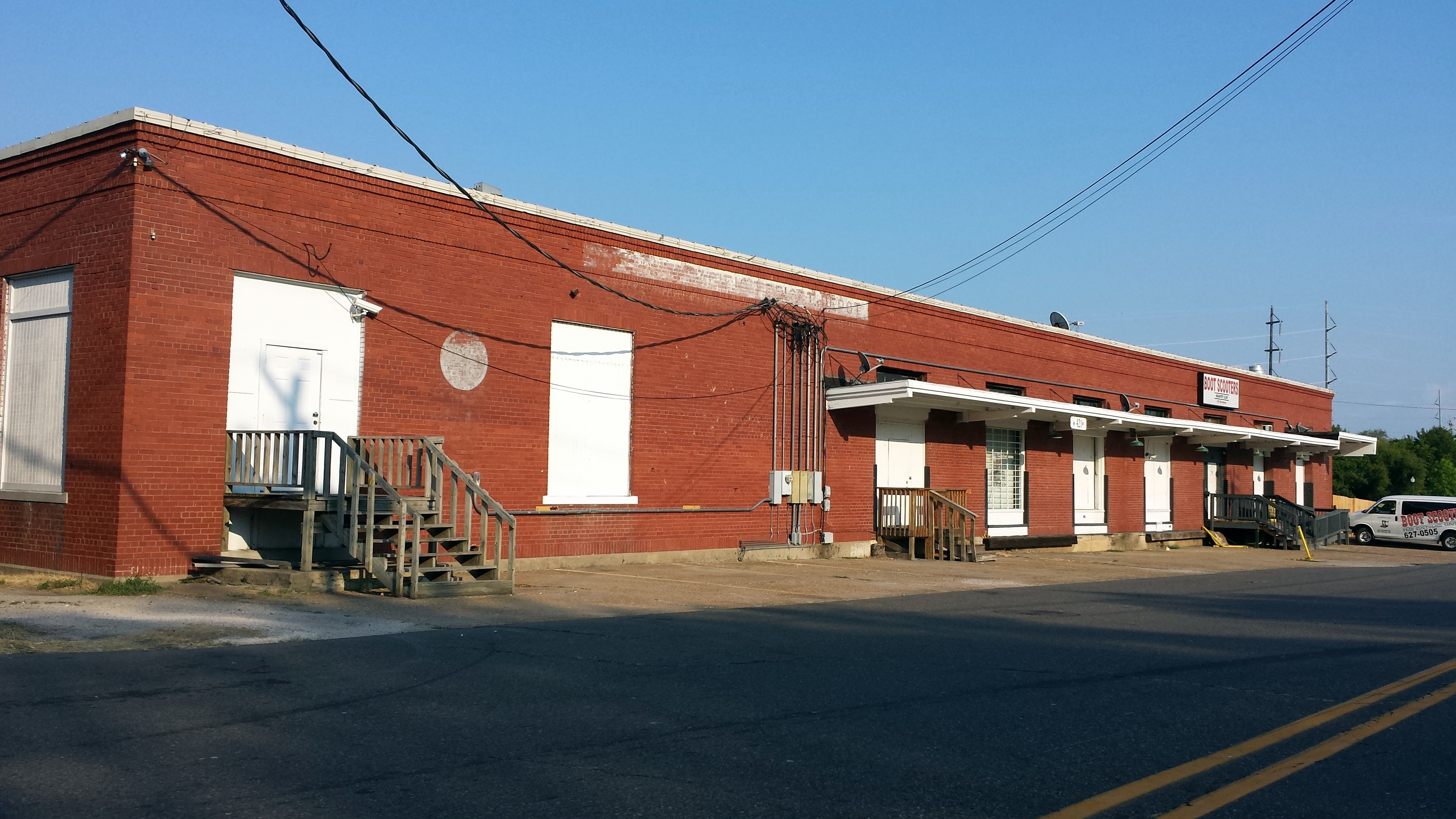

- Location within Arkansas Location within the United States
- Location: 401-439 Broadway, Hot Springs, Arkansas
- Coordinates: 34°30′17″N 93°3′5″W
- Area: 2 acres (0.81 ha)
- Built: 1900
- Architectural style: Early Commercial
- NRHP reference No.: 96000526
- Added to NRHP: May 27, 1996

The Hot Springs Railroad Warehouse Historic District encompasses three early 20th-century brick warehouses in Hot Springs, Arkansas, United States, which serve as a reminder of the importance of rail transport to the economic success of the resort community. Located at 401-439 Broadway are three single-story utilitarian brick buildings, constructed between 1900 and 1920. 421 Broadway, at the center was originally built by the Missouri Pacific Railroad in 1915 to serve as its main freight depot in Hot Springs.

The district was listed on the National Register of Historic Places in 1996.

== See also ==
- National Register of Historic Places listings in Garland County, Arkansas
