= Peter Joplin Commercial Block =

- U.S. National Register of Historic Places
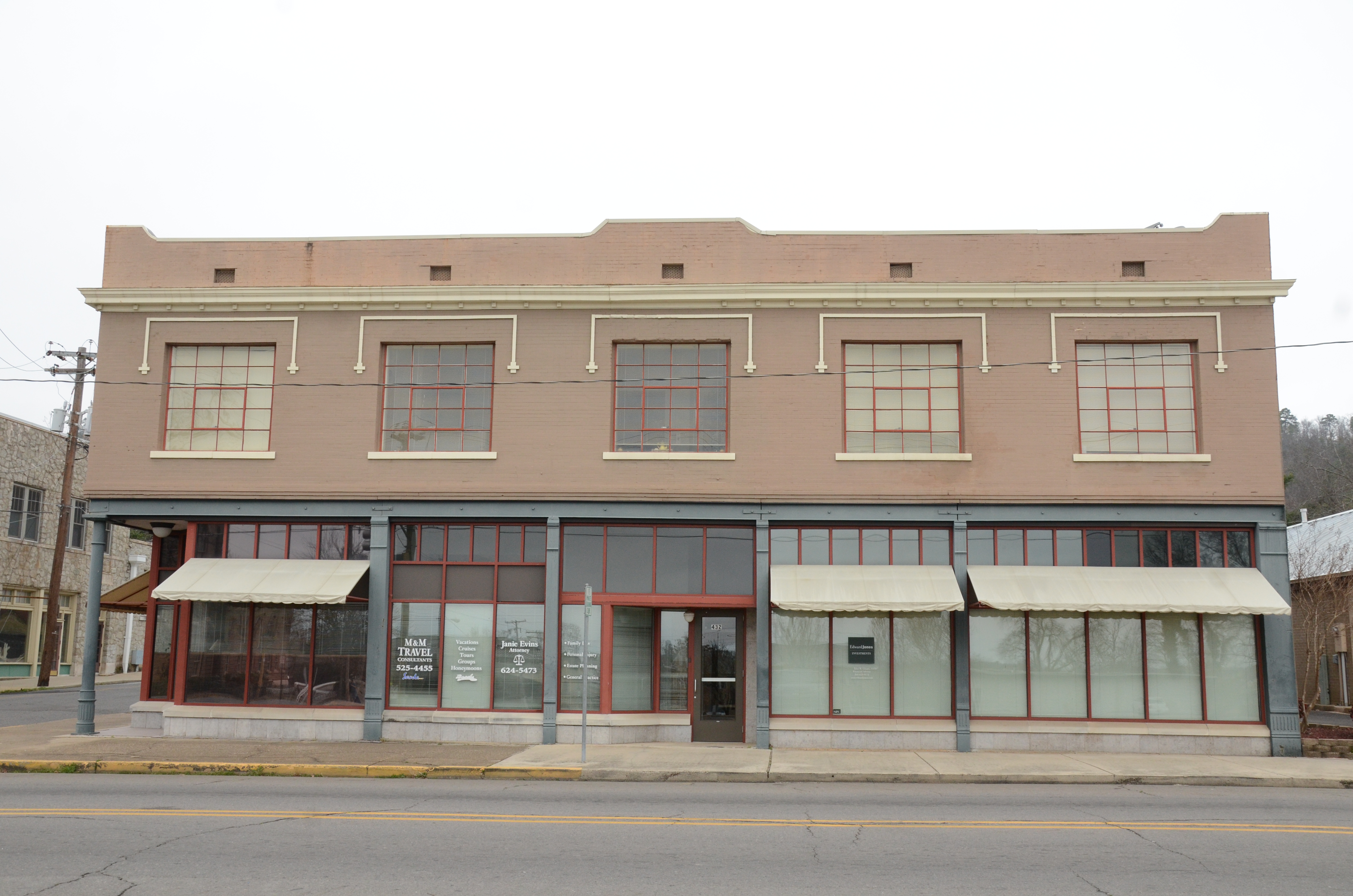

- Location within Arkansas Location within the United States
- Location: 426-432 Ouachita Ave., Hot Springs, Arkansas
- Coordinates: 34°30′24″N 93°3′30″W
- Area: 0.1 acres (0.040 ha)
- Built: 1913
- Architectural style: Early Commercial
- NRHP reference No.: 00000294
- Added to NRHP: March 31, 2000

The Peter Joplin Commercial Block is a historic commercial building at 426-443 Ouachita Street in Hot Springs, Arkansas. It is a two-story masonry structure, with retail storefronts on the ground floor and offices above. It is architecturally undistinguished, with nods toward the Tudor Revival in its styling. Built in 1905, after a fire had swept through the area, it is one of the only buildings in the area to survive an even larger fire in 1913. As such, it is a rare surviving example of early 20th century commercial architecture.

The building was listed on the National Register of Historic Places in 2000.

== See also ==
- National Register of Historic Places listings in Garland County, Arkansas
