= Ouachita Avenue Historic District =

Historic district in Arkansas, United States

- U.S. National Register of Historic Places
- U.S. Historic district
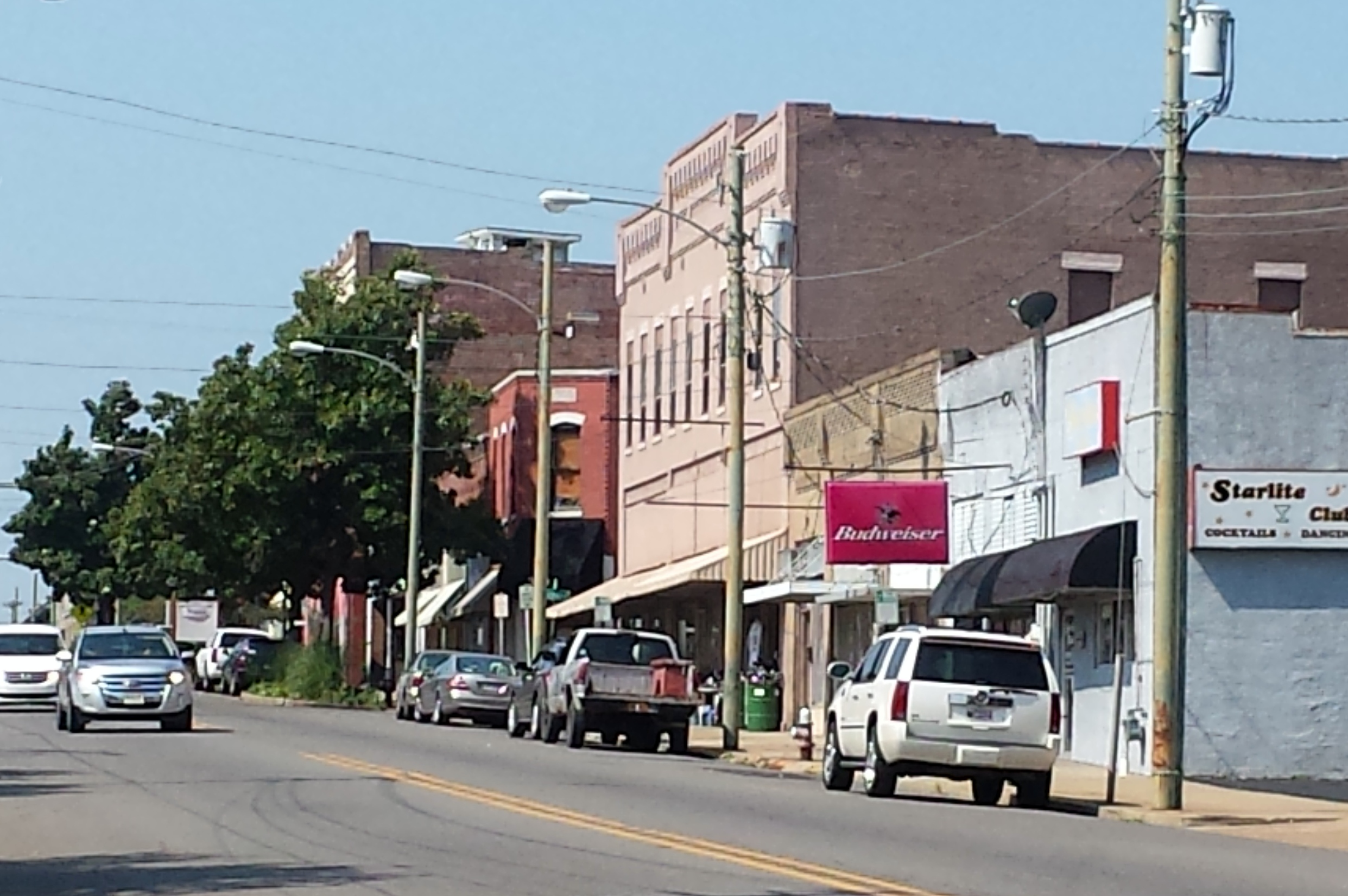

- Location within Arkansas Location within the United States
- Location: Bounded by Ouachita Ave., Orange St., Central Ave. & Olive St., Hot Springs, Arkansas
- Coordinates: 34°30′23″N 93°3′21″W
- Area: 9 acres (3.6 ha)
- Built: 1905
- NRHP reference No.: 11000690
- Added to NRHP: September 23, 2011

The Ouachita Avenue Historic District encompasses a commercial and residential district south of Bathhouse Row in downtown Hot Springs, Arkansas. It includes an area of three square blocks bounded by Ouachita Avenue, Orange and Olive Streets, and Central Avenue. This area was completely devastated by a fire in 1905, and damaged by another in 1913, and it is after these events that its most significant buildings were built. It contains a variety of commercial buildings (mostly on Ouachita Avenue, multiunit and single-family housing, in a dense pedestrian-friendly urban setting.

The district was listed on the National Register of Historic Places in 2011.

== See also ==
- National Register of Historic Places listings in Garland County, Arkansas
