= Mountainaire Hotel Historic District =

Historic district in Arkansas, United States

- U.S. National Register of Historic Places
- U.S. Historic district
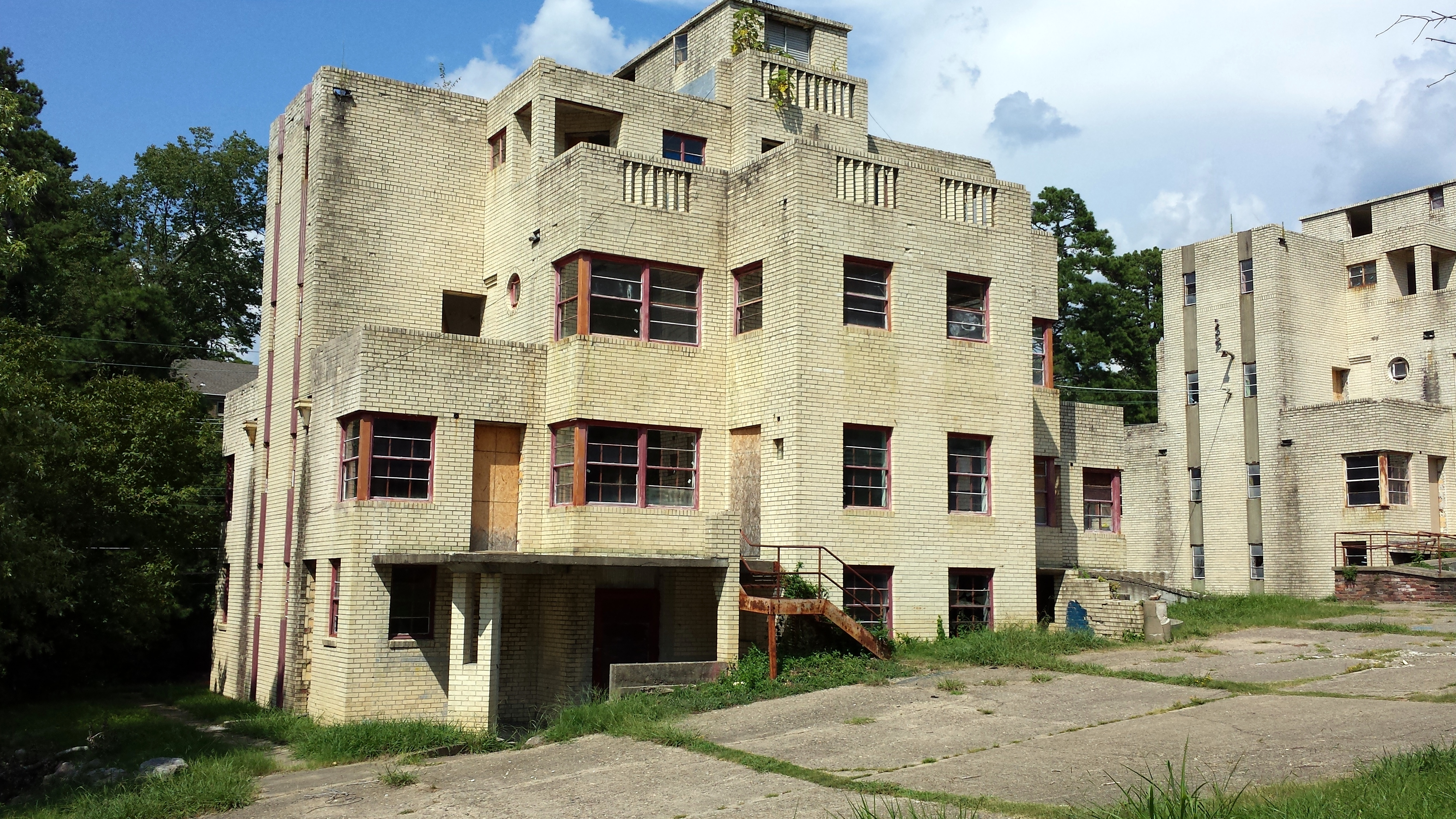

- Location within Arkansas Location within the United States
- Location: 1100 Park Ave., Hot Springs, Arkansas
- Coordinates: 34°31′50″N 93°2′32″W
- Area: less than one acre
- Built: 1947
- Architect: A.I. Albinson
- Architectural style: Moderne
- MPS: Arkansas Highway History and Architecture MPS
- NRHP reference No.: 04000013
- Added to NRHP: February 11, 2004

The Mountainaire Hotel Historic District encompasses a pair of former hotel buildings at 1100 Park Avenue in Hot Springs, Arkansas. They are virtually identical four story masonry structures, clad in a buff brick veneer, with stepped facades in an Art Moderne style. They were built about 1947, as part of a planned five-building complex, and are one a small number of Art Moderne buildings in the city. They were built by A.I. Albinson, originally from Minnesota, and operated as a hotel for about twenty years. They were thereafter converted to an elderly care facility. At the time they were listed on the National Register of Historic Places in 2004, the buildings stood vacant.

== See also ==
- National Register of Historic Places listings in Garland County, Arkansas
