= Low Key Arts =

Company

Low Key Arts is an arts nonprofit organization located in Hot Springs, Arkansas. Low Key Arts occupied 118 Arbor Street, from 2005 until the property was sold by its owners in June 2020. Subsequently, Low Key Arts' board of directors voted for the organization to go virtual until such a time when covid-19 no longer poses a public health risk.

Low Key Arts is a 501c3 non profit public charity. With the support of sponsors and volunteers, Low Key Arts has been producing concerts, filmmaking workshops, music and arts festivals, and community events in the historic town of Hot Springs National Park, Arkansas since 2005. Beginning in November 2017, the executive director of the organization is Sonny Kay. Low Key Arts was founded by Bill Solleder and Shea Childs.

Low Key Arts produces six major programs: Valley of the Vapors Independent Music Festival (VOV) which takes place every March; Hot Water Hills which takes place every October; Arkansas Shorts a Night of Short Film which takes place every January; Inception to Projection Filmmaking Workshop taking place each summer and periodically at other times; KUHS-LP 102.5 FM/kuhsradio.org solar-powered community radio; and Low Key Labs Creativity Workshops, which take place online throughout the year.
