= Riviera Hotel (Hot Springs, Arkansas) =

- U.S. National Register of Historic Places
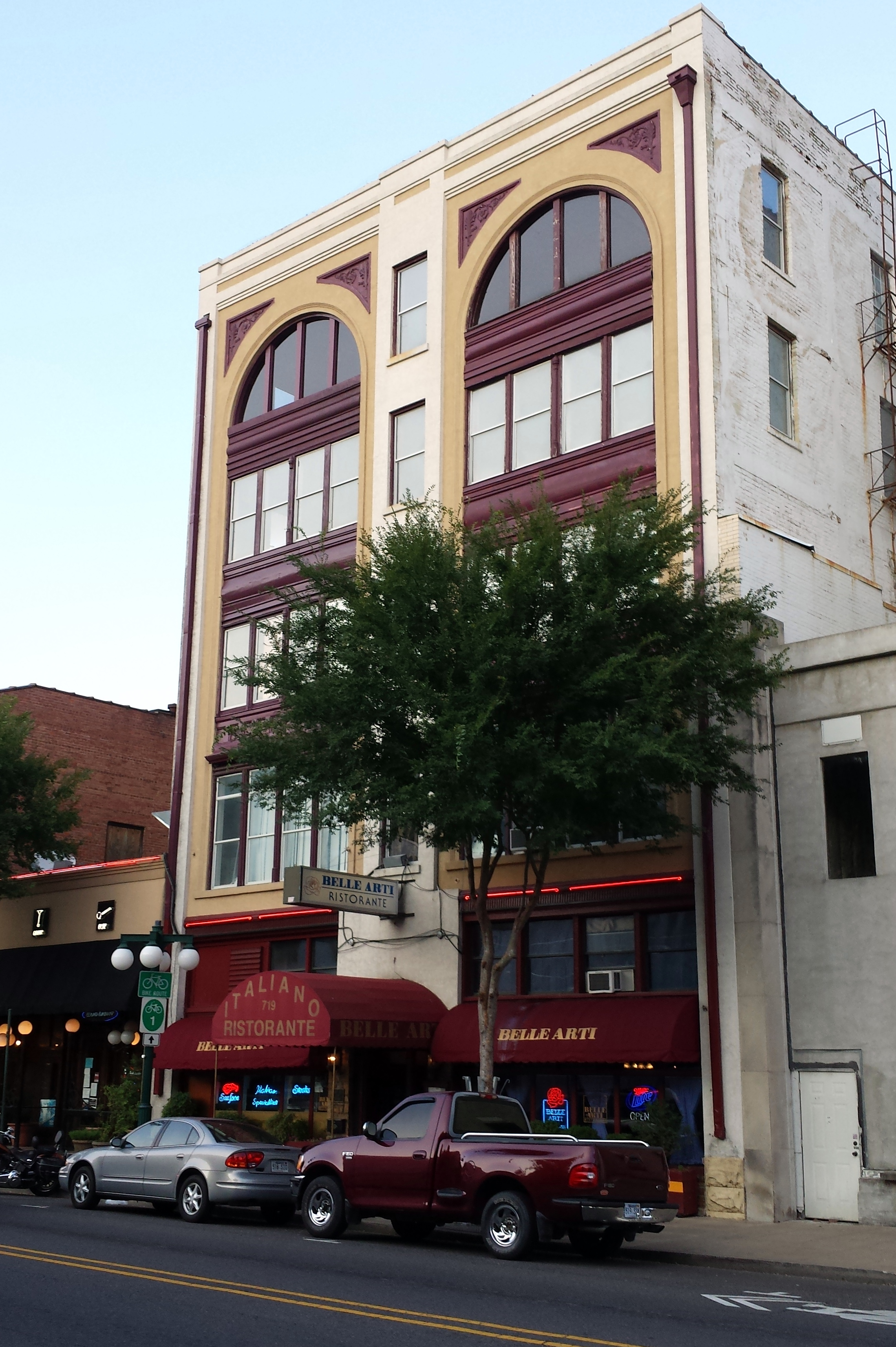

- Location within Arkansas Location within the United States
- Location: 719 Central, Hot Springs, Arkansas
- Coordinates: 34°30′32″N 93°3′15″W
- Area: less than one acre
- Built: 1930
- Architect: Charles L. Thompson (Thompson, Sanders & Ginocchio)
- Architectural style: Chicago school
- MPS: Thompson, Charles L., Design Collection TR
- NRHP reference No.: 82000820
- Added to NRHP: December 22, 1982

The Riviera Hotel is a historic hotel building at 719 Central Avenue in Hot Springs, Arkansas. It is a five-story brick-faced structure, its main facade divided into two sections flanking a central panel. The outer sections are each topped by a rounded arch with carved foliate panels in the corner sections outside the arch. Bands of windows are separated by horizontal panels at the lower levels, and it has a commercial storefront on the ground floor. The building was designed by Charles L. Thompson and built about 1930. It is a locally significant architectural work reminiscent of the Chicago school.

The building was listed on the National Register of Historic Places in 1982.

== See also ==
- National Register of Historic Places listings in Garland County, Arkansas
