= Martin House =

Martin House or Martin Farm or variations may refer to:

== England ==
- Martin House Hospice, a children's hospice in Wetherby

== United States ==
- James Martin House (Florence, Alabama)
- William H. Martin House, Hot Springs, Arkansas
- Owen Martin House, Marcella, Arkansas
- William P. and Rosa Lee Martin Farm, Marshall, Arkansas
- Dr. John Wilson Martin House, Warren, Arkansas
- Martin/Ling House, Prescott, Arizona, listed on the NRHP in Prescott, Arizona
- Samuel Martin House, Suisun, California, listed on the NRHP in Solano County
- Caleb Martin House, Bethlehem, Connecticut
- Gov. John W. Martin House, Tallahassee, Florida
- William C. Martin House, Dalton, Georgia, listed on the NRHP in Whitfield County, Georgia
- Ritch–Carter–Martin House, Odum, Georgia
- Martin House (Fulton, Illinois)
- Sarah Martin House, Monmouth, Illinois
- Pierre Martin House, North Dupo, Illinois
- S. F. Martin House, Atlantic, Iowa
- Dr. G.S. Martin House, Maquoketa, Iowa
- Abner Martin House, Mount Zion, Iowa
- Benjamin Martin House, Finney, Kentucky
- Martin House (Greenville, Kentucky)
- Martin House (Hootentown, Kentucky), listed on the NRHP in Clark County
- James G. Martin House, Nicholasville, Kentucky, listed on the NRHP in Jessamine County
- Lewis Y. Martin House, Nicholasville, Kentucky, listed on the NRHP in Jessamine County
- Maj. John Martin House, Pine Grove, Kentucky, listed on the NRHP in Clark County
- Martin House (Shelbyville, Kentucky), listed on the NRHP in Shelby County
- Martin House (Columbia, Louisiana), listed on the NRHP in Caldwell Parish
- Sidney Martin House, Lafayette, Louisiana
- Ed Martin Seafood Company Factory and House, Westwego, Louisiana, listed on the NRHP in Jefferson Parish
- James Martin House (Snow Hill, Maryland)
- Martin House and Farm, North Swansea, Massachusetts
- Martin Farm (Rehoboth, Massachusetts)
- Martin House and Farm, North Swansea, Massachusetts
- Martin House (Seekonk, Massachusetts)
- Aaron Martin House, Waltham, Massachusetts
- Aaron Martin Houses, Waltham, Massachusetts
- Wiliam Martin House, Dundas, Minnesota, listed on the NRHP in Rice County, Minnesota
- Charles J. Martin House, Minneapolis, Minnesota
- Micajah Martin House, Dublin, New Hampshire, also called Micajah Martin Farm
- Martin Homestead, North Stratford, New Hampshire
- Martin House Complex, Frank Lloyd Wright-designed home in Buffalo, New York, also known as Darwin D. Martin House
- Martin Farm Complex, Lima, New York
- Hendrick Martin House, Red Hook, New York
- Harden Thomas Martin House, Greensboro, North Carolina
- Brooke and Anna E. Martin House, Canton, Ohio
- Martin House (Cincinnati, Ohio)
- Martin Farmstead, Washington, Pennsylvania
- Martin House (Wartrace, Tennessee)
- Henry Martin Farm, Ripley, Ohio
- George W. and Hannah Martin – John B. and Minnie Hosford House, Portland, Oregon, listed on the NRHP in Northeast Portland
- Martin-Little House, Phoenixville, Pennsylvania
- William Martin House (Brentwood, Tennessee)
- Richard E. Martin House, Forest Hills, Tennessee
- Dr. Richard and Mrs. Margaret Martin House, Nashville, Tennessee
- Warner Martin House, Rockford, Tennessee, listed on the NRHP in Blount County
- Martin-Miller Farm, Rowland Station, Tennessee, listed on the NRHP in Warren County
- James Martin House (Walland, Tennessee), listed on the NRHP in Blount County
- Martin-Lowe House, Clarendon, Texas, listed on the NRHP in Donley County
- Vera Martin-Fiek-Thumford House, Victoria, Texas, listed on the NRHP in Victoria County
- Manfred and Ethel Martin House, Vernal, Utah

== See also ==
- James Martin House (disambiguation)
- William Martin House (disambiguation)
- Martin Hall (disambiguation)
- Martin Building (disambiguation)
- Martin Hotel (disambiguation)
