= James Martin =

James, Jim, or Jimmy Martin may refer to:

== Academics ==
- James Cullen Martin (1928–1999), American chemist
- James E. Martin (1932–2017), president of the University of Arkansas and Auburn University
- James Kirby Martin (1943–2024), American historian
- James R. Martin II (c. 1826–1895), chancellor of North Carolina A&T State University

== Actors, musicians, and other performers ==
- Jimmy Martin (1927–2005), American bluegrass musician
- James Martin (Irish actor), Northern Irish actor from Oscar winning An Irish Goodbye
- James Martin (Scottish actor) (1931–2025), Scottish actor on Still Game
- James R. Martin (born 1951), American producer and director of documentaries Wrapped In Steel and Fired-up!
- Jim Martin (musician) (born 1961), American guitarist formerly with Faith No More
- Jim Martin (puppeteer) (born 1960), American puppeteer on Sesame Street
- James and Tom Martin (born 1977), English twin musicians
- Charra Tea, Northern Irish drag queen born James Martin

== Judges and lawyers ==
- James Martin (attorney), U.S. attorney in Missouri
- James Martin (premier) (1820–1886), solicitor, three times Premier of the colony of New South Wales, then Chief Justice of NSW for 13 years
- James Loren Martin (1846–1915), U.S. federal judge
- James Robert Martin Jr. (1909–1984), U.S. federal judge

== Military figures ==
- James Green Martin (1819–1878), Civil War Confederate brigadier general
- James Martin II (1826–1918), American Medal of Honor recipient
- James Fitzgerald Martin (1876–1958), officer of the British Army
- Jim Martin (Australian soldier) (1901–1915), youngest Anzac to serve at Gallipoli
- James Stewart Martin (author), United States Department of Justice official in Germany after World War II
- James Martin (British Army officer) (born 1973)

== Politicians ==
=== Australian politicians ===
- Sir James Martin (premier) (1820–1886), three times Premier of the colony of New South Wales, then Chief Justice of NSW for 13 years
- James Martin (South Australian politician) (1821–1899), engineer and politician of Gawler, South Australia
- James Martin (New South Wales politician, born 1850) (1850–1898), member of the New South Wales Legislative Assembly for South Sydney and Sydney-Bligh
- James Martin (Queensland politician) (born 1981), Queensland politician (elected 2021)

=== Canadian politicians ===
- James Morris Martin (1845–1902), Canadian politician

=== Irish politicians ===
- James Martin (Irish politician) (1905–1969), Fianna Fáil Senator from 1965 to 1969

=== United Kingdom politicians ===
- James Martin (1738–1810), British banker and politician who sat in the House of Commons for 31 years from 1776 to 1807
- James Martin (1807–1878), British Liberal Party politician and banker
- James Martin (trade unionist) (1850–1933), British trade unionist and politician

=== United States politicians ===
- James Stewart Martin (congressman) (1826–1907), U.S. representative from Illinois
- Jimmy Martin (politician) (1938–2019), American politician from Alabama
- James D. Martin (1918–2017), U.S. Representative from Alabama
- Jimmy Leawood Martin (born 1934), American politician in South Carolina
- James G. Martin (born 1935), North Carolina governor
- Jim Martin (Georgia politician) (born 1945), member of the Georgia House of Representatives
- James Martin (Maine politician) (born 1965), member of the Maine House of Representatives
- James Martin (mayor), Republican mayor of Ansonia, Connecticut, 1969–1971
- James Martin (South Carolina politician) (died 1868), member of the South Carolina House of Representatives

== Clergy ==
- James S. Martin (evangelical minister) (fl. 1913–1914), American anti-Mormon preacher
- James J. Martin (priest) (born 1960), American Jesuit priest and writer
- James A. Martin (1902–2007), American Jesuit priest

== Sportspeople ==
- James Martin (Australian cricketer) (1851–1930), Australian cricketer
- James Martin (Scottish cricketer) (1901–1988), Scottish cricketer and administrator
- Jim Martin (Australian footballer) (1884–1940), Australian rules player at multiple clubs
- James Martin (footballer, born 1893) (1893–1940), Scottish footballer
- James Martin (footballer, born 1898) (1898–1969), English footballer
- Jimmy Martin (golfer) (1924–2000), Irish golfer
- Jim Martin (American football) (1924–2002), College Football Hall of Fame member
- James Martin (American football) (1944–2009), American football and baseball coach, college athletics administrator
- Jimmy Martin (American football) (born 1982), National Football League guard
- James Martin (footballer, born 1994), Scottish footballer
- James Martin (footballer, born 1998), English footballer
- James Martin (rugby union) (born 1999), English rugby union player
- Jimmy Martin (judoka), American judoka

== Writers ==
- James Martin (philosopher) (fl. 1577), Scottish writer
- James Martin (convict) (c. 1760–?), convict transported to New South Wales, author of the only extant First Fleet convict account of life in the colony
- James J. Martin (historian) (1916–2004), American historian
- James Martin (author) (1933–2013), computer systems design author, writer
- James Conroyd Martin (fl. 2006–2016), historical fiction writer

== Other ==
- James Ranald Martin (1796–1874), surgeon in India
- Sir James Martin (engineer) (1893–1981), inventor of the modern aircraft ejection seat
- James Slattin Martin Jr. (1920–2002), project manager for the Viking program
- James Martin (chef) (born 1972), British celebrity chef
- James Martin (photographer), American photojournalist
- James Purdon Martin (1893–1984), British neurologist
- Jim Martin (ombudsman), Scottish public servant
- Spider Martin (1939–2003), American photographer
- James Martin & Co, Australian engineering firm
- James Henry Martin (1835–1909), British shipowner and entrepreneur
- James David Martin (born 1971), American serial killer

== See also ==
- James Marten (born 1984), American football player
- James Edgar Martine (1850–1925), U.S. Senator from New Jersey
- Jamie Martin (disambiguation)
- James Martin House (disambiguation)
- James S. Martin (disambiguation)
- Martin High School (Arlington, Texas), also known as James Martin High School
