= James S. Martin =

James S. Martin may refer to:

- James Stewart Martin (congressman) (1826–1907), U.S. Representative from Illinois
- James Stewart Martin (author) (1911–1987), American attorney and author
- James S. Martin (evangelical minister), anti-Mormon preacher
- James Slattin Martin Jr. (1920–2002), project manager for the Viking program

== See also ==
- James Martin (disambiguation)
