= James Martin House =

James Martin House may refer to:

- James Martin House (Florence, Alabama), listed on the National Register of Historic Places (NRHP) in Lauderdale County
- James G. Martin House, Nicholasville, Kentucky, listed on the NRHP in Jessamine County
- James Martin House (Snow Hill, Maryland), listed on the NRHP
- James Martin House (Walland, Tennessee), listed on the NRHP in Blount County

== See also ==
- Martin House (disambiguation)
- James Martin (disambiguation)
