= William Martin House =

William Martin House may refer to:

- William H. Martin House, Hot Springs, Arkansas, listed on the National Register of Historic Places (NRHP)
- William C. Martin House, Dalton, Georgia, listed on the NRHP in Whitfield County
- William Martin House (Dundas, Minnesota), listed on the NRHP in Rice County. Misspelled in NRHP database as Wiliam Martin House.
- William Martin House (Brentwood, Tennessee), listed on the NRHP in Williamson County

== See also ==
- Martin House (disambiguation)
