= James Robbe Jr. House =

Historic house in New Hampshire, United States

- U.S. National Register of Historic Places
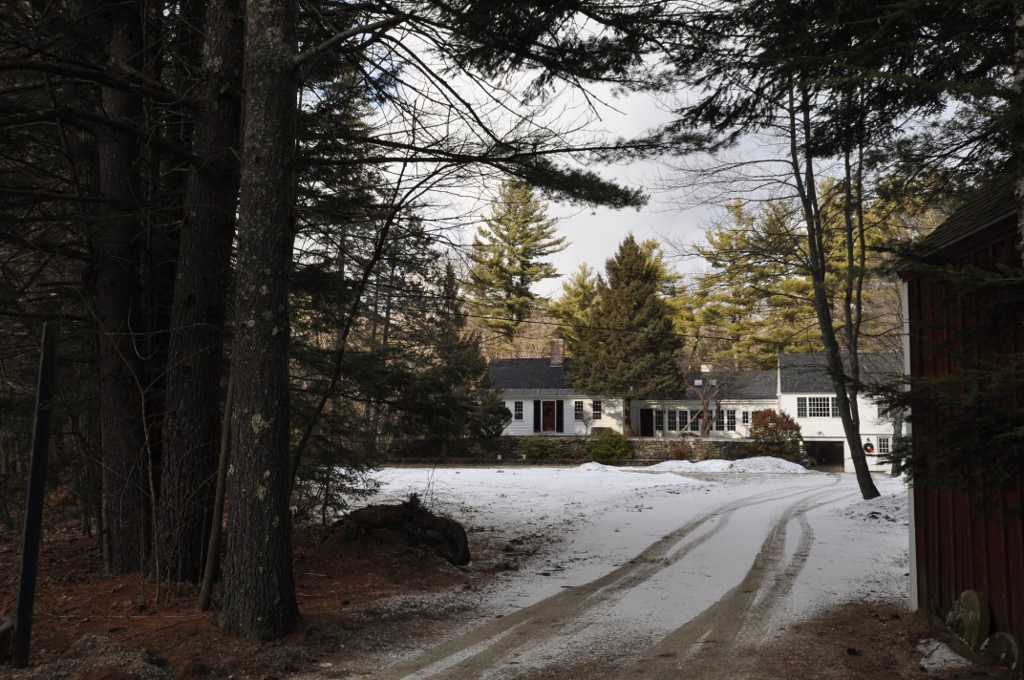

- Location within New Hampshire Location within the United States
- Location: Old Peterborough Rd., Dublin, New Hampshire
- Coordinates: 42°53′29″N 72°0′1″W
- Area: 1.6 acres (0.65 ha)
- Built: 1825
- Architectural style: Cape Colonial
- MPS: Dublin MRA
- NRHP reference No.: 83004074
- Added to NRHP: December 18, 1983

The James Robbe Jr. House is a historic house on Old Peterborough Road in Dublin, New Hampshire, United States. Built about 1825, it is a well-preserved example of a typical early Cape-style farmstead. The house was listed on the National Register of Historic Places in 1983.

== Description and history ==
The James Robbe Jr. House stands in a rural setting in eastern Dublin, on the north side of Old Peterborough Road near its junction with Goldmine Road. It is a 1 1/2-story wood frame Cape-style structure, with a gabled roof, central chimney, and clapboarded exterior. Its main facade is five bays wide, with sash windows symmetrically arranged around the center entrance. A long and narrow single-story ell connects the main block to a second block, which has living quarters above a basement-level garage.

The house was built about 1825 by James Robbe Jr., whose father was an early settler of nearby Peterborough, and whose house foundation stands nearby. The main block of the house is a typical Dublin farmhouse of the period, similar in style to the nearby Micajah Martin Farm. It was built about the time of Robbe's marriage to Mary Powers, the daughter of a neighboring farmer. The property has had a variety of owners since it was sold by Robbe's widow in 1840.

== See also ==
- National Register of Historic Places listings in Cheshire County, New Hampshire
