= Quapaw–Prospect Historic District =

Historic district in Arkansas, United States

- U.S. National Register of Historic Places
- U.S. Historic district
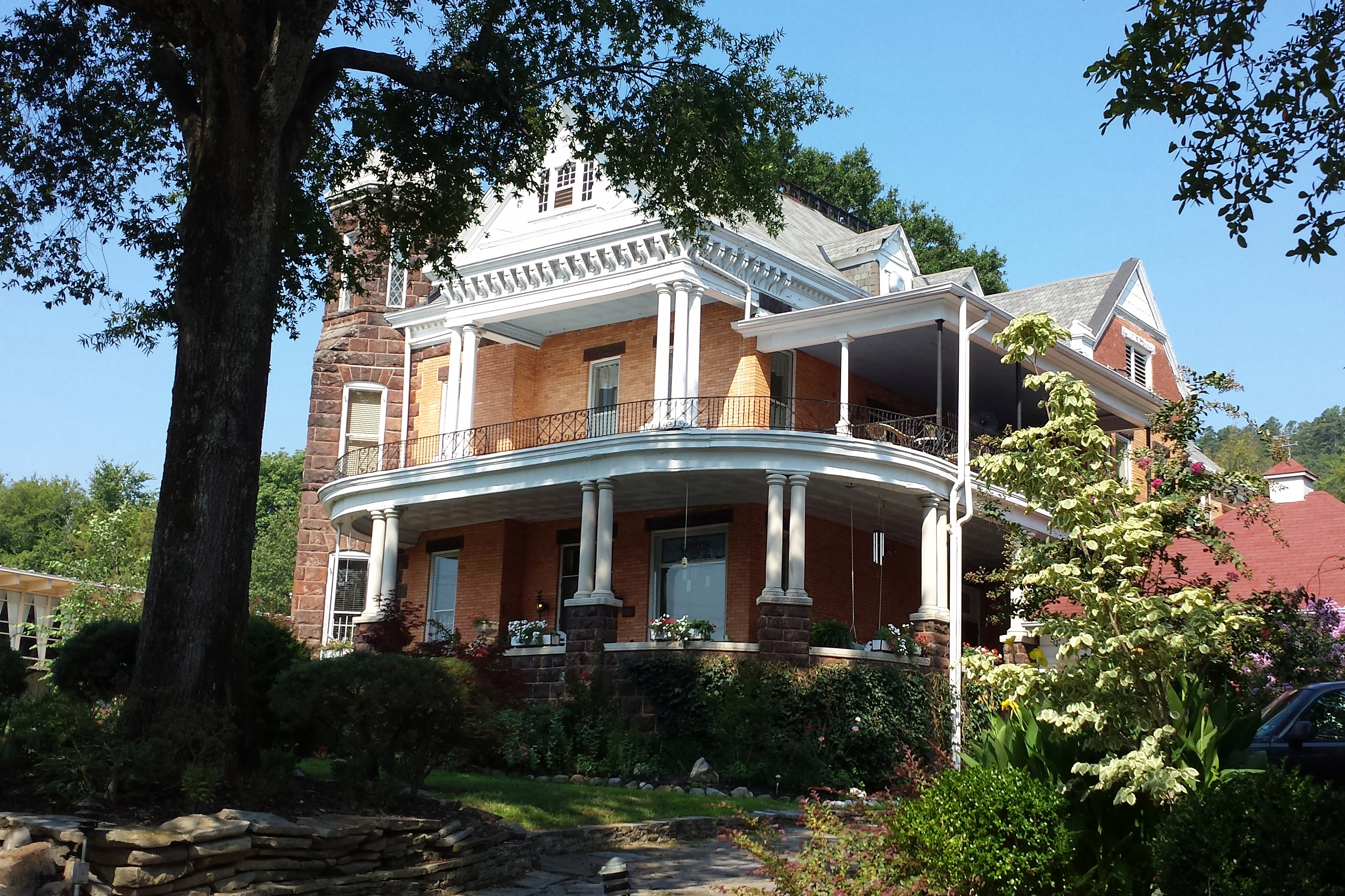

- Location within Arkansas Location within the United States
- Location: Roughly bounded by Quapaw and Prospect Aves., Hot Springs, Arkansas
- Coordinates: 34°30′18″N 93°3′47″W
- Area: 10 acres (4.0 ha)
- Built: 1890
- Architectural style: Colonial Revival, Queen Anne
- NRHP reference No.: 99000821
- Added to NRHP: March 8, 2002

The Quapaw–Prospect Historic District is a predominantly residential historic district on the northwest side of Hot Springs, Arkansas. It covers a roughly nine-block stretch of Quapaw and Prospect Streets, from their junction in the east to Grand Avenue in the west, including properties on streets running between the two. The area was developed between about 1890 and 1950, and contains a cross-section of architectural styles popular in that period. Although Colonial Revival and Craftsman style houses dominate the area, it has a particularly fine collection of Queen Anne Victorians as well.

The district was listed on the National Register of Historic Places in 2002. Four properties that are included in the district were previously listed on the National Register: they are the Walter Beauchamp House, the Williams-Wootton House, the William H. Martin House, and the Charles N. Rix House.

== See also ==
- National Register of Historic Places listings in Garland County, Arkansas
