= Walter Beauchamp House =

Historic house in Arkansas, United States

- U.S. National Register of Historic Places
- U.S. Historic district – Contributing property
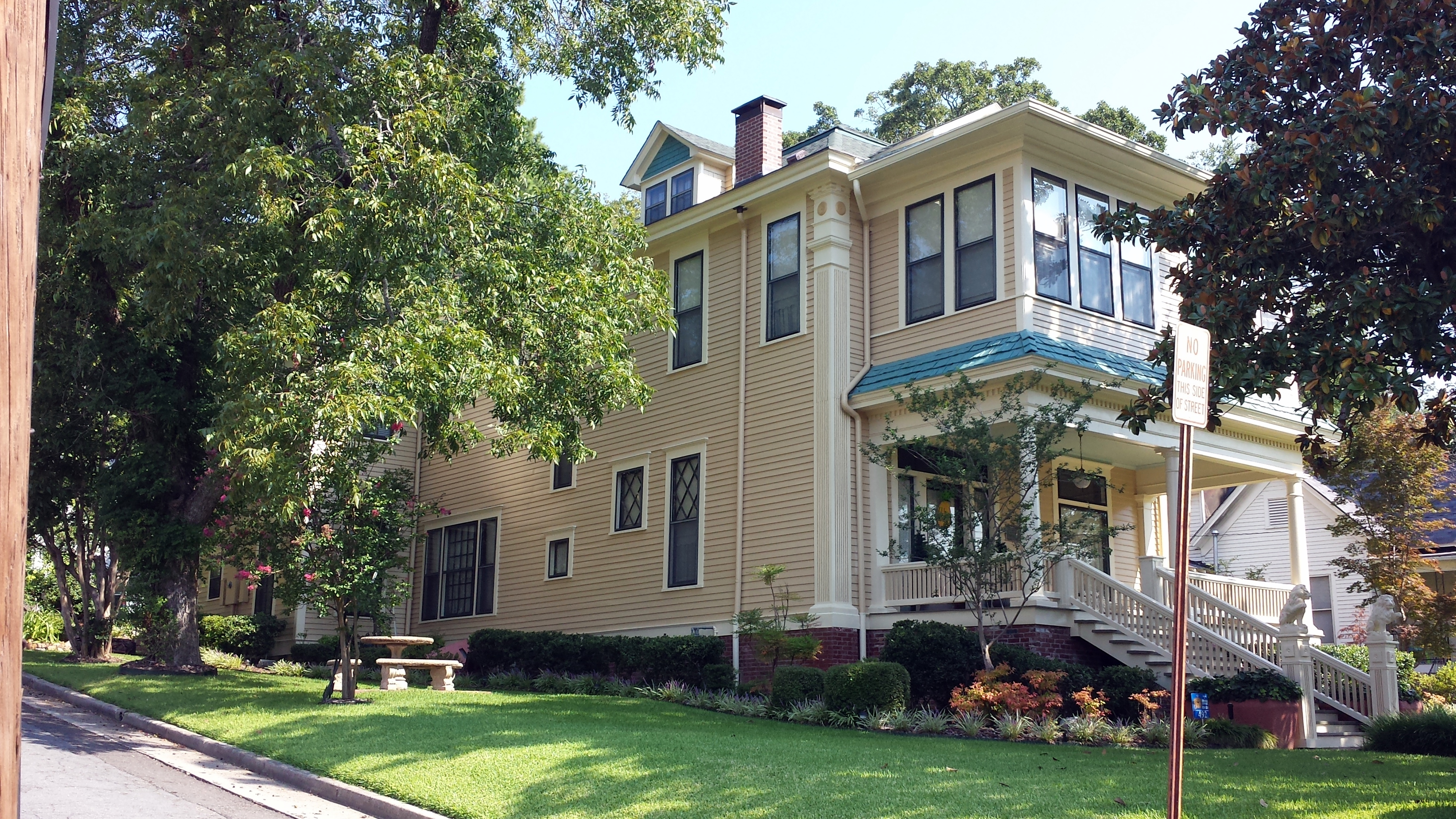

- Location within Arkansas Location within the United States
- Location: 492 Prospect Ave., Hot Springs, Arkansas
- Coordinates: 34°30′27″N 93°3′37″W
- Area: less than one acre
- Built: 1905
- Architectural style: Colonial Revival, double-decker-style
- Part of: Quapaw-Prospect Historic District (ID99000821)
- NRHP reference No.: 94000470

Significant dates
- Added to NRHP: May 19, 1994
- Designated: March 8, 2002

The Walter Beauchamp House is a historic house at 492 Prospect Avenue in Hot Springs, Arkansas. Built in 1905, it is a "double decker" single-family house, unusual both for its setting on a spacious lot, and for the style, which is generally uncommon in Hot Springs. Houses of this type are typically found on narrow lots in densely-built urban areas and have two units; this one is set on a larger lot similar to others in the neighborhood and has a single large unit. Walter Beauchamp, the builder, was a conductor on the Chicago, Rock Island and Pacific Railroad.

The house was listed on the National Register of Historic Places in 1994.

== See also ==
- National Register of Historic Places listings in Garland County, Arkansas
