= Martin Hotel =

Martin Hotel may refer to:

in the United States

(by state then city)

- Martin Hotel (Sioux City, Iowa), listed on the National Register of Historic Places (NRHP)
- Martin Hotel (Versailles, Missouri), listed on the NRHP in Morgan County
- Martin Hotel (Winnemucca, Nevada), listed on the NRHP in Humboldt County

== See also ==
- Martin Building (disambiguation)
- Martin Hall (disambiguation)
- Martin House (disambiguation)
