= Martin Building =

Martin Building may refer to:

- Martin Building (South San Francisco, California), listed on the National Register of Historic Places in San Mateo County, California
- Martin Building (El Paso, Texas), listed on the National Register of Historic Places in El Paso County, Texas

== See also ==
- Martin Hall (disambiguation)
- Martin Hotel (disambiguation)
- Martin House (disambiguation)
