= Charles N. Rix House =

Historic house in Arkansas, United States

- U.S. National Register of Historic Places
- U.S. Historic district – Contributing property
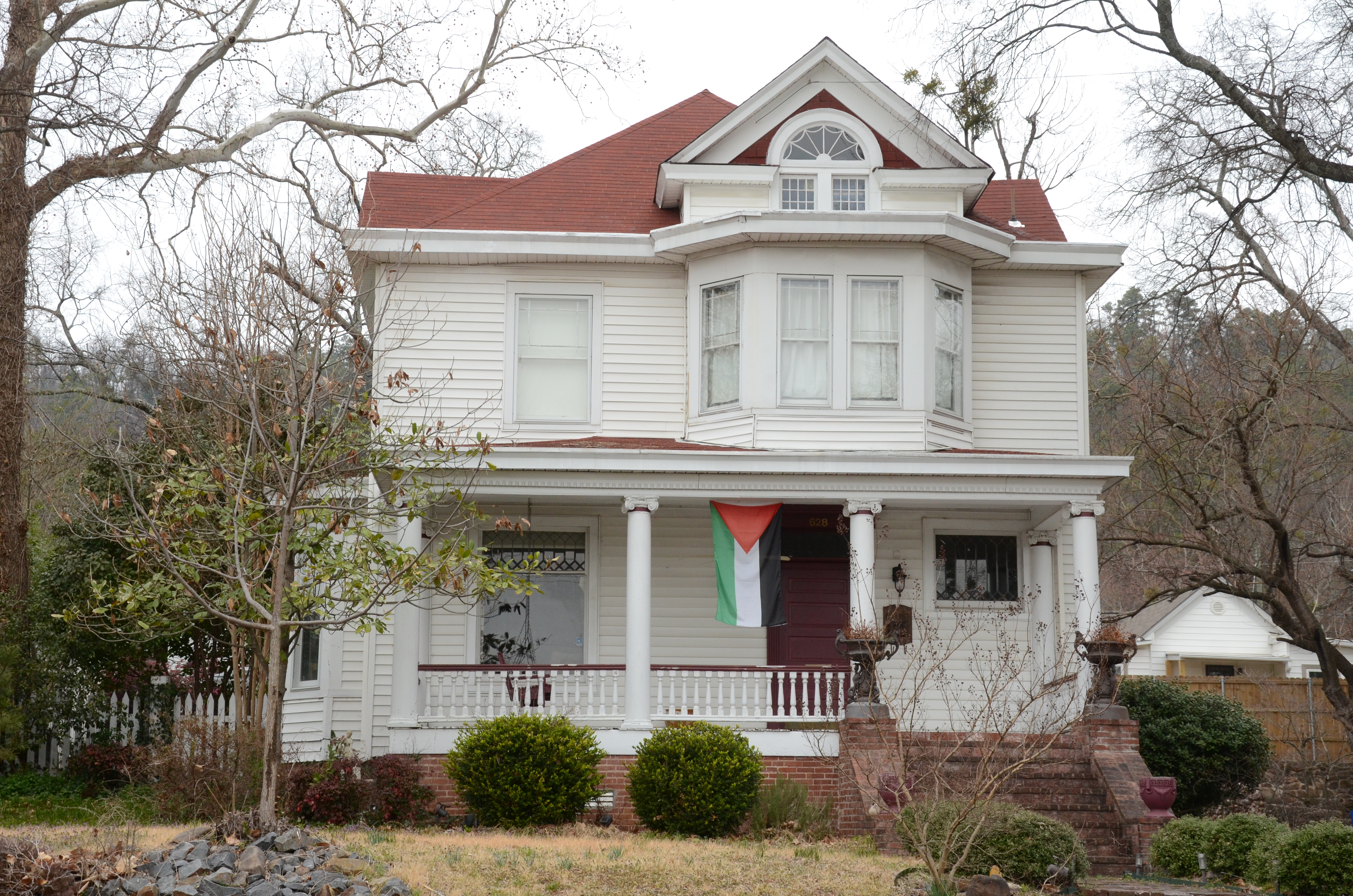

- Location within Arkansas Location within the United States
- Location: 628 Quapaw Ave., Hot Springs, Arkansas
- Coordinates: 34°30′22″N 93°3′37″W
- Area: less than one acre
- Architectural style: Colonial Revival, American Foursquare
- Part of: Quapaw-Prospect Historic District (ID99000821)
- NRHP reference No.: 92001393

Significant dates
- Added to NRHP: October 15, 1992
- Designated: March 8, 2002

The Charles N. Rix House is a historic house at 628 Quapaw Avenue in Hot Springs, Arkansas. It is a two-story American Foursquare wood-frame structure, with a hip roof and a brick foundation. It has a single-story porch extending across its front, supported by Ionic columns and a turned-spindle balustrade. The roof is adorned with projecting dormers. The house was probably built about 1907, by Charles N. Rix, a banker who moved to Hot Springs in 1879, and was a leading force in the development of the city as a resort center.

The house was listed on the National Register of Historic Places in 1992.

== See also ==
- National Register of Historic Places listings in Garland County, Arkansas
