= Martin Hall =

Martin Hall may refer to:

== People ==
- Martin Hall (rugby league) (born 1968), British rugby league footballer and coach
- Martin Hall (archaeologist), former vice-chancellor at the University of Salford

== Places ==
- Martin Hall (Hendrix College), Conway, Arkansas, listed on the NRHP in Faulkner County
- Martin Hall (Providence College), Providence, Rhode Island
- Glidden-Martin Hall, Sioux Falls, South Dakota, building listed on the NRHP in Minnehaha County
- Martin Hall at Texas College, Tyler, Texas, building listed on the NRHP in Smith County

== See also ==
- Martin Building (disambiguation)
- Martin Hotel (disambiguation)
- Martin House (disambiguation)
