= Williams-Wootton House =

Historic house in Arkansas, United States

- U.S. National Register of Historic Places
- U.S. Historic district – Contributing property
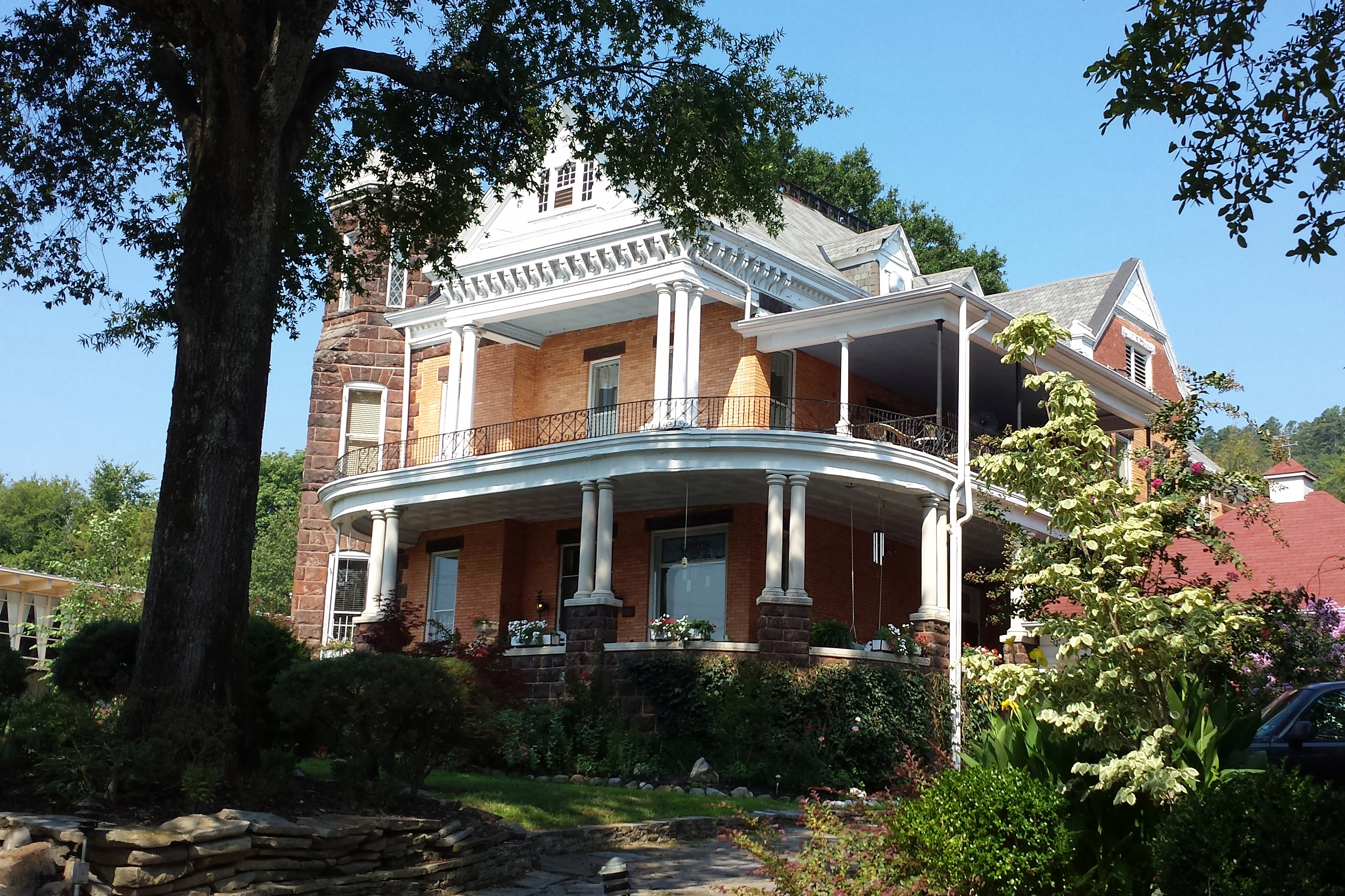

- Location within Arkansas Location within the United States
- Location: 420 Quapaw Ave., Hot Springs, Arkansas
- Coordinates: 34°30′23″N 93°3′35″W
- Area: less than one acre
- Built: 1891
- Architectural style: Colonial Revival, Gothic Revival, High Victorian
- Part of: Quapaw-Prospect Historic District (ID99000821)
- NRHP reference No.: 78000589

Significant dates
- Added to NRHP: November 30, 1978
- Designated: March 8, 2002

The Williams-Wootton House, also known as the Dr. Williams Mansion, is a historic house at 420 Quapaw Avenue in Hot Springs, Arkansas. It is a 2 1/2-story masonry structure, built out of brick, with asymmetrical massing and a variety of projecting gables, sections, and porches typical of the late Victorian Queen Anne period. It has a rounded corner porch, supported by paired Tuscan columns in the Colonial Revival style. The house was built in 1891 for Dr. Arthur Upton Williams, and was originally more strongly Queen Anne, particularly in its porch styling, which was altered in the early 20th century.

The house was listed on the National Register of Historic Places in 1978.

== See also ==
- National Register of Historic Places listings in Garland County, Arkansas
