= Jamie Martin =

Jamie Martin may refer to:

== Males ==
- Jamie Martin (American football) (born 1970), American football player
- Jamie Martin (All My Children), a fictional character of All My Children
- Jamie Martin, an actor in Consenting Adults
- Jamie B. Martin, a drug trafficker

== Females ==
- Jamie Martin, a radio personality on KAJA
- Jamie Martin, a character in Safe Harbor, portrayed by Chyler Leigh

== See also ==
- James Martin (disambiguation)
