= S. F. Martin House =

Historic house in Iowa, United States

- U.S. National Register of Historic Places
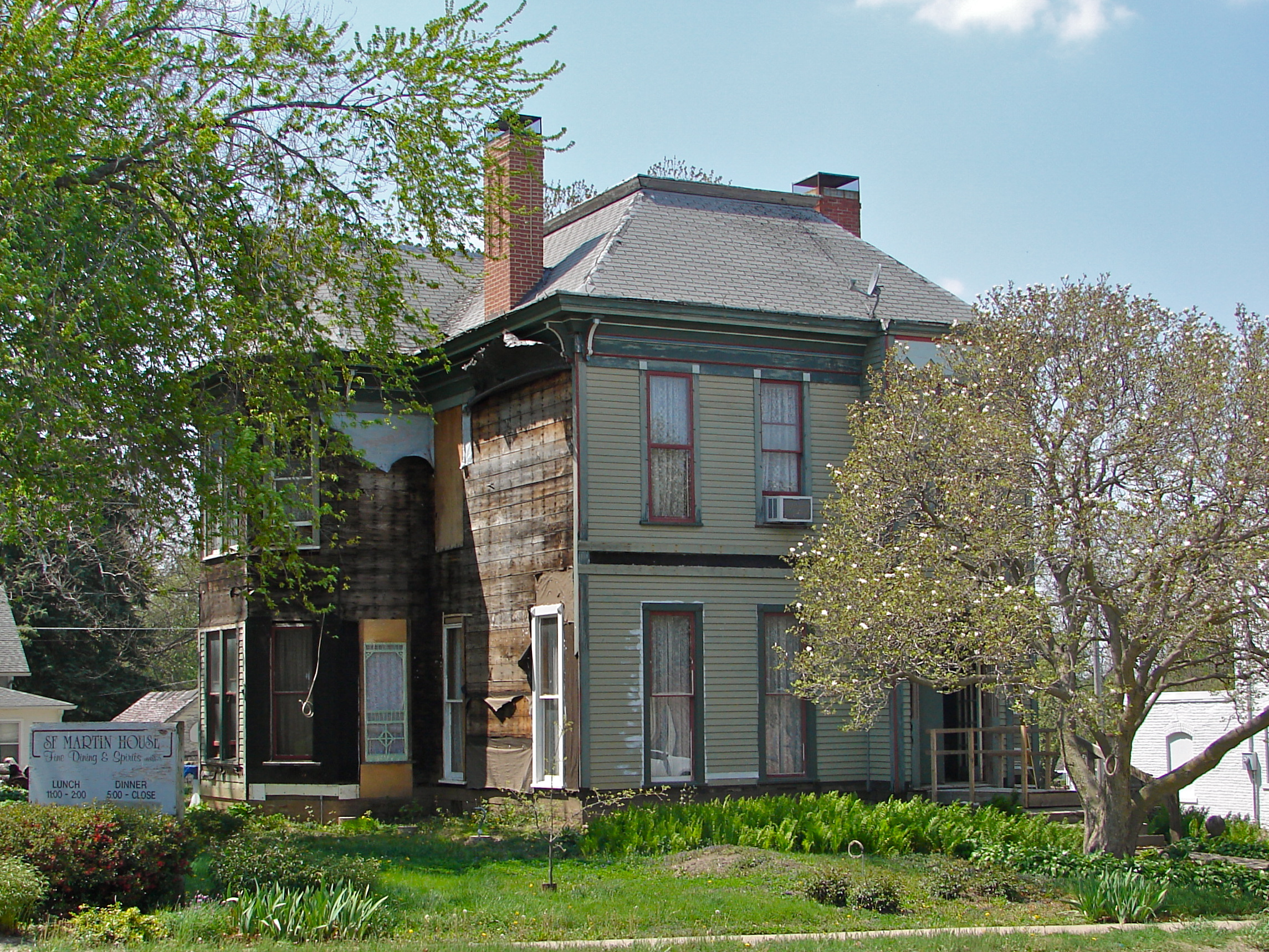

- Location within Iowa Location within the United States
- Location: 419 Poplar St. Atlantic, Iowa
- Coordinates: 41°24′22″N 95°0′53″W
- Area: less than one acre
- Built: 1874
- Architectural style: Second Empire; Italianate
- NRHP reference No.: 84001211
- Added to NRHP: January 12, 1984

The S. F. Martin House is a historic building located in Atlantic, Iowa, United States. S. F. Martin settled in Atlantic in 1865, where he opened the town's first hardware store and became involved in various industrial ventures. He acquired the property for the house between 1870 and 1872, and construction was completed in 1874. The eclectic Victorian-style house features elements of the Second Empire, Italianate, and Gothic Revival styles. It was listed on the National Register of Historic Places in 1984.
