= Martin House and Farm =

- U.S. National Register of Historic Places
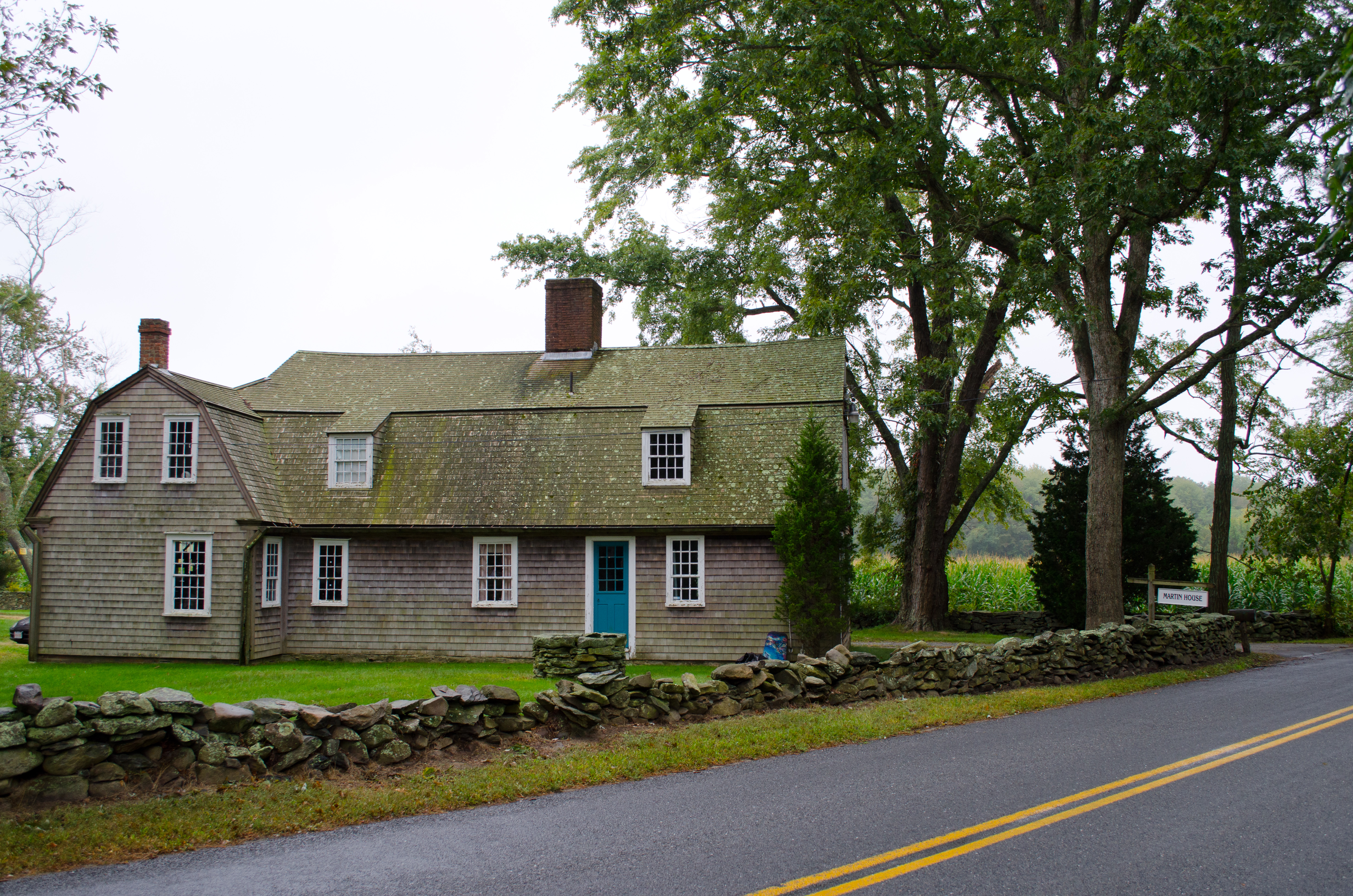
- The Martin farmhouse from Stoney Hill Road, with the farm in background

- Location within Massachusetts Location within the United States
- Location: Swansea, Massachusetts
- Coordinates: 41°45′50″N 71°15′36″W
- Area: 38 acres (15 ha)
- Built: 1728
- Architect: John Martin
- NRHP reference No.: 78000437
- Added to NRHP: October 2, 1978

The Martin House and Farm is a historic farm at 22 Stoney Hill Road in North Swansea, Massachusetts. The main house is a 1 1/2-story gambrel-roofed wood-frame structure, with a crosswise ell at the rear. The oldest portion was built in 1728 by John Martin, as a single pile structure with a gable roof. It was soon afterward extended with a kitchen space, and was enlarged about 1814, when the gambrel roof was added. The property was farmed by Martin's descendants until 1934, when the property was bequested to The National Society of the Colonial Dames of America. The house is operated by the Dames as a historic house museum. It was listed on the National Register of Historic Places in 1978.

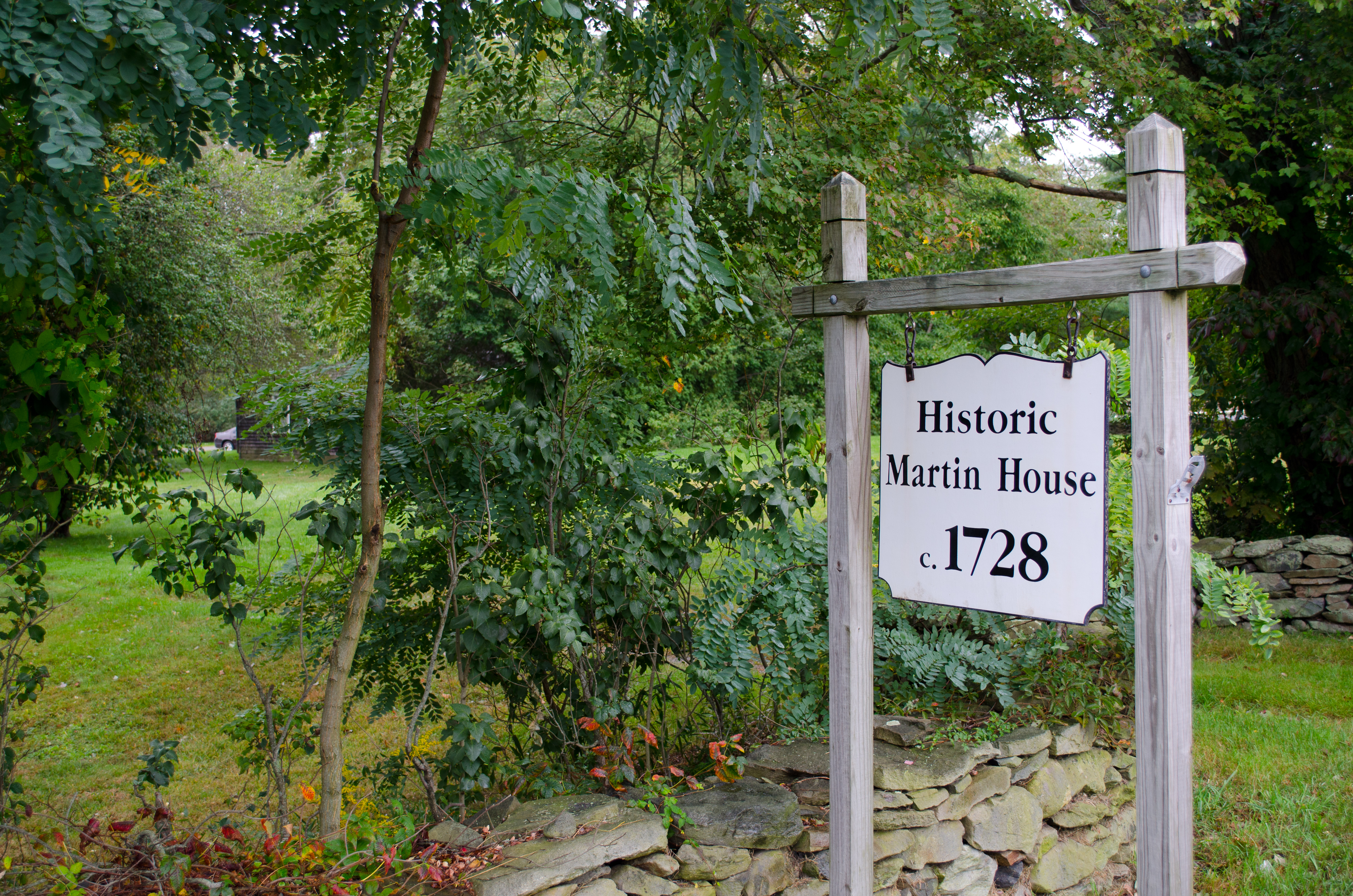
A sign marking the location of the Martin House and Farm, with the farmhouse seen through the trees

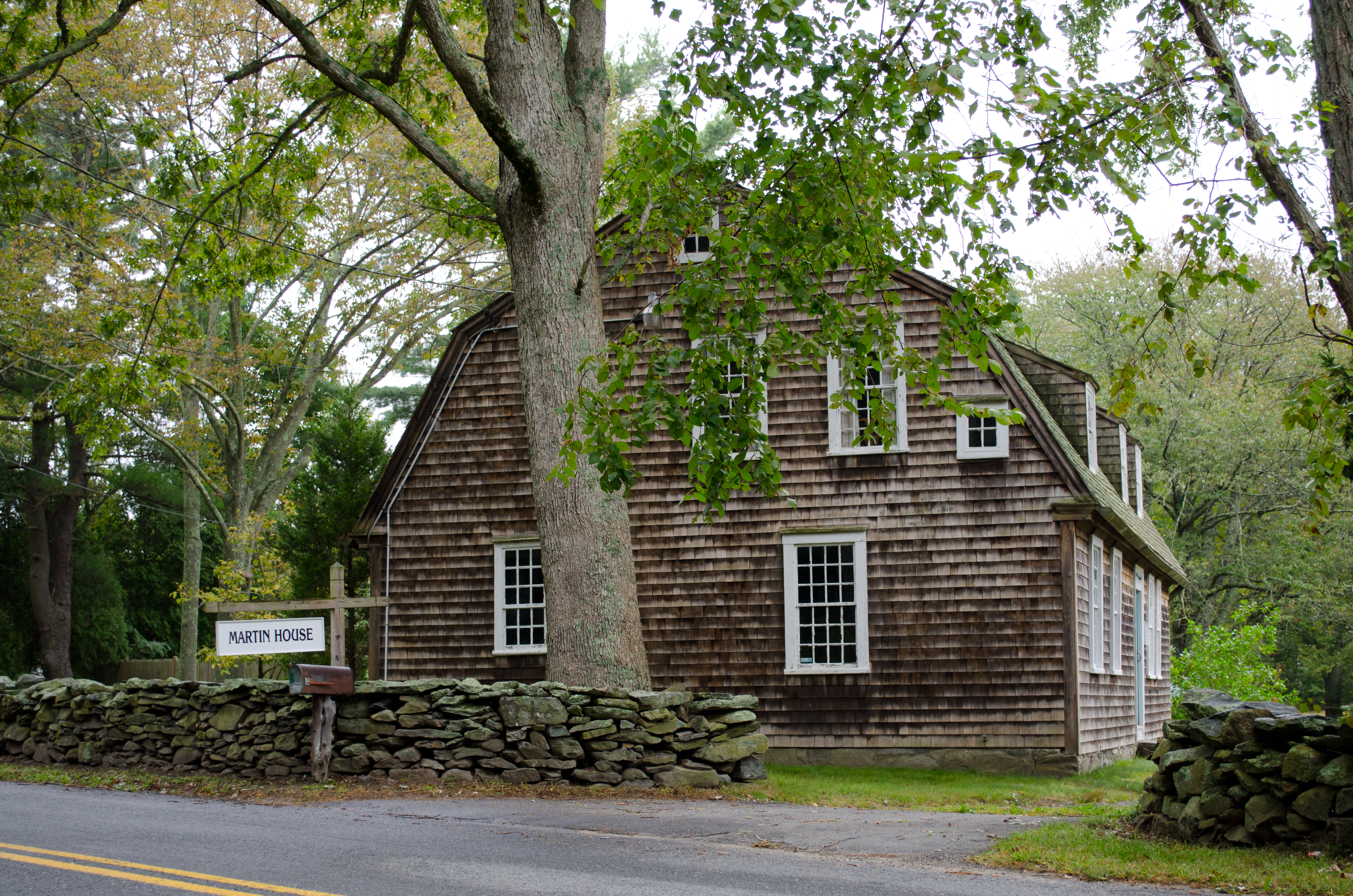
The farmhouse viewed from Stoney Hill Road

== See also ==
- National Register of Historic Places listings in Bristol County, Massachusetts
