= Abner Martin House =

Historic house in Iowa, United States

- U.S. National Register of Historic Places
- Location within Iowa Location within the United States
- Location: South of Mount Zion off Iowa Highway 1
- Coordinates: 40°46′34.1″N 91°55′39.1″W
- Area: less than one acre
- Built: 1858
- NRHP reference No.: 84001604
- Added to NRHP: April 12, 1984

The Abner Martin House, also known as The Pat Murphy Place, is a historic residence located south of Mount Zion, Iowa, United States. Abner Martin was a farmer and an early settler in Van Buren County. He originally arrived in Van Buren County in 1836. Abner & Lousia Martin began building the home in 1856 and completed construction in 1858. Abner Martin is said to have gone to California during the gold rush and obtained sufficient gold to return to Iowa and build his brick home. The house has a 3-foot-thick foundation, and all bricks were made on the property. A "tally brick" which told how many bricks were made in a specific day was found on the property. It reads 2,118.

The house's historical significance is found in its architecture. The vernacular style structure is influenced by the Federal style. Those influences are found in its long facade wall, and its lack of cornice returns. The two-story, brick house also features a low-pitched roof, which is rare in the county. It was listed on the National Register of Historic Places in 1984. The original home and farm consisted of 160 acres, the home retains 13 of those original acres with the current property owners.

Mrs. Perry Trible stated, in a 1935 interview, that her and others would hold parties at the Abner Martin House during the Civil War. Some people thought these were secret meetings. Some even went so far as to call the attendees "copperheads". Mrs Perry Trible recounted one particular instance when having a party at the Abner Martin House involving a Mr. Orth and Mrs. Martin. Mr. Orth, whose stature was slight, was designated to make osculatory advances to Mrs Martin whose stature was anything but slight. Mr Orth was disappointed according to Mrs. Perry Trible's story. The parties or secret meetings were actually nothing more than mostly harmless kissing games. The secret meetings and assumption of being "copperheads" was likely due to the Martins being lifelong Democrats which may have opposed the Republican-led Civil War with the South.

Dick and Oneita Fisher purchased the Abner Martin House in 1973 from Jerry Hootman. It had been unoccupied for several years and in a dilapidated condition. The Bordman Sherod family owned the house for years, and their daughter Blanche and her husband, E. N. (Pat) Murphy, were the last occupants before the Fishers moved in. The Fishers began restoring the home in 1975 while living in the home and were the applicants to place the Abner Martin House on the National Register of Historic Places. The Fishers did most of the work themselves which for them was a labor of love. Dick and Oneita Fisher completed restoration on the home and continued to live in the house into the 1980s but did have to tear down a carriage barn on the property. The Abner Martin House was included on several tours with the local historical societies in the area of both Bentonsport and Keosauqua.

After the Fishers, the Abner Martin House again fell into disrepair over the years until it was purchased by Jim & Teresa Huffman in 2006. The Huffmans later began and completed a large restoration project at the house; updating and replacing all interior and exterior structure and materials. The house is currently restored and well maintained on the 13 acres of wooded land.

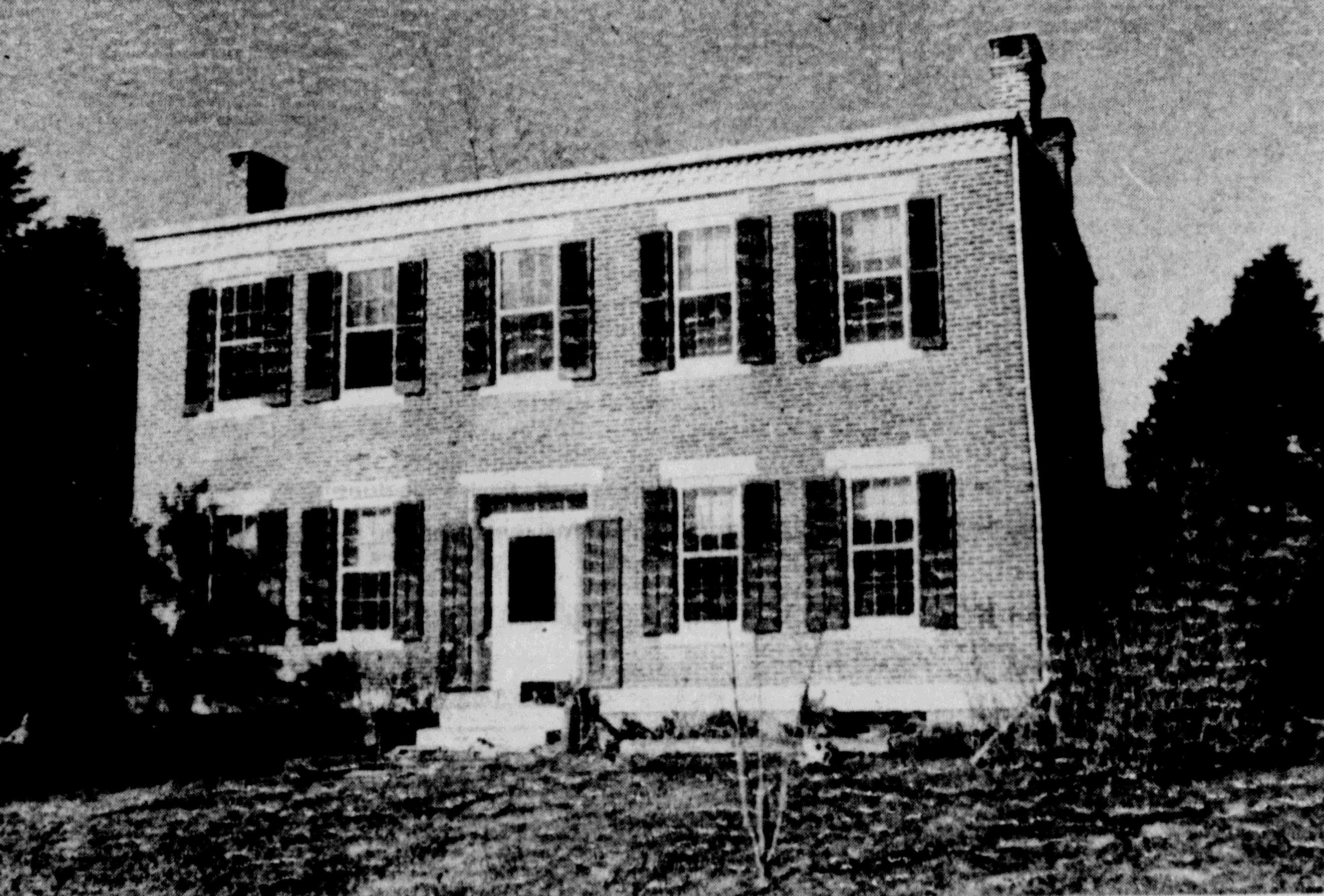
Abner Martin House in 1979.

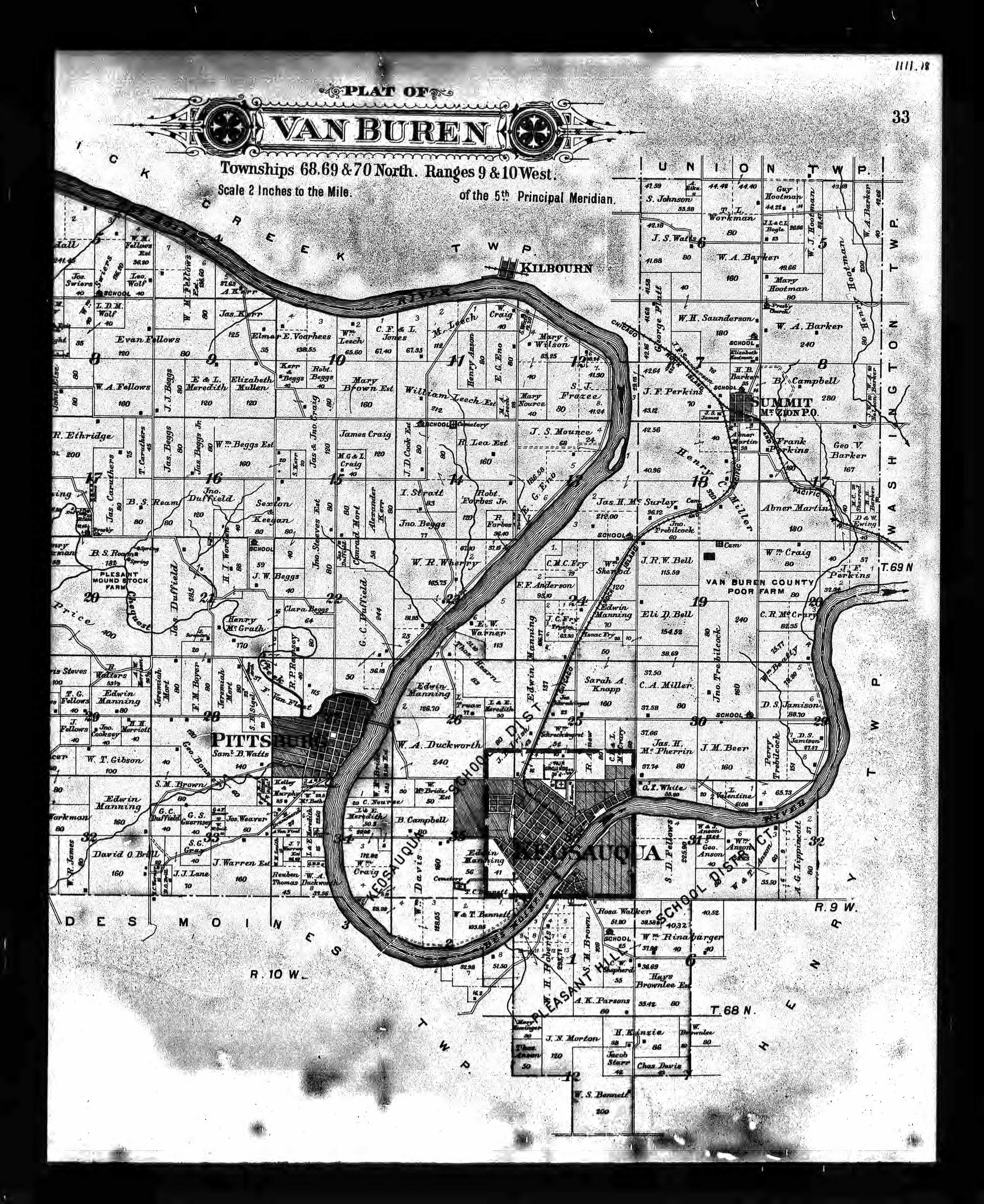
Van Buren County Iowa Plat Map from 1897 with Abner Martin House and farm land. Two parcels just south and south east of Mt Zion.
