= Jimmy Leawood Martin =

American politician

Member of the South Carolina House of Representatives for Lexington County
- In office 1969–1970

Member of the South Carolina Senate from the 8th district
- In office 1972–1976

Personal details
- Born: August 24, 1934 (age 91) Aynor, South Carolina
- Party: Democratic
- Occupation: realtor

Jimmy Leawood Martin (born August 24, 1934) is an American former politician in the state of South Carolina. He served in the South Carolina Senate as a member of the Democratic Party from 1972 to 1976 and in the South Carolina House of Representatives from 1969 to 1970, representing Richland County, South Carolina. He is a realtor in West Columbia, South Carolina.
