= Aaron Martin Houses =

Historic houses in Massachusetts, United States

- U.S. National Register of Historic Places
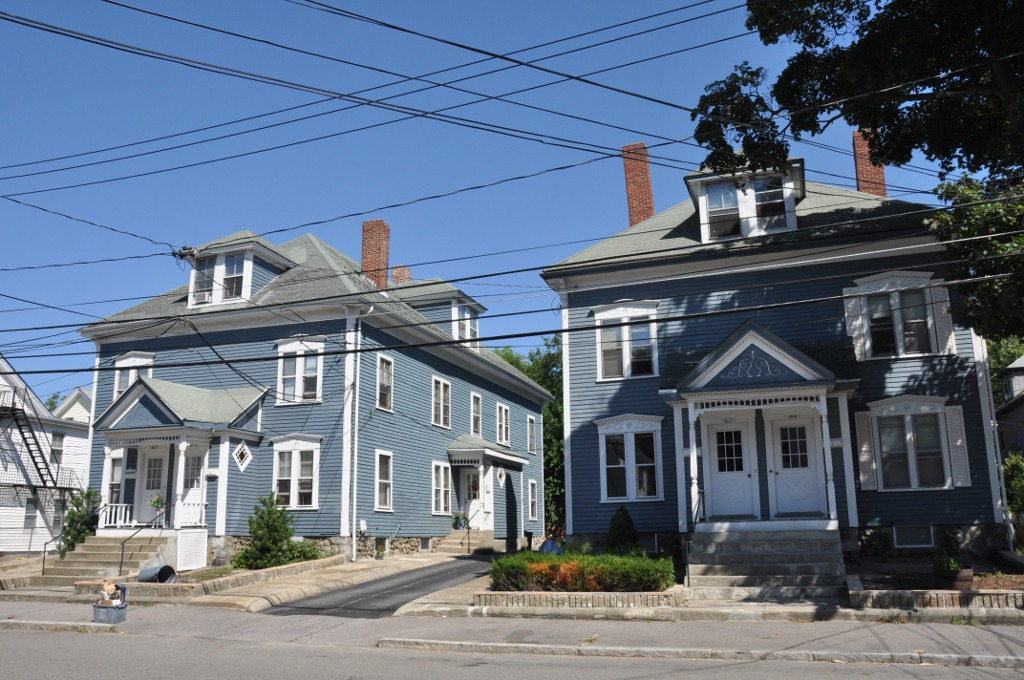

- Location within Massachusetts Location within the United States
- Location: 188 and 194 Adams Street, Waltham, Massachusetts
- Coordinates: 42°21′51″N 71°14′30″W
- Built: 1892
- Architectural style: Colonial Revival, Queen Anne
- MPS: Waltham MRA
- NRHP reference No.: 89001486
- Added to NRHP: September 28, 1989

The Aaron Martin Houses are a pair of historic houses in Waltham, Massachusetts. Built between 1892 and 1900, these Colonial Revival houses have similar massing, with hip roofs and double-window hip dormers. Windows on their main facades are treated with pediments incised with floral decoration, and their porches have turned posts. They were built by Aaron Martin, a real estate speculator and Waltham Watch Company employee who lived in a more elaborate house on Moody Street.

The houses were listed on the National Register of Historic Places in 1989.

== See also ==
- National Register of Historic Places listings in Waltham, Massachusetts
