= Aaron Martin House =

Historic house in Massachusetts, United States

- U.S. National Register of Historic Places
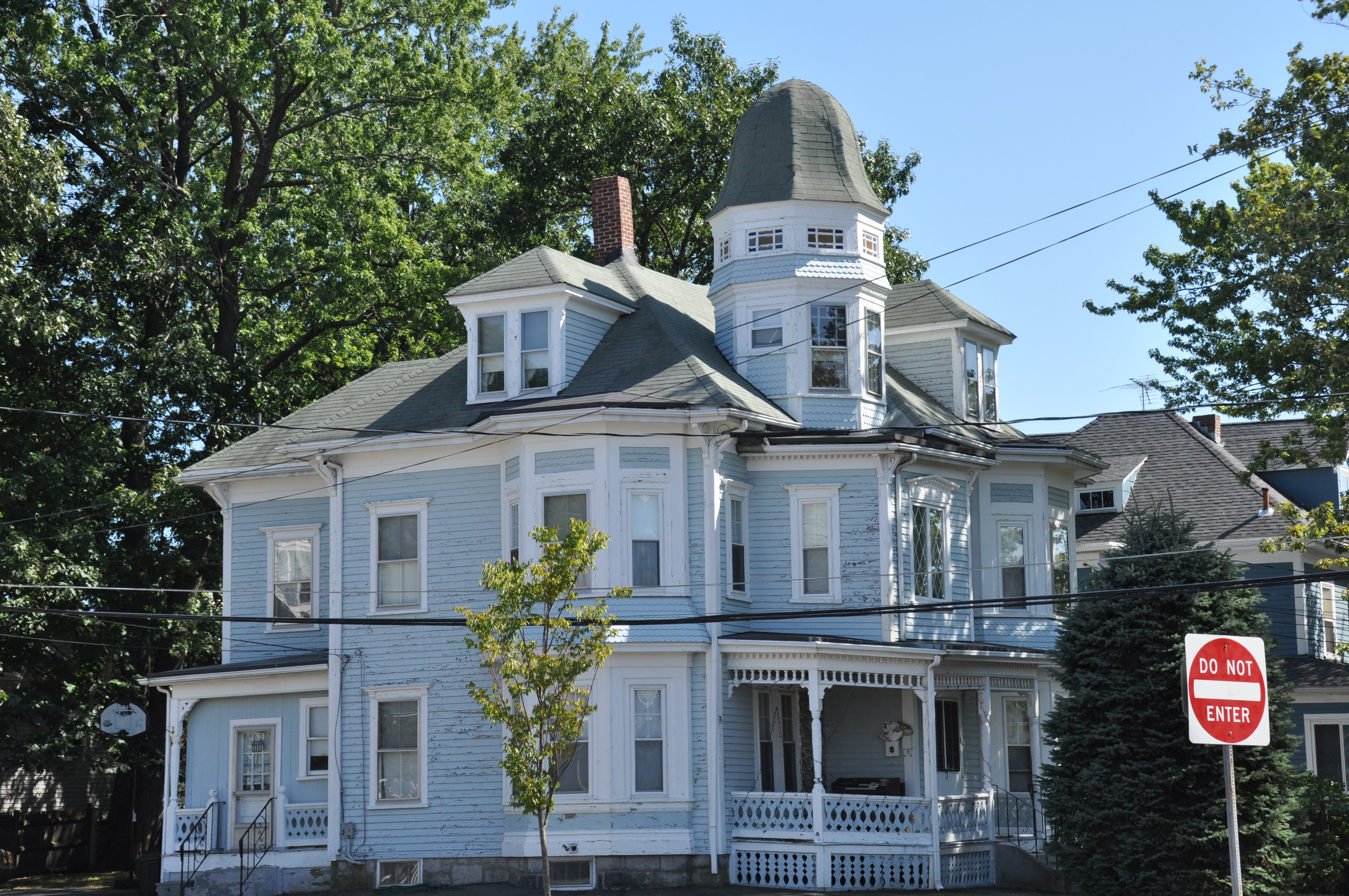

- Location within Massachusetts
- Location: 786 Moody Street, Waltham, Massachusetts
- Coordinates: 42°21′45″N 71°14′20″W
- Architectural style: Queen Anne
- MPS: Waltham MRA
- NRHP reference No.: 89001540
- Added to NRHP: September 28, 1989

The Aaron Martin House is a historic house in Waltham, Massachusetts. The 2 1/2-story wood-frame house was built in the 1890s by Waltham Watch Company employee and real estate speculator Aaron Martin. It is a particularly well-preserved local example of Queen Anne styling. It has a variety of projections, gables, and porches, in a manner typical of the style, as well as a 3 1/2-story tower with a bell-shaped roof. Its porches are elaborately decorated with gingerbread woodwork.

The house was built in a Queen Anne style and was added to the National Register of Historic Places in 1989.

== See also ==
- Aaron Martin Houses
- National Register of Historic Places listings in Waltham, Massachusetts
