= Harden Thomas Martin House =

Historic house in North Carolina, United States

- U.S. National Register of Historic Places
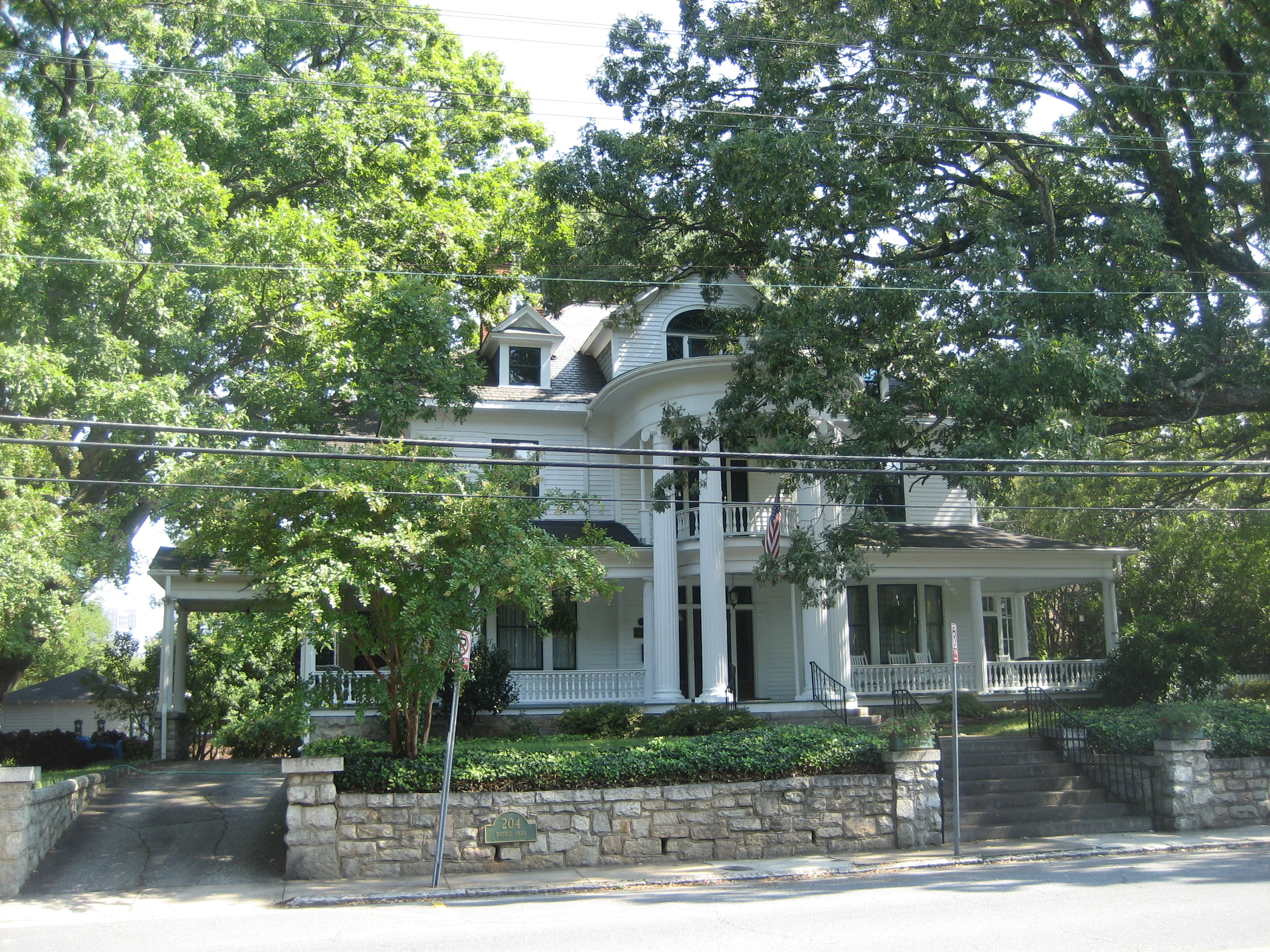
- Harden Thomas Martin House, September 2012

- Location within North Carolina Location within the United States
- Location: 204 N. Mendenhall St., Greensboro, North Carolina
- Coordinates: 36°4′28″N 79°48′9″W
- Area: 0.5 acres (0.20 ha)
- Built: 1909
- Architect: Armfield, G. Will
- Architectural style: Colonial Revival
- NRHP reference No.: 85003217
- Added to NRHP: December 19, 1985

Harden Thomas Martin House is a historic home located at Greensboro, Guilford County, North Carolina. It was built in 1909, and is a 2 1/2-story, double pile, Colonial Revival style frame dwelling. It consists of a main block with shallow, gable-roofed projections; two one-story, hip-roofed rear wings; and a porte-cochere. The front facade features a bowed, two-story portico supported by four fluted Ionic order columns with large terra cotta capitals. Also on the property are two contributing frame outbuildings.

It was listed on the National Register of Historic Places in 1985.
