= Hendrick Martin House =

Historic house in New York, United States

- U.S. National Register of Historic Places
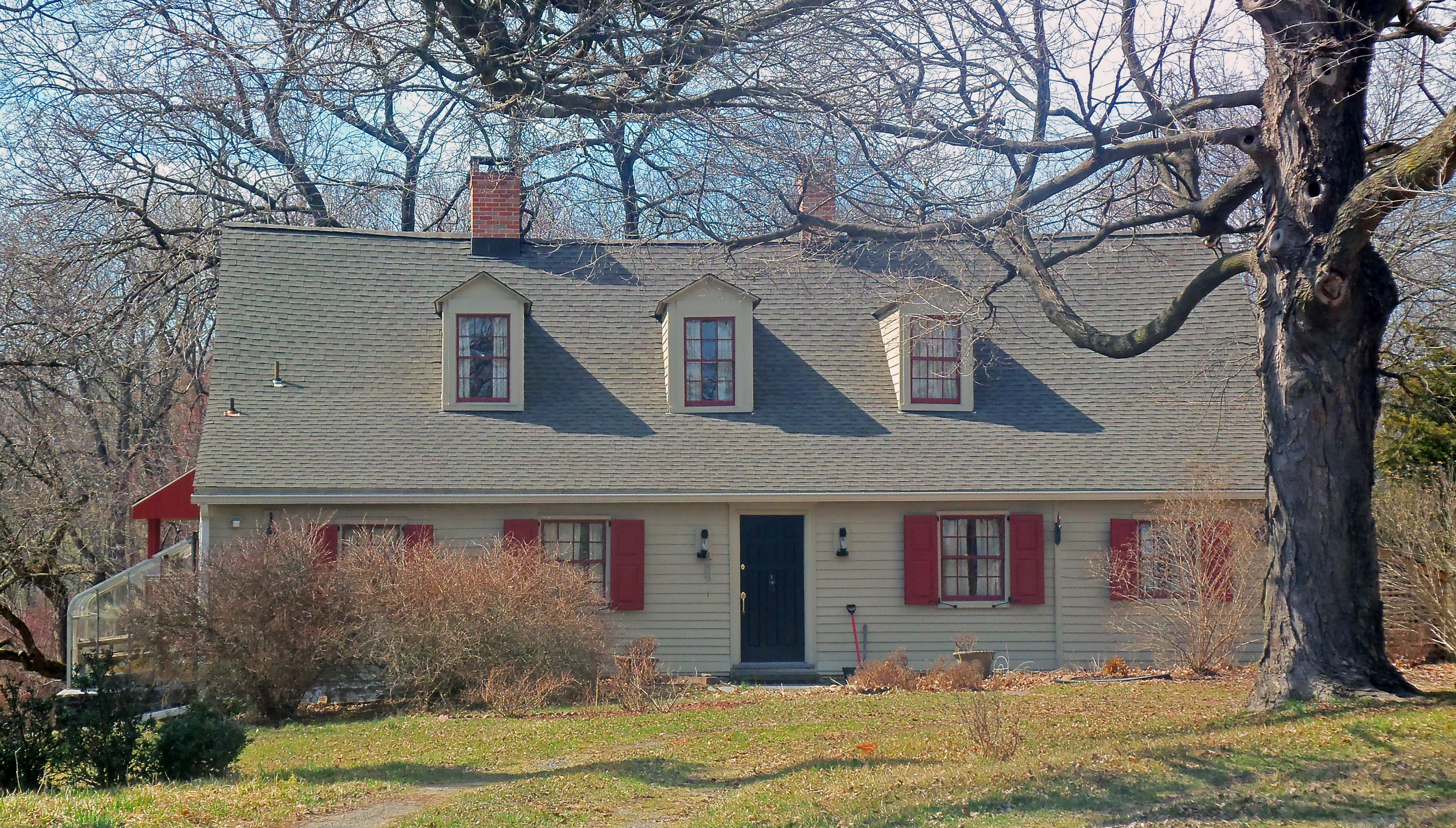
- East elevation, 2013

- Location within New York Location within the United States
- Location: Red Hook, New York
- Nearest city: Kingston, New York
- Coordinates: 42°0′17″N 73°52′27″W
- Area: 7.5 acres (3.0 ha)
- Built: 1750
- NRHP reference No.: 07000776
- Added to NRHP: August 2, 2007

The Hendrick Martin House is located on Willowbrook Lane in the town of Red Hook, New York, United States, just north of Red Hook village. It is a stone house built in two phases in the mid- and late 18th century. In 2007 it was listed on the National Register of Historic Places.

It has been claimed by its present owners to be the oldest house in the town. Martin, who may not have been the original owner, was a second-generation Palatine German who chose to settle down in the area. The older sections of the house reflect German building traditions, not as common in the Hudson Valley's stone houses as Dutch ones. Later sections incorporating designs from other cultures present in the area by that period. In the 19th century it passed from the Martins' ownership into others; the most recent owners have undertaken renovations that have both modernized it and brought it back to its original appearance.

== Building and grounds ==
The house is located on an irregularly shaped 7.49-acre (3.03 ha) parcel on unpaved Willowbrook Lane, roughly a thousand feet (300 m) northwest of North Broadway (the old Albany Post Road, also part of U.S. Route 9). It is in the town of Red Hook, just north of the similarly named village; a small undeveloped southern corner of the property, approximately one acre (4,000 m^{2}), is within the village. At the property, the road bends to the north, towards a dead end at a Dutch barn that was on the Martin land in the past.

The terrain is gently rolling, with worked open fields on the east from which the Catskill Escarpment across the Hudson River can be seen. There is another, more modern house on the north side of Willowbrook midway between the Martin House and North Broadway. On the east the land is wooded, reflecting the presence of the Saw Kill, a tributary of the Hudson which bounds the property on the east. Between the house and the stream is a small pond and old farm road.

At the bend in Willowbrook, the driveway continues straight, curving around slightly downhill behind some large mature deciduous shade trees. The house is to its west, built into the gentle slope. The basement is thus exposed on the west (rear) elevation. On the southwest a small garden has been added by the current owners; it is considered a non-contributing resource to the National Register listing.

=== Exterior ===
The house itself is rectangular in plan, 49 feet (15 m) (five bays) long by 33 feet (10 m) deep, one and a half stories high, with the exposed basement giving it the feel of an additional story. It has two-foot-thick (61 cm) load-bearing walls of local rubblestone, the larger stones used to form quoins at the corners. A four-foot-deep (120 cm) timber frame addition on the east (front) elevation faced in clapboard. Atop the house is a side-gabled roof covered in asphalt shingles, pierced by two brick chimneys in the center. Its pitch levels a bit on the east, forming a shed-style roof over the frame addition.

On the east elevation is a centrally located main entrance, flanked with two modern wall lights. On either side are two eight-over-eight double-hung sash windows with wooden shutters in square openings. Those nearer the entrance are larger than the two outside windows. A drainpipe separates the two on the north. Three gabled dormer windows with six-over-six double-hung sash pierce the roof above.

The north side is faced entirely in stone. It has two windows in the center of each story, both six-over-six double-hung sash. The south side is stone to the roofline, above which it turns to brick laid in Flemish bond. At the west corner it has a door to which a pent-roofed wooden stair leads from the ground. Next to it is a modern solarium and a window set with six-over-six double-hung sash. Another similarly treated window in the gable apex. A casement window is on the west corner at basement level.

Two more doors are located on the west (rear) elevation. One leads to the basement; the other to the first floor, with a flight of wooden stairs. All the other bays have windows, either six-over-six double-hung sash windows similar to those elsewhere on the house or six-light casements. A large seam visible in the stoneworks next to the first-story entrance delineates the original section of the house from that added later on.

=== Interior ===
The main entrance is a paneled door set in a plain wooden surround. It opens into a central hall with a stone wall on the north side and a partition wall and enclosed staircase to the basement and attic on the south. The floors are timber; the ceilings have exposed beams which have in some instances been shaved and planed to create headroom. There is a large living room to the north, and two smaller rooms to the south.

On the south wall of the living room is a large brick Rumford fireplace with angled cheeks on the firebox. Its mantel is done in a vernacular Greek Revival style, with thin framing pilasters topped by a wide, plain entablature with a molded cornice and plain shelf. Shelving with wide-board sheathing fills out the stone wall to the west. All the other walls are plaster on metal lath over the original plastered stone.

The east room is the larger of the two southern rooms. It has a plainer fireplace with a shallow firebox in its west wall. Next to it is an original cupboard, with hand-planed wide-board doors hung on HL wrought iron hinges. A door on the east opens into a small room, currently used as a bathroom, in the front frame addition. In the smaller room to the west, the beams were not shaved down.

A similar central hallway divides the basement. On its north, the large space functions as a kitchen. Its fireplace has a brick firebox with a full-width hewn timber nailer across the top. Above it is the cradle for the hearth of the fireplace above. Its ceiling beams, too, retain their original dimensions. In the south room, used for handling the house's modern heating and electrical systems, there is another fireplace with an original brick bake oven next to it.

Upstairs from the main floor, the garret is used for bedrooms. Its ceilings were built at the height of the rafter collars. A slight break in the height of the floorboards corresponds with the masonry seam on the west wall, showing where the original house was added to. There is also evidence of the earlier smoke hood for the larger downstairs fireplace, and the north bedroom shows evidence of the stairway that once existed on that side of the house.

== History ==
The Martin family were probably among the Palatine Germans who fled that region of Germany for London in the late 17th century. The Palatinate had barely begun to recover from the Thirty Years' War when the War of the Grand Alliance, also called the Nine Years' War, broke out in 1688 and France invaded again. Ultimately 30,000 residents of the area made their way to London, and the Crown dealt with this growing population of the displaced in 1710 by resettling some of them elsewhere in the nascent British Empire.

One such plan put the refugees to work in lands in the Hudson Valley, acquired from the Dutch a few decades earlier, producing naval stores. However the mostly tropical plants that produced tar, rosin and pitch did not endure well in the region's harsh winters, and after a year or two the plan was abandoned. The settlers remained, and took note of the fertile farmlands available in New York. Some moved to other regions of the colony, but others remained in the area they had been brought to along the east bank of the Hudson in what is now the northwest corner of Dutchess County and southwestern Columbia County between Staatsburg and Germantown. They established farms amongst the local European colonial population, descended from Dutch and British settlers.

Among those who were relocated to the Hudson Valley in 1710 were Johan Heinrich Mertens and Catherine Esenroth. They met and married while living in West Camp, across the Hudson from Red Hook, in what is today the Ulster County town of Saugerties. Their first son, Hendrick, was born there five years later. In 1736, Hendrick himself married Elizabeth Emmerich; the couple at the time resided in Kaatsbaan, also in Saugerties.

An 1882 history suggests that the Martin house was built as early as 1730. But records show that all four of Hendrick Martin's children were baptized in Kaatsbaan, the last by 1743, suggesting the family had not moved across the river before that year. In 1751 the deed for the property which includes the house was recorded. It seems likely that the house was built near the latter end of that period.

As originally constructed, the house was the section to the north of the current main entrance, with a single room on each story. This layout is a common feature with other German-built stone houses from the same period in the area, such as the Stone Jug in Clermont, also listed on the Register, and the Kocherthal House in West Camp. All three are also built into banked terrain, creating partially exposed basements.

Some other features, while found on the other two houses, are not exclusive to German stone houses. The original stacked hearths, necessitated by the jambless fireplaces in place at that time, are also found on the Jan Van Hoesen House in the Columbia County town of Claverack and the Abraham Hasbrouck House, a contributing property to the Huguenot Street National Historic Landmark District across the river in New Paltz, in southern Ulster County. The former is of Dutch construction, the latter of Dutch-influenced Belgian Huguenot construction.

The Martin family prospered and grew. By 1770, based on the use of exposed beams that were not reduced in dimension, it was necessary to expand the house, something that had not been done to the other German-built houses in the region. The expansion plan followed the Dutch practice of extending the existing structure in one of its lateral directions rather than building a new section, story or wing, other than building the frame extension on the front, with its middle three bays open, creating a recessed porch. Other local cultural influences were present as well—the new section's fireplaces were in English styles.

In his will, Martin divided his property among his two younger sons, David and Gottlieb. By the 1790s records show that Henry, the oldest son, was living in the house, while Gottlieb was living nearby in a newer house that still stands near the intersection of Willowbrook and Broadway. David had apparently left the area after conveying the land on which Gottlieb built his house to his brother.

It is not known yet who owned the house through the middle of the next century. But around 1810, it is believed, the original Federal style mantel on the main fireplace was replaced with the current one. The same 1882 history that assesses the house as being built around 1730 claims that the house had never passed out of the Martin family, although Edward Martin, the family member living in the area at that time, appeared to be living in the house Gottlieb Martin had built rather than the older one, which was recorded as being the residence of E.L. Traver, another farmer and member of a prominent local family of longstanding residence in the area.

By the 1940s, photographs suggest that the recessed porch on the east had been enclosed, bringing the house to its current appearance. The Martins had sold it by then, and it had passed through a variety of owners, who were not always able to keep the aging house adequately maintained. At the end of the 20th century, it was bought by its current owners, who spent a decade renovating and restoring before its listing on the Register.

== See also ==
- National Register of Historic Places in Dutchess County, New York
