= James Martin (photographer) =

James Martin is an American photojournalist, photo editor, and creative director. He covers Silicon Valley and the broader technology industry.

Martin has photographed the tech pioneers of Google and Facebook, as well as launches at Apple and NASA. His work has appeared primarily on CBSNews.com and CNET.

Currently, he lives and works in San Francisco.
