= Martin House (Greenville, Kentucky) =

Historic house in Kentucky, United States

- U.S. National Register of Historic Places
- Location within Kentucky Location within the United States
- Location: 144 E. Main Cross St., Greenville, Kentucky
- Coordinates: 37°12′6″N 87°10′29″W
- Area: 5.3 acres (2.1 ha)
- Built: 1870
- Architectural style: Colonial Revival, Italianate
- MPS: Greenville Kentucky MRA
- NRHP reference No.: 85001900
- Added to NRHP: August 15, 1985

The Martin House is a historic house located at 144 E. Main Cross St. in Greenville, Kentucky.

The home initially had an Italianate design which featured decorative bracketing beneath its eaves. Tobacco merchant Rufus Martin bought the house in 1899, and he and his son remodeled it in the following decade. Martin's additions were mainly done in the Colonial Revival style and included a front porch supported by Tuscan columns. After Martin died in 1902, his son inherited the house; as of the 1980s, the home remained in his family. The home was converted into an apartment building in 1941 and occupied as such until 2007.

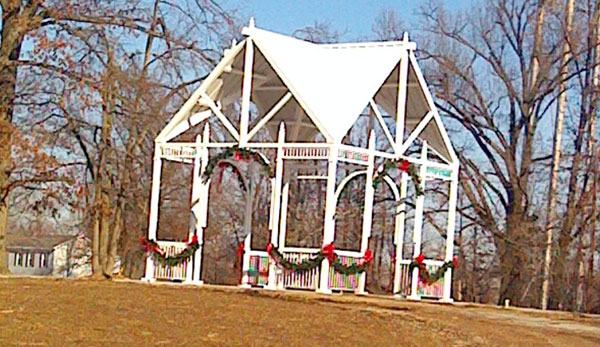
The Martin House was razed in 2013, and this gazebo was erected on the site.

The house was added to the National Register of Historic Places on August 15, 1985.

Due to its deteriorating condition, the house was razed in 2013, and the Felix E. Martin Foundation gifted the bproperty to the City of Greenville to be available for development into a public park.
