= Jimmy Martin (judoka) =

American judoka

Jimmy Martin is a former 7 time US National Champion in judo, and a two-time Olympian for judo. He is a former Black Belt Magazine Competitor of the year for Judo.
