= James Martin (Maine politician) =

American politician (1965–2018)

James R. Martin

Member of the Maine House of Representatives from the 18th district
- In office December 3, 2008 – December 1, 2010
- Preceded by: Michael Dunn
- Succeeded by: James W. Parker

Personal details
- Born: James Ray Martin, Jr. October 8, 1965 Des Moines, Iowa, U.S.
- Died: April 9, 2018 (aged 52)
- Party: Democratic
- Spouse: Scott W. (m. 2000)
- Children: 1
- Education: University of Maine
- Occupation: IT consultant
- Website: jimmartin.com

James R. Martin (October 8, 1965 – April 9, 2018) was an American IT consultant and politician from the state of Maine. A Democrat, he served a single term in the Maine House of Representatives, representing the 18th district which encompasses his hometown of Orono, as well as Veazie and the northeast side of Bangor.

Born in Des Moines, Iowa, Martin grew up in Missouri. His stepfather served in the armed forces and Martin spent part of his youth at the U.S. Air Force base in Adana, Turkey. On leaving high school in 1984, he moved to Maine and, in 1992, he earned a Bachelor of Arts degree in Social Work from the University of Maine in Orono. He became a social worker, practicing in Penobscot County. Martin worked in the IT industry, opening a small business in Orono.

Martin was active in Maine politics for much of his life, becoming actively involved in Maine Won't Discriminate in the 1990s, and many LGBT rights campaigns. He served as chair of the Penobscot County Democratic Committee and was a delegate to the 2004 Democratic National Convention. He first ran for public office in 2008, seeking to succeed Rep. Michael Dunn in the 18th House district. Dunn, a Democrat who had only narrowly been re-elected in 2006 (with 52% of the vote), had decided against running for re-election. Martin did not attract any primary opponents but faced two opponents, a Republican and an Independent, in the general election. Martin won 39% of the vote, beating Independent Thomas Mooney, by only 119 votes (2.5%), with Republican Patrick Joyce finishing third on 24%. He took office in December 2008. He ran for re-election in 2010 but lost to Republican James W. Parker by 207 votes (6.0%).

Martin was openly gay. He died at home with his husband and son by his side due to ALS on April 9, 2018.
