= Dr. G.S. Martin House =

Historic house in Iowa, United States

- U.S. National Register of Historic Places
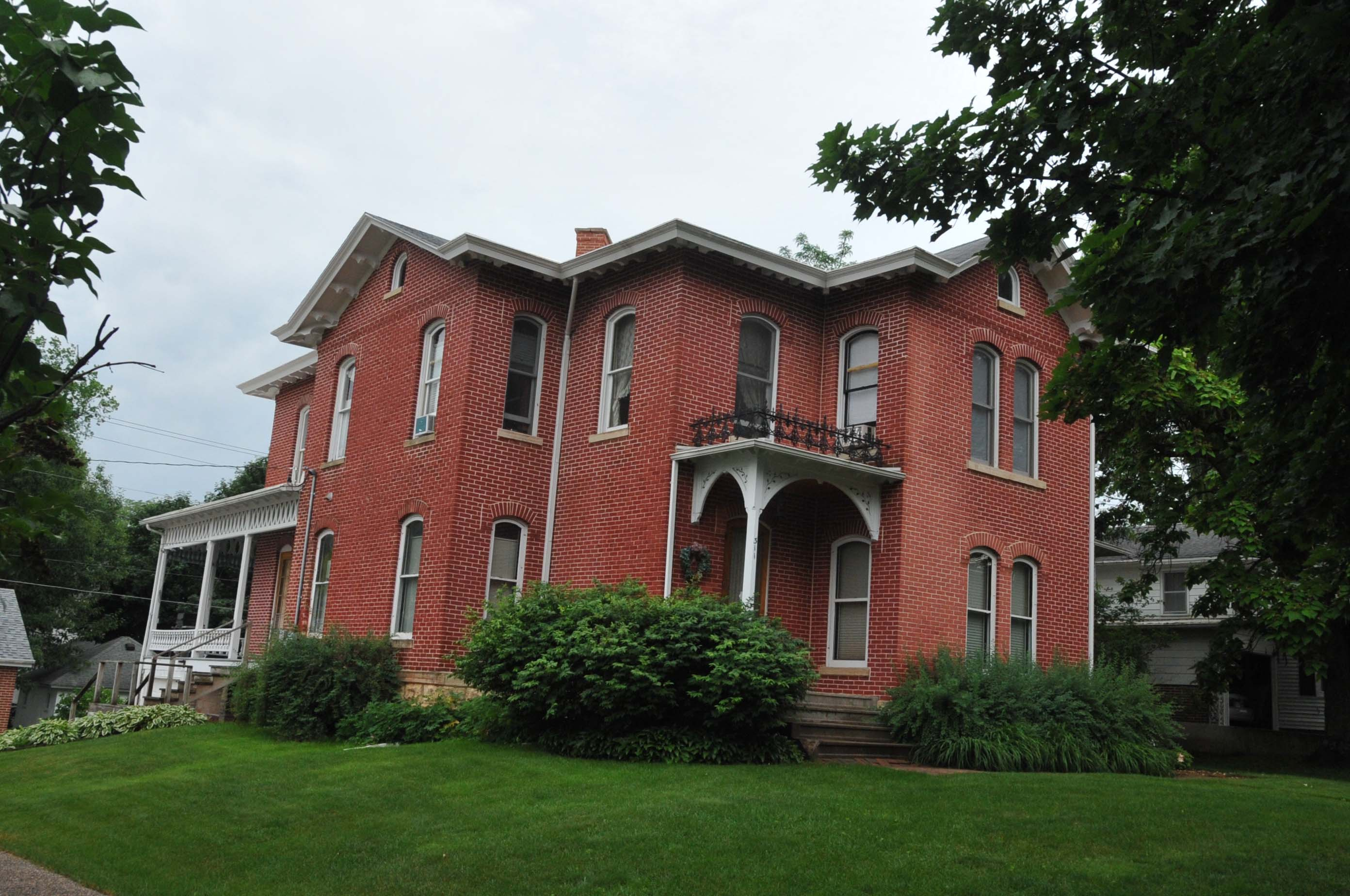

- Location within Iowa Location within the United States
- Location: 311 S. 2nd St. Maquoketa, Iowa
- Coordinates: 42°03′54″N 90°39′59″W
- Area: less than one acre
- Built: 1882
- Architectural style: Italianate
- MPS: Maquoketa MPS
- NRHP reference No.: 91000967
- Added to NRHP: December 30, 1991

The Dr. G.S. Martin House is a historic residence located in Maquoketa, Iowa, United States. It is a fine example of houses built in town for the professional class during Maquoketa's economic expansion in the late 19th century. It presents a more subdued and conservative appearance than other local Italianate homes. Built in 1882, the two-story brick house features a limestone foundation, a dressed stone water table, a low pitched hip roof, projecting low pitched gable wings, and simple brackets under the broad eaves. There are two porches on the house. The front porch is capped with iron cresting. Dr. Martin was one of the first physicians in town when he settled in here in 1857. He also worked as a druggist. The house was listed on the National Register of Historic Places in 1991.
