= James Martin (American football) =

American football coach

Biographical details
- Born: August 22, 1944
- Died: January 14, 2009 (aged 64); Huntsville, Alabama, U.S.

Playing career

Football
- c. 1965: Alabama A&M

Baseball
- c. 1965: Alabama A&M

Coaching career (HC unless noted)

Football
- 1966–1969: Davidson HS (AL)
- 1971–1983: Tuskegee (assistant)
- 1984–1992: Tuskegee

Baseball
- 1971–1982: Tuskegee
- 1984–1988: Tuskegee

Administrative career (AD unless noted)
- 1987–1993: Tuskegee
- 1993–1995: South Carolina State
- 1995–1996: LIU
- 1996–2006: Alabama A&M

Head coaching record
- Overall: 43–43–2 (college football)

James A. Martin Sr. (August 22, 1944 – January 14, 2009) was an American football and baseball coach and college athletics administrator. He was served as the head football coach at Tuskegee University in Tuskegee, Alabama for nine seasons, from 1984 to 1993, compiling a record of 43–43–2. Martin also had two stints as Tuskegee's head baseball coach, from 1971 to 1982 and 1984 to 1988, and was the school's athletic director from 1987 to 1993. He was the athletic director at South Carolina State University from 1993 to 1995, Long Island University (LIU) from 1995 to 1996, and Alabama A&M University from 1996 to 2006.

Martin was the head football coach at Davidson High School in Centreville, Alabama from 1966 to 1969. He was an assistant football coach at Tuskegee for 13 years before being promoted to head football coach.

Martin died on January 14, 2009, at Crest-wood Medical Center in Huntsville, Alabama.

== Head coaching record ==
=== College football ===
Year	Team	Overall	Conference	Standing	Bowl/playoffs	NCAA^{#}
Tuskegee Golden Tigers (Southern Intercollegiate Athletic Conference) (1984–1993)
1984	Tuskegee	1–8				
1985	Tuskegee	3–6–1	2–3–1			
1986	Tuskegee	6–3	5–2			
1987	Tuskegee	8–2	6–1	T–1st		
1988	Tuskegee	3–6	3–4	5th		
1989	Tuskegee	5–5	4–2	3rd		
1990	Tuskegee	8–3	6–1	2nd		14
1991	Tuskegee	6–4	5–2	T–1st		
1992	Tuskegee	3–6–1	2–4–1	7th		
Tuskegee:		43–43–2				
Total:		43–43–2				
National championship Conference title Conference division title or championship game berth
^{#}Rankings from NCAA Division II Football Committee poll.
