= Martin House (Cincinnati, Ohio) =

Historic house in Ohio, United States

- U.S. National Register of Historic Places
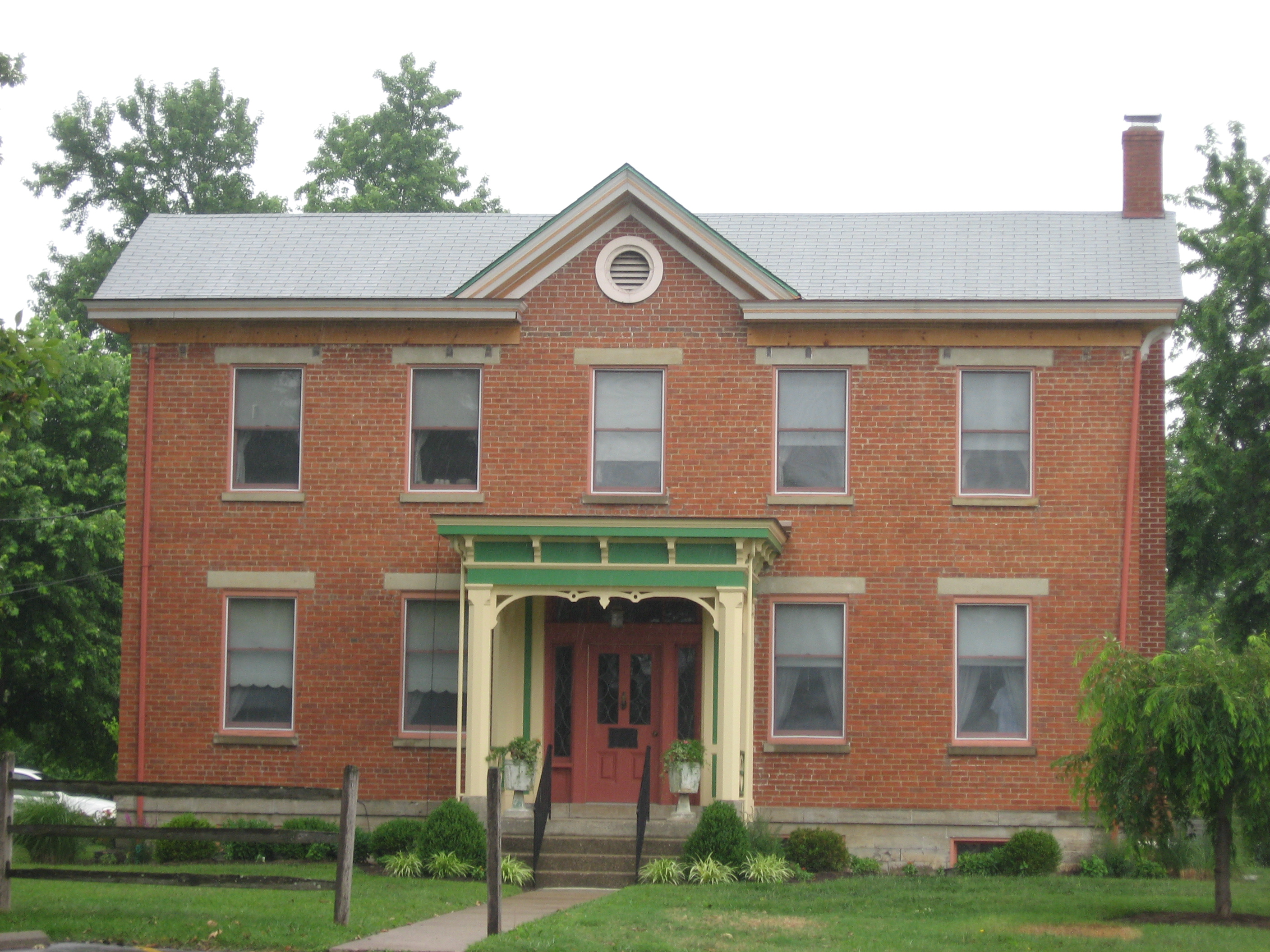
- Front of the house

- Location within Ohio Location within the United States
- Location: 6500 Beechmont Ave., Cincinnati, Ohio
- Coordinates: 39°7′50″N 84°21′31″W
- Area: Less than 1 acre (0.40 ha)
- Built: 1847
- Architectural style: Greek Revival, Federal, Transitional
- NRHP reference No.: 79001859
- Added to NRHP: March 21, 1979

The Martin House is a historic residence in the Mount Washington neighborhood of Cincinnati, Ohio, United States. Built in 1847, the house is composed of two pieces: the original section, located in the back; and the front, built in 1852. Between the two components, it features elements of the Greek Revival and Federal architectural styles. Built of brick, two stories tall, it was originally a farmhouse belonging to John C. Martin, who built his home on property owned by his father-in-law Ezekiel Rigdon, who owned nearly 100 acres (40 ha) of land on Mount Washington near the farm of one of the area's first settlers.

In 1979, the Martin House was listed on the National Register of Historic Places, because of its status as a well-preserved example of the area's architecture. By this point, the house was owned by a religious organization and was also known as the "Heritage House;" it received national recognition because it had almost never been altered after the construction of the front component, and few other houses in the area built at a similar time retained so many of their original components.
