= James Martin House (Snow Hill, Maryland) =

Historic house in Maryland, United States

- U.S. National Register of Historic Places
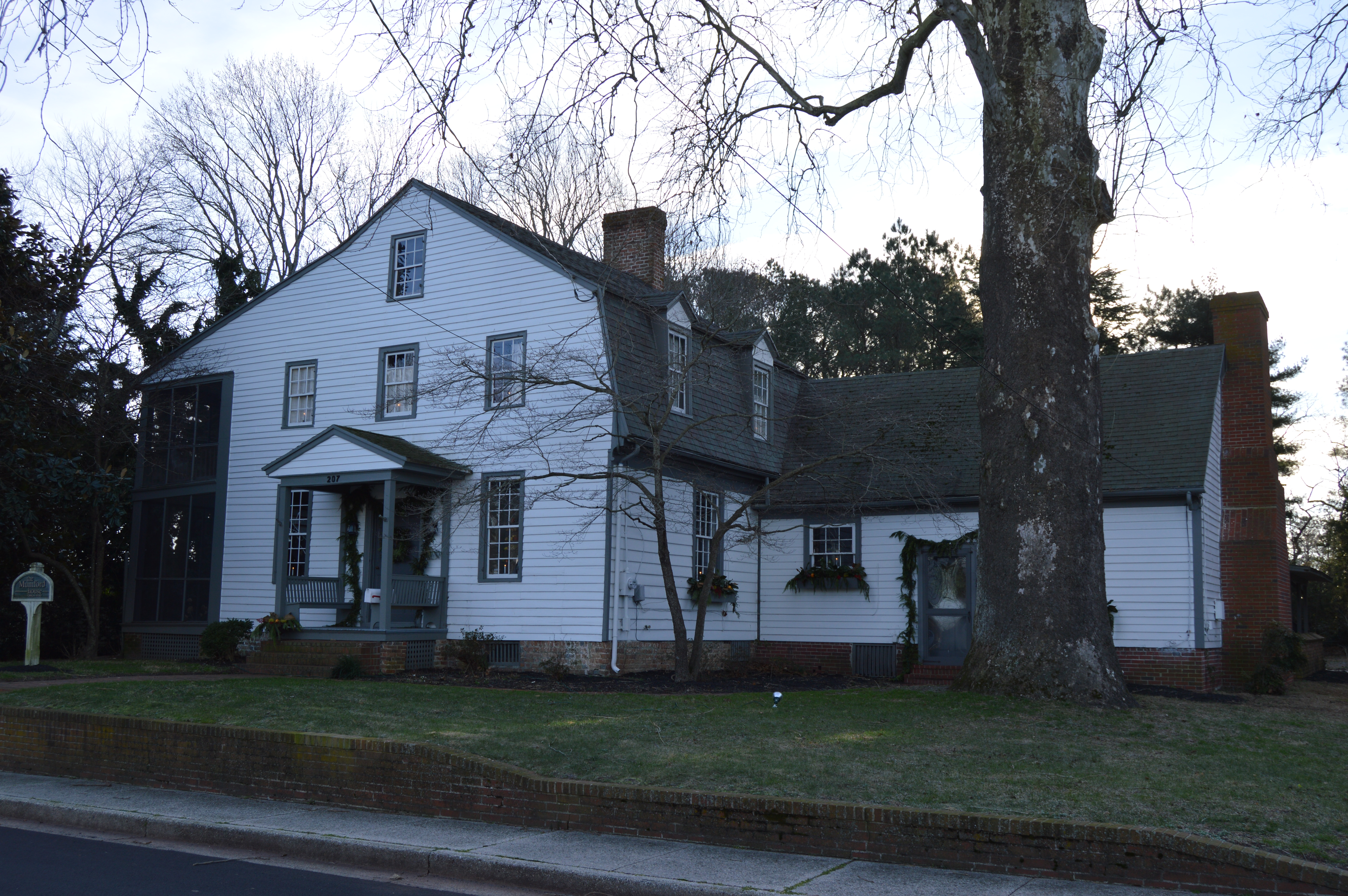
- Front of the house

- Location within Maryland Location within the United States
- Location: 207 Ironshire Street, Snow Hill, Maryland
- Coordinates: 38°10′15″N 75°23′41″W
- Area: 0.5 acres (0.20 ha)
- Built: 1790
- Architectural style: Georgian
- NRHP reference No.: 96000922
- Added to NRHP: August 22, 1996

The James Martin House, built c. 1790, is the only remaining representative of a gambrel-roof timber frame dwelling on the lower Eastern Shore of Maryland. Two other buildings of similar form, Pemberton Hall and Bryan's Manor are brick buildings. The interior retains much of its original raised-panel woodwork.

It was listed on the National Register of Historic Places in 1996.
