= James Martin House (Florence, Alabama) =

- U.S. National Register of Historic Places
- Alabama Register of Landmarks and Heritage
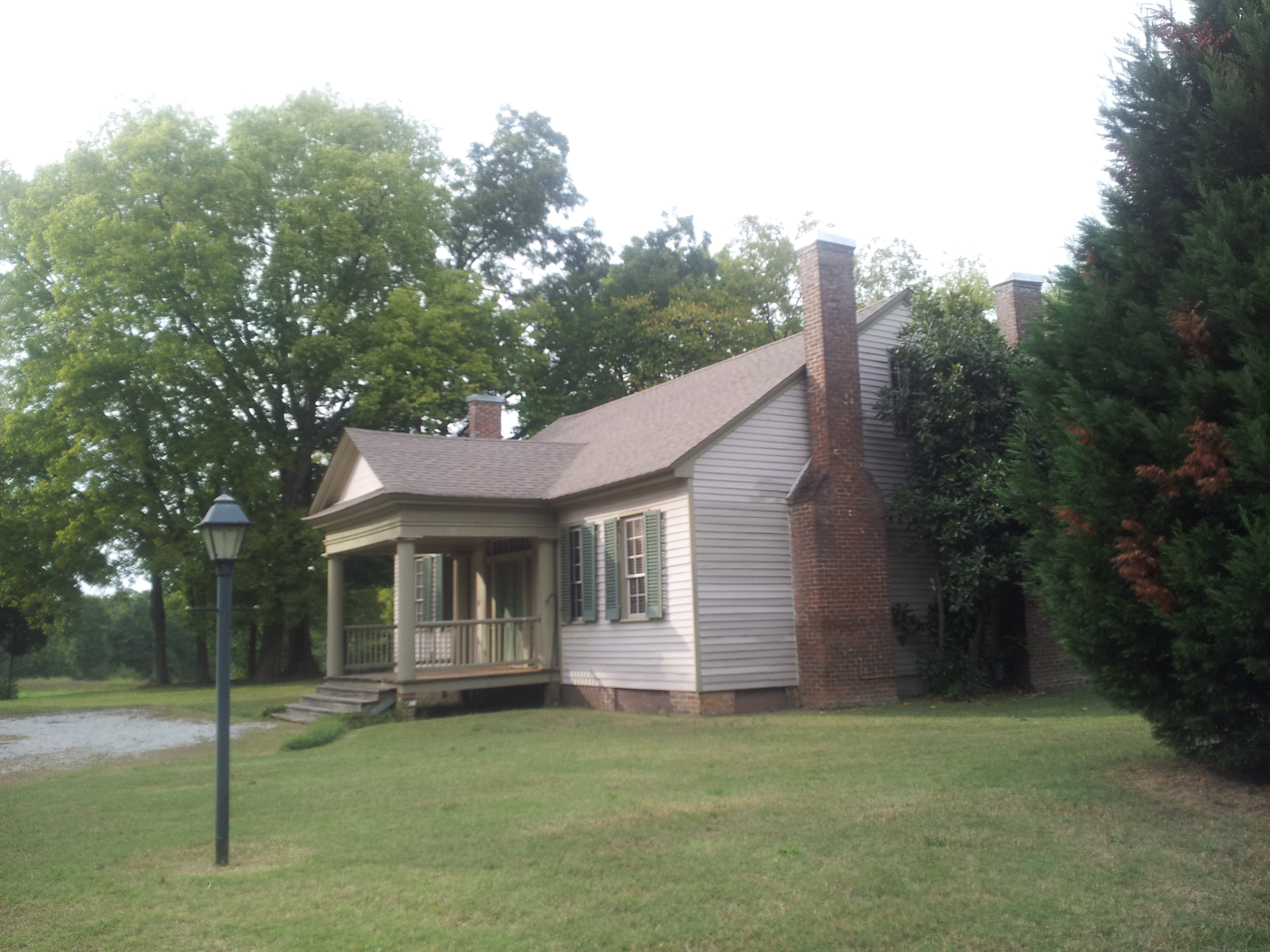
- James Martin House in 2012

- Location within Alabama Location within the United States
- Location: 1400 Cypress Mill Rd., Florence, Alabama
- Coordinates: 34°48′56″N 87°42′12″W
- Area: 0.7 acres (0.28 ha)
- Built: 1843
- Architect: James Martin
- Architectural style: Federal, Greek Revival
- NRHP reference No.: 81000128

Significant dates
- Added to NRHP: December 9, 1981
- Designated ARLH: October 19, 1979

The James Martin House (also known as the Martin-Bounds House) is a historic residence in Florence, Alabama. Martin was a leading Florence industrialist of the Antebellum era, who owned a cotton spinning mill along Cypress Creek. He had come to Florence from Jefferson County, Kentucky, and established his mill in 1839. A fire destroyed the complex in 1844, but was rebuilt and reopened in 1850. The mill was destroyed during the Civil War, but not rebuilt before Martin's death in 1869. Martin's sons operated the mill until 1873, and owned the house until 1879. It was purchased in 1886 by John Bounds, and remained in his family until 1974.

The original block of the house is five bays wide, with a small pedimented porch covering the double front door, which is surrounded by a transom and sidelights. A pair of nine-over-six sash windows flank the porch on either side. An addition was built on the left side of the façade in the mid-19th century, adding a hallway and two rooms to the center-hall plan layout. A wing to the rear of the house was originally attached via an open breezeway which was later enclosed. The entire house has Federal-style woodwork with some Greek Revival details, such as fluted Doric columns and pilasters on the front porch.

The house was listed on the Alabama Register of Landmarks and Heritage in 1979 and the National Register of Historic Places in 1981.
