= William Martin House (Brentwood, Tennessee) =

Historic house in Tennessee, United States

- U.S. National Register of Historic Places
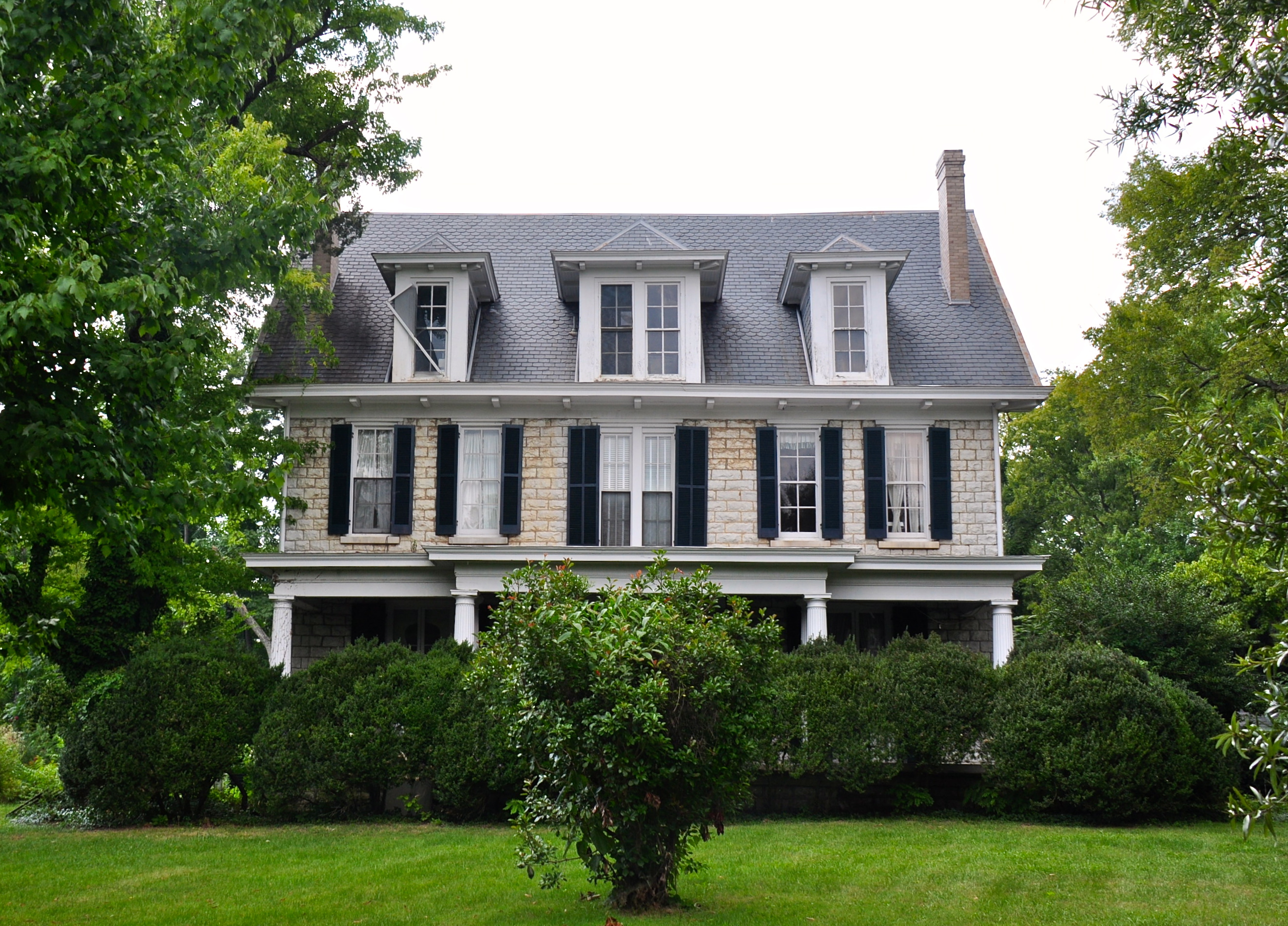
- William Martin House, August 2014.

- Location within Tennessee Location within the United States
- Location: 5215 Seward Rd., Brentwood, Tennessee
- Coordinates: 36°1′34″N 86°48′23″W
- Area: 1.7 acres (0.69 ha)
- Built: c.1850
- Architectural style: Colonial Revival
- MPS: Williamson County MRA
- NRHP reference No.: 88000334
- Added to NRHP: April 13, 1988

The William Martin House is a building and property in Brentwood, Tennessee, United States, that dates from c. 1910 and was listed on the National Register of Historic Places (NRHP) in 1988. It has also been known as Boxwood Hall. It is a two-story house that was built c. 1850 but was extensively remodeled into Colonial Revival style in c. 1910. The NRHP listing was for two contributing buildings on an area of 1.7 acres (0.69 ha). The NRHP eligibility of the property was covered in a 1988 study of Williamson County historical resources.
