= Micajah Martin Farm =

Historic house in New Hampshire, United States

- U.S. National Register of Historic Places
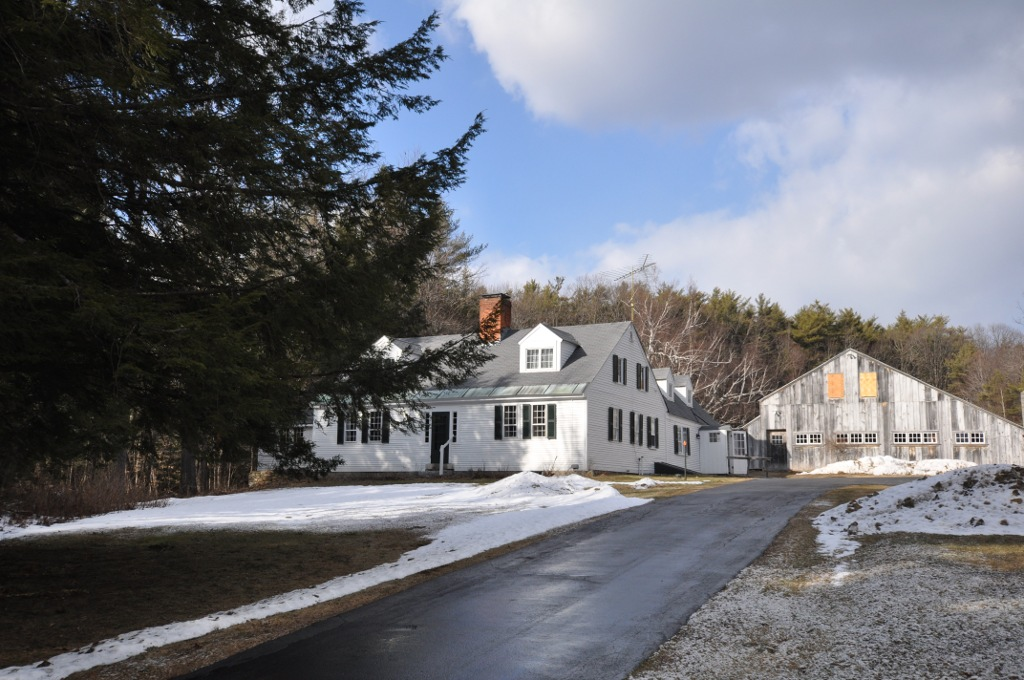

- Location within New Hampshire Location within the United States
- Location: Old Peterborough Rd., Dublin, New Hampshire
- Coordinates: 42°53′44″N 72°0′44″W
- Area: 4.9 acres (2.0 ha)
- Built: 1802
- Built by: Micajah Martin
- Architectural style: Cape Colonial
- MPS: Dublin MRA
- NRHP reference No.: 83004047
- Added to NRHP: December 18, 1983

The Micajah Martin House is a historic house on Old Peterborough Road in Dublin, New Hampshire. Built about 1802, it is a well-preserved local example of an early Cape-style farmhouse. The house was listed on the National Register of Historic Places in 1983.

== Description and history ==
The Micajah Martin House stands in a rural setting in eastern Dublin, at the western end of Old Peterborough Road near its junction with New Hampshire Route 101. It is a 1 1/2-story timber-frame structure, with a gabled roof, clapboarded exterior, and large central chimney. Its main facade is five bays wide, with a center entrance that is framed by sidelight windows. A series of ells extend to the rear, joining the house to a barn. Gabled dormers, also a later addition, project from the front roof face.

The house was built about 1802, probably by Micajah Martin, replacing the log house that was the first on the property, and is typical of the farmhouses built in Dublin in that period. It has retained its original fireplace and beehive oven, and features wooden paneling recovered from a now-demolished house of the same period. The house was bought by historian Frederick Lewis Weis in 1951, and was still in that family when it was listed on the National Register in 1983.

== See also ==
- National Register of Historic Places listings in Cheshire County, New Hampshire
