= James Stewart Martin (author) =

American Department of Justice attorney and author (1911–1987)

James Stewart Martin (December 10, 1911 – January 30, 1987) was a United States Department of Justice attorney who served as the Chief of the Decartelization Branch for Military Government in Germany after World War II.

Martin was born in Pittsburgh, Pennsylvania on December 10, 1911.

His book All Honorable Men was published by Little Brown in 1950. In it, Martin catalogs the difficulties faced by his team trying to deconstruct the Nazi industrial machine, not the least of which was opposition to his efforts by his superior officer, an investment banker in peacetime. In the book, Martin blamed Wall Street's pre-war ties to German Big Business for obstructionist efforts among the Allied powers to prevent the breakup of German industrial power.

Martin was also Maryland state chairman of the Progressive Party.

During the 1970s, Martin lived in Downers Grove, Illinois, before relocating to Clearwater, Florida. He died there on January 30, 1987, at the age of 75.
