= James Slattin Martin Jr. =

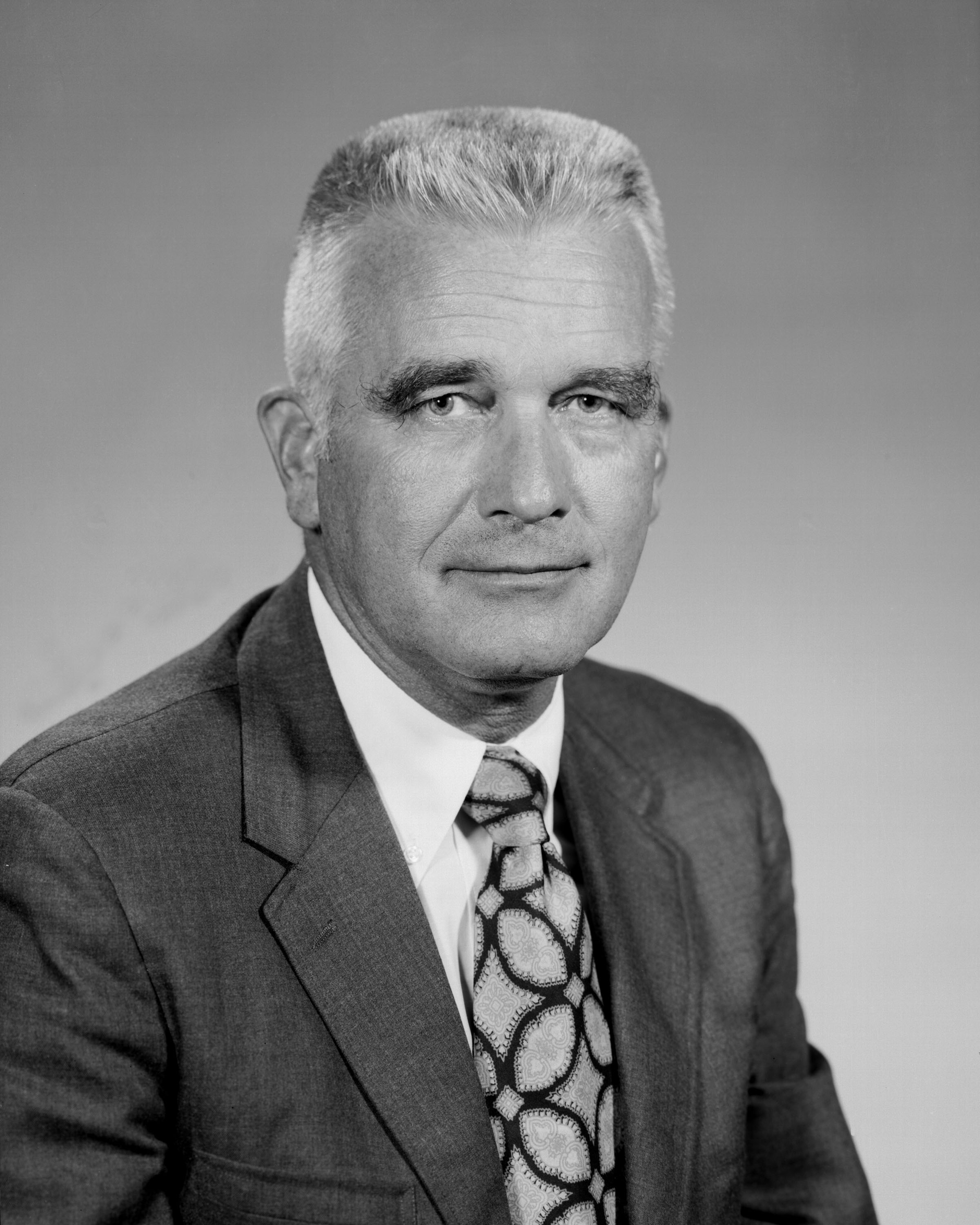
- Born: June 21, 1920; Washington, D.C.
- Died: April 14, 2002 (aged 81); Rising Sun, Maryland
- Education: University of Michigan
- Occupation: Project manager of the Viking program
- Years active: 1964–2002

James Slattin Martin Jr. (June 21, 1920 – April 14, 2002) was project manager for the Viking program.

== Biography ==
Martin was born in Washington, D.C., on June 21, 1920. He earned a bachelor's degree in aeronautical engineering from the University of Michigan in 1942. He later completed the Harvard Graduate School of Business Middle Management Program. From 1942 to 1964, he worked for Republic Aviation Corporation, assuming greater responsibility first as assistant chief technical engineer, then chief research engineers and, finally, as manager of space systems requirements.

Martin joined NASA’s Langley Research Center in September 1964 as assistant project manager for Lunar Orbiter. The five successful Lunar Orbiter missions provided significant new information about the Moon’s surface and a wealth of photographic detail that stood as the definitive source of lunar surface information for years. In recognition of his contribution to this project, Martin was awarded the NASA Exceptional Service Medal in 1967.

On June 23, 1967, Langley Director Floyd Thompson announced the appointment of James S. Martin, Jr., as manager of the capsule bus system, thereby forming a project management organization to control all Voyager-related activities at Langley. This role migrated to project manager for NASA's Viking program for landing and orbiting Mars (1975–1982).

As Viking 1 landed on Mars, Martin hung up on a call from President Ford, telling him that he was "busy right now" and to call back in three hours. The President called back three hours later at which time Martin, along with then-NASA Administrator Jim Fletcher, briefed him on the landing.

Martin left NASA in 1976 to become vice president of advanced programs and planning, for Martin Marietta Aerospace, Bethesda, MD. He retired in 1985, but in 2000, NASA called him out of retirement to help restructure the space agency's Mars program after the 1999 failures of the Mars Climate Orbiter and Mars Polar Lander missions.

He died April 14, 2002, after a long battle with cancer.
