= James Stewart Martin (politician) =

American politician

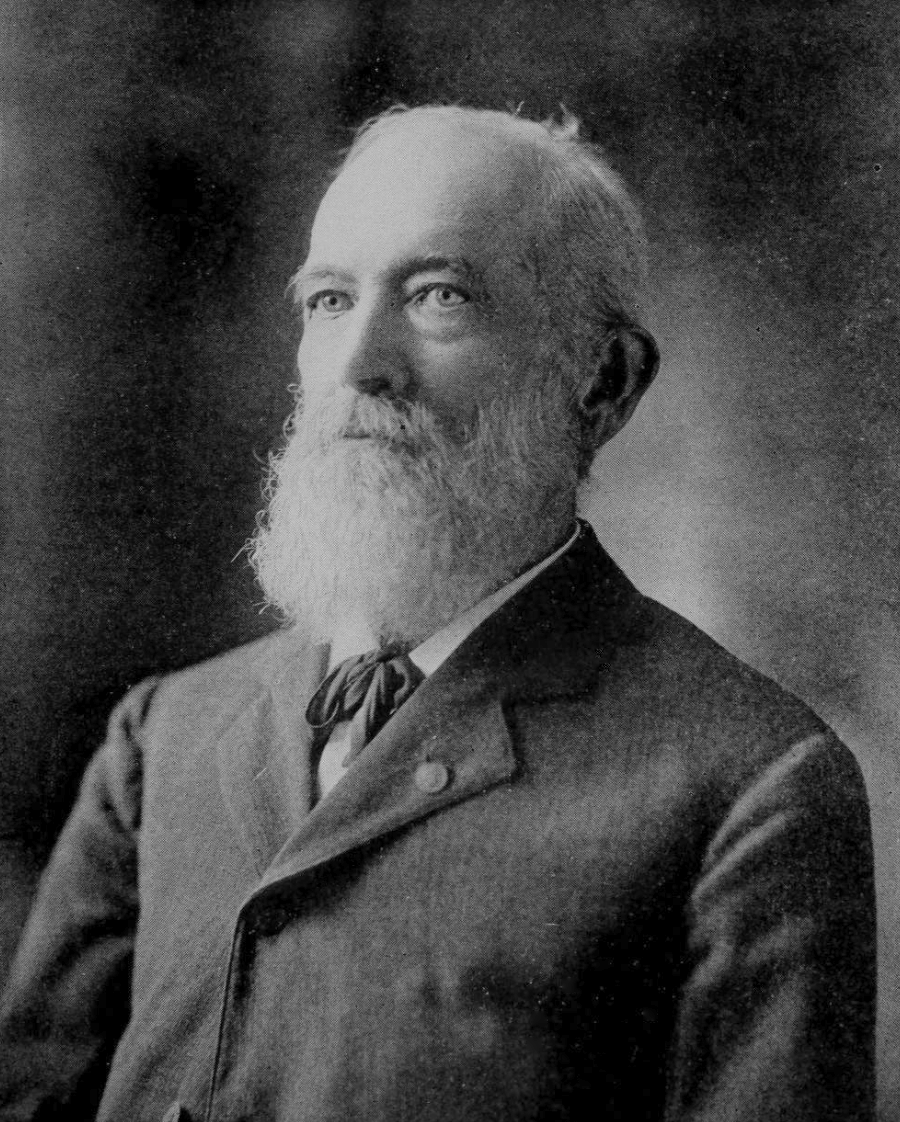

Member of the U.S. House of Representatives from Illinois's 16th district
- In office March 4, 1873 – March 3, 1875
- Preceded by: District created
- Succeeded by: William A. J. Sparks

Personal details
- Born: August 19, 1826 Gate City, Virginia, U.S.
- Died: November 20, 1907 (aged 81) Salem, Illinois, U.S.
- Party: Republican
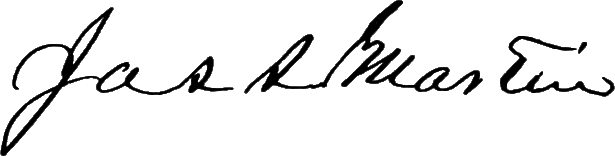
- Signature

James Stewart Martin (August 19, 1826 – November 20, 1907) was a U.S. Representative from Illinois.

== Biography ==
Martin was born in Estillville (now Gate City), Scott County, Virginia, the son of John S. Martin and Melinda Morison. His father's second wife was Nancy Brownlow, making him a step-nephew of radical Tennessee governor William "Parson" Brownlow. He attended the common schools and Emory and Henry College in Emory, Virginia. He moved to Salem, Illinois, in 1846. He served during the Mexican–American War in Company C of the 1st Regiment of Illinois Volunteers. Afterwards he studied law, was admitted to the bar in 1861 and commenced practice in Salem, Illinois; becoming a clerk of the Marion County Court.

During the Civil War Martin served in the Union Army and was commissioned colonel of the 111th Illinois Volunteer Infantry Regiment on September 18, 1862. He was brevetted brigadier general on February 26, 1865 and then honorably mustered out on June 7. After the war Martin served as judge of Marion County Court. He was appointed as United States pension agent by President Grant on April 13, 1869.

Martin was elected as a Republican to the Forty-third Congress (March 4, 1873 – March 3, 1875), defeating Silas L. Bryan, the father of William Jennings Bryan, by a vote of 12,266 to 12,016. He was an unsuccessful candidate for re-election and then became commissioner of the Southern Illinois Penitentiary at Menard in 1879.

Martin died in Salem, Illinois on November 20, 1907. He was interred in East Lawn Cemetery.

U.S. House of Representatives
Preceded by District created	Member of the U.S. House of Representatives from Illinois's 16th congressional district 1873-1875	Succeeded by William A. J. Sparks
