= William H. Martin House =

Historic house in Arkansas, United States

- U.S. National Register of Historic Places
- U.S. Historic district – Contributing property
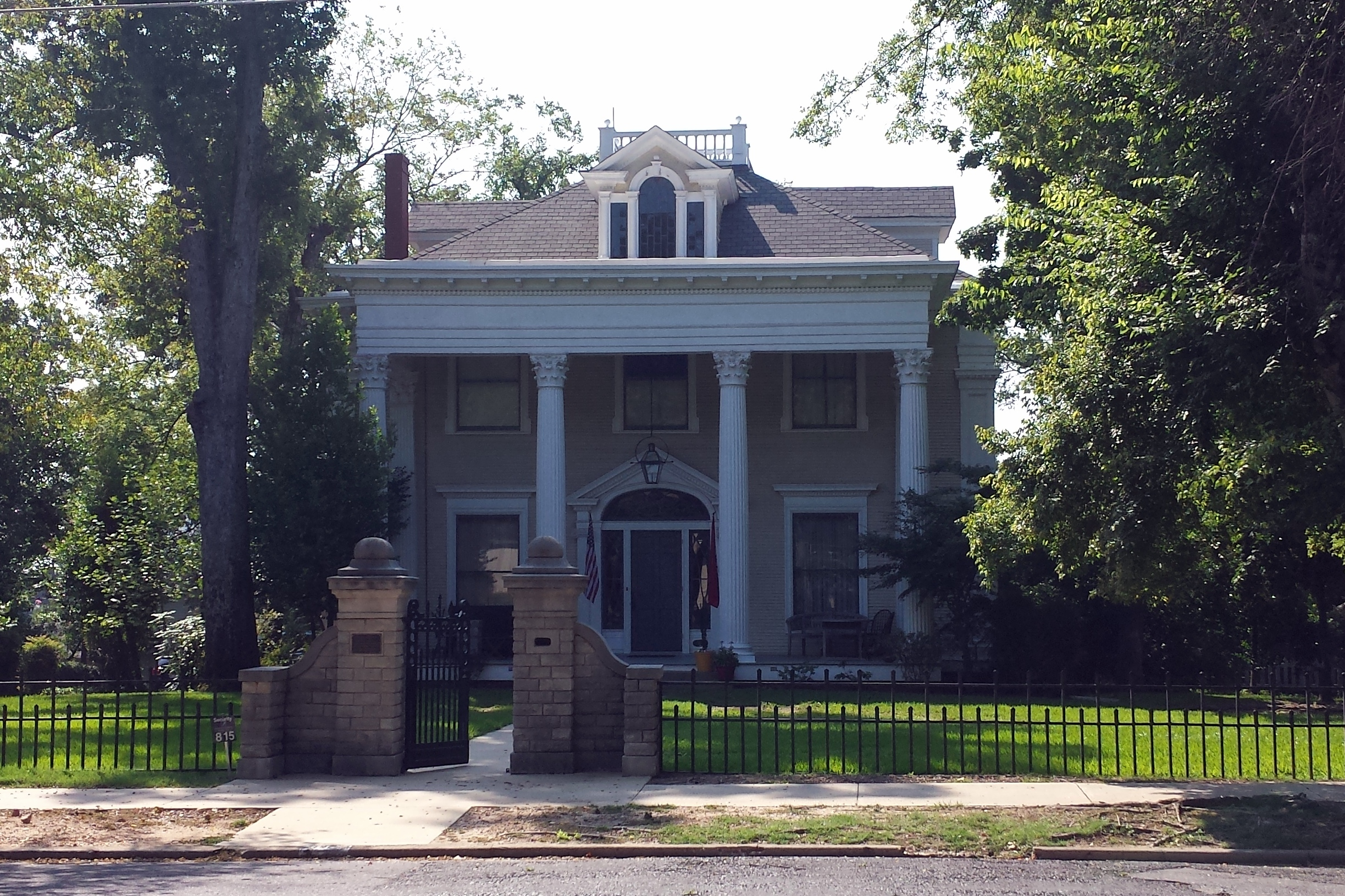

- Location within Arkansas Location within the United States
- Location: 815 Quapaw Ave., Hot Springs, Arkansas
- Coordinates: 34°30′15″N 93°3′47″W
- Built: 1904
- Architect: Frank W. Gibb
- Architectural style: Colonial Revival, Classical Revival
- Part of: Quapaw-Prospect Historic District (ID99000821)
- NRHP reference No.: 86001320

Significant dates
- Added to NRHP: June 11, 1986
- Designated: March 8, 2002

The William H. Martin House is a historic house at 815 Quapaw Avenue in Hot Springs, Arkansas, USA. It was designed by the architect Frank W. Gibb in 1904 and built in the same year. It includes Colonial Revival and Classical Revival architectural elements. It is an imposing building with a two-story Greek temple portico supported by four fluted Corinthian style pillars. The portico's cornice is modillioned with scrolled brackets, and has a band of dentil molding. When built, the house was on the outskirts of Hot Springs.

The house was listed on the National Register of Historic Places in 1986.

== See also ==
- National Register of Historic Places listings in Garland County, Arkansas
