= Dogface butterfly =

Dogface butterfly or Dogface butterflies may refer to:

- Zerene, a genus of butterflies commonly known as the Dogfaces
- Zerene cesonia, a butterfly in this genus commonly known as the Dogface or Southern Dogface
