= C29H36O4 =

The molecular formula C_{29}H_{36}O_{4} (molar mass: 448.59 g/mol, exact mass: 448.2614 u) may refer to:

- Algestone acetophenide, or dihydroxyprogesterone acetophenide (DHPA)
- Pawhuskin A
