= Amorpha apiculata =

Baja California false-indigo

Scientific classification
- Kingdom: Plantae
- Clade: Tracheophytes
- Clade: Angiosperms
- Clade: Eudicots
- Clade: Rosids
- Order: Fabales
- Family: Fabaceae
- Subfamily: Faboideae
- Genus: Amorpha
- Species: A. apiculata

Binomial name
- Amorpha apiculata Wiggins, 1933

Species of legume

Amorpha apiculata is a species of papilionate leguminous shrub known commonly as the Baja California false-indigo. It is a very rare narrow endemic only found in the Sierra de San Pedro Mártir and its western foothills. It is characterized by a white vexillum, a smooth, hairless fruit and spine-like glands. It is closely related to Amorpha californica.

== Description ==
This plant is an erect, slender shrub that grows 2 to 5 m tall. On the petioles and rachises of the leaves are spine-like glands. The leaves appear in an ascendant to spreading manner, and are 10 to 20 cm long. The petioles are 1 to 2.5 cm long, and are usually equal to or longer than the width of the lowermost leaflet, with several to numerous of the amber-colored glands. There are 13 to 19 leaflets, each shaped elliptic to oblong-elliptic, mostly 1.5 to 3 cm long and 1 to 1.5 cm wide, and are usually 2.2 to 3.3 times as long as they are wide. The petiolules, which are the stalks that hold the leaflets, are 1.5 to 2.2 mm long.

There are 1 to 7 racemes, which are 10 to 30 cm long. The pedicels are 0.8 to 1.2 mm long. The bracts are shaped narrowly linear, and are 2.5 to 3 mm long. The calyx tube is shaped narrowly funnelform, 2.5 to 3 mm long. The vexillum is 5 to 7 mm long, and about 4 mm wide, broadly ovate and colored white. The fruits are about 6 mm long to 2.5 mm wide, and are mostly smooth and free of hair.

== Taxonomy ==
This species was described by Ira Loren Wiggins in 1933. Botanist Robert L. Wilbur notes similarities to Amorpha californica, as they overlap in range, although he states that both species can be distinguished each other based on vegetative or reproductive characteristics, such as the hairless fruit, white vexillum, and the longer filaments on A. apiculata. Molecular phylogenetics has supported their close relationship, with A. californica and A. apiculata creating a well-supported clade. The A. californica and A. apiculata clade appears to be the earliest diverging in the genus.

== Distribution ==
This species is one of the rarest species of Amorpha, and is only endemic to the Sierra de San Pedro Mártir and its foothills west to San Quintin.
