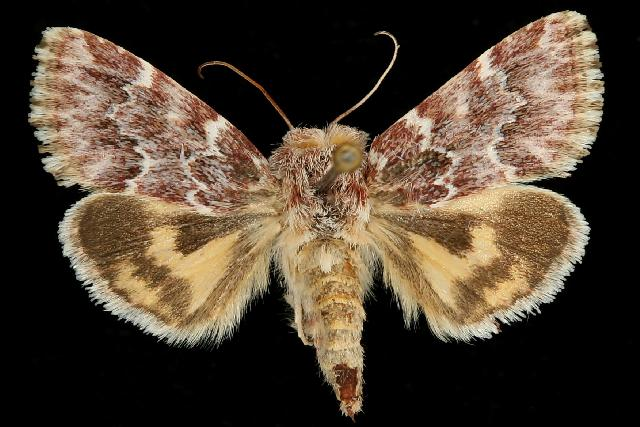

Scientific classification
- Kingdom: Animalia
- Phylum: Arthropoda
- Clade: Pancrustacea
- Class: Insecta
- Order: Lepidoptera
- Superfamily: Noctuoidea
- Family: Noctuidae
- Genus: Schinia
- Species: S. lucens

Binomial name
- Schinia lucens Morrison, 1875

= Schinia lucens =

Species of moth

Schinia lucens, the leadplant flower moth or false indigo flower moth, is a moth of the family Noctuidae. It is mottled pink and hard to miss. The species was first described by Herbert Knowles Morrison in 1875. It is found in the central and western United States.

The wingspan is about 25–28 mm. There is one generation per year.

The larvae feed on Amorpha species, especially A. canescens, where it is well-camouflaged.
