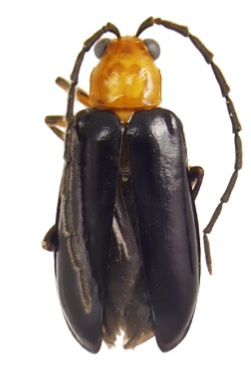

Scientific classification
- Kingdom: Animalia
- Phylum: Arthropoda
- Clade: Pancrustacea
- Class: Insecta
- Order: Coleoptera
- Suborder: Polyphaga
- Infraorder: Cucujiformia
- Family: Chrysomelidae
- Genus: Phyllecthris
- Species: P. dorsalis

Binomial name
- Phyllecthris dorsalis (Olivier, 1808)

Synonyms
- Galleruca dorsalis Olivier, 1808

= Phyllecthris dorsalis =

Species of beetle

Phyllecthris dorsalis is a species of leaf beetle in the family Chrysomelidae. It is found in North America, where it has been recorded from the eastern United States.

== Biology ==
Recorded foodplants are Fabaceae species, such as Amorpha and Desmodium species.
