= Amorpha fruticosa 'Pendula' =

Shrub cultivar

- Genus: Amorpha
- Species: Amorpha fruticosa
- Cultivar: 'Pendula'
- Origin: France

Amorpha fruticosa 'Pendula', or Weeping Desert False Indigo, was a weeping shrub and a cultivar of Amorpha fruticosa, the Desert False Indigo. It was first described in 1868 by Élie-Abel Carrière from France. No trees are known to survive of this cultivar. Apart from the clone found in France it also seems to have been reported from the wild in Florida.

== Description ==
A large shrub with arching branches forming a dome shape.

== Accessions ==
This cultivar never seems to have been widely cultivated and no specimens could be traced. The last recorded specimen from Rostock Botanic Garden, Germany died in 2005. It is however possible that specimens still survive in the wild.

== Synonymy ==
- Amorpha pendula Carrière (1868)
