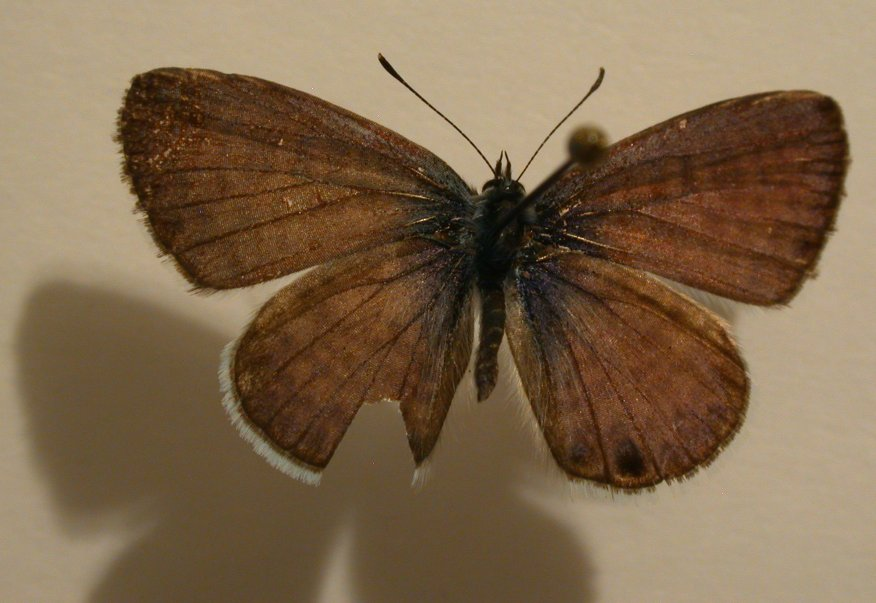

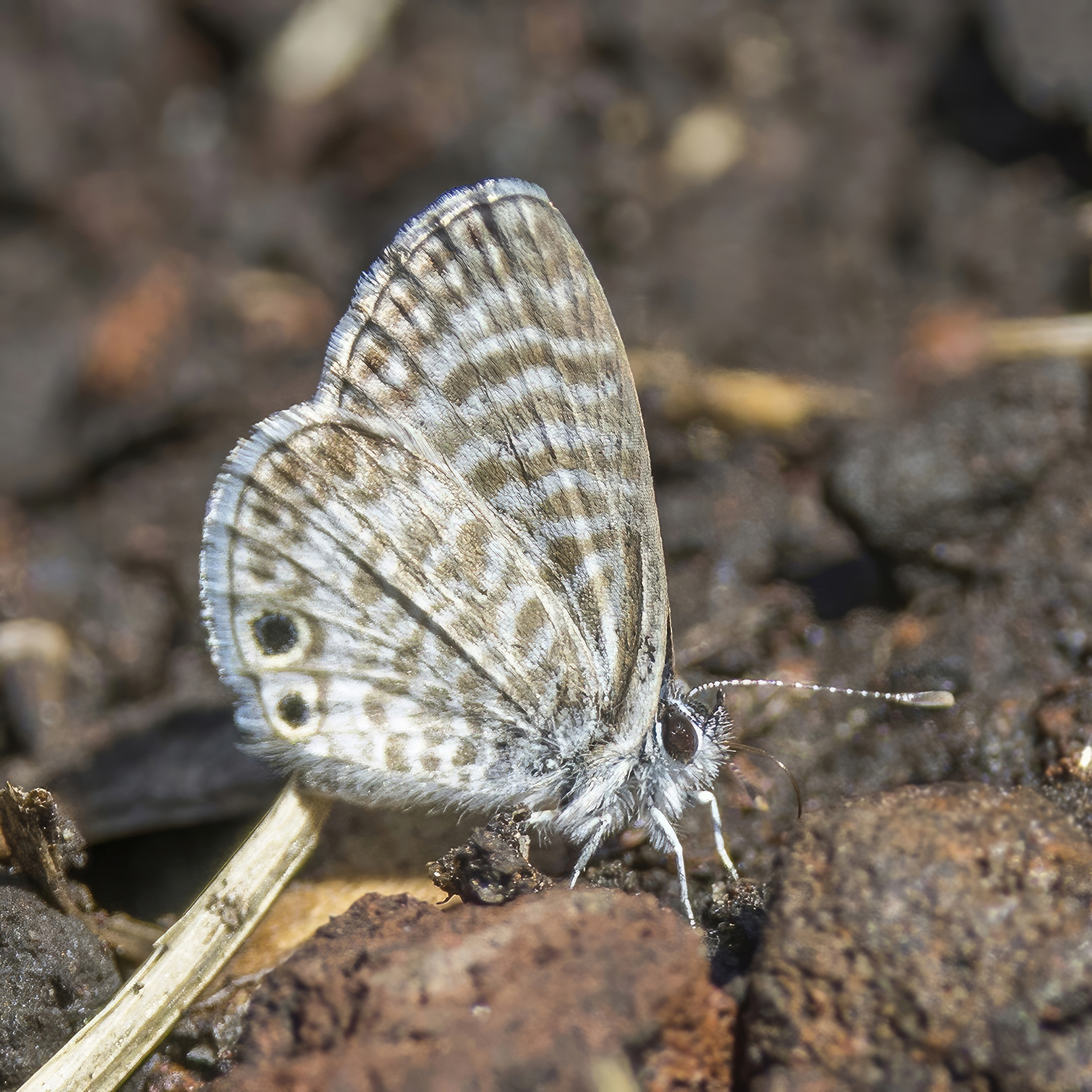

Scientific classification
- Domain: Eukaryota
- Kingdom: Animalia
- Phylum: Arthropoda
- Class: Insecta
- Order: Lepidoptera
- Family: Lycaenidae
- Genus: Leptotes
- Species: L. marina

Binomial name
- Leptotes marina (Reakirt, 1868)

Synonyms
- Lycaena marina; Leptotes burdicki

= Leptotes marina =

Species of butterfly

Leptotes marina, the marine blue or striped blue, is a butterfly of the family Lycaenidae. It is found in North America and Central America.

== Description ==
The wingspan is 22–29 mm. The upperside is blue, underside is marked by brown bands with two blue spots on the hind wings. Adults are on wing from April to September in the north and all year round in south. Its habitats include weedy, open sites and deserts.

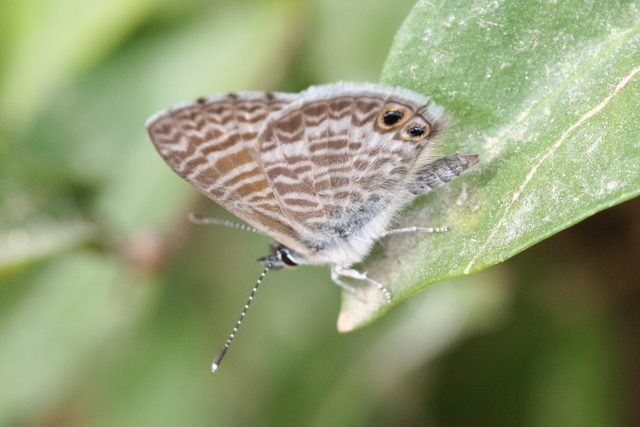

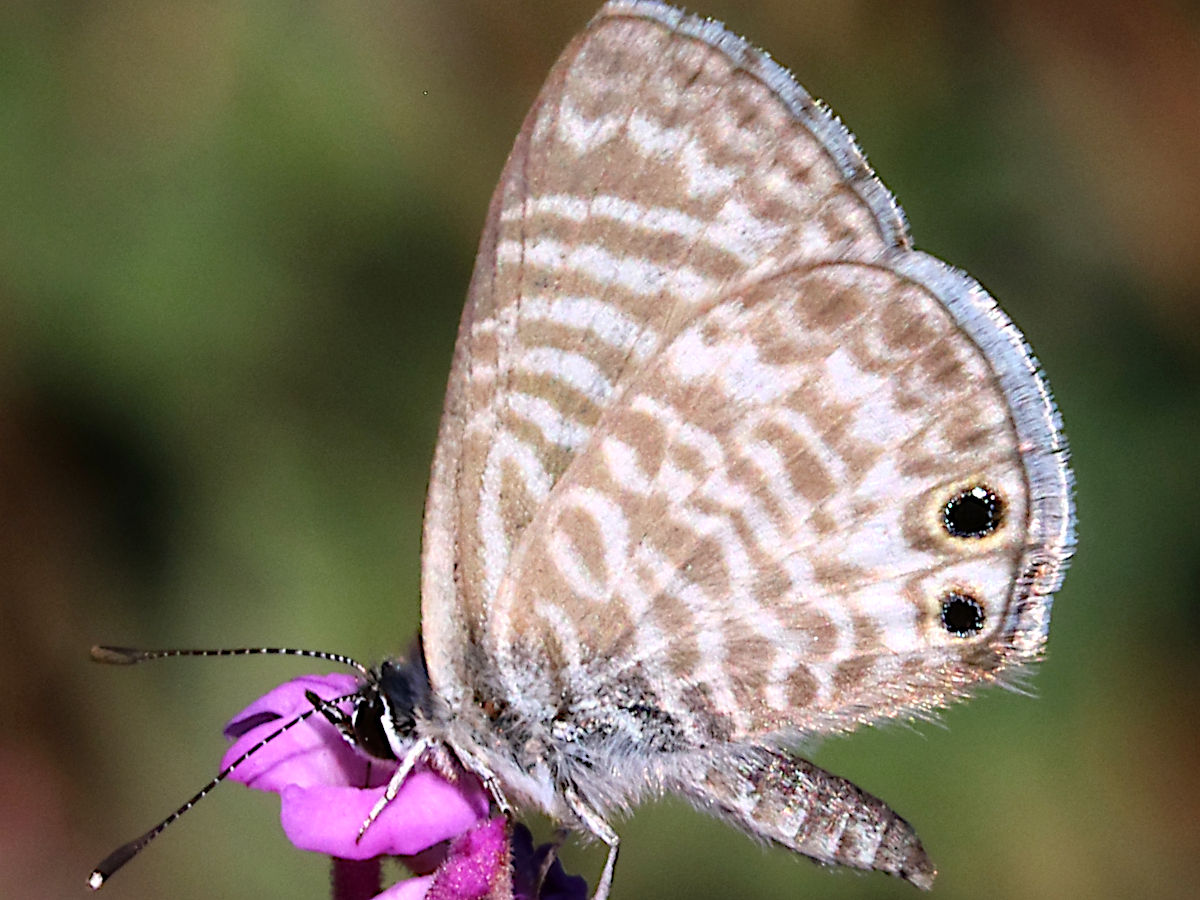
at Montebello, California

== Ecology ==
The larvae feed on Astragalus, Amorpha californica, Acacia greggii, Dalea purpurea, Dolichos lablab, Galactia, Glycyrrhiza lepidota, Prosopis glandulosa, Lysiloma thornberi, Lathyrus odoratus, Medicago sativa, Lotus scoparius dendroides, Phaseolus, Wisteria sinensis and Plumbago.

Larvae are also associated with introduced Iridomyrmex humilis (Argentine ants).
