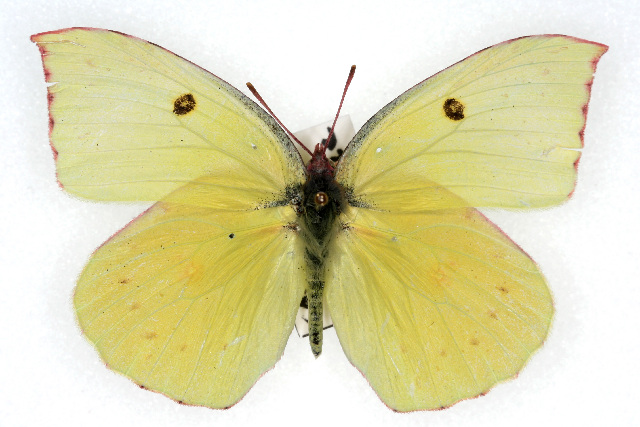
- Female
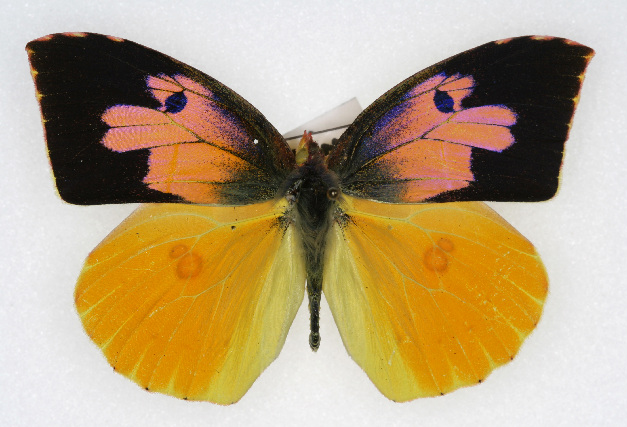
- Male

Conservation status
- Apparently Secure (NatureServe)

Scientific classification
- Kingdom: Animalia
- Phylum: Arthropoda
- Clade: Pancrustacea
- Class: Insecta
- Order: Lepidoptera
- Family: Pieridae
- Genus: Zerene
- Species: Z. eurydice

Binomial name
- Zerene eurydice (Boisduval, 1855)

Synonyms
- Colias eurydice Boisduval, 1855

= Zerene eurydice =

California dogface butterfly

Species of butterfly

Zerene eurydice, the California dogface butterfly, belongs to the family Pieridae and is a sister genus to Colias. The Zerene eurydice and the Colias both share the "characteristic of having yellow-orange and black wing coordination." Additionally the,"Colias and Zerene eurydice males have bright UV patterns on their wings." There are only two species of the Zerene, the Zerene eurydice, and the Zerene cesonia, also known as the Southern dogface. A study that collected mitochondrial DNA from various Colias butterfly species found that Z. eurydice had decreased divergence from the ingroup, highlighting how closely related these two genera are. This species is endemic to California, and is California's state insect. The California dogface butterfly varies in its wing color and pattern.

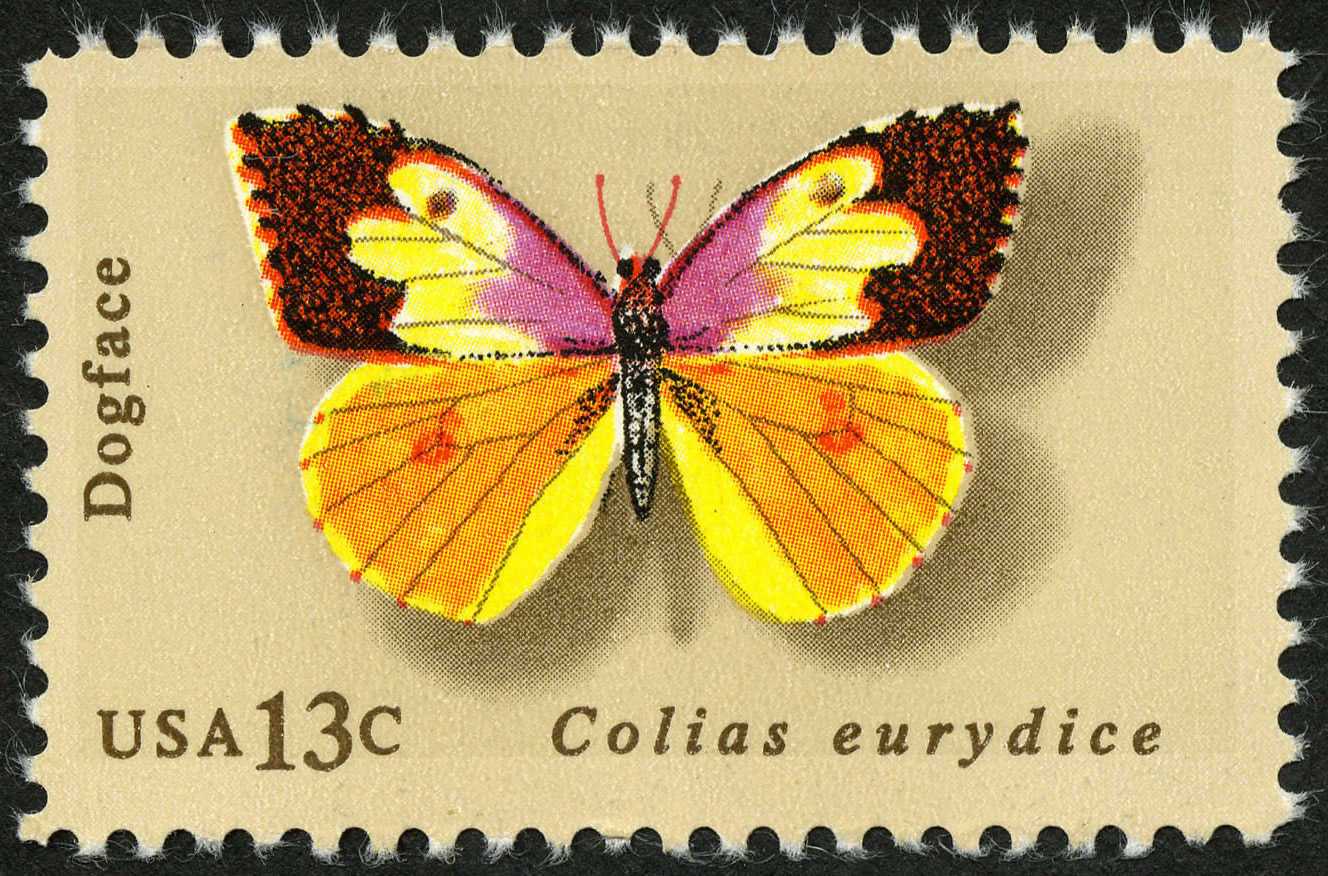
On a stamp

== Description ==
The California dogface butterfly gained its name as a result of the coloring of the wings of the butterfly, especially in the males. "The Zerene eurydice only has UV patterns on its dorsal forewings." The female mostly has yellow wings, with two black dots or dashes on each forewing, while the male has black on the outer edges of the forewing, usually enclosing a yellow-orange color and two black dots. Male Z. Eurydice butterflies have an iridescent pigment found in their dorsal forewings due to light reflecting chitin structures and this has been associated with mating success. The wing span of Zerene Eurydice measures on average 5.1 to 6.3 cm. The wings are covered with scales to assist "flight aerodynamics and heat insulation" and the overall body contains "setae hairs that sense vibration and touch."

== Distribution, feeding and habitat ==
Z. eurydice's distribution is limited to that of California and is commonly found in the San Bernardino mountains and Santa Ana Mountains in Southern California. The Zerene's habitat is found in "foothills, chaparral, oak or coniferous woodlands." Within these regions, the habitat is temperate and terrestrial.

Larvae of Z. eurydice exclusively feed on Amorpha californica, and Amorpha fruticosa, which belong to the family Fabaceae. These host plants are found within, "poison oak, willow, and near streambanks. During the larva and pupal stages, the Zerene eurydice are greenish yellow(same colors as family Fabaceae), and depend on Amorpha californica and Amorpha fruitcosa for camouflaging from predators. These butterflies fly very fast, and are difficult to approach unless they are nectaring at flowers. As a result, it is a challenge to get a photograph of them with their wings open. This fast flight aids Z. eurydice in escaping from predators such as: "ants, spiders, wasps, parasitic wasps, parasitic flies, birds, rats, toads, lizards, praying mantis, and snakes." Adult butterflies are attracted to regions with moist soils and feed on several species of flowers. It has been found that they are especially fond of blue gilia, sunflowers and thistle blooms.

The breeding season for Zerene eurydice is between early spring and late summer, with an average of hundred eggs per season. Z. Eurydice butterflies usually begin their flights around 7 a.m. and fly until the afternoon. This is not continuous and the butterflies will often roost in bushes. The females usually depart in flight an hour or two after the males.

== First state insect ==
The California dogface butterfly has been the state insect of the U.S. state of California since 1972. Its endemic range is limited to the state. California was the first state to choose a state insect—and thus, to choose a butterfly—though most of the other states have now followed, and many even have both a state insect and state butterfly. It took 43 years, a determined 4th grade class, and Fresno Assemblyman Kenneth Maddy to have the California Dogface butterfly designated as the state insect.

== Threats ==
Threats towards the species Zerene eurydice include, "fire suppression which results in closure of habitat openings and may result in eventual overly intense fires that could eradicate populations." Zerene eurydice are also locally threatened by livestock grazing. For global status-most recently updated in 2019-classifies Zerene eurydice as G4, indicating "apparently secure." The reasons behind Zerene eurydice being "apparently secure" are, "although this species is uncommon and local, and is a subject to some threats, they persist in a relatively large number of occurrences." The number of element occurrences for Zerene eurydice are between 81 and 300. However, the long-term trend for Zerene eurydice results in a decline of less than 30% because of "the large scale of habitat conversion that has taken place in the California Coast and Transverse Ranges in the 20th century. Another standard threat for the Zerene eurydice and all other species of butterflies is climate change. It has been stated that warmer dry temperatures created by climate change are the deadliest conditions for the butterfly species. “It could be due to longer, more intense summers leaving plants parched, which diminishes the nectar butterflies feed on.” Long-term tracking has revealed that recent changes in climate alter species habitat quality and food supply. Leading to significant decline of butterfly population.
