= Charlton Recreation Area =

- Charlton Spillway-Dam
- U.S. National Register of Historic Places
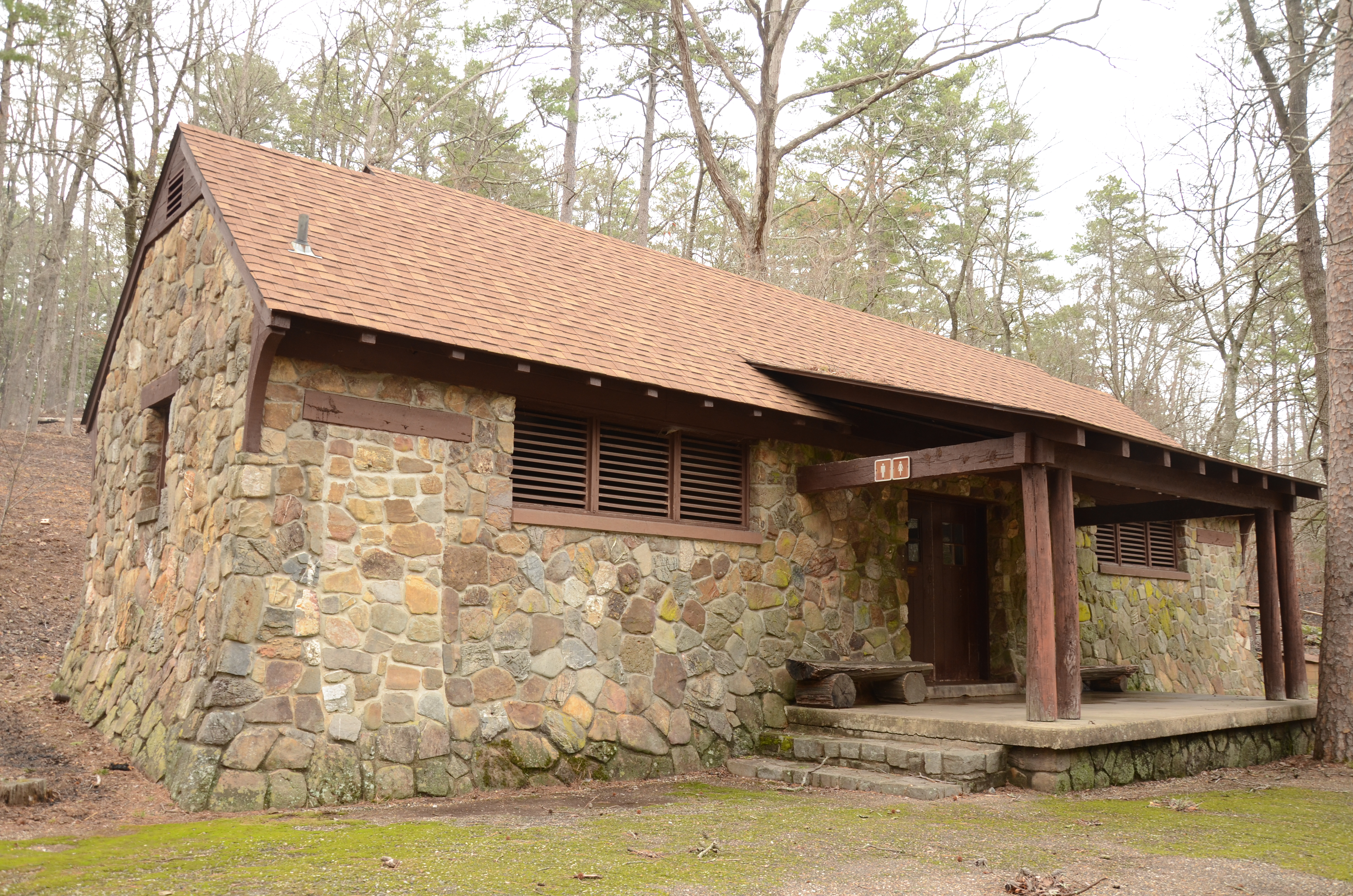

- Location within Arkansas Location within the United States
- Nearest city: Crystal Springs, Arkansas
- Coordinates: 34°31′3″N 93°22′53″W
- Area: less than one acre
- Built: 1938
- Built by: Civilian Conservation Corps
- Architectural style: Rustic
- MPS: Facilities Constructed by the CCC in Arkansas MPS
- NRHP reference No.: 93001081
- Added to NRHP: October 21, 1993

The Charlton Recreation Area is a public use area of the Ouachita National Forest, located just north of United States Route 270 between Crystal Springs and Mount Ida, Arkansas. The area includes a campground and day use facilities for water-related activities on Walnut Creek, including fishing and swimming. The facilities are organized around a small artificial lake created in 1938 by a crew of the Civilian Conservation Corps by damming the creek. The stone Charlton Dam and Spillway, about 100 feet (30 m) in length, was listed on the National Register of Historic Places 1993, as was the stone Charlton Bathhouse, also built by the CCC in 1938.

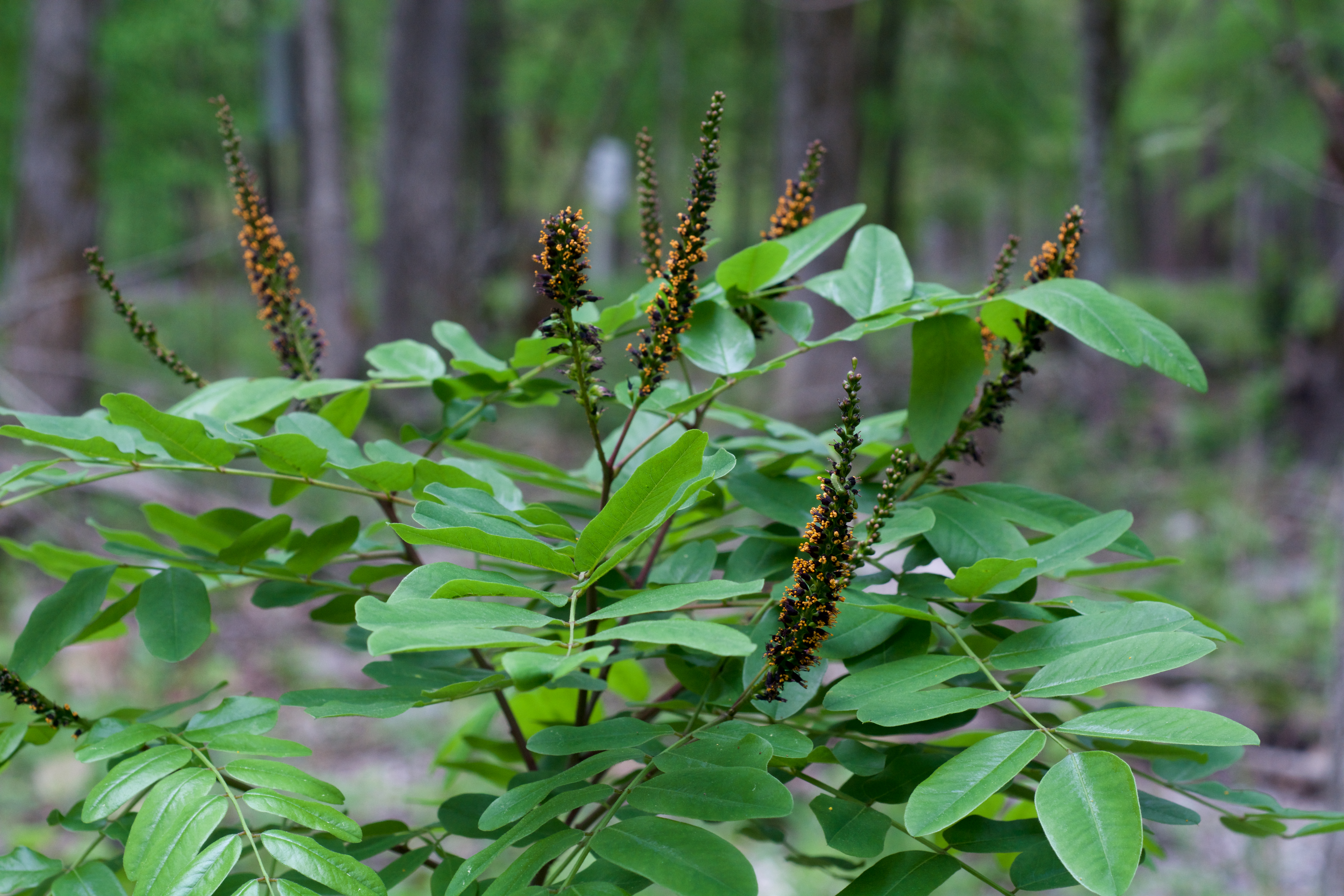
Amorpha nitens photographed at Walnut Creek at the Charlton Recreation Area, Ouachita National Forest, Garland County, Arkansas taken 2018

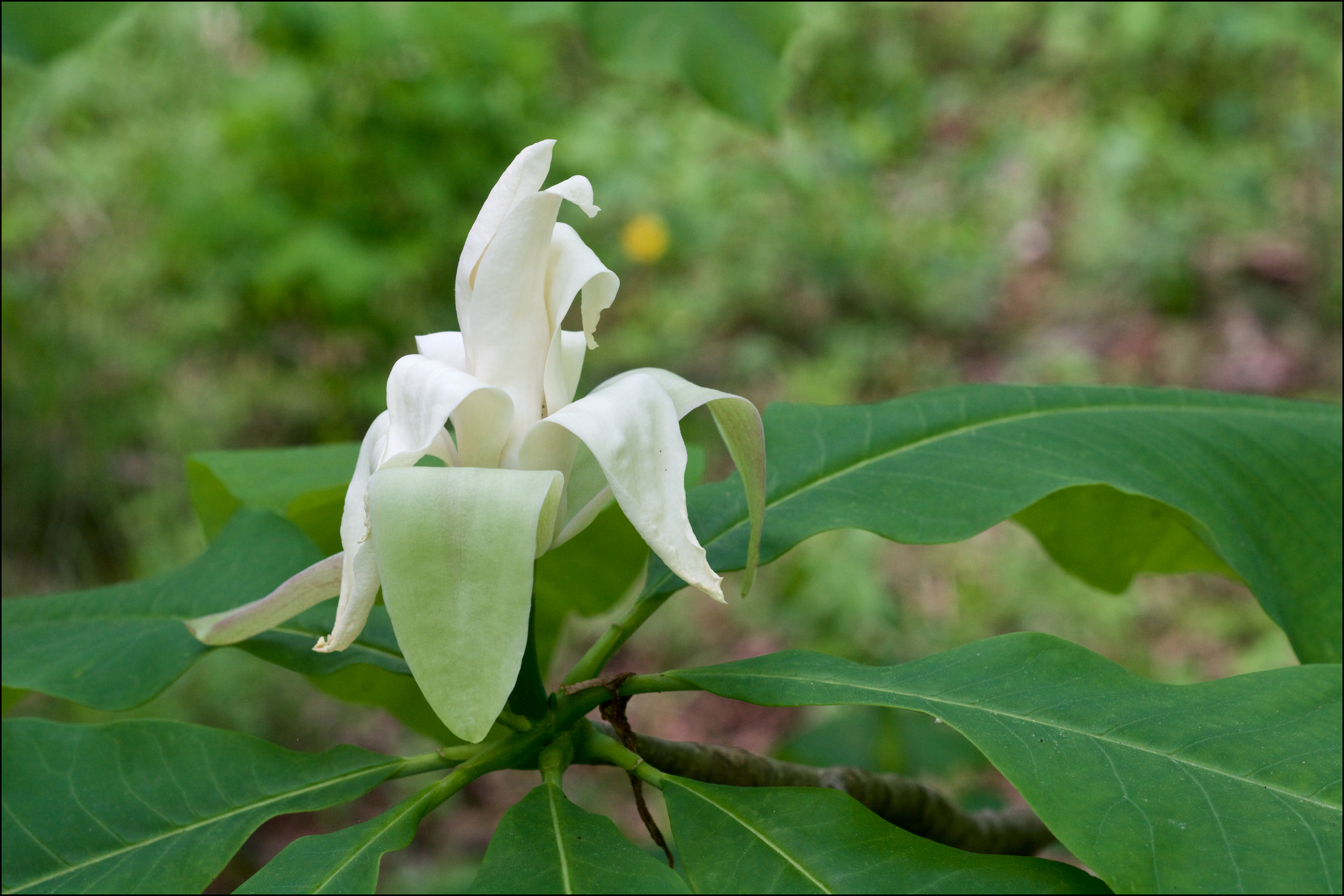
Magnolia tripetala photographed at Walnut Creek at the Charlton Recreation Area, Ouachita National Forest, Garland County, Arkansas taken 2018

== See also ==
- National Register of Historic Places listings in Garland County, Arkansas
