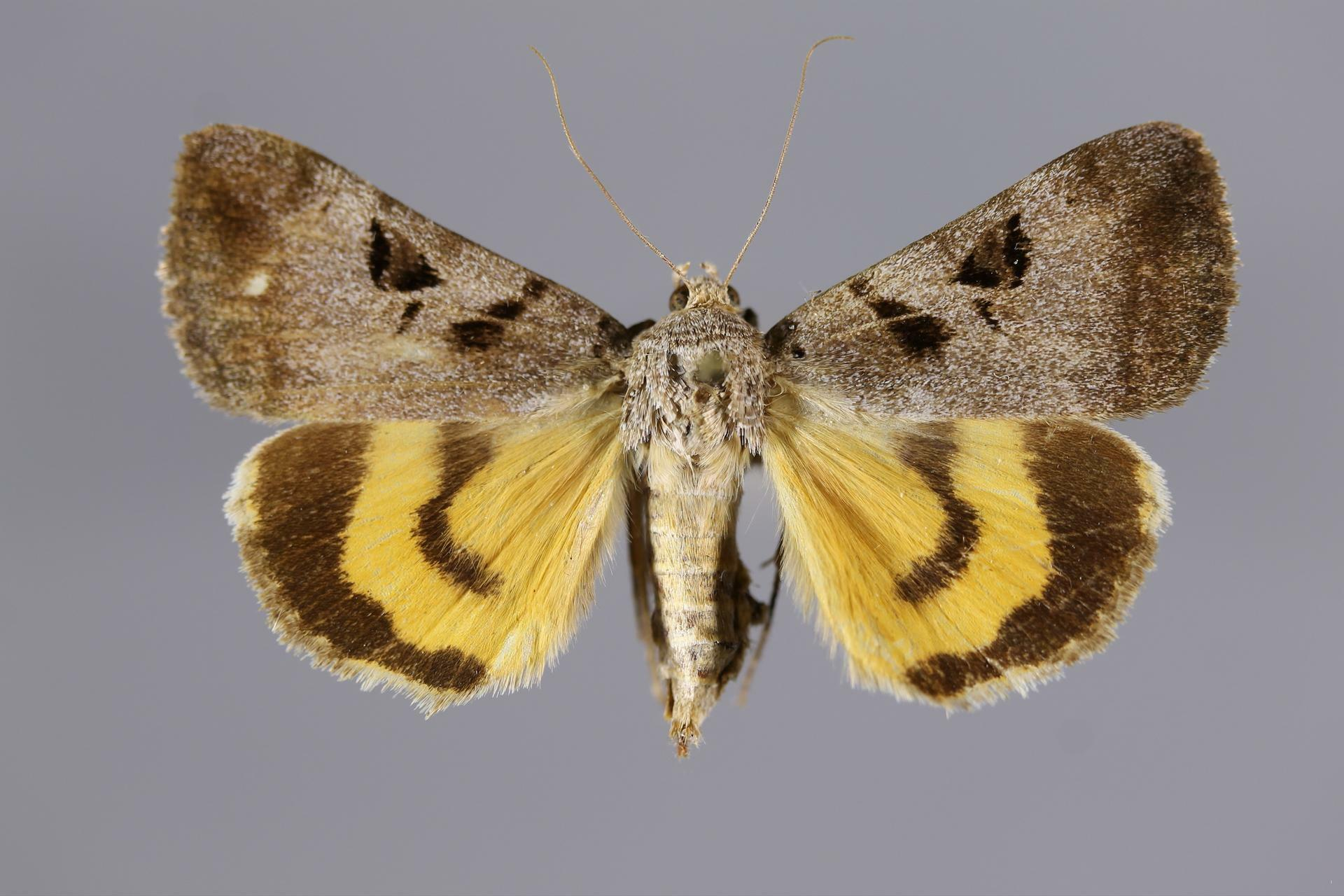

Scientific classification
- Kingdom: Animalia
- Phylum: Arthropoda
- Class: Insecta
- Order: Lepidoptera
- Superfamily: Noctuoidea
- Family: Erebidae
- Genus: Catocala
- Species: C. whitneyi

Binomial name
- Catocala whitneyi Dodge, 1874

Synonyms
- Catocala vhitneyi Hampson, 1913; Catocala obscura Draudt, 1939

= Catocala whitneyi =

Whitney's underwing

Species of moth

Catocala whitneyi, or Whitney's underwing, is a moth of the family Erebidae. The species was first described by G. M. Dodge in 1874. It is found in North America from North Dakota, Nebraska, and Kansas eastward through Wisconsin to Ohio and Tennessee. It has also been recorded as far west as Minnesota and Utah. In Canada, it has been found in Manitoba.

The wingspan is 45–50 mm. Adults are on wing from July to August in one generation depending on the location.

The larvae feed on Amorpha species.
