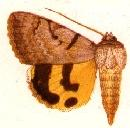

Scientific classification
- Kingdom: Animalia
- Phylum: Arthropoda
- Class: Insecta
- Order: Lepidoptera
- Superfamily: Noctuoidea
- Family: Erebidae
- Genus: Catocala
- Species: C. abbreviatella

Binomial name
- Catocala abbreviatella Grote, 1872

= Catocala abbreviatella =

Species of moth

Catocala abbreviatella is a moth of the family Erebidae. It is found from Indiana south and west to Texas and Oklahoma and north to Nebraska and Wisconsin.

The wingspan is 40–50 mm. Adults are on wing from July to August depending on the location. There is probably one generation per year.

The larvae feed on Amorpha and possibly Robinia species.
