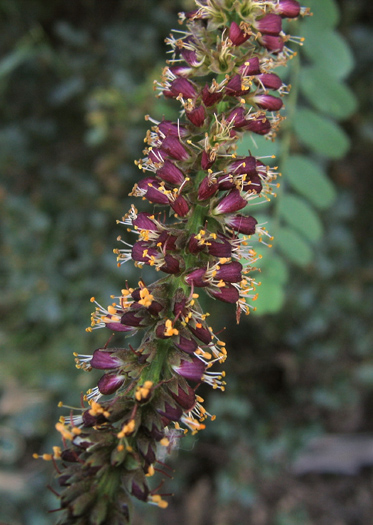
- var. californica

Conservation status
- Least Concern (IUCN 3.1)

Scientific classification
- Kingdom: Plantae
- Clade: Tracheophytes
- Clade: Angiosperms
- Clade: Eudicots
- Clade: Rosids
- Order: Fabales
- Family: Fabaceae
- Subfamily: Faboideae
- Genus: Amorpha
- Species: A. californica

Binomial name
- Amorpha californica Nutt.

= Amorpha californica =

Species of flowering plant

Amorpha californica is a species of flowering plant in the legume family known by the common name California false indigo.

It is native to California, Arizona, and northern Baja California, where it grows in the California chaparral and woodlands and other chaparral and oak woodlands habitats. It is generally considered an understory plant.

== Description ==
Amorpha californica is a glandular, thorn-less shrub with leaves made up of spiny, oval-shaped leaflets each tipped with a resin gland. The scattered inflorescences are spike-like racemes of flowers, each flower with a single violet petal and ten protruding stamens. The fruit is a legume pod containing usually a single seed.

== Subspecies ==
The standard variety is Amorpha californica var. californica. Amorpha california var. napensis is a rare plant; it only grows around San Francisco and in the North Coast Ranges.

== Butterflies ==
The endemic California dogface butterfly larvae feed on Amorpha californica, along with the Southern dogface and the silver-spotted skipper.

== See also ==
- Amorpha fruticosa
