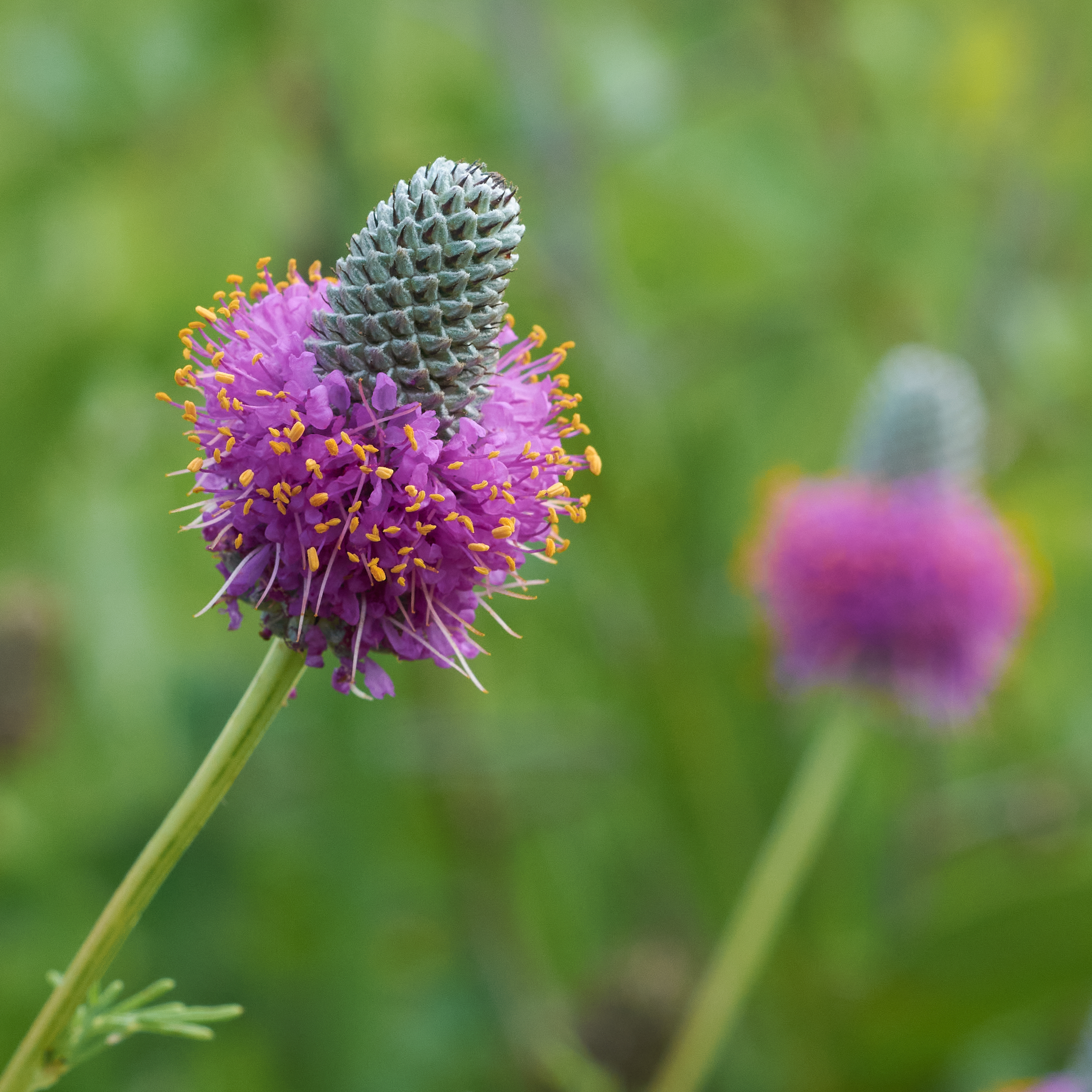

Conservation status
- Secure (NatureServe)

Scientific classification
- Kingdom: Plantae
- Clade: Tracheophytes
- Clade: Angiosperms
- Clade: Eudicots
- Clade: Rosids
- Order: Fabales
- Family: Fabaceae
- Subfamily: Faboideae
- Genus: Dalea
- Species: D. purpurea

Binomial name
- Dalea purpurea Vent.

Varieties
- Dalea purpurea var. arenicola (Wemple) Barneby; Dalea purpurea var. purpurea

Synonyms
- List: Dalea arenicola (Wemple) B.L.Turner (2003); Dalea purpurea f. albiflora (W.H.Horr & McGregor) McGregor (1957); Dalea purpurea f. arenaria (F.C.Gates) McGregor (1957); Dalea violacea Michx. ex Willd. (1802); Kuhnistera purpurea (Vent.) MacMill. (1892); Kuhnistera violacea (Michx.) Aiton ex Steud. (1840); Petalostemon arenicola Wemple (1970); Petalostemon mollis Rydb. (1900); Petalostemon pubescens A.Nelson (1901); Petalostemon purpureus (Vent.) Rydb. (1900); Petalostemon purpureus f. albiflorus W.H.Horr & McGregor (1952); Petalostemon purpureus f. arenarius F.C.Gates (1911); Petalostemon purpureus var. mollis (Rydb.) A.Nelson (1909); Petalostemon standleyanus Rydb. (1920); Petalostemon violaceus Michx. (1803); Psoralea purpurea (Vent.) Poir. (1804); Psoralea violacea DC. (1825)

= Dalea purpurea =

Species of flowering plant in the pea family

Dalea purpurea is a species of flowering plant in the legume family known as purple prairie clover. Native to central North America, purple prairie clover is a relatively common member of the Great Plains and prairie ecosystems. It blooms in the summer with dense spikes of bright purple flowers that attract many species of insects.

== Distribution ==
It is native to central North America, where it occurs from central Canada to the southeastern and southwestern United States, except for the east and west coasts. It is a common and widespread plant within its range, especially on the Great Plains. In 1804, Meriwether Lewis collected a specimen in Nebraska.

== Description ==
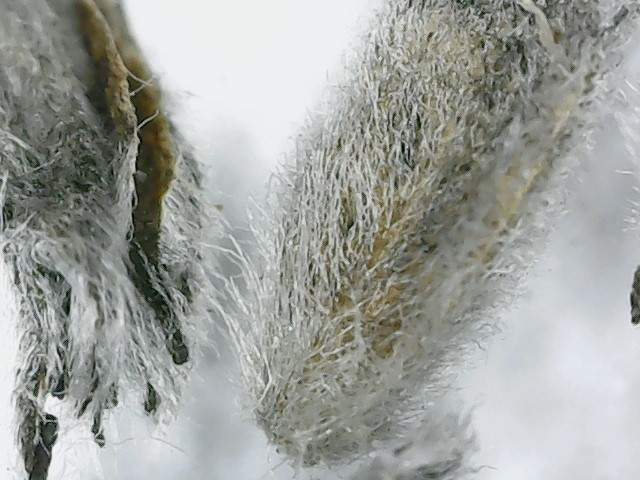
Fruits of purple prairie clover with hairs

Dalea purpurea is a perennial herb growing 20 to 90 cm (8 to 35 in) tall. The mature plant has a large taproot 5.5 to 6.5 feet (1.7 to 2.0 m) deep. The stem is woody with several branches. The leaves are a few centimeters long and are divided into 3 to 7 narrow leaflets. The inflorescence atop each stem branch is a spike up to 7 cm (2 3/4 in) long containing many purple flowers. The fruit is a legume pod containing 1 or 2 seeds. The Latin specific epithet purpurea means purple.

== Ecology ==
This plant is adapted to a habitat with periodic wildfires. In some areas, it depends on fire to clear encroaching woody vegetation, as it cannot tolerate shade.

Dalea purpurea is a common member of the flora on the plains of central North America, occurring in a variety of habitat types, including several types of grassland. It occurs in glades, riverbanks and floodplains, oak woodlands, pinyon-juniper woodlands, shrubsteppe, many types of forests, and the Sand Hills of Nebraska. It occurs in a variety of prairie ecosystems. On tallgrass prairie it is associated with plants such as little bluestem (Schizachyrium scoparium), big bluestem (Andropogon gerardi), prairie Junegrass (Koeleria macrantha), prairie dropseed (Sporobolus heterolepis), lead plant (Amorpha canescens), and silky aster (Symphyotrichum sericeum). On midgrass prairie it grows alongside several grasses such as silver bluestem (Bothriochloa saccharoides), purple threeawn (Aristida purpurea), sideoats grama (Bouteloua curtipendula), and sand dropseed (Sporobolus cryptandrus). On shortgrass prairie it is associated with grasses such as blue grama (Bouteloua gracilis), hairy grama (B. hirsuta), and buffalo grass (B. dactyloides). This species may be considered an indicator of pristine prairie.

The nectar and pollen of Dalea purpurea attract many bees, wasps, flies, butterflies, and skippers. Several plasterer bees (genus Colletes) are specialist pollinators of Dalea species, and other insects eat the seeds and leaves. It is a larval host to the southern dogface (Zerene cesonia).

== Uses ==
This species is used for revegetation efforts on reclaimed land, such as land that has been strip mined. It is good for preventing erosion and for fixing nitrogen in soil. Though it is often found in mid- to late-successional stages of ecological succession, it may also be a pioneer species, taking hold in bare and disturbed habitat, such as roadsides.

Purple prairie clover provides food for a number of animals, such as pronghorn. It also grows in cultivated fields and becomes included in hay for livestock. It is nutritious and is "considered one of the most important legumes in native grasslands on the Great Plains." It also had a number of uses for Native Americans. The leaves are edible and good for making tea and medicines, and the roots are palatable when chewed. The stems were used as brooms by the Pawnee people.

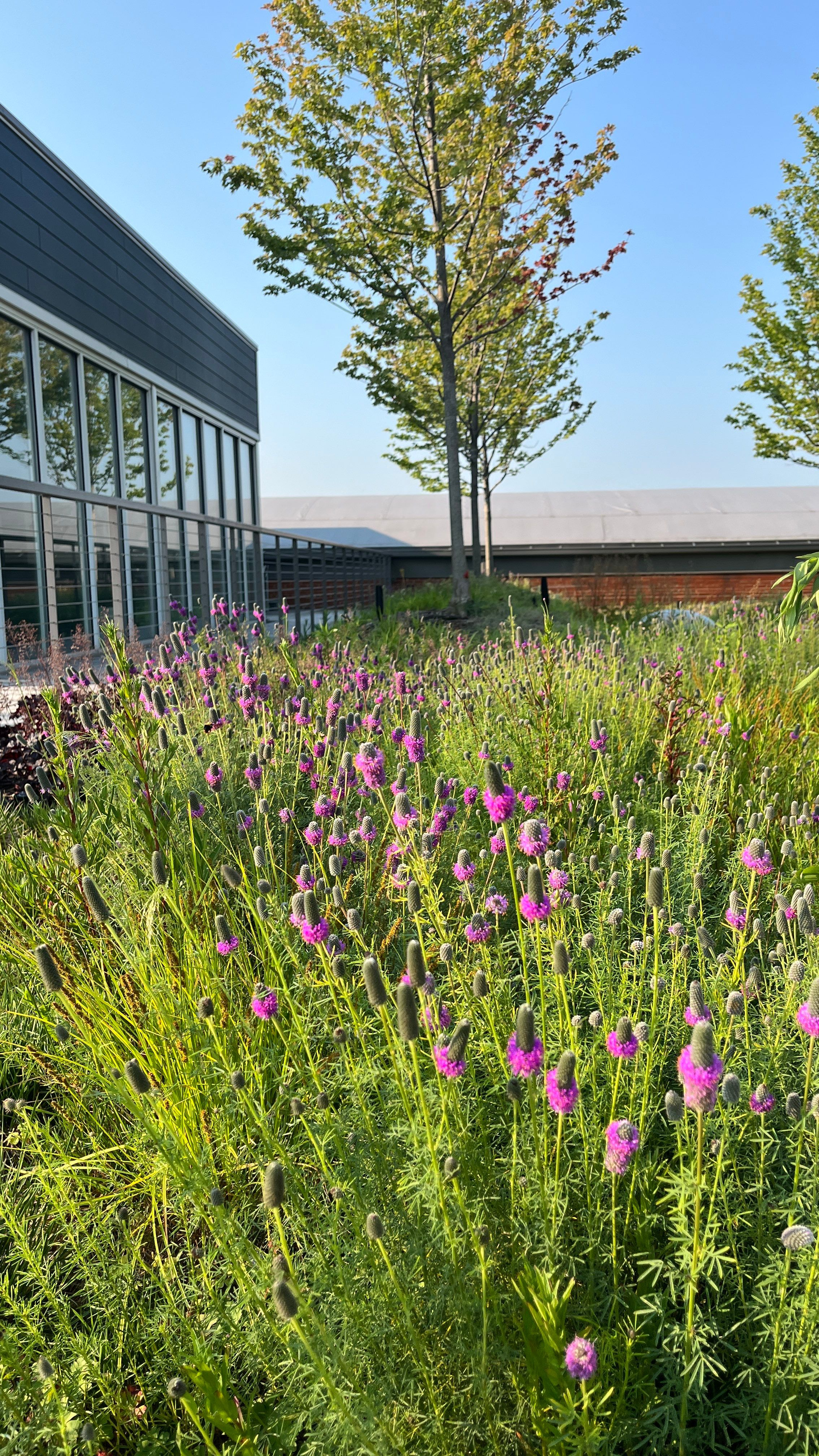
Purple prairie clover blooming on a green roof in Chicago

It is used as part of green roof plantings meant to create habitats for prairie species.

=== Medicinal plant ===
Dalea purpurea has been found to contain several active constituents, including pawhuskin A, pawhuskin B, pawhuskin C, and petalostemumol. The pawhuskins possess affinity for the opioid receptors, and pawhuskin A, by far the most potent of the group, acts as a non-selective antagonist of all three opioid receptors, with preference for the κ- and μ-opioid receptors over the δ-opioid receptor.
