= Amorpha georgiana =

Scientific classification
- Kingdom: Plantae
- Clade: Tracheophytes
- Clade: Angiosperms
- Clade: Eudicots
- Clade: Rosids
- Order: Fabales
- Family: Fabaceae
- Subfamily: Faboideae
- Genus: Amorpha
- Species: A. georgiana

Binomial name
- Amorpha georgiana Wilbur

Species of plant

Amorpha georgiana, the Georgia false indigo, is a species of flowering plant in the family Fabaceae, native to southeastern North Carolina, South Carolina, and Georgia in the United States. A rare subshrub, it is found in the endangered longleaf pine ecosystem, and, like most species there, is fire‑adapted. Fire suppression is a major threat to A. georgiana.

== Current populations ==
There are fourteen known populations of A. georgiana that exist today. There are three in South Carolina, ten in North Carolina, and one in Georgia. The North Carolina populations have the strongest genetic diversity as there are more individuals and they are the least isolated from each other. The Georgia population is the smallest and most isolated of the three. This population is listed as critically imperiled.

== Threats ==
Habitat degradation, fire suppression, and urbanization are all threats to existing Amorpha georgiana populations. Because the seeds and pods require temperatures over 80 °C to release from dormancy, fire suppression can reduce the probability of germination, reducing reproduction rates. When exposed to temperatures mimicking fire conditions, there is a 3.5 times higher probability of germination. Recent research found that A. georgiana is an obligate pyrogenic dormancy release species.

== Conservation strategies ==
Prescribed burning of sites containing A. georgiana during the growing season is recommended. Typically, prescribed burning is done during the dormant season, but recent research suggests that growing season fires are more effective at releasing A. georgiana seeds from dormancy as it is fires historically occurred during the growing season. For best results, fire should only occur every two to three years as germination occurs between one and two years after a fire.

Fire regimes have been shown to be effective at restoring longleaf pine savannahs. In Georgia, significant habitat loss has occurred due to conversion of long leaf pine ecosystems into pine plantations. Conservation of existing long leaf pine ecosystems is a key factor in the conservation of this species.

Hybridization with closely related species, such as Amorpha herbacea and Amorpha confusa are being researched as avenues of genetic conservation.
