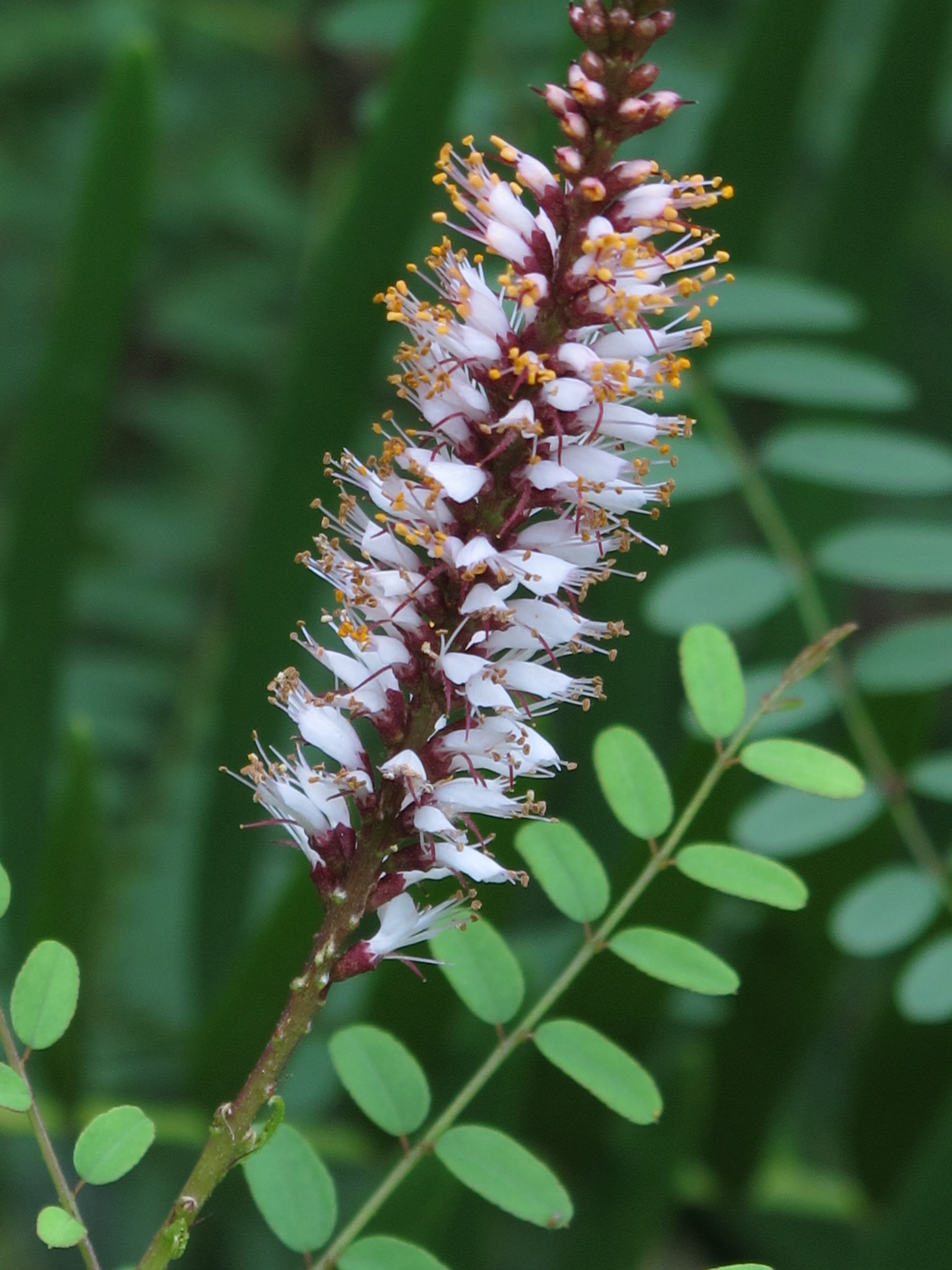

Conservation status
- Critically Endangered (IUCN 3.1)

Scientific classification
- Kingdom: Plantae
- Clade: Tracheophytes
- Clade: Angiosperms
- Clade: Eudicots
- Clade: Rosids
- Order: Fabales
- Family: Fabaceae
- Subfamily: Faboideae
- Genus: Amorpha
- Species: A. crenulata

Binomial name
- Amorpha crenulata Rydb.

Synonyms
- Amorpha herbacea var. crenulata (Rydb.) Isely

= Amorpha crenulata =

Species of flowering plant

Amorpha crenulata is species of a flowering plant, also known as Amorpha herbacea var. crenulata and by the common name crenulate lead-plant. It is native to the southern tip of Florida, where it was listed as endangered in 1985 and is currently listed as critically endangered. It only has two wild populations, only found in Fairchild Tropical Gardens and A. D. Barnes Park. A recovery plan for it and other species in Florida was proposed in 1999, but the 2010 assessment found just 200 mature plants. The population is decreasing quickly, with 80% of the population being wiped out in A. D. Barnes between 2010-2023. The species is threatened by fire exclusion and the habitat degradation that occurs as a result.

It is a semi-deciduous flowering shrub with dark green leaflets and multi-colored flowers including white, blue, orange and purple.
