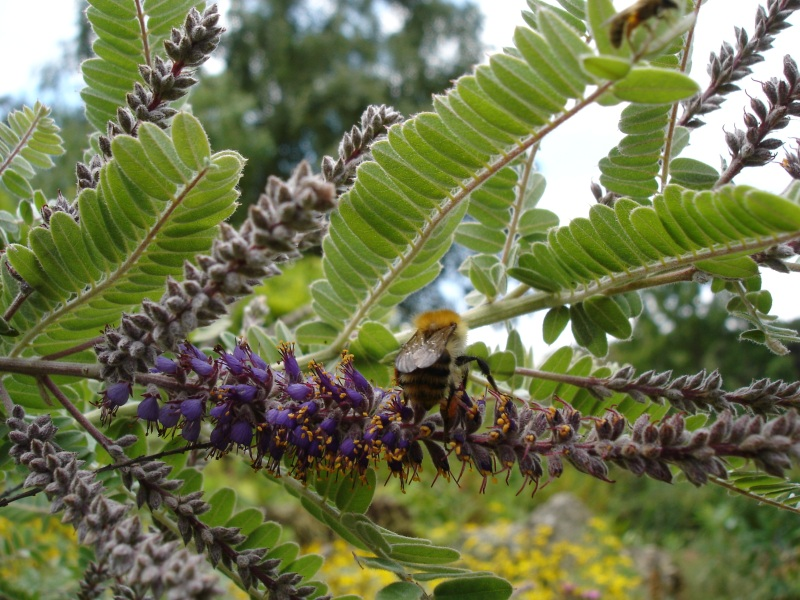
- Inflorescence and foliage

Conservation status
- Secure (NatureServe)

Scientific classification
- Kingdom: Plantae
- Clade: Tracheophytes
- Clade: Angiosperms
- Clade: Eudicots
- Clade: Rosids
- Order: Fabales
- Family: Fabaceae
- Subfamily: Faboideae
- Genus: Amorpha
- Species: A. nana

Binomial name
- Amorpha nana Nutt.

Synonyms
- Amorpha microphylla Pursh (1813); Amorpha punctata Raf. (1838)

= Amorpha nana =

Species of flowering plant in the pea family

Amorpha nana (dwarf indigo, dwarf indigobush, dwarf false indigo, fragrant indigo-bush, fragrant false indigo, dwarf wild indigo) is a 1–3-foot (30–91 cm) tall perennial shrub in the Pea family (Fabaceae) which is native to North America. It has vibrant green pinnate leaves and clusters of purple flowers. The fruits are small pods. Dwarf false indigo grows in dry prairies and rocky hillsides. Amorpha nana likes rocky and sandy soil.

Thomas Nuttall described this species for science in 1813. The species name, nana, is the botanical Latin term for "dwarf".
