= Phyllecthris =

Scientific classification
- Kingdom: Animalia
- Phylum: Arthropoda
- Clade: Pancrustacea
- Class: Insecta
- Order: Coleoptera
- Suborder: Polyphaga
- Infraorder: Cucujiformia
- Family: Chrysomelidae
- Tribe: Luperini
- Genus: Phyllecthris; Dejean, 1836

Synonyms
- Myocera Dejean, 1836

Genus of beetles

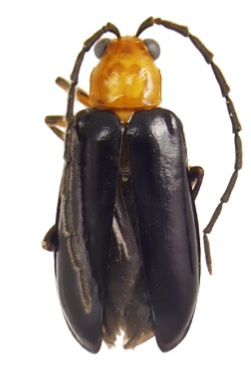
Phyllecthris dorsalis

Phyllecthris is a genus of leaf beetles in the family Chrysomelidae. There are at least three described species in Phyllecthris. They are found in North America.

== Species ==
These three species belong to the genus Phyllecthris:

- Phyllecthris dorsalis (Olivier, 1808)
- Phyllecthris gentilis J. L. LeConte, 1865
- Phyllecthris texanus J. L. LeConte, 1884
