= Phyllecthris gentilis =

Scientific classification
- Kingdom: Animalia
- Phylum: Arthropoda
- Clade: Pancrustacea
- Class: Insecta
- Order: Coleoptera
- Suborder: Polyphaga
- Infraorder: Cucujiformia
- Family: Chrysomelidae
- Genus: Phyllecthris
- Species: P. gentilis

Binomial name
- Phyllecthris gentilis J. L. LeConte, 1865

Species of beetle

Phyllecthris gentilis is a species of leaf beetle in the family Chrysomelidae. It is found in North America.
