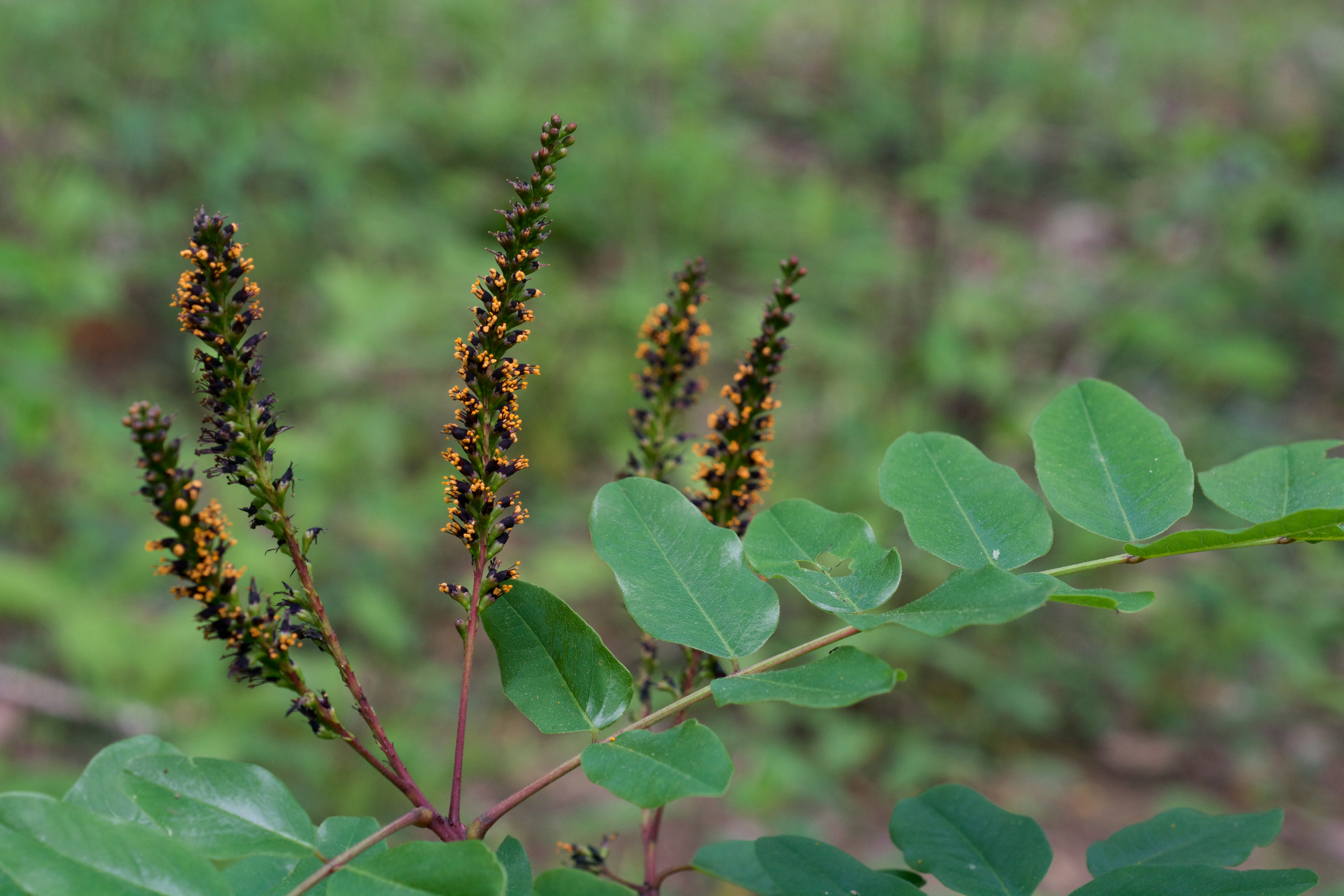
- Shining false indigo

Conservation status
- Vulnerable (NatureServe)

Scientific classification
- Kingdom: Plantae
- Clade: Tracheophytes
- Clade: Angiosperms
- Clade: Eudicots
- Clade: Rosids
- Order: Fabales
- Family: Fabaceae
- Subfamily: Faboideae
- Genus: Amorpha
- Species: A. nitens

Binomial name
- Amorpha nitens Boynt.

= Amorpha nitens =

Species of legume

Amorpha nitens, the shining false indigo, is a species of flowering plant in the pea family. It is native to the southern United States, in Arkansas, Tennessee, Oklahoma, Louisiana, Illinois, Alabama, Georgia, Kentucky and South Carolina.
