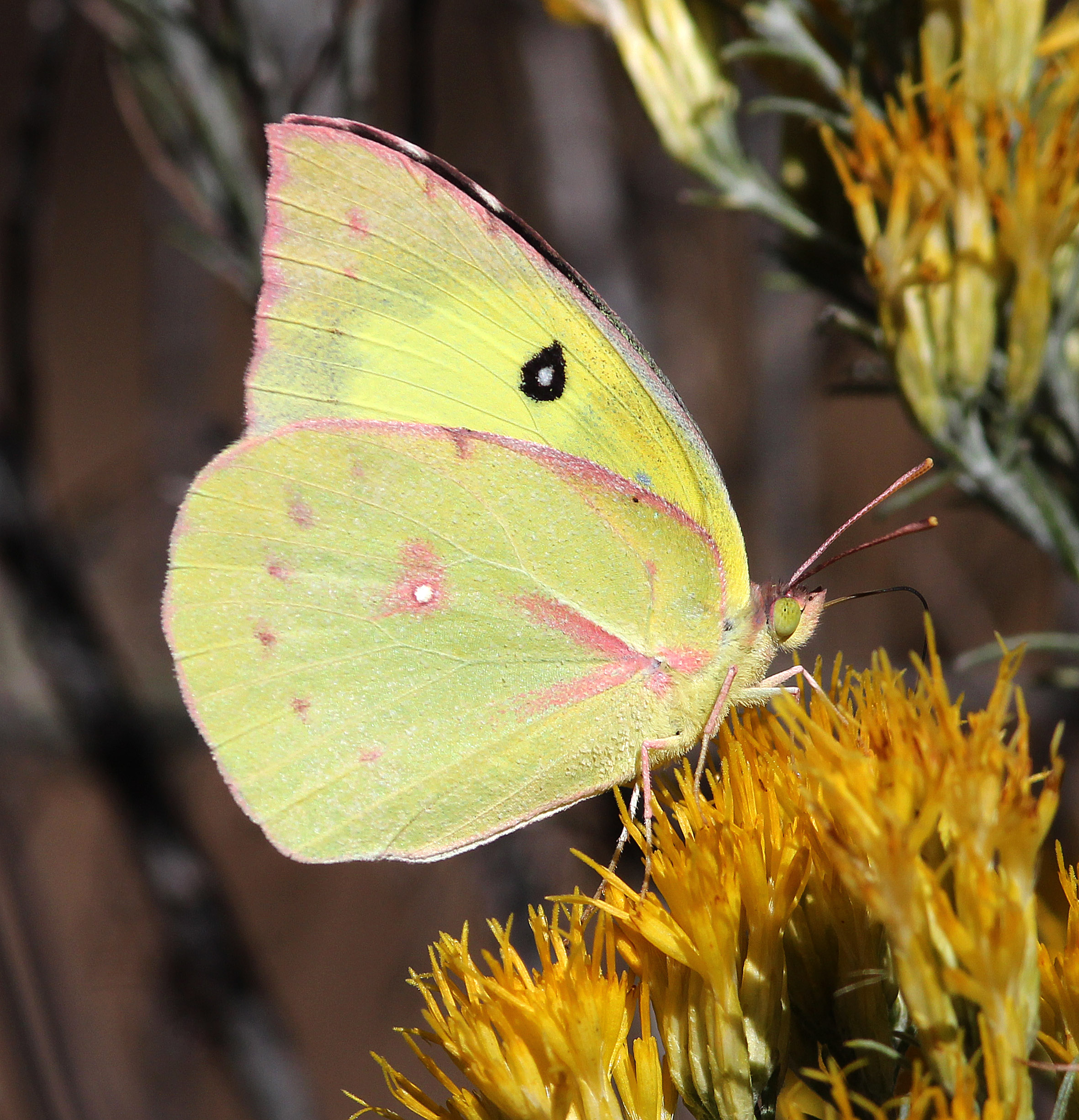

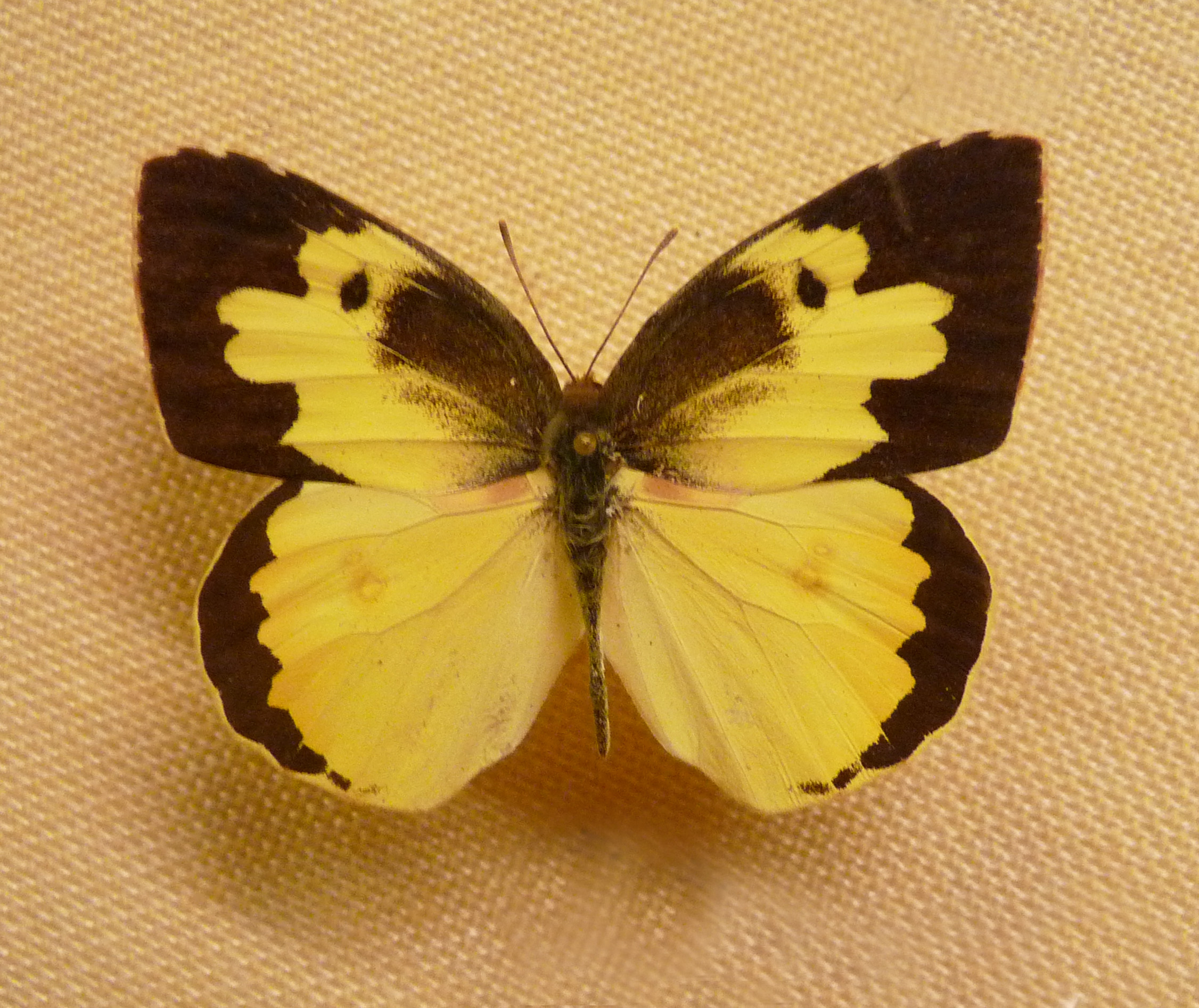

Conservation status
- Least Concern (IUCN 3.1)

- Secure (NatureServe)

Scientific classification
- Kingdom: Animalia
- Phylum: Arthropoda
- Class: Insecta
- Order: Lepidoptera
- Family: Pieridae
- Genus: Zerene
- Species: Z. cesonia

Binomial name
- Zerene cesonia (Stoll, 1790)
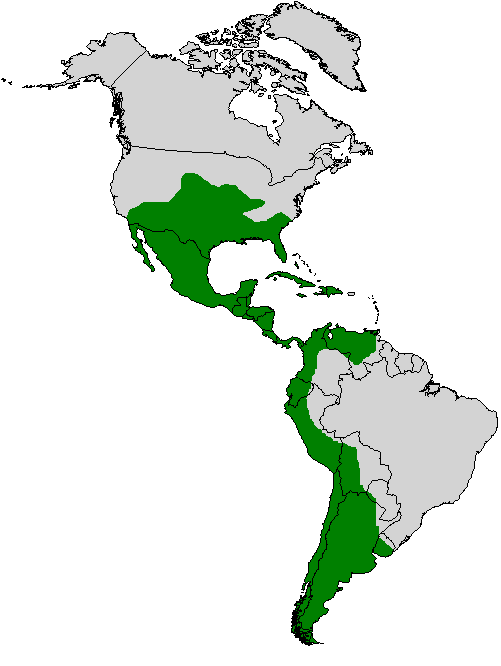

Synonyms
- Colias cesonia (Stoll, 1790)

= Zerene cesonia =

Southern dogface

Species of butterfly

Zerene cesonia, the southern dogface, is a North and South American butterfly in the family Pieridae, subfamily Coliadinae (until recently the species was sometimes placed in the related genus Colias instead of Zerene).

== Description ==
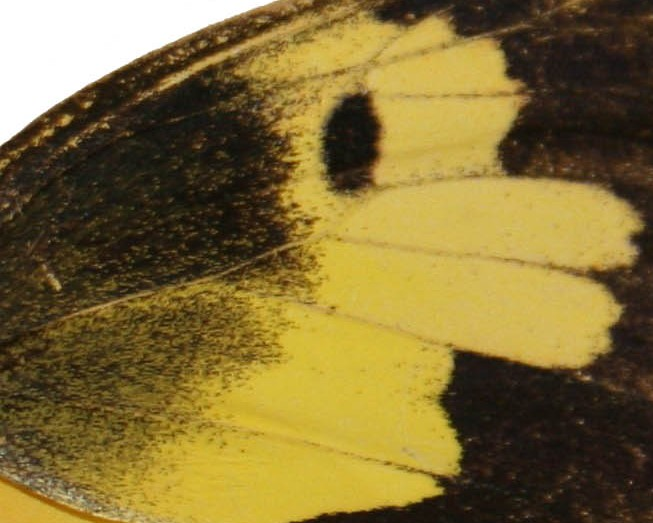
Dogface pattern

The upper side of the pointed forewings have a dogface pattern. The wings are mainly yellow with black borders. The underside of the wings is mostly yellow with a black eyespot on the forewing and two white spots on the hindwing.

== Ecology ==
This butterfly can be found in short-grass prairie hills, open woodlands, and near road edges.

Both male and female southern dogfaces may be seen feeding at flowers such as alfalfa, Coreopsis species, Houstonia species, and Verbena species. Males are also fond of puddling. Its host plants include the leadplant Amorpha canescens, false indigo Amorpha fruticosa, soybean Glycine max, alfalfa Medicago sativa, black dalea Dalea frutescens, purple prairie clover Dalea purpurea, and clover Trifolium species.

Males patrol areas for females. The male is the active flight partner.

The green-white eggs are laid on the underside of the host plant leaves. The larva is green with a white stripe running down each side of its body. The green chrysalis hangs upright with a silken girdle around itself.
