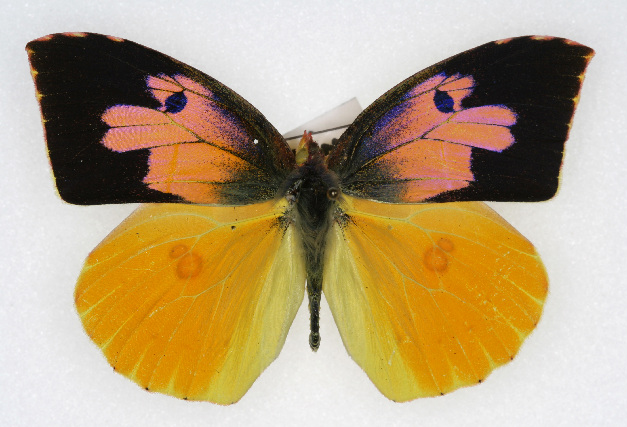
- Zerene eurydice male

Scientific classification
- Kingdom: Animalia
- Phylum: Arthropoda
- Clade: Pancrustacea
- Class: Insecta
- Order: Lepidoptera
- Family: Pieridae
- Subfamily: Coliadinae
- Tribe: Coliadini
- Genus: Zerene; Hübner, 1819

Synonyms
- Megonostoma Reakirt, 1863

= Zerene =

Butterfly genus in family Pieridae

Zerene is a genus of butterflies in the family Pieridae commonly called dogfaces. The closest living relative is the genus Colias. They are migratory.

== Species ==
- Zerene cesonia (Stoll, 1790) – southern dogface
- Zerene eurydice (Boisduval, 1855) – California dogface
