= Pawhuskin A =

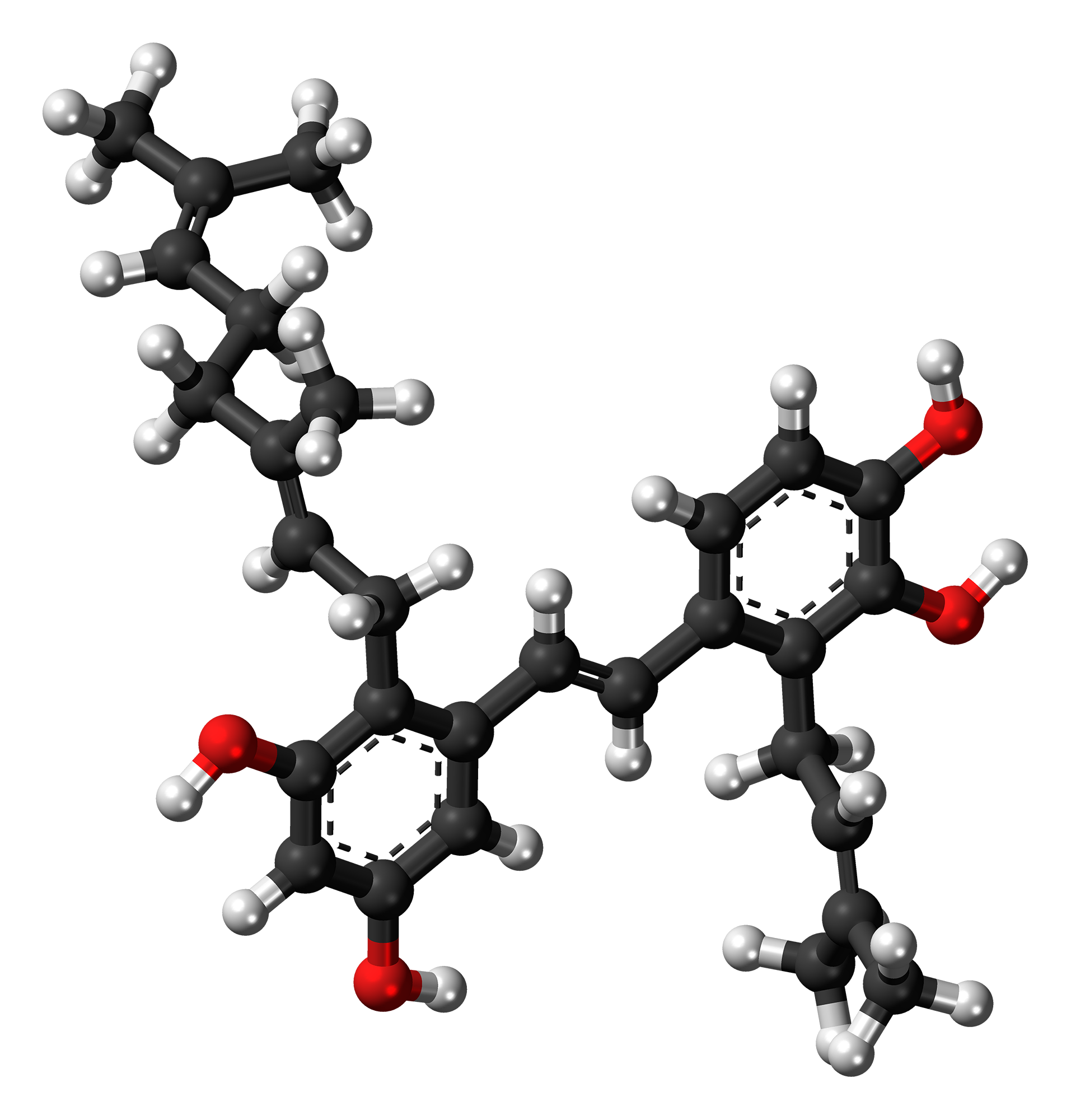

Names
- Preferred IUPAC name 4-[(E)-2-{2-[(2E)-3,7-Dimethylocta-2,6-dien-1-yl]-3,5-dihydroxyphenyl}ethen-1-yl]-3-(3-methylbut-2-en-1-yl)benzene-1,2-diol

Identifiers
CAS Number	656235-31-3
3D model (JSmol)	Interactive image
ChEMBL	ChEMBL513748
ChemSpider	8541870
PubChem CID	10366422
CompTox Dashboard (EPA)	DTXSID001032044
- InChI: InChI=1S/C29H36O4/c1-19(2)7-6-8-21(5)10-15-25-23(17-24(30)18-28(25)32)12-11-22-13-16-27(31)29(33)26(22)14-9-20(3)4/h7,9-13,16-18,30-33H,6,8,14-15H2,1-5H3/b12-11+,21-10+ Key: LZRXMBPDNILKDO-ZVBRSKEYSA-N; InChI=1/C29H36O4/c1-19(2)7-6-8-21(5)10-15-25-23(17-24(30)18-28(25)32)12-11-22-13-16-27(31)29(33)26(22)14-9-20(3)4/h7,9-13,16-18,30-33H,6,8,14-15H2,1-5H3/b12-11+,21-10+ Key: LZRXMBPDNILKDO-ZVBRSKEYBQ
- SMILES: CC(=CCC/C(=C/CC1=C(C=C(C=C1O)O)/C=C/C2=C(C(=C(C=C2)O)O)CC=C(C)C)/C)C

Properties
Chemical formula	C_{29}H_{36}O_{4}
Molar mass	448.603 g·mol^{−1}
- Except where otherwise noted, data are given for materials in their standard state (at 25 °C [77 °F], 100 kPa). Infobox references

Pawhuskin A is a naturally occurring prenylated stilbene isolated from Dalea purpurea which acts as a competitive silent antagonist of the κ-, μ-, and δ-opioid receptors (K_{e} = 203 nM, 570 nM, and 2900 nM, respectively). The compound was named after Pawhuska, Oklahoma, a place near where the samples of Dalea purpurea that led to its discovery were taken from. Other isolates of the plant with affinity for opioid receptors include Pawhuskin B and Pawhuskin C, though these compounds produce comparatively weak opioid receptor displacement (4.2–11.4 μM) relative to Pawhuskin A. Dalea purpurea was used in traditional Native American medicine to treat various ailments, and pawhuskin A and related isolates may be some of the constituents of the plant which underlay this use.

== See also ==
- Amentoflavone
- Catechin
- Hyperoside
- Salvinorin A
