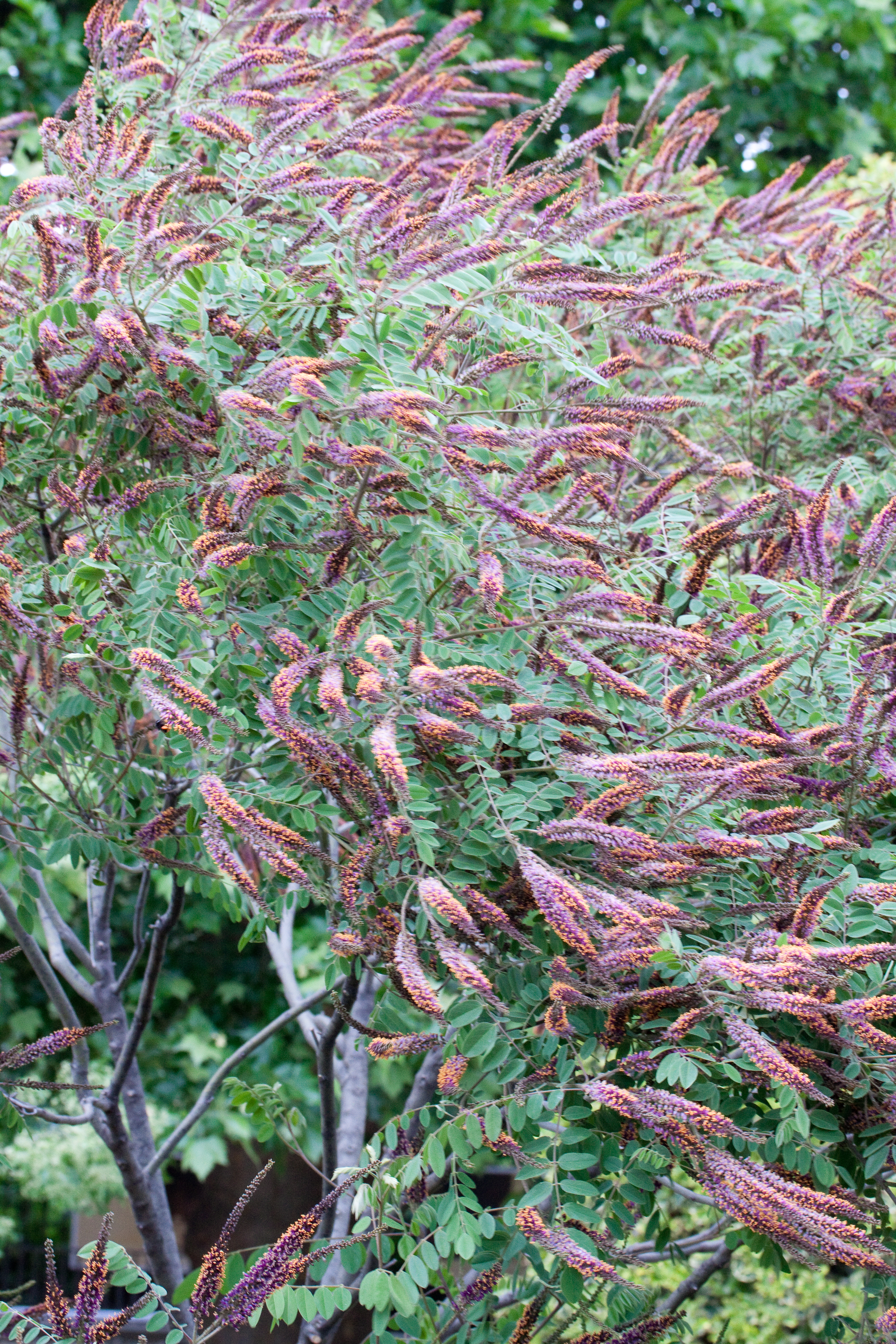
- Inflorescence

Conservation status
- Secure (NatureServe)

Scientific classification
- Kingdom: Plantae
- Clade: Tracheophytes
- Clade: Angiosperms
- Clade: Eudicots
- Clade: Rosids
- Order: Fabales
- Family: Fabaceae
- Subfamily: Faboideae
- Genus: Amorpha
- Species: A. canescens

Binomial name
- Amorpha canescens Pursh

Synonyms
- List: Amorpha brachycarpa E.J.Palmer (1931); Amorpha canescens f. glabrata (A.Gray) Fassett (1936); Amorpha canescens var. glabrata A.Gray (1852); Amorpha canescens f. glabrescens Zabel (1903); Amorpha canescens var. leptostachya A.Gray (1849); Amorpha canescens var. typica C.K.Schneid. (1907)

= Amorpha canescens =

Species of flowering plant in the pea family

Amorpha canescens, known as leadplant, downy indigo bush, prairie shoestring, or buffalo bellows, is a small, perennial semi-shrub in the pea family (Fabaceae), native to North America. It has very small purple flowers with yellow stamens which are grouped in racemes. Depending on location, the flowers bloom from late June through mid-September. The compound leaves of this plant appear leaden (the reason for the common name "leadplant") due to their dense hairiness. The roots can grow up to 5 m (16 ft) deep and can spread up to 1 metre (3 ft 3 in) radially. This plant can be found growing in well-drained soils of prairies, bluffs, and open woodlands.

== Description ==
Typically between 0.3–1 m (1 ft 0 in – 3 ft 3 in) tall, leadplant can be identified by its small purple flowers grouped in long spikes and its grey-green leaflets that are alternate and pinnately compound. The plant produces fruits in the form of hairy legumes each with one seed inside. The flower and leafing pattern is similar to Amorpha fruticosa, however, A. canescens typically only grows to be 1 meter (3 ft 3 in) high and prefers drier habitats whereas A. fruticosa can grow to be 5 or 6 meters (16 or 20 ft) high and lives in wetter areas.

== Uses ==
Leadplant is used for a variety of different purposes. Indigenous peoples such as the Oglala use the plant for medicinal purposes. Some indigenous tribes believed that the plant could aide in treating pinworms, eczema, rheumatism, neuralgia, open wounds, and cuts. The leaves of the plant were also used to make a tea and as a smoking mixture when dried, crushed and combined with buffalo fat. It also provides many benefits to the ecosystems it is a part of, for example it provides valuable nutrition for grazing animals and helps prevent soil erosion. Leadplant may also be used in landscaping and gardening purposes due to its nitrogen fixing qualities and ability to help prevent erosion. Its nodulated roots are home to nitrogen fixing bacteria which help the plants grow. On the western side of the Mississippi River in Iowa, Meskwaki women searched for the plant as it sometimes foretold the presence of lead.

== Taxonomy ==
Amorpha canescens was described by Frederick Pursh in 1814. It falls under subfamily Papilionoideae of the family Fabaceae. The specific epithet "canescens" is a botanical Latin term meaning "becoming grey". There have been further delineation beyond species of Amorpha canescens into distinct variants (such as the A. canescens var. glabrata) based on the amount of hairs and color of the leaves, however this further distinction is not typically accepted due to the wide variation in pubescence of the plant.

== Distribution and habitat ==
Amorpha canescens can be found in many locations throughout North America, ranging from southern parts of Canada south to Texas and New Mexico and spanning west to Montana and east to Michigan. Leadplant is typically found in dry prairie and savanna communities. Leadplant prefers drier, well-drained soil of many different textures including sandy, gravely, and rocky soils. Finding leadplant indicates minimal livestock grazing and well-kept land that is not overgrown or that has experienced regular fire.
