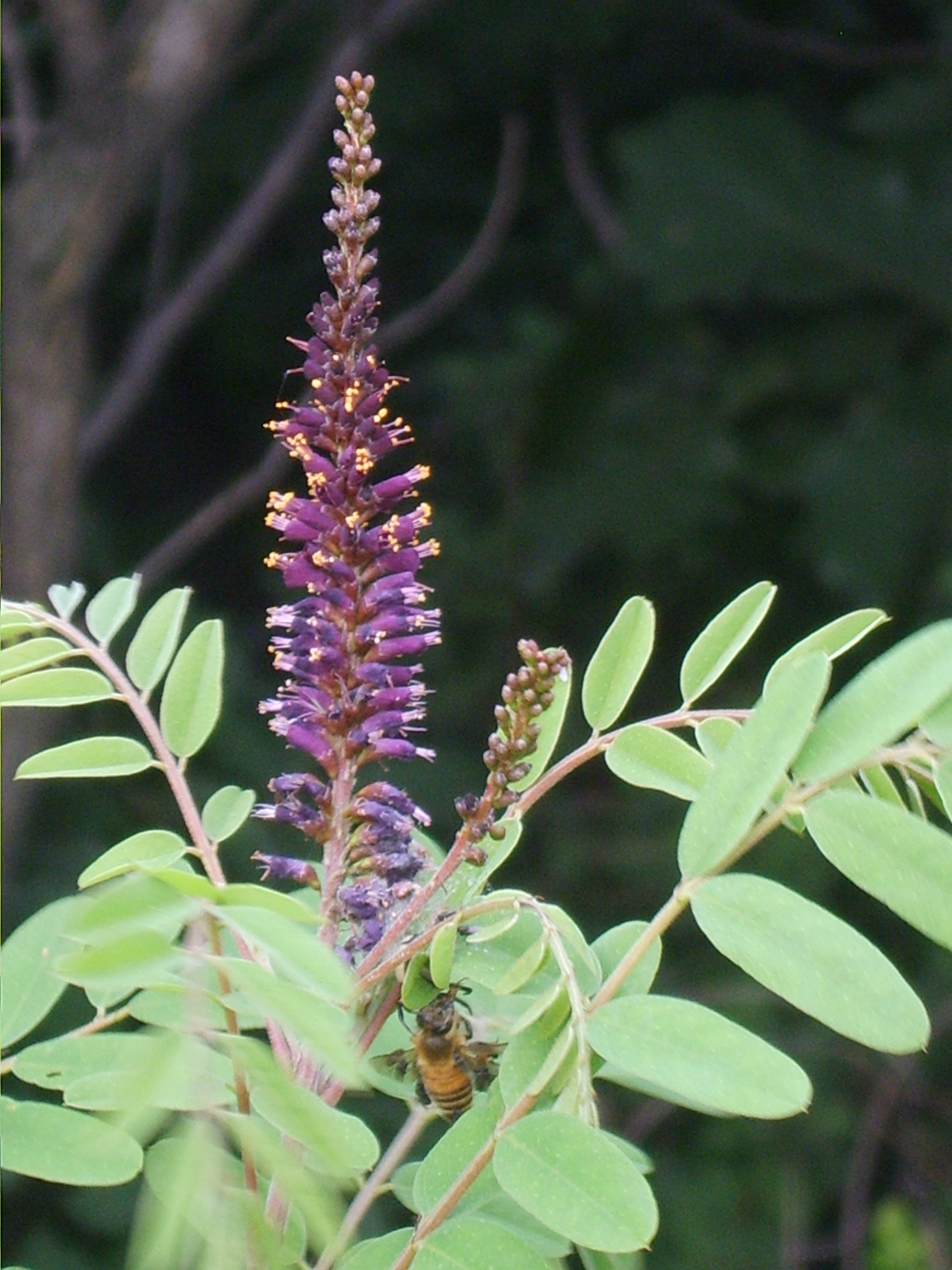

Conservation status
- Secure (NatureServe)

Scientific classification
- Kingdom: Plantae
- Clade: Tracheophytes
- Clade: Angiosperms
- Clade: Eudicots
- Clade: Rosids
- Order: Fabales
- Family: Fabaceae
- Subfamily: Faboideae
- Genus: Amorpha
- Species: A. fruticosa

Binomial name
- Amorpha fruticosa L.

Synonyms
- List: Amorpha angustifolia (Pursh) Boynton (1902); Amorpha arizonica Rydb. (1919); Amorpha bushii Rydb. (1919); Amorpha caroliniana Croom (1834); Amorpha coerulea Lodd. (1830); Amorpha colorata Raf. (1840); Amorpha croceolanata P.Watson (1825); Amorpha curtisii Rydb. (1919); Amorpha dewinkeleri Small (1933); Amorpha discolor Raf. (1840); Amorpha elata Hayne (1822); Amorpha emarginata (Pursh) Sweet (1826); Amorpha emarginata Eastw. (1931); Amorpha flexuosa Raf. (1840); Amorpha fragrans Sweet (1828); Amorpha gaertneri K.Koch (1869); Amorpha gardneri K.Koch (1869); Amorpha glauca Raf. (1840); Amorpha herbacea Schltdl. (1848); Amorpha humilis Tausch (1838); Amorpha lewisii Lodd. ex Loudon (1839); Amorpha ludwigii K.Koch (1869); Amorpha macrophylla Raf. (1840); Amorpha mimosifolia Voss (1894); Amorpha nonperforata Schkuhr (1796); Amorpha occidentalis Abrams (1910); Amorpha ornata Wender. (1835); Amorpha pendula Carrière (1868); Amorpha perforata Schkuhr (1796); Amorpha pubescens Schltdl. (1851); Amorpha pumila Schltdl. (1848); Amorpha sensitiva Voss (1894); Amorpha tenesseensis Shuttlew. (1848); Amorpha verrucosa Raf. (1840); Amorpha virgata Small (1894); Monosemeion obliquatum Raf. (1840)

= Amorpha fruticosa =

Species of flowering plant in the pea family

Amorpha fruticosa is a species of flowering plant in the legume family Fabaceae, known by several common names, including desert false indigo, false indigo-bush, and bastard indigobush. It is native to North America.

== Description ==
Amorpha fruticosa is a perennial shrub. It grows as a glandular, thornless shrub which can reach 5 or 6 m (16 or 20 ft) in height and spread to twice that in width. It is somewhat variable in morphology. The leaves are made up of many hairy, oval-shaped, spine-tipped leaflets. The inflorescence is a spike-shaped raceme of many flowers, each with a single purple petal and ten protruding stamens with yellow anthers. The fruit is a legume pod containing one or two seeds.

== Distribution and habitat ==
The native range extends through much of the United States and south into Mexico. Its native habitats include stream and pond edges, open woods, roadsides and canyons.

The species has escaped cultivation elsewhere and is present as an introduced species in Europe, Asia, and other continents. It is often cultivated as an ornamental plant, and some wild populations may be descended from garden escapes.

== Chemistry ==
6'-O-β-D-glucopyranosyl-12a-hydroxydalpanol, a rotenoid, can be found in the fruits of A. fruticosa. Several members of the amorfrutin class of compounds have been isolated from the fruits. Amorfrutins as well as other secondary metabolites from A. fruticosa have displayed favorable bioactivities counteracting diabetes and the metabolic syndrome.

== Ecology ==
It is a larval host to the clouded sulphur, gray hairstreak, hoary edge, Io moth, marine blue, silver-spotted skipper, and southern dogface. The plentiful seeds are a food source for bobwhite quail. Both bees and butterflies use the flowers as a nectar source.

== Cultivars ==
- 'Albiflora', with white flowers
- 'Crispa', with curled leaves
- 'Lewisii', with narrow leaves
- 'Pendula', with arching branches, forming a dome shape
- var. angustifolia 'Dark Lance', with unusually dark purple flowers
