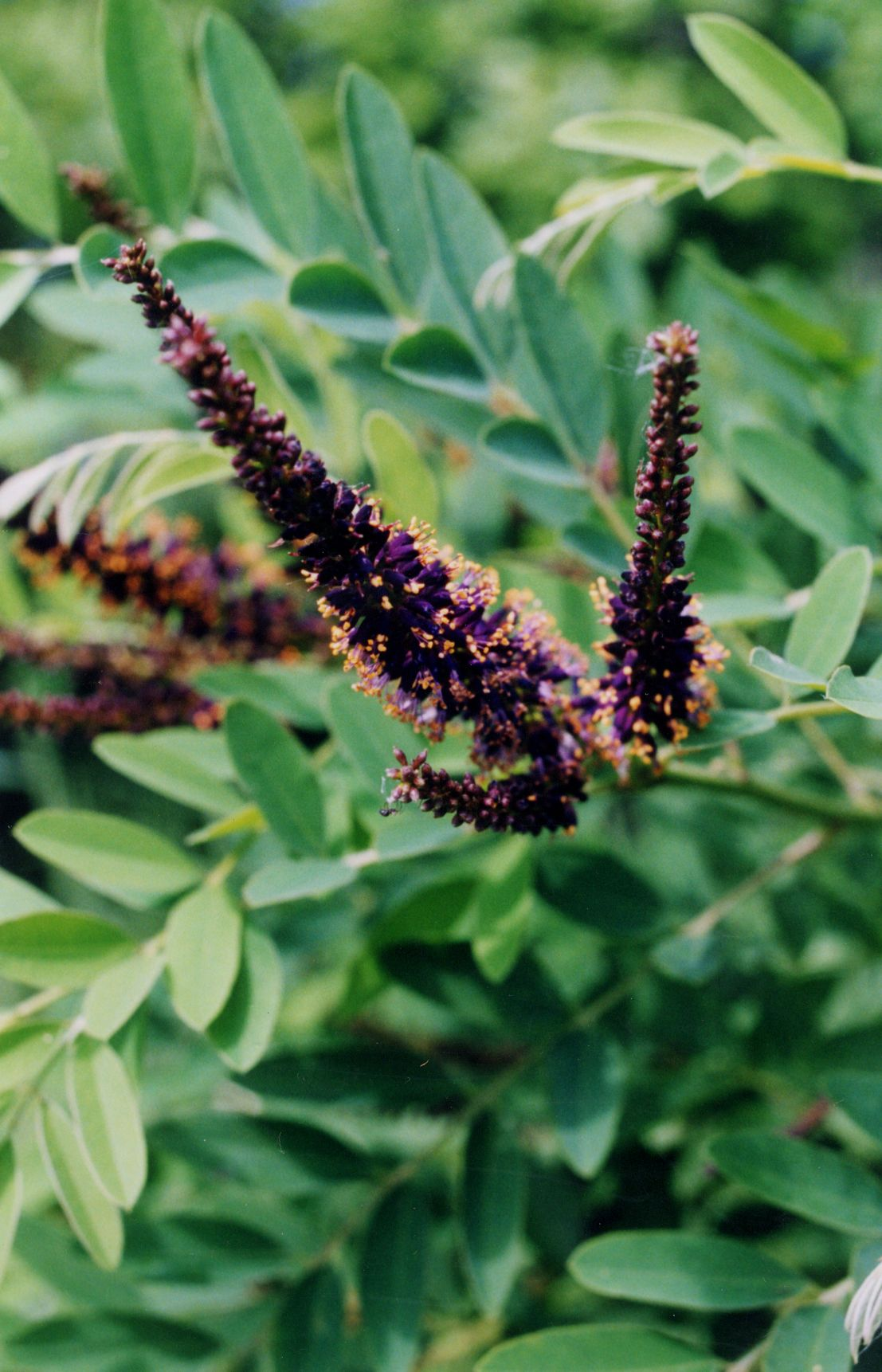
- Desert false indigo (Amorpha fruticosa)

Scientific classification
- Kingdom: Plantae
- Clade: Embryophytes
- Clade: Tracheophytes
- Clade: Angiosperms
- Clade: Eudicots
- Clade: Rosids
- Order: Fabales
- Family: Fabaceae
- Subfamily: Faboideae
- Tribe: Amorpheae
- Genus: Amorpha; L.

Species
- 21; see text

Synonyms
- Bonafidia Neck. (1790), opus utique oppr.; Monosemeion Raf. (1840)

= Amorpha =

Genus of legumes

Amorpha is a genus of plants in the pea family, Fabaceae. All the species are native to North America, from southern Canada, most of the United States (US), and northern Mexico. They are commonly known as false indigo. The name Amorpha means "deformed" or "without form" in Greek and was given because flowers of this genus only have one petal, unlike the usual "pea-shaped" flowers of the Faboideae subfamily. Amorpha is missing the wing and keel petals.

The desert false indigo or indigo bush (Amorpha fruticosa), is a shrub that grows from 3 m to 5 m tall. The species is considered a rare species in the US state of West Virginia and in the Canadian provinces of Manitoba and Ontario, but is considered an invasive plant in some areas of the northeastern and northwestern United States and in southeastern Canada, beyond its native range, and has also been introduced into Europe.

The lead plant (Amorpha canescens), a bushy shrub, is an important North American prairie legume. Lead plant is often associated with little bluestem (Schizachyrium scoparium), a common prairie grass. Native Americans used the dried leaves of lead plant for pipe smoking and tea.

Amorpha species are used as food plants by the larvae of some Lepidoptera species including Schinia lucens, which feeds exclusively on the genus.

Amorphol, a rotenoid bioside, can be isolated from plants of the genus Amorpha.

== Species ==
Amorpha comprises the following species:

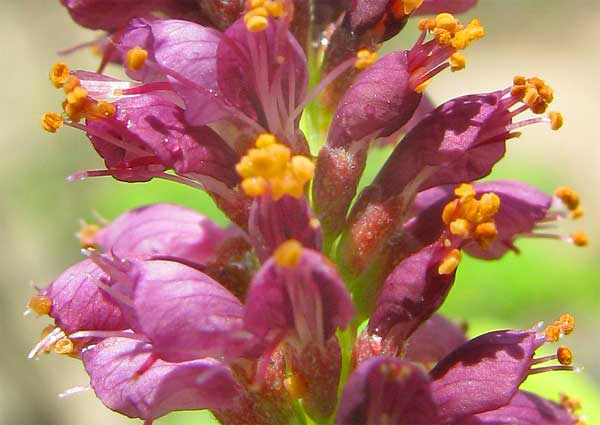
Flowers of Amorpha fruticosa

- Amorpha apiculata Wiggins — Baja California false indigo
- Amorpha arborea Schkuhr
- Amorpha californica Nutt. — California false indigo, mock locust
- Amorpha canescens Pursh — leadplant
- Amorpha confusa (Wilbur) S.C.K.Straub, Sorrie & Weakley
- Amorpha crenulata Rydb. — crenulate lead-plant
- Amorpha fruticosa L. — desert false indigo
- Amorpha georgiana Wilbur — Georgia false indigo
- Amorpha glabra Desf. ex Pers. — mountain false indigo
- Amorpha herbacea Walter — clusterspike false indigo
- Amorpha laevigata Nutt. — smooth false indigo
- Amorpha lutea Raf.
- Amorpha nana Nutt. — dwarf false indigo
- Amorpha nitens Boynton — shining false indigo
- Amorpha ouachitensis Wilbur — Ouachita false indigo
- Amorpha paniculata Torr. & A.Gray — panicled false indigo
- Amorpha rabiae Lex.
- Amorpha roemeriana Scheele — Roemer's false indigo
- Amorpha schwerinii C.K.Schneid. — Schwerin's false indigo
- Amorpha tomentosa Raf.

=== Species names with uncertain taxonomic status ===
The status of the following species is unresolved:

- Amorpha californica Nutt. ex Torr. & A.Gray
- Amorpha canescens Nutt.
- Amorpha crocea hort. ex Lavallée
- Amorpha dealbata hort. ex Lavallée
- Amorpha elatior hort. ex Lavallée
- Amorpha glabra Desf.
- Amorpha glabra Poir.
- Amorpha hispidula C.K.Schneid.
- Amorpha incana Engelm.
- Amorpha laevigata Nutt. ex Torr. & A.Gray

=== Hybrids ===
The following hybrid has been described:

- Amorpha × notha E.J.Palmer
