= Central Methodist Episcopal Church South =

Historic church in Arkansas, United States

- U.S. National Register of Historic Places
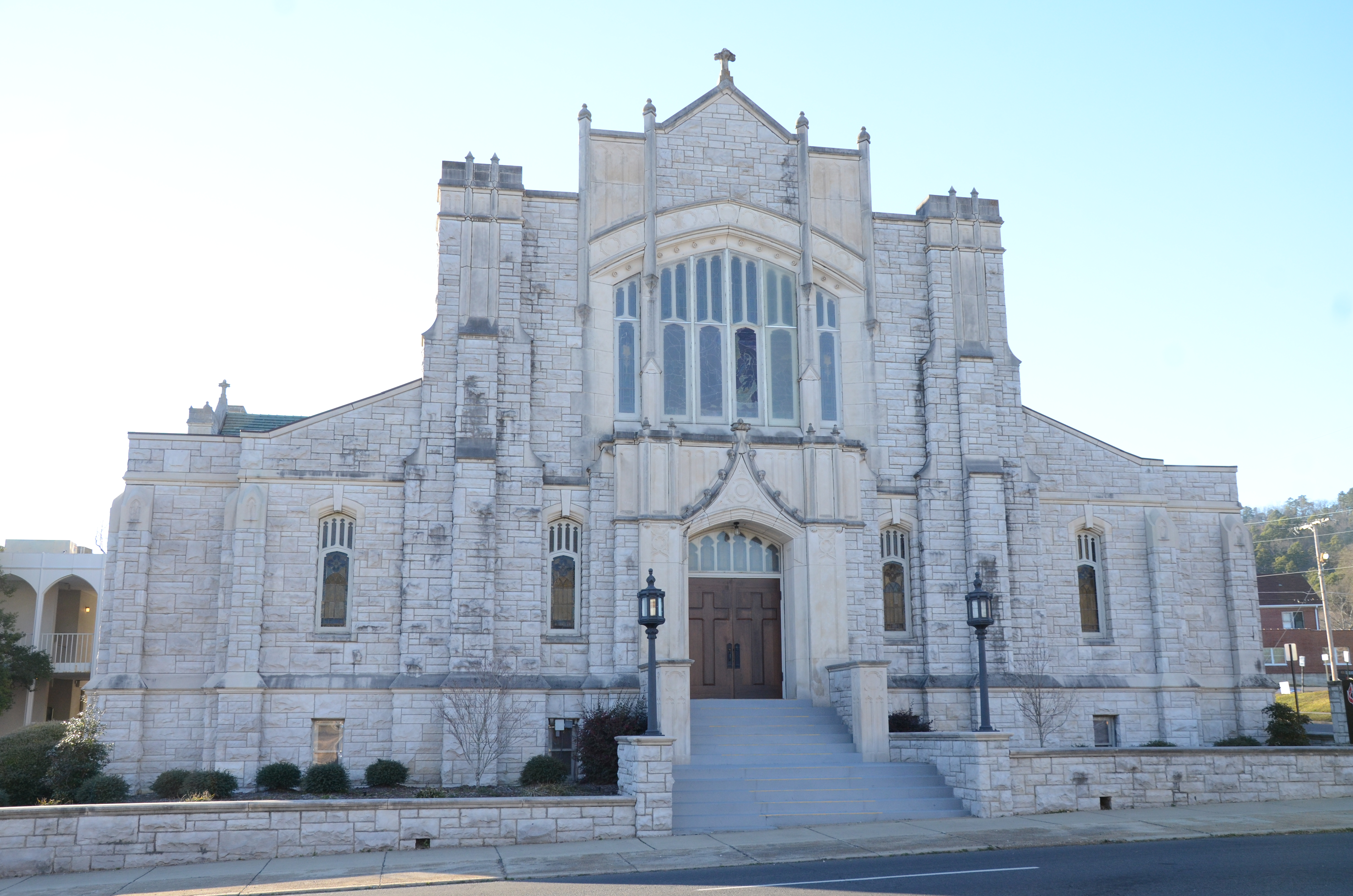

- Location within Arkansas Location within the United States
- Location: 1100 Central Ave., Hot Springs, Arkansas
- Coordinates: 34°30′17″N 93°3′20″W
- Area: less than one acre
- Built: 1914
- Architectural style: Gothic Revival
- NRHP reference No.: 11000689
- Added to NRHP: September 23, 2011

The Central Methodist Episcopal Church South, now the First United Methodist Church, is a historic church building at 1100 Central Avenue in Hot Springs, Arkansas. It is a single story masonry structure with a restrained Gothic Revival exterior, and elements of the Carpenter Gothic on the interior. It was designed by John Gaisford of Memphis, Tennessee, and was built in 1914-15 for a congregation established in 1852. The building is a distinctive landmark on the outskirts of the city's downtown area.

The church was listed on the National Register of Historic Places in 2011.

== See also ==
- First Methodist Church Christian Education Building
- National Register of Historic Places listings in Garland County, Arkansas
