= First Methodist Church Christian Education Building =

Historic church in Arkansas, United States

- U.S. National Register of Historic Places
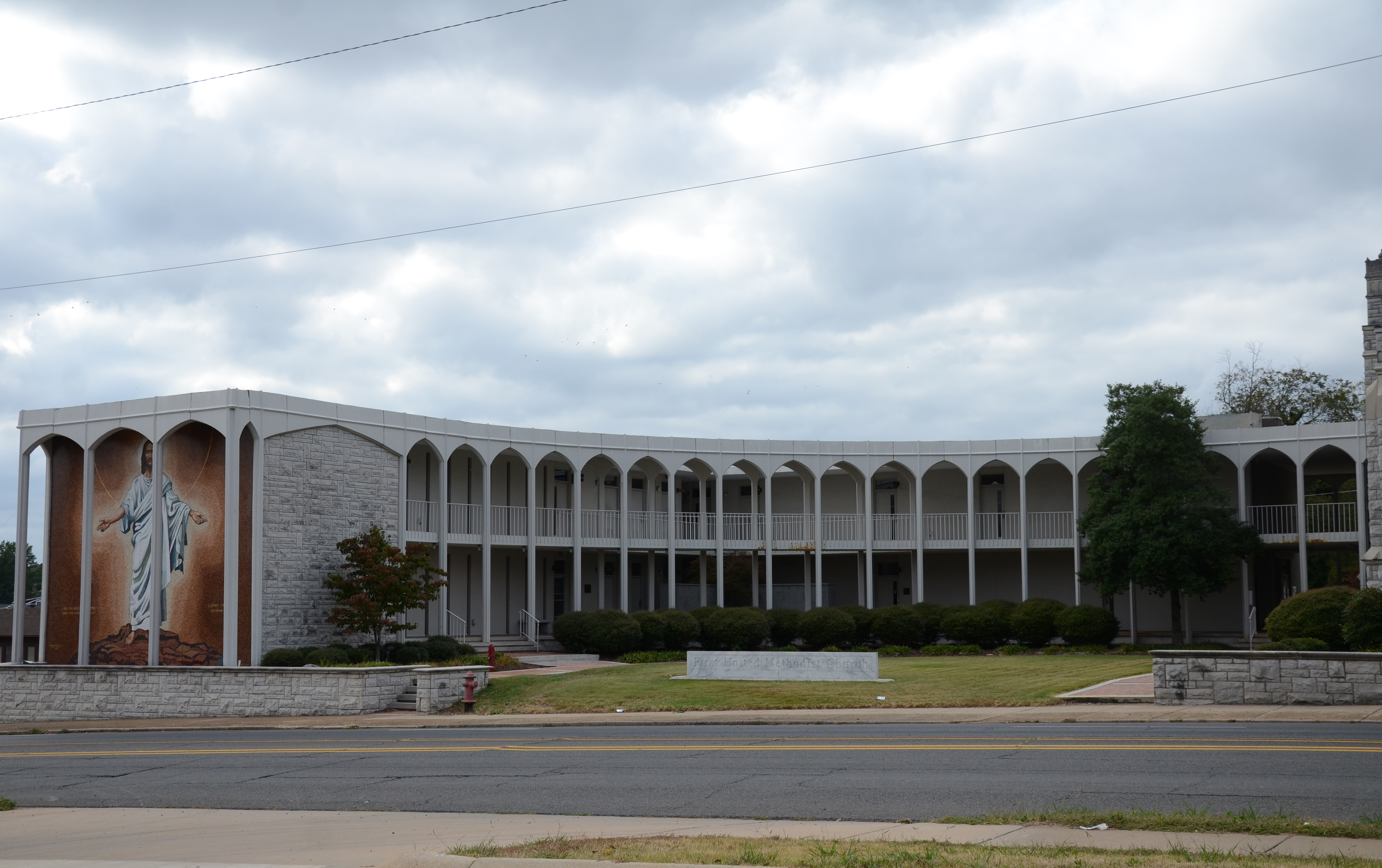

- Location within Arkansas Location within the United States
- Location: 1100 Central Ave., Hot Springs, Arkansas
- Coordinates: 34°30′18″N 93°3′19″W
- Area: less than one acre
- Built: 1965
- Architect: I. Granger McDaniel
- Architectural style: Mid-Century Modern
- NRHP reference No.: 16000317
- Added to NRHP: June 7, 2016

The First Methodist Church Christian Education Building is a historic religious educational facility at 1100 Central Avenue in Hot Springs, Arkansas. It is located just south of the First United Methodist Church. It is a two-story Modern L-shaped building, with the interior of the L defined by a curving two-story colonnade, which frames a small park between the southernmost part of the building and the adjacent church. The street-facing facade of the building is adorned by a mosaic depicting Jesus Christ. Built 1963–65 to a design to Arkansas architect I. Granger McDaniel, it is an excellent local example of Mid-Century Modern design.

The building was listed on the National Register of Historic Places in 2016.

== See also ==
- National Register of Historic Places listings in Garland County, Arkansas
