= Winding Stair Mountain National Recreation Area =

Protected area in Oklahoma, United States

- Location within the United States
- Location: Le Flore County, Oklahoma, U.S.
- Nearest city: Talihina, Oklahoma
- Coordinates: 34.7478798°N 94.7863413°W
- Area: 26,445 acres (10,702 ha)
- Established: October 18, 1988
- Governing body: United States Forest Service
- Website: http://www.fs.usda.gov/r08/ouachita

Winding Stair Mountain National Recreation Area is a United States national recreation area in the Ouachita National Forest. State Highway 1, known as the Talimena Scenic Byway in this area, bisects the recreation area. U. S. Highway 271 loops up through the summit. (Note: The elevation of the highway summit is 1,289 feet (393 m) above sea level.) Winding Stair Mountain National Recreation Area and the nearby Upper Kiamichi River and Black Fork Mountain Wilderness areas were created by an act of Congress on October 18, 1988.

The recreational area consists of 26,445 acres (107.02 km^{2}), comprising the Winding Stair Mountains, several campgrounds, an 85 acres (340,000 m^{2}) lake and many hiking trails. It lies mostly within LeFlore County, Oklahoma. A 45-mile (72 km) section of the Ouachita National Recreation Trail passes through the recreation area providing for diverse hiking opportunities. Other activities include camping, fishing, hunting, and hang-gliding.

== See also ==
- Talimena Scenic Drive
