= Caney Creek Wilderness =

Protected area in Arkansas, United States

- IUCN category Ib (wilderness area)
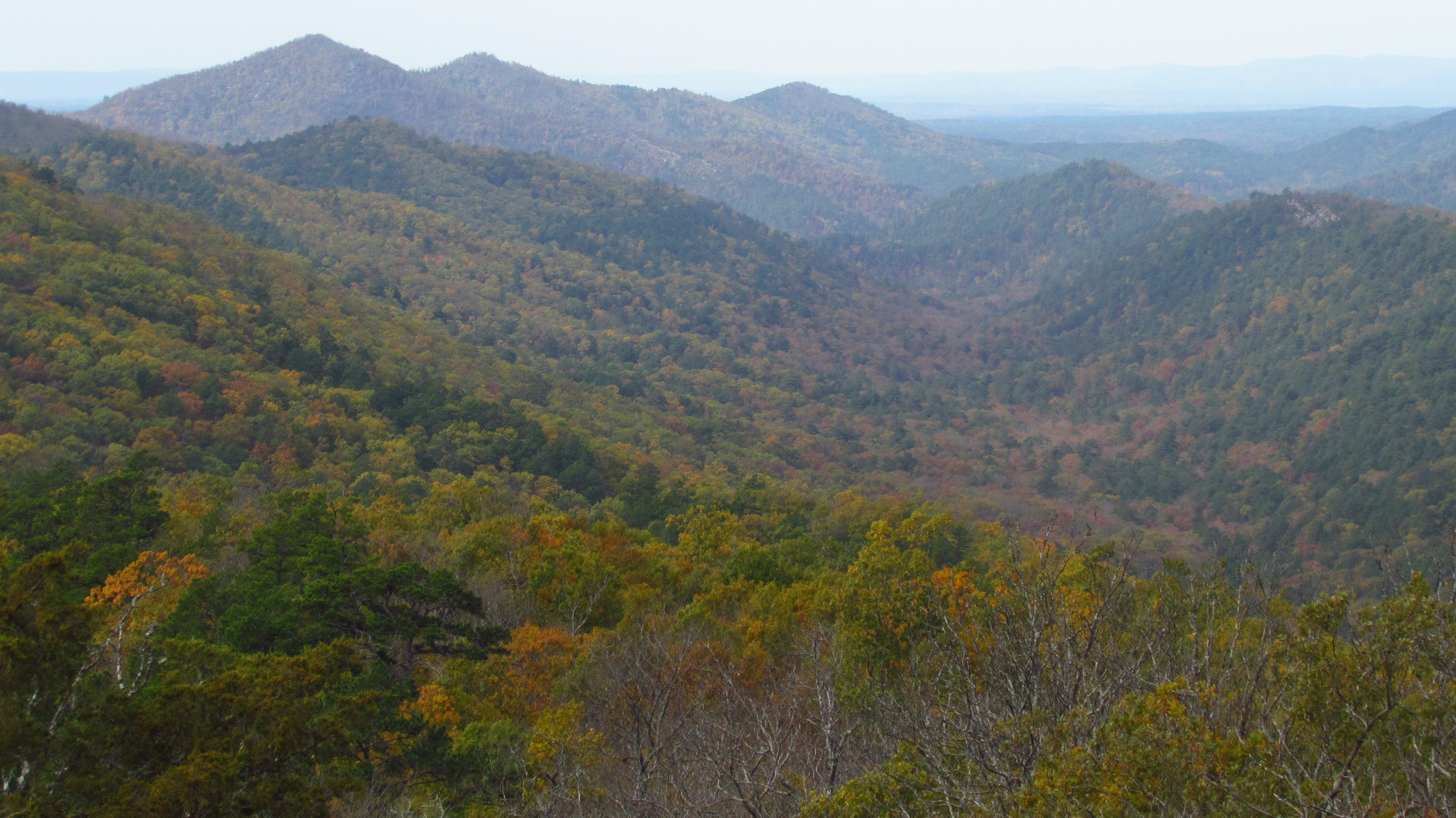

- Location within Arkansas Location within the United States
- Coordinates: 34.404399°N 94.069176°W
- Area: 14,460 acres (5,850 ha)
- Created: 1975

The Caney Creek Wilderness is a rugged 14,460-acre (58.5 km^{2}) segment of the Ouachita National Forest near the mountain town of Mena, Arkansas. It was designated by Congress in 1975 as the first wilderness area in Arkansas. The wilderness' main drainage and namesake, Caney Creek, winds through old-growth bottomland forest and is surrounded by tall, steep ridges, with the clear Cossatot River bordering the wilderness on the west side. The wilderness is known for exceptional air and water quality as well as virgin forest and excellent vistas.

== Scenery & Description ==
The Caney Creek Wilderness is located in the south-central range of the Ouachita Mountains of Arkansas and Oklahoma, an area characterized by swift flowing, clear mountain streams, dense and biodiverse forestland, sharp mountain peaks, and the most rainfall of anywhere in Arkansas. This rainfall contributes to high levels of biodiversity in the area, which was a major factor contributing to the protection of Caney Creek. The area is often covered in a mist that encourages high levels of moss and lichen growth on trees and bluffs. There are many waterfalls, side drainages, and springs within the area, including the 12-foot-tall Katy Falls which the Caney Creek Trail passes near. Wildlife is abundant in the area.

== Forest Composition & Biodiversity ==
The forests of the Wilderness Area are characterized by isolated disjuncts of Appalachian mixed mesophytic forests. The Wilderness Area contains extensive reserves of very old, unlogged virgin forest, quite rare in Arkansas. As such, there are many species uncommon to Arkansas within the forest composition, such as basswood, sugar maple, beech, mountain azalea, cucumber magnolia, bigleaf magnolia and umbrella magnolia. The bottomland forests around the creeks and rivers of the area are extremely biodiverse and contain 29 endangered species. The mountaintop forest consists of stunted, extremely old oak and hickory forests and vast sections of unlogged forest, with some trees upwards of 300 years old.

One major ridge within the wilderness, Porter Mountain, is home to a rare population of the Arkansas-endemic Maple-Leaf Oak (Quercus acerifolia). This species is only known to occur in 4 isolated locations in the Ouachita Mountains, and is listed as Critically Imperiled by the state of Arkansas and Endangered by the IUCN Red List.

== Trails & Access ==
Access is free and open to all, however, visitors should expect near-complete solitude and very rugged, rough terrain. There are three trails within the wilderness: the Caney Creek Trail, the Buckeye Vista Trail, and the Tall Peak Trail.

The Caney Creek Trail is a 9.6 mile out and back trail that generally follows the Caney Creek drainage and visits many biodiverse and old-growth forested areas. Water is abundant on this trail, but it often floods after heavy rains.

The Buckeye Vista Trail is a shorter 4.7 mile trail that rises from the center of the Caney Creek drainage up to the top of Buckeye Mountain for views of the forest and surrounding landscape. The top of this ridge has reserves of old-growth oak and hickory forest. Half of the Caney Creek Trail, the Buckeye Vista Trail, and a short section of forest road can be combined to form a 10.5 mile loop.

The Tall Peak Trail climbs 1,500 feet over 3.2 miles to visit a high mountain CCC tower outside of the wilderness. The tower overlooks the surrounding watersheds and wilderness.

As with most wilderness areas, all trails are very secluded and offer no emergency services. They are rugged and only those prepared and physically fit should attempt them.

== See also ==
- List of U.S. Wilderness Areas
