= Prairie spiderwort =

Prairie spiderwort is a common name for several plants and may refer to:

- Tradescantia bracteata
- Tradescantia occidentalis
