= Beech Creek National Scenic Area =

Scenic area in Oklahoma, US

- Location within the United States
- Location: Le Flore County, Oklahoma, U.S.
- Nearest city: Heavener, Oklahoma
- Coordinates: 34.58333°N 94.51667°W
- Area: 7,500 acres (30 km^{2})
- Established: 1988, expanded and designated National Scenic Area 2007
- Governing body: U.S. Forest Service

Beech Creek National Scenic Area is a federally designated National Scenic Area within Ouachita National Forest. It is 6 miles (9.7 km) east and 5 miles (8.0 km)south of the unincorporated community of Big Cedar in Le Flore County, Oklahoma, U.S. The 7,500-acre (30 km^{2}) scenic area is administered by the U.S. Forest Service, a part of the U.S. Department of Agriculture. The scenic area includes 32 miles (51 km) of hiking trails, some on former roads (for updated status of trail system, see comments below). The original designated area, the Beech Creek Botanical Area, remains, conserving mature beech trees near the headwaters of Beech Creek.

The National Scenic Area was established by Public Law 100–499, known as the "Winding Stair Mountain National Recreation Area and Wilderness Area Act", designating about 400 acres (160 ha) as the Beech Creek Botanical Area in 1988, and was expanded and designated Beech Creek National Scenic Area in 2007.

The Beech Creek Trail System was originally built in the 1990s as a cooperative effort between the Oklahoma Chapter of the Sierra Club and the US Forest Service as an effort to make the Beech Creek Scenic and Botanical Area accessible to hikers. The following description of the trail system as a 32-mile system, while correct when the trail system was originally built, is no longer accurate. As of 2024, the trail system has not been maintained for years and is abandoned. The trails are overgrown and the trail markers are mostly non-visible. The Beech Creek Trail trailhead marker which was at the end of K68A has been removed and the start of the trail is no longer visible. Forest Road K68A is no longer passible by vehicles due to erosion and particularly due to total washouts of the two large culverts over Beech Creek and Turkey Snout Creek in the early 2000s which were never rebuilt by the US Forest Service. (Chris Corbett, Oklahoma Sierra Club, personal observation in 2024). No longer accurate: "The trail system totals about 32 miles (51 km), with several different sections and varying degrees of difficulty for hikers.":

== Trail ratings ==
The U.S. Forest Service rates the trails as follows:

- Beech Creek Trail generally follows Beech Creek, sometimes at the edge and sometimes farther away. It is considered an easy trail for 2.5 miles (4.0 km) from the end of Forest Road K68A to the area known as the "Cascades".
- Turkey Snout Loop follows a small tributary of Beech Creek, over relatively rugged terrain. It is not recommended for inexperienced backpackers.
- Walnut Mountain Loop is suitable for experienced backpackers.
- Blue Bouncer Loop is the most difficult hike and is recommended for experienced backpackers.

== Facilities ==
There are no restrooms along the trails nor are there any campsites. Campsites exist at Billy Creek and at Winding Stair Mountain National Recreation Area. Motorized vehicles and either pack or saddle animals are prohibited on the trails. Mountain bikes are not prohibited, but may be difficult to use, because the trails are very narrow. Roads are all covered with gravel
