= Ouachita National Recreation Trail =

Hiking trail through the Ouachita Mountains of Oklahoma and Arkansas

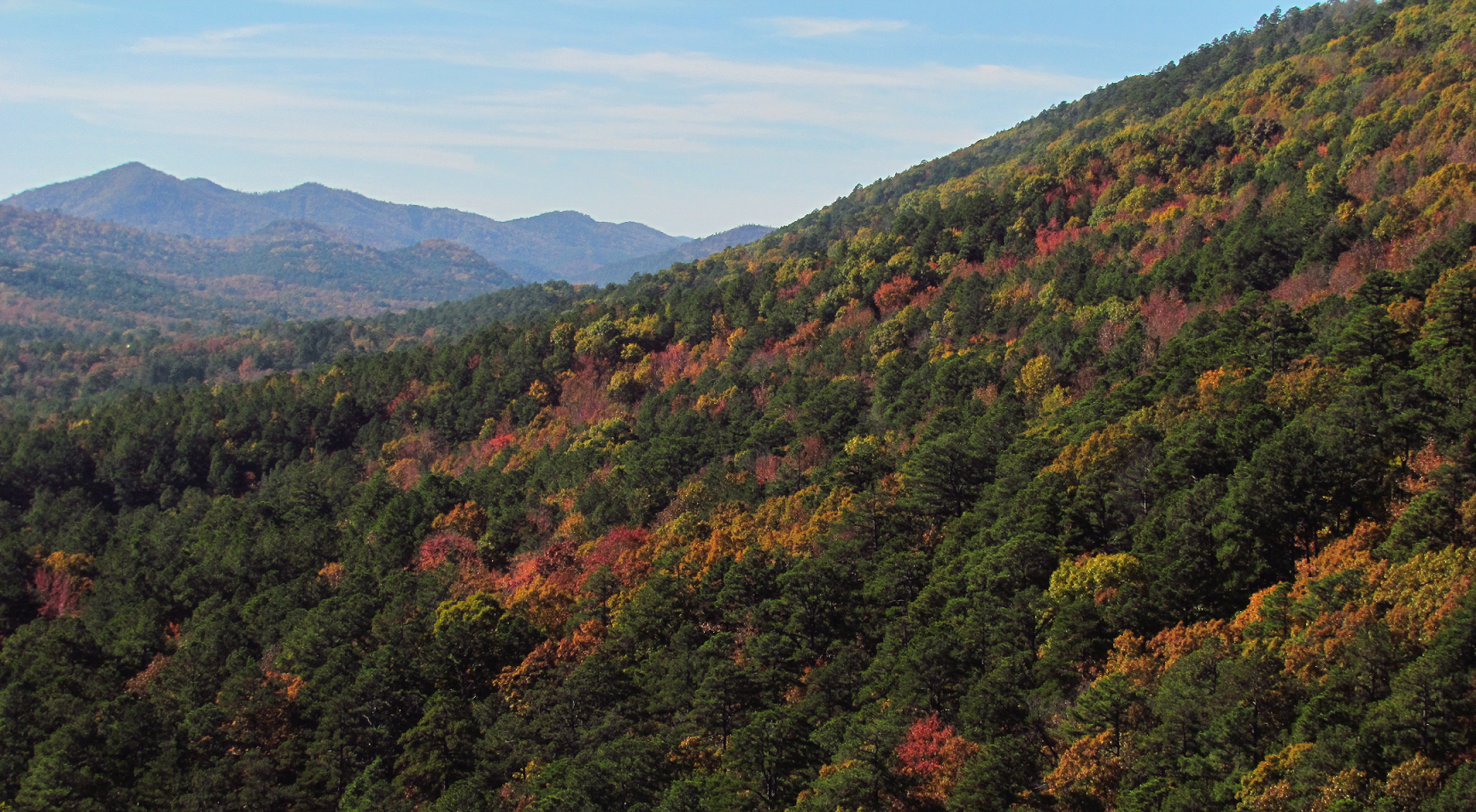
- Sugar Creek Vista, AR
- Length: 223 mi (359 km)
- Location: Ouachita Mountains
- Designation: National Recreation Trail
- Trailheads: Pinnacle Mountain State Park, Arkansas; Talimena State Park, Oklahoma
- Use: Hiking; Mountain biking (partial)
- Difficulty: Varies
- Season: Year-round
- Waymark: Blue blaze
- Hazards: Water can be scarce in summer
- Maintainer: Ouachita National Forest
- Website: http://www.fs.usda.gov/r08/ouachita

Ouachita National Recreation Trail is a 223-mile (359 km) long, continuous hiking trail through the Ouachita Mountains of Oklahoma and Arkansas. It is the longest backpacking trail in the Ouachita National Forest, spanning 192 miles across its length. Approximately 177 miles of the trail is in Arkansas and 46 miles of the trail is in Oklahoma. The trail is used by hikers, backpackers, hunters, and mountain bikers. It is a non-motorized single track trail open only to foot traffic and partially open to mountain bicycles. Segments opened to mountain bikes are from the western terminus of the Ouachita Trail at Talimena State Park to the Big Cedar trailhead on US Highway 259 at approximately Mile Marker (MM) 30.5 in Oklahoma, and from the Talimena Scenic Drive Trailhead at MM 54.1, east to Highway 7 at mile 160.4, north of Jessieville, Arkansas.

== General information ==
The trail's western end is at Talimena State Park in southeastern Oklahoma, and the eastern end is at Pinnacle Mountain State Park in the small community of Natural Steps, Arkansas in central Arkansas. The first 192 miles (309 km) lie within the Ouachita National Forest; the remaining 31 miles (50 km), maintained by Pinnacle Mountain State Park, traverse lands owned by timber companies and Central Arkansas Water. (Plans for the Arkansas River Trail include an extension connecting the eastern terminus of the Ouachita Trail to downtown Little Rock 17 miles (27 km) away.) The trail passes through parts of eight counties in Arkansas and one in Oklahoma. From east to west they are Pulaski, Perry, Saline, Garland, Montgomery, Yell, Scott, and Polk, in Arkansas, and Le Flore County in Oklahoma, where the trail ends. At several locations the trail switches back between two counties. Scott County actually has very little of the trail, with a couple of small corners of the county traversed.

There are two federally designated wilderness areas that the Ouachita Trail passes through: the Flatside Wilderness Area in Perry and Saline Counties in Arkansas and the Upper Kiamichi River Wilderness Area in Le Flore County, Oklahoma.

The Friends of the Ouachita Trail is a volunteer group devoted to maintaining the trail. (https://friendsoftheouachita.org/wp/)

While well-maintained, the trail is lightly used. In a ranking of U.S. long-distance trails on a number of criteria by Backpacker Magazine, the trail ranked third for solitude and fourth for signage.

The high point on the trail is 2,610 ft (800 m) on Rich Mountain, which straddles the Oklahoma-Arkansas state border 46 miles (74 km) from the western end of the trail. The low point is 270 ft (82 m) at the entrance to Pinnacle Mountain State Park on the eastern end of the trail.

Because of the low elevations and southern latitude, the best times to hike the trail are the early spring and late autumn; winter months are often warm enough, also. In July to September, the weather tends to be too hot to hike comfortably, and water access points tend to dry up.

The trail meets the 37.8-mile Womble Trail north of the community of Story, Arkansas. [1]

=== Big Maumelle River, AR 300 Truss Bridge ===
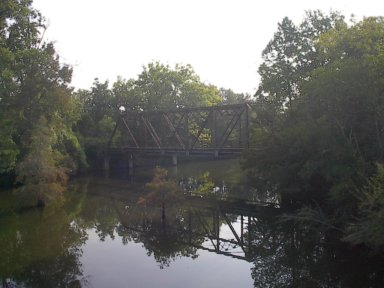
Bridge on the Ouachita Trail

In the 1920s, a one-lane truss bridge was built on the old Highway 300 to cross the Big Maumelle River (34°51′05″N 92°29′00″W). It is on the list of Historic Bridges of the United States (Maumelle River AR 300 Bridge) for Pulaski County, Arkansas. The bridge still stands in the shadow of Pinnacle Mountain, but was made obsolete by a new bridge in 1981. Today, it is only open to pedestrians for fishing and is part of the 223-mile (359 km) long Ouachita National Recreation Trail.

== History and development ==
The Title of "Father of the Ouachita Trail" is given to Arthur P. Cowley, a former Public Information Officer of the Ouachita National Forest. Cowley graduated from the University of Missouri with a BS degree in Forestry and began working for the US Forest Service in 1954. Also he received a Master's Degree in Education from the University of Arkansas in 1978. In the early 1970s Cowley was instrumental in developing the Forest Service's plan for the Ouachita Trail. As a Recreation Staff Specialist with the US Forest Service in Hot Springs, he assisted in the first phases of construction of the Ouachita Trail. He handled trail planning and coordination of trail construction on the forest from 1965 until 1979 when he moved to California as Public Information Officer and later became the Big Tree Coordinator for the Sequoia National Forest.

During his time in Arkansas, Cowley served as President of the Society of American Foresters, 1977-78 President of the Arkansas Recreation and Parks Association and Vice Chairman of the Arkansas Trails Council. He also helped formulate Training Resources in Environmental Education (TREE) and received numerous awards, including the 1974 Arkansas Wildlife Federation's "Forester of the Year" award. He retired from the US Forest Service in 1988.

Cowley died on Mar 4, 2010, just one year prior to the 40th anniversary of the completion of the initial sections and opening of the trail. An Arkansas Trails Day event was held at the original Eastern Terminus (34°52′17″N 92°49′15″W) at Lake Sylvia Trailhead in Perry County, Arkansas on Saturday, May 7, 2011. Cowley's contributions were honored with a bench and plaque. His surviving wife Maureen and numerous family members were in attendance.

Construction of the trail began in May 1971 and was completed by 1981. Mr. Jim Rawlins completed the first documented through hike of the Ouachita Trail in 1983. He also authored the first trail guide "A Hiker's Guide to the Ouachita National Recreation Trail.".

== Points on the trail ==
- Talimena State Park
- Talimena Scenic Drive (Oklahoma State Highway 1)
- Upper Kiamichi River Wilderness
- Winding Stair Mountain National Recreation Area
- Queen Wilhelmina State Park
- U.S. Route 71
- Big Brushy Recreation Area
- U.S. Route 270
- Iron Springs Recreation Area
- Arkansas State Highway 27
- Arkansas State Highway 7
- Flatside Wilderness
- Lake Sylvia Recreation Area
- Arkansas State Highway 9
- Lake Maumelle
- Arkansas State Highway 10
- Lunsford Corner, AR
- Arkansas Highway 300
- Pinnacle Mountain State Park
- Natural Steps, Arkansas

== Shelters along the trail ==
The nine original shelters along the eastern portion of the trail were built by the United States Forest Service (USFS) in the 1980s and 1990s. In 2013, Friends of the Ouachita Trail (FoOT) embarked on a program to build additional shelters along the remainder of the trail, with a goal of having shelters evenly spaced throughout.

Shelter Name	MM (Mile Marker)	Coordinates	Original builder	Original open date	Remarks
Rock Garden	9.4	34°46.387′N 94°51.799′W	FoOT	November 2013	
Holson Valley Vista	16.8	34°44.799′N 94°46.076′W	FoOT	November 2013	
Winding Stairs Mountain	25.0	34°42.561′N 94°40.645′W	FoOT	April 2013	
Pashubbe	34.0	34°39.745′N 94°36.252′W	FoOT	June 2013	
State Line	46.4	34°41.572′N 94°27.119′W	FoOT	October 2014	
Black Fork Mountain	57.8	34°41.437′N 94°18.624′W	FoOT	May 2015	
Foran Gap	68.9	34°41.181′N 94°10.472′W	FoOT	March 2013	
Turner Gap	79.9	34°40.584′N 94°0.713′W	FoOT	September 2016	
Brushy Creek Mountain	90.6	34°40.124′N 93°51.396′W	FoOT	May 2015	
Fiddler Creek	100.9	34°41.523′N 93°43.315′W	FoOT	March 2014	
Suck Mountain	108.6	34°43.463′N 93°37.721′W	FoOT	November 2016	
Story Creek	116.7	34°43.463′N 93°32.376′W	FoOT	October 2016	
John Archer	122.6	34°45.065′N 93°29.113′W	USFS		
Uncle Bill Potter	127.5	34°44.590′N 93°25.402′W	USFS		Short hike downhill to Iron Forks Creek bottom.
Big Branch	134.0	34°44.007′N 93°21.385′W	USFS		Short hike downhill.
Blue Mountain	143.2	34°43.089′N 93°17.414′W	USFS		
Big Bear	150.8	34°43.444′N 93°11.382′W	USFS		
Moonshine	158.4	34°45.913′N 93°6.401′W	USFS		
Oak Mountain	167.4	34°49.174′N 93°1.983′W	USFS		
Brown's Creek	182.5	34°52.429′N 92°52.129′W	USFS		
Nancy Mountain	189.5	34°51.145′N 92°47.706′W	USFS		

== See also ==
- Long-distance trails in the United States
