= Flight 655 =

Flight 655 may refer to:

- Texas International Airlines Flight 655, crashed on 27 September 1973
- Iran Air Flight 655, shot down on 3 July 1988
