= Katy Falls =

- Interactive map of Katy Falls
- Location: Caney Creek Wilderness; Ouachita National Forest, Arkansas
- Coordinates: 34°23′49″N 94°04′49″W
- Type: Waterfall
- Total height: 12 ft
- Watercourse: Caney Creek

Katy Falls in the Caney Creek Wilderness is a 12-foot waterfall in the Ouachita National Forest.

Katy Falls is on a spur near where the Buckeye Trail joins the Caney Creek Trail. Also nearby is the mouth of Katy Creek, where it flows into Caney Creek.
