= Natural Steps, Arkansas =

Natural Steps
- Census-designated place
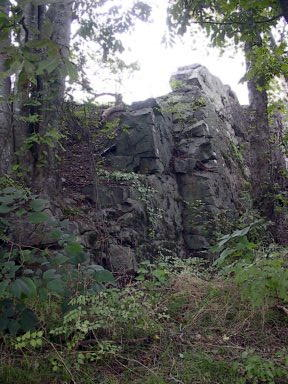

- Location of Natural Steps in Pulaski County, Arkansas.

- Location within the state of Arkansas
- Coordinates: 34°52′23″N 92°29′53″W
- Country: United States
- State: Arkansas
- County: Pulaski
- Founded: 1822

Area
  - Total: 3.56 sq mi (9.22 km^{2})
  - Land: 2.76 sq mi (7.15 km^{2})
  - Water: 0.80 sq mi (2.07 km^{2})
- Elevation: 446 ft (136 m)

Population (2020)
  - Total: 413
  - Density: 149.6/sq mi (57.78/km^{2})
- FIPS code: 05-48680
- GNIS feature ID: 2582919

Natural Steps is an unincorporated census-designated place in Pulaski County, Arkansas, United States. It is located 18 miles (29 km) northwest of Little Rock along the southern bank of the Arkansas River, on Arkansas Highway 300. Per the 2020 census, the population was 413. Today, it is a small farming community with scattered businesses. Most of the natural steps, a geologic formation, still stand today and are used as a marker for river runners. The Natural Steps are not open to the public for viewing.

== Demographics ==
Historical population
Census	Pop.	Note	%±
2010	426		—
2020	413		−3.1%
U.S. Decennial Census; 2010 2020

=== 2020 census ===
Natural Steps CDP, Arkansas – Racial and ethnic composition Note: the U.S. census treats Hispanic/Latino as an ethnic category. This table excludes Latinos from the racial categories and assigns them to a separate category. Hispanics/Latinos may be of any race.
Race / Ethnicity (NH = Non-Hispanic)	Pop 2010	Pop 2020	% 2010	% 2020
White alone (NH)	398	355	93.43%	85.96%
Black or African American alone (NH)	16	12	3.76%	2.91%
Native American or Alaska Native alone (NH)	2	1	0.47%	0.24%
Asian alone (NH)	2	1	0.47%	0.24%
Pacific Islander alone (NH)	0	0	0.00%	0.00%
Some Other Race alone (NH)	0	3	0.00%	0.73%
Mixed Race/Multi-Racial (NH)	2	18	0.47%	4.36%
Hispanic or Latino (any race)	6	23	1.41%	5.57%
Total	426	413	100.00%	100.00%

== History ==
The small town was named after "two perfectly parallel vertical walls of sandstone, twenty feet apart, [that] jut out from the disintegrated soft slates, in prominent conformity, descending steplike, fifty-one feet from the top of the bank, where they first show themselves, to the edge of the lowest water-mark of the Arkansas River, and can be seen running their course beneath the stream. These form a conspicuous landmark to boatman and travelers on the Arkansas River, and are known under the name of the "Natural Steps". Beginning in 1822, the local "Natural Steps" provided a convenient stop for Little Rock visitors to disembark for their hike to the mountain."

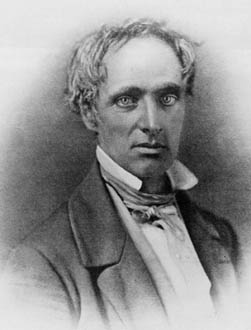
David Dale Owen

The Natural Steps were first written about and drawn by David Dale Owen (Principal Geologist) in his Second Report of a Geological Reconnaissance of the Middle and Southern Counties of Arkansas (1859) ordered by Elias Nelson Conway, Governor of Arkansas. He wrote:

In sight of the Pinnacle (Pinnacle Mountain State Park) on the Arkansas River, near the mouth of the Big Maumelle, are "The Natural Steps". I found to be forty feet above the Arkansas River, at its stage when I examined and sketched them, on May 30, 1859, but they are fifty-one feet above low-water mark. Seen from the River at a little distance, they have a wonderfully artificial appearance, looking like steps laid by regular masonry, and form, indeed, not only a remarkable feature in the landscape, but also a striking and unequivocal instance, of which Arkansas furnishes several, of strata tilted nearly on edge.

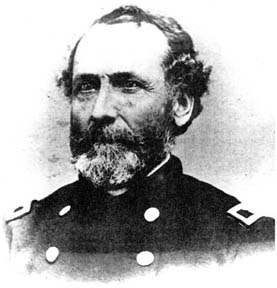
Col. John Navarre Macomb

In 1870, United States Army Corps of Engineers Col. John Navarre Macomb, along with Assistant Engineer S.T. Abert, set out to map the Arkansas River and show low-water depths and other features important to river travel across the channel. In their maps, a drawing and the location of the "Natural Steps" were included.

=== Native Americans ===
Fred O. Henker, M.D. wrote, "The first inhabitants of the Natural Steps area were Native Americans, Indians whose presence in the vicinity dates back possibly 10,000 years." During early European explorations and the colonial period, local Native Americans, from about 1500 to the late 1700s, were the Quapaw, which translates to "down stream people".

Naturalist Thomas Nuttall wrote A Journal of Travels into the Arkansas Territory During the Year 1819 based on his travels from 1819–1821 to study botany along the Arkansas River. He also observed the Quapaw and other Native Americans. "A number of families were now about to settle, or rather take provisionary possession of the land purchased from the Osage, situated along the banks of the Arkansas, from Frog bayou to the falls of the Verdigris ..." Nuttall's travels took him to the mouth of the Verdigris River.

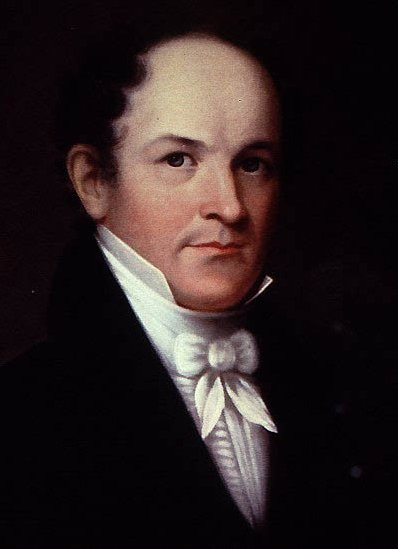
Thomas Nuttall

Thomas Nuttall found few Native Americans in the Natural Steps area in 1819.

=== French explorers ===
The Pinnacle Mountain Community Post wrote:

History reveals the French were notorious traders with the Natives and perhaps many canoe or river raft pulled up and tied off in the area. Word has it that Bernard de la Harpe spent some time in the area. The French explorers were coming down the river and when they rounded the bend, right near Palarm Creek, they named the twin peaks of Pinnacle Mountain Maumelle, which is French for a woman's breasts.

=== Steamboat landing ===
The Natural Steps used to be famous for providing a landing for boatloads of picnickers that went up and down the Arkansas River in steamboats during the 19th century. "Natural Steps was a natural port with water at the bank of sufficient depth to enable convenient docking, and sufficient population to provide passengers and cargo. By 1849 the Arkansas Gazette reported fifteen to twenty steamboat arrivals and departures weekly."

On May 19, 1878, the Arkansas Gazette reported:

The excursion yesterday to Natural Steps on the steamer Maumelle under the auspices of the M.E. church and the management of its popular pastor, Rev. A.W. Decker, and Gen. Henry Rudd, was a great success, both pecuniarily and pleasurably. The boat left Little Rock promptly at 8:30 a.m. and after traversing our beautiful river, with its varied and picturesque scenery for about thirty miles duly reached its point of destination, the Natural Steps, where the excursionists disembarked and sought the shady groves in the vicinity, where they indulged in picnicking in the true and time-honored style; after when the Natural Steps were duly inspected and climbed and such getting up stairs you never did see.

A riverboat pilot on the Arkansas River in the late 19th century, R. E. Cross, wrote in 1938:

For years and years I rafted timber from Dardanelle and points below, to the old Freeman Lumber Company at Gleason, Ark., and to the Beebe Stave Company, located a few miles below Little Rock. There once lived a Dr. Moreland at Natural Steps who had a farm and a cotton gin, and in whose cottonseed house we slept many, many times after landing near Scott eddy. We cooked many a savory supper and breakfast in that old gin-lot. We would each dig a hole in the cottonseed and crawl in, wet clothes and all, and we slept very well.

Steamer Maumelle ticket (January 26, 1878), Natural Steps

Later, cotton, corn and firewood were shipped from the steamboat landing at Natural Steps.

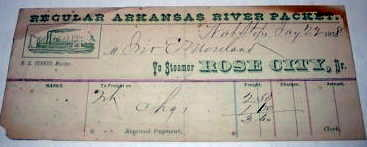
Steamer Rose City ticket (January 22, 1878), Natural Steps

=== Battle of Palarm ===
This was a battle that began with the Brooks–Baxter War and occurred on the stern-wheel steamboat Hallie on May 8, 1874. Palarm is a small community on the north side of the Arkansas River from Natural Steps.

Robert W. Meriwether of the Faulkner County Historical Society wrote:

After stopping at Natural Steps to take on fuel wood, the "Hallie" was proceeding upstream. Suddenly a "terrific volley" of shots was fired at the steamer from behind rocks along the northern (eastern) bank of the river near Palarm. The Hallie Rifles returned the fire. The shooting continued for ten to fifteen minutes. One stray bullet pierced the supply pipe between the vessel's boiler and engine, thus cutting off its power, and the boat drifted downriver, out of gun range, and lodged on the southern (western) shore. The boat's captain, a pilot, and one rifleman were killed; the other pilot and three or four riflemen were wounded. One source stated that the Brooks regiment suffered one man killed and three wounded; another report was that five men were killed and "quite a number" wounded.

== Ancient fort ==
THE BENEDICT MANUSCRIPT

Written by R.W. Benedict, circa 1880:

Discovery of Antiquarian Relics at Natural Steps, Pulaski County, Arkansas on South Side River

About the year 1820 my father and family settled at Natural Steps, making a purchase of an improvement on public lands, of a Quapaw Indian named Heinman. I, at that time was about 8 years old and the events, that I am now to relate, are my own recollections and observations. About the year 1821, General Nix (General John Nicks) of the United States Army, was proceeding up the Arkansas river to supersede General (William) Bradford in the Indian Country of the far west, and to establish the military post of Fort Gibson. He was traveling in 3 Keel Boats, loaded with troops and Supplies (there being no Steamboats in those days). In passing our home, General Nix being an old acquaintance of my father John C. Benedict, stopped off to see his old friend. Previous to his arrival we had discovered, that upon the Spot where we were living, there had evidently been a Fort of great antiquity, and unknown to history. We invited the attention of General Nix to our discovery and after making a thorough examination, he pronounced the ruins to be unquestionably those of a very ancient raised Fort. Every evidence existed corroborative of the fact, that away back in the past centuries, there had been an important Fortification at this place, and that there had been a terrible fight engaged in, either at its capitulation and destruction, or at some time previous. The four walls of the fortification were still plainly visible, and their outlines well defined – and General Nix stepped their straight lines in measuring them. That this Fort must have been of great antiquity was evidenced by the fact that at this time immense trees were growing in the area inside the walls. Wild cherry trees, full 2 feet (0.61 m) in diameter, and 50 or 60 feet (18 m) to their first branches and as straight as an arrow. The walls were built of rock, and from the quantity of them these walls must have been of great size, but they were now torn down and covered with debris. In the immediate vicinity of the Fort, on a high elevation and far above any possible chance of overflow, there was to be seen a large excavation, now become a pond, grown up with "Menockonock" weeds and other water plants. All the surroundings proved that this excavation was of great age, contemporary with that of the Fort, and from its situation on the high lands, it could have been made but for one purpose, and that to procure the material for the embankment of the fort, or else a water receptacle for the uses of the Fort. Outside of the walls, and along the bank of the river, we found immense quantities of "Mashed or flattened bullets", of various sizes and shapes, indicating that they had been shot into something, evidently the stone walls of the Fort, and had been mashed by the contact. Here were also found Stone Hatchets, and arrowheads, all pointing unmistakably to the conclusion that a sanguinary battle had been fought here at sometime. Inside of the walls, while plowing, we found great quantities of lead that had been melted, and also an immense Indian Axe of solid stone, perfect in form, save that the handle had been broken off. This was a very interesting relic, and affords room for much thought and conjecture, as it was of extraordinary size, and uncommon shape, being four times as large as anything of the kind we had ever seen before or since. Nothing of its form had ever been seen in this country before, and the verdict of all was that it must have been brought from some far-off country, by an invading force. In or about the Fort was also found another most remarkable relic, which was "a solid piece of Brass", weighing exactly 5 pounds, 5 or 6 inches (150 mm) long, square in shape, having on either of its four sides, three distinct deep impressions about the size and shape of an old fashioned watch case, the centre impressions being the largest, and on either end a similar impression covering the entire end, save a margin on the outside. All of these impressions were of like shape, only differing in size. No letters, or characters appeared thereon, but perfectly smooth surfaces, save the impressions spoken of. This brass nugget, was examined by many of the most scientific men of Arkansas, in that day, and none were ever able to throw any light on it, as to whence it came, or for what purposes it could have been utilized. It remained in my father's possession for many years, he always having refused to dispose of it, though frequently urged to do so, and it finally very mysteriously disappeared, and we could never get any trace of it.

About four miles above this spot, one Joshua Chandler found a piece, or rather a slab, of lead of peculiar shape, and singularly situated. It was found about 18 feet (5.5 m) under what appeared to be the virgin soil, which had been some distance from the river bank, but the wash and caving for many years had reached it, and when found its edge was alone discernible, protruding from the washed bank. Upon excavating it, he found it to be a slab of lead, smooth on the faces and edges, about 8 by 14 inches (360 mm) in size, 2 inches thick, and weighing exactly 77 pounds. I remember the weight distinctly, as Chandler carried it to Little Rock and sold it to Joseph Henderson, a merchant, who was a brother-in-law of Chester Ashley, and received therefor 77 one pound bars of lead. This slab bore distinct signs on its faces of having been struck with an axe or tomahawk. It had a hole in each corner about 1 by ½ inch, just about the size that would be necessary for a strap to pass through in order to pack it. It was found in a vein of black clay and a little removed from it, on one side, was a bed of ashes and fire-coals, in same vein of clay, plainly indicating that this was over the surface of the ground and that the accumulation of ages had thus covered it with 18 feet (5.5 m) of soil. Here again is ample room for speculation and conjecture. Was this the remains of a camp-fire? Was this slab of lead cast here at this time? If so, by whom, for what purpose, and why was it abandoned? From my studies in connection with these discoveries, I am convinced that there certainly was, at sometime, an important Fort at this place, garrisoned by somebody; that said Fort was attacked by invaders; that it was subsequently demolished either before or after capitulation; and that history fails to record any information thereof.

It is a matter of history that "De-Soto" Hernando de Soto (explorer), passed through this identical country in his search for the "Golden land". Crossing the Arkansas river near or at Pine Bluff, he continued his explorations up to near the head-waters of the Arkansas, and returning passed over nearly the same route; that he had many desperate fights with the Indians; that he, on this exploration established three Forts, and that historians have so far failed to locate the 3rd Fort. May not this be the lost Fort of De-Sota? I think so, can any proof be brought to the contrary.

Courtesy of and transcribed June 2000 by B. Collins, great-great-granddaughter of R.W. Benedict. The family of Mr. Benedict still have the original manuscript, written in the 1800s, in their possession.

The ancient fort has not been located and it is now believed that the fort was likely built by French explorer Jean-Baptiste Bénard de la Harpe, who is credited with naming the stone outcropping on the Arkansas River that is the namesake of the city of Little Rock.

== Flood of 1927 ==
This picture was taken of the Great Mississippi Flood of 1927 in Natural Steps. It shows Natural Steps knee-deep in river water from this point, all the way to Pinnacle Mountain. Seen in the background are the Natural Steps train depot, the Moreland commissary and Pinnacle Mountain.

== Homes ==
=== Mainard House ===
Built around 1870, the Mainard House was one of the first homes built in Natural Steps. "It is a tall house that faces the river and until the flood of 1927 the river ran much closer to the house. There used to be a gin on the place and boats pulled up there to load and unload cotton." The home is not open to the public.

=== Moreland House ===
The first Moreland home was built in the 1870s and was nothing more than a shack. It was later converted into a barn and garage once the new home was built. Built in the early 1920s by Dr. L. B. Moreland, "The Brick House" became the second Moreland home. The two-story home had five bedrooms, one bath, living and dining, with a very large basement. One of the rooms was converted into an office for Dr. Moreland to see patients. Later, an extra bathroom was added on.

Dr. Moreland, who loved orchards, had the home surrounded by peach and apple orchards. During the Great Mississippi Flood of 1927, the basement of the home was filled with water from the Arkansas River and the only way to get access to the home was by boat. The picture below was taken from the house. The house did not survive a fire in the late 1970s.

Flood of 1927

Mainard House

Moreland Home 1800s

Moreland Home, before 1970

== Train depot ==
At one time, Natural Steps had a small train depot off Maple Ave. The Memphis and Choctaw Railroad was built along the southern edge of town in 1898, with a small station building beside the tracks. Railroad ties, oak, and cypress lumber, and wooden shingles were shipped out on the railroad starting in 1907, from depots at the towns of Pinnacle and Natural Steps. Several smaller sawmills called "gopher mills" operated in the area, and the timber industry, along with farming, provided the first major source of income for early residents. The old depot was destroyed in the early 1900s.

== Cotton farm ==
Moreland Cotton Gin

One of the oldest running farms in Natural Steps is Moreland Farms. The family has been farming in the Natural Steps area since the 1870s. Cotton was the main cash crop when they first started their farming operation and as time went on they moved into soybeans. At one point the farm had a cotton gin, a blacksmith shop, a sawmill and a commissary along the Rock Island Railroad, but these were torn down in 1963. The commissary was destroyed in the early 1900s. The Moreland family still farms in the area today.

The commissary was also used as the first post office for the area. The post office was established on September 6, 1880, with Dr. Duval as postmaster. However, the post office lasted only thirteen months, closing on October 3, 1881. A second post office was established on March 15, 1901, with Henry P. Clay as postmaster, succeeded in 1902 by Little Bart Moreland, in 1910 by Walter A. Nowlin, and in 1913 by Little Bart Moreland. The post office was discontinued on August 31, 1925, with Little Bart Moreland the last postmaster.

== Churches ==
The Natural Steps Baptist Church was established in 1913 and built beside the Natural Steps Cemetery. The original church burned down in 1962 and was rebuilt along AR 300, where it still stands today. The Natural Steps Methodist Church was written about by the Arkansas Gazette on November 12, 1936:

The village of Natural Steps is on the Rock Island Railroad on a bluff overlooking the Arkansas River, about 18 miles northwest of Little Rock. It received its name from natural rock steps leading from the bluff down to the river. The river bottom lands are very fertile, but mostly cultivated by colored people so that the white population of this community is very small. It is not known just when the first Methodist church was organized at Natural Steps. The records show that in December, 1884, a deed was given to the property where the present church is now located. The property was given jointly by Mr. and Mrs. R.C. Newson and Dr. and Mrs. T. M. Duvall, citizens of this community at that time. Soon after the deed was executed a church was built and used, both, as a Methodist church and a school house. After about ten years the church was burned, supposedly, by some one who had fallen out with the school teacher. Soon after this the present church was built under the pastorate of Rev. J.F. Taylor who has given a large part of his long ministry to the mountain territory lying between Little Rock and Hot Springs and who is at present serving two churches out in this territory that were left off the regular appointments. This church was originally called Shady Grove.

The old Methodist Church burned to the ground in the late 1940s during a volunteer clean-up day at the Natural Steps Cemetery. A spark from one of the fires landed on the roof of the church and by the time the locals realized, it was too late.

== Cemeteries ==
- Natural Steps Cemetery, established September 1, 1861
- Bailor Cemetery, African American Cemetery

== Education ==
Beginning in the late 1884, Natural Steps built the Natural Steps Methodist Church that was originally known as Shady Grove Church. It occupied a one-room church and school house. The school closed in the late 1920s. That building burned ten years after it was built and was replaced with another. This building burned in the 1940s.

Natural Steps is in the Pulaski County Special School District, and is zoned to Joe T. Robinson Elementary School, Joe T. Robinson Middle School, and Joe T. Robinson High School.

== Historic bridge ==
In the 1920s, a one-lane truss bridge was built on the route of the old AR 300 to cross the Little Maumelle River. It is listed on the Historic Bridges of the United States (Maumelle River AR 300 Bridge) for Pulaski County, Arkansas. The bridge still stands in the shadow of Pinnacle Mountain, but was made obsolete by a new bridge built in 1981. Today, it is only open to pedestrians for fishing and is part of the 223-mile-long Ouachita National Recreation Trail.

== State park ==
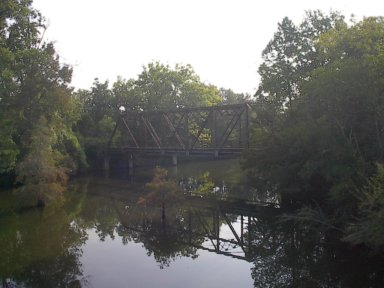
Bridge near Natural Steps

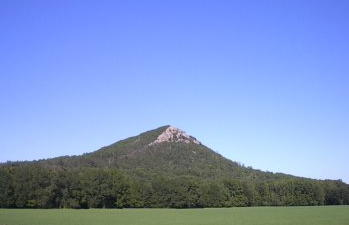
Pinnacle Mountain

Pinnacle Mountain State Park was established as a state park in 1973. "The Fulk family, who owned the largest tract, including Pinnacle Mountain, also supported the plan to establish it as a state park." It is located just south of Natural Steps on Arkansas Highway 300 and is popular with climbers, hikers, and picnickers. "The primary natural feature of the 2,000-acre (8.1 km^{2}) park is Pinnacle Mountain, elevation 1,011 feet (308 m), which rises steeply above the Arkansas River Valley, at an elevation of 300 feet (91 m)." The mountain is in the northeast corner of the Ouachita Mountains.

The cone-shaped peak was first mentioned in the book, A Journal of Travels into the Arkansas Territory During the Year 1819, written by naturalist Thomas Nuttall. During the colonial and early American periods, the mountain was known as "Mamelle" mountain. "Mamelle" is a name commonly applied in the French-speaking parts of the world to a breast or any breast-shaped hill. Over time, the term "Mamelle" became "Maumelle," which is a name now applied to the Big Maumelle and Little Maumelle rivers, Lake Maumelle, and two different communities in the area.

Beginning in 1822, the local "Natural Steps" provided a convenient stop for Little Rock visitors to disembark for their hike to the mountain. Visitation increased with the construction of the local railroad in the 1890s. With common use of the automobile and improved roads in the early 20th century, climbing the pinnacle became even more popular and accessible.

The park provides environmental protection and conservation for a relatively unspoiled tract of hills, forests, and waterways near a growing metropolitan area. It also provides recreational and educational facilities and programs for visitors. The park's diverse habitats range from high upland rocky peaks, upland forests, and wetlands and bottomlands along the Big and Little Maumelle rivers. The various habitats provide many outdoor recreational and educational opportunities. Included in these are canoe and boat tours led by park interpreters. Also available are educational tours, self-guided trails, wayside outdoor exhibits, four major vistas, and opportunities for natural solitude.

Pinnacle Mountain is a day-use-only park with an emphasis on preservation rather than development. Gates at Pinnacle Mountain State Park close one hour after sunset. Park facilities include picnic sites, two standard pavilions, two launch ramps, eight hiking trails, and two overlooks. The park visitor center overlooking the Arkansas River includes exhibits, A/V programs, a meeting room, and gift shop.

The eight hiking trails range from the easy one-half-mile paved Kingfisher trail to the two-mile Rocky Valley trail. The Ouachita National Recreation Trail begins at the visitor center and proceeds 223 miles through the Ouachita Mountains, ending at Talimena State Park in southeastern Oklahoma. The first three miles are within the park.

== Masonic Stone ==
1976 Masonic Marker

The most spectacular gathering at the steps occurred June 28, 1876, when the combined memberships of the Western Star Lodge, Magnolia Lodge, and Mary Williams Lodge came by steamboat and held a joint installation. A century later, June 27, 1976, the same lodges came by boat and car for a similar ceremony, followed by burial of a time capsule that was to be opened one hundred years hence. The site is marked by a granite monument bearing the names of worshipful masters of the three lodges.

== Legend ==
In the 1940s, residents of Natural Steps began dynamiting the steps in search of Confederate gold lying beneath the massive stones. A local legend purports that a Confederate gunboat was sunk near the Natural Steps so that the Union Army, which had just captured Little Rock, could not take possession of the gold on board. The thinking was that the steps would be a marker for where the gold laid and the Confederates could come back later and reclaim it. Three Confederate soldiers died in the explosion that sank the gunboat and are buried in the Natural Steps Cemetery. In the late 19th century, one of the locals, waiting to catch a steamboat at the foot of the steps, found a $5 gold piece. No gold was ever found in the 1940s and the steps were partially destroyed by the dynamite.

Another legend was given to us by Bart Moreland Sr., who was born in Natural Steps. "The old story goes that Jesse James and his gang spent the night, in Natural Steps, and robbed a stage coach in Benton, on the road to Hot Springs, the next day." Bart Sr. then said, "Yeah, that was the talk, then, I was born 1899, and it was the 1800s that Jesse James spent the night there." When asked who told him, "Oh, several, my dad and mother for one, or two." The old cabin that Jesse James was said to have stayed in no longer exists. Written in the Pinnacle Mountain Community Post.

=== The Natural Steps Ghost ===
On the darkest of nights in late October, a woman in white can be seen walking in the Natural Steps Cemetery. She is first seen in the northeast section of the cemetery where the old Natural Steps Baptist Church sat before it burned. From there, she is seen heading north into the woods towards the Natural Steps. Once she arrives at the steps, she follows the rock steps down into the Arkansas River and is never seen again.

The legend is that the woman in white is Martha Sanders, a young bride who lost her husband, Gustavus Sanders, days after their wedding. Gustavus Sanders died in October 1880 from an unknown disease that took many lives in the small community. But before his death, Gustavus and Martha decided to wed at their favorite meeting spot, at the top of the Natural Steps, overlooking the Arkansas River. Unfortunately, the honeymoon was short for the young couple because just days later he was dead and was laid to rest behind the old wooden church. The grief was too great for Martha and after his funeral she just disappeared, never seen again by family or friends. It is believed that she is the woman in white and that she took her life by jumping into the Arkansas River from the Natural Steps.

The woman in white has been seen by a few in the community. The older generations still tell their stories of Gustavus and Martha Sanders.

== Gallery ==
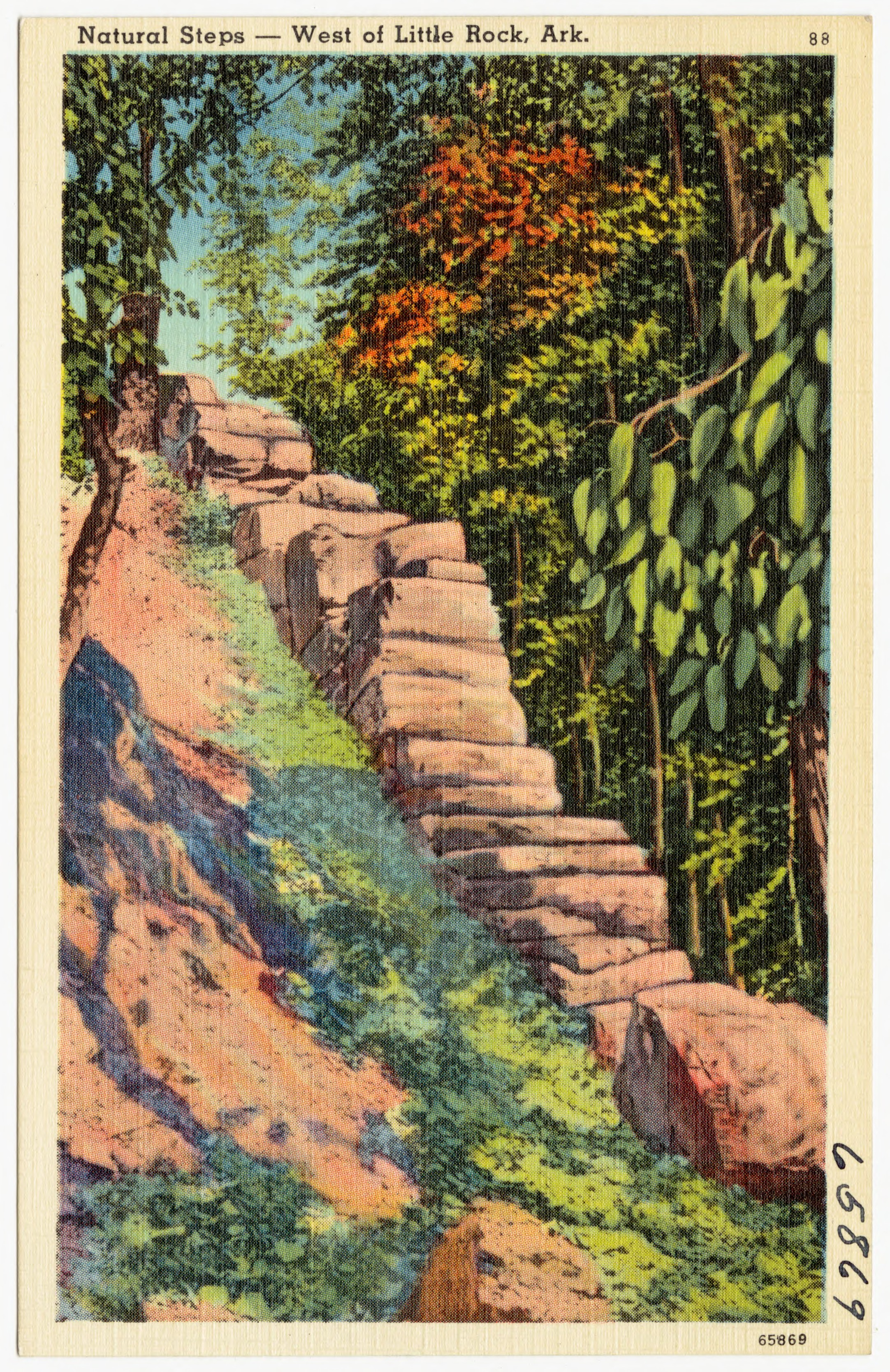
Postcard

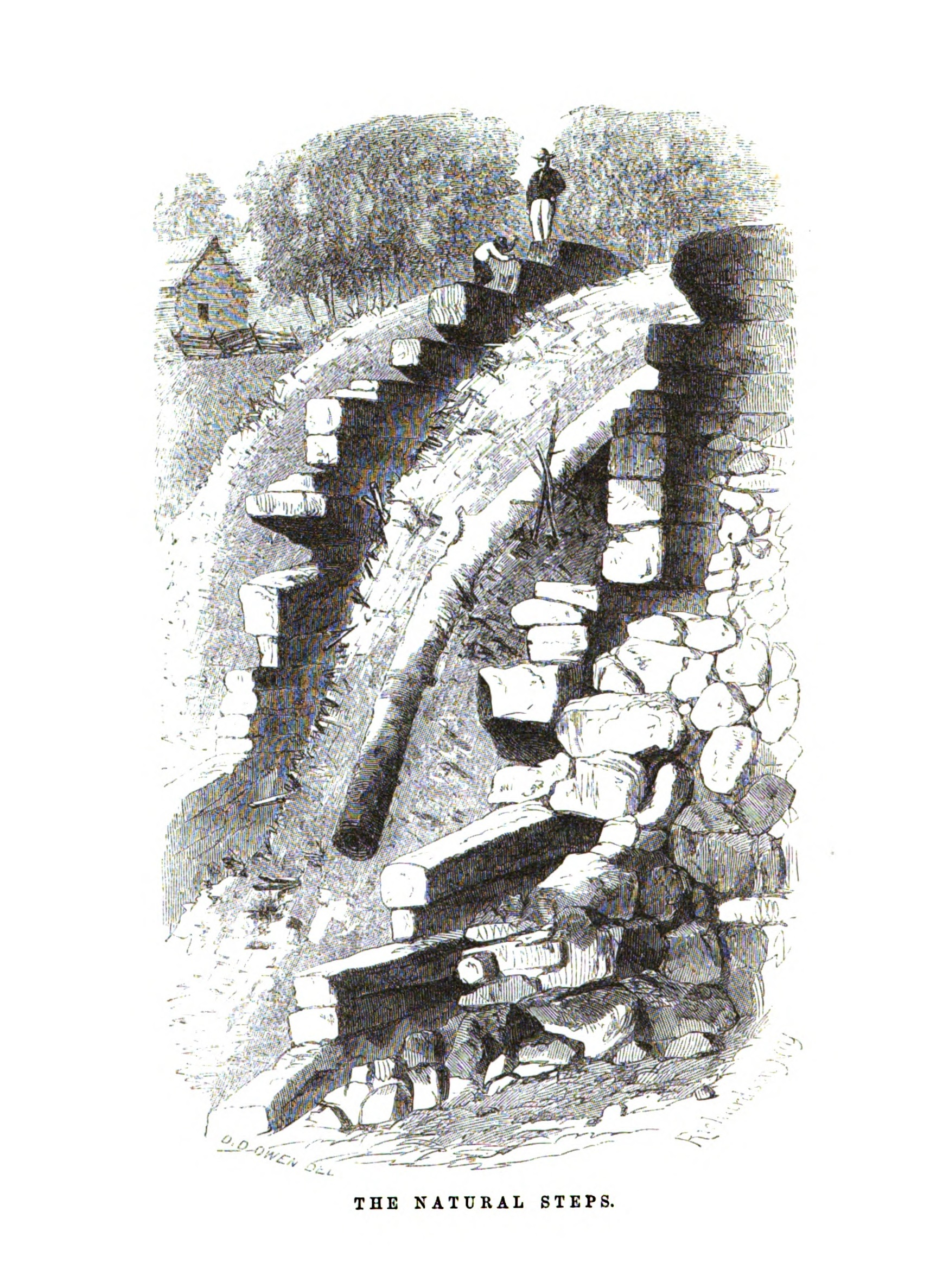
Illustration by David Dale Owen

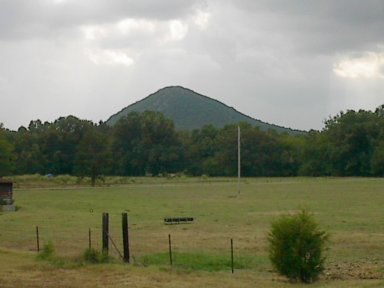
Pinnacle Mountain from the Natural Steps

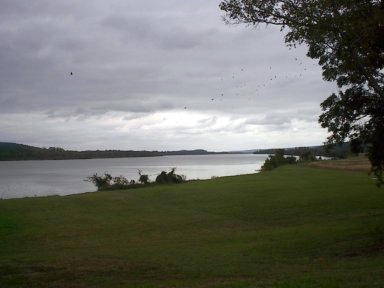
Arkansas River
