= Camp Clearfork =

- Camp Clearfork Historic District
- U.S. National Register of Historic Places
- U.S. Historic district
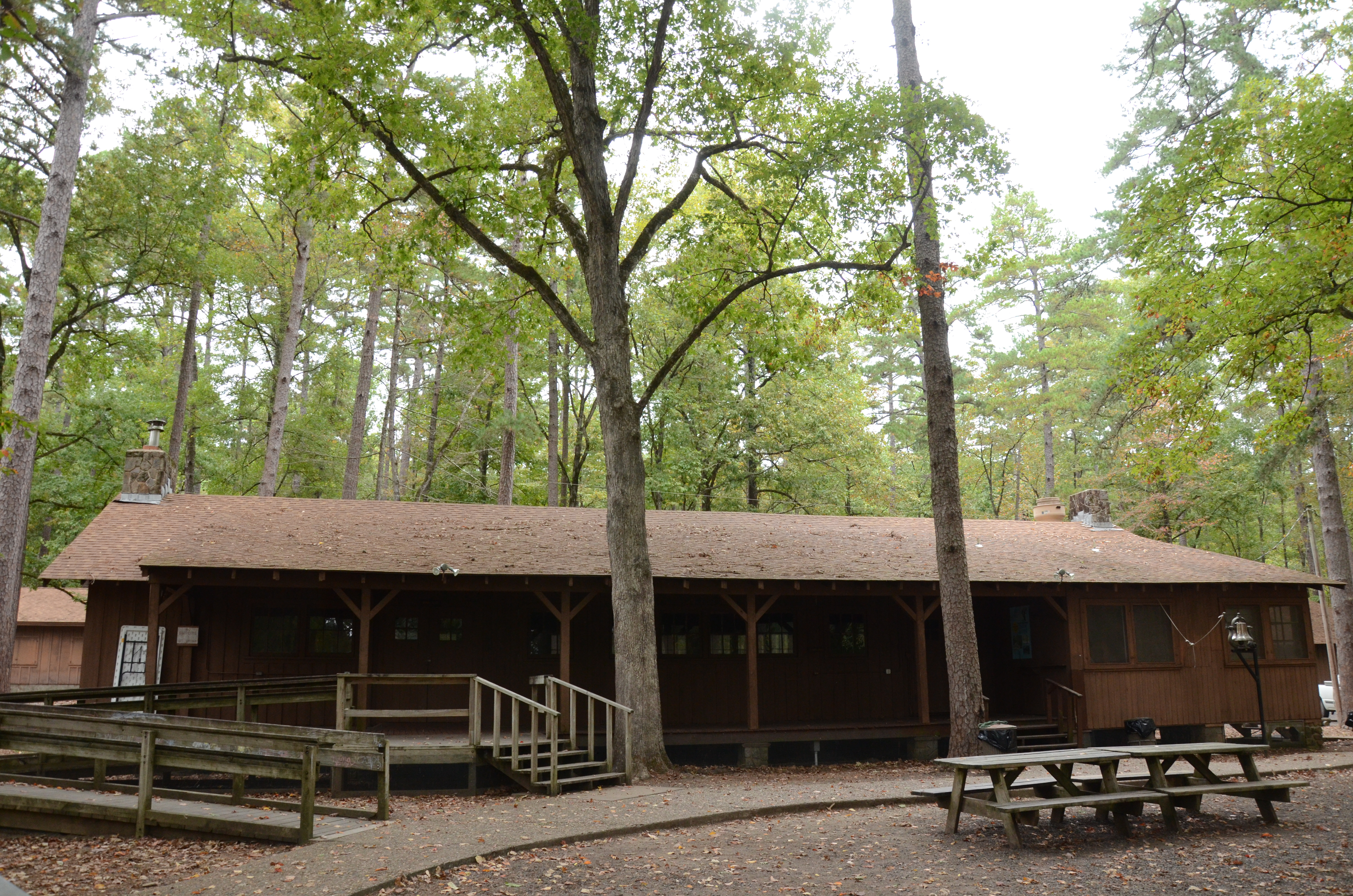

- Location within Arkansas Location within the United States
- Nearest city: Crystal Springs, Arkansas
- Coordinates: 34°30′30″N 93°23′32″W
- Area: 21 acres (8.5 ha)
- Built: 1935
- Built by: Civilian Conservation Corps
- Architectural style: Rustic
- MPS: Facilities Constructed by the CCC in Arkansas MPS
- NRHP reference No.: 93001079
- Added to NRHP: October 21, 1993

Camp Clearfork is a group use recreational facility in Ouachita National Forest, west of the city of Hot Springs, Arkansas. It is located at the end of Camp Clearfork Trail, south of United States Route 270. The camp was developed in the 1930s by the Civilian Conservation Corps (CCC), and includes cabins, a recreation hall, and Camp Clearfork Reservoir, impounded by a CCC-built dam.

The camp was listed on the National Register of Historic Places in 1993.

== See also ==
- National Register of Historic Places listings in Garland County, Arkansas
