= Sugarloaf Mountains-Midland Peak Natural Area =

Protected area in Arkansas, United States

Coordinates: 35°03′56″N 94°22′44″W

The Sugarloaf Mountains-Midland Peak Natural Area is an upland area of connected mountain ridges in the Arkansas Valley adjacent to the Arkansas–Oklahoma border and south of Fort Smith, Arkansas. This Natural Area is one part of a mosaic of high forest, savanna, and glade in the transition zone between the temperate broadleaf and mixed forests of the Eastern United States and the tallgrass prairie of the southern Great Plains. Sugarloaf Mountain (officially, East Midland Peak) has the largest identified population of the endangered maple-leaf oak as well as populations of the endangered Ouachita Mountain leadplant, Elymus churchii (Church's wild rye), and long-bract spiderwort.

The Sugarloaf Mountains-Midland Peak Natural Area consists of about 1,200 acres (490 ha) of environmentally–sensitive land purchased in 2022 for purposes of environmental protection by the Arkansas Natural Heritage Commission.

In addition to its role as a protected area for endangered species, this Natural Area is available for recreation, hunting, and fishing.
