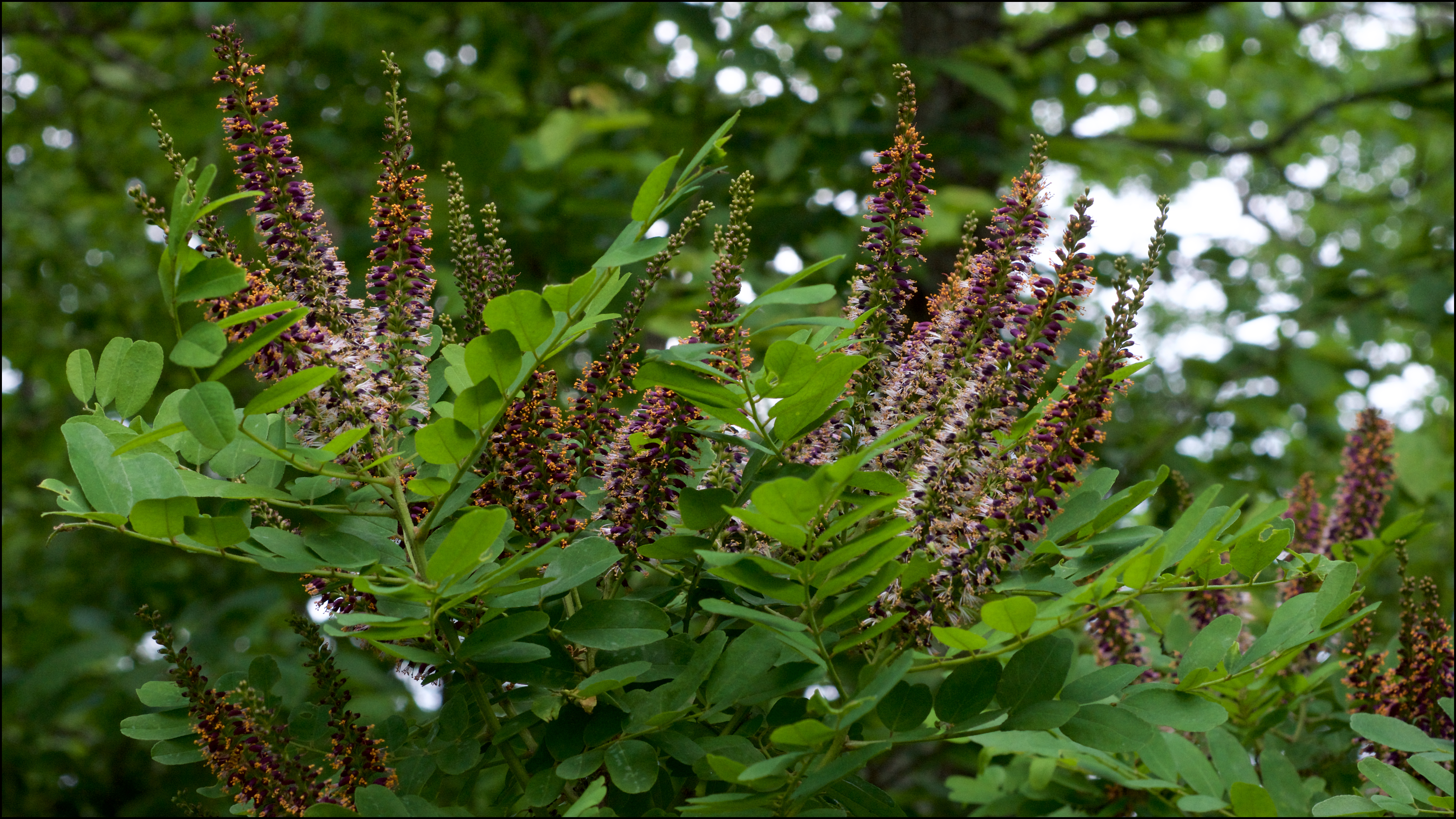

Conservation status
- Vulnerable (IUCN 3.1)

Scientific classification
- Kingdom: Plantae
- Clade: Tracheophytes
- Clade: Angiosperms
- Clade: Eudicots
- Clade: Rosids
- Order: Fabales
- Family: Fabaceae
- Subfamily: Faboideae
- Genus: Amorpha
- Species: A. ouachitensis

Binomial name
- Amorpha ouachitensis Wilbur 1975

= Amorpha ouachitensis =

Species of legume

Amorpha ouachitensis is an uncommon North American species of flowering plant in the legume family known by the common names Ouachita leadplant, Ouachita Mountain leadplant, Ouachita false indigo, and Ouachita indigobush. It is native to Oklahoma and Arkansas in the United States.

Amorpha ouachitensis is a shrub growing up to about 2 meters (80 inches) tall. The compound leaves are each made up of several oval leaflets. The inflorescence is made up of many flowers with purple petals and yellow anthers.

Amorpha ouachitensis is native to the Ouachita Mountains. In Oklahoma it occurs in Le Flore, McCurtain, and Pushmataha Counties. In Arkansas the plant occurs in Conway, Garland, Logan, Montgomery, and Polk Counties. The species manifests in the Sugarloaf Mountains-Midland Peak Natural Area.

Amorpha ouachitensis grows in clearings and on rocky slopes, often next to streams or on floodplains. It is associated with other plants that include Calamovilfa arcuata, Streptanthus squamiformis, and Gaura demareei.

The species is threatened by alteration of its habitat.
