= Flatside Wilderness =

Protected area in Arkansas, US

- IUCN category Ib (wilderness area)
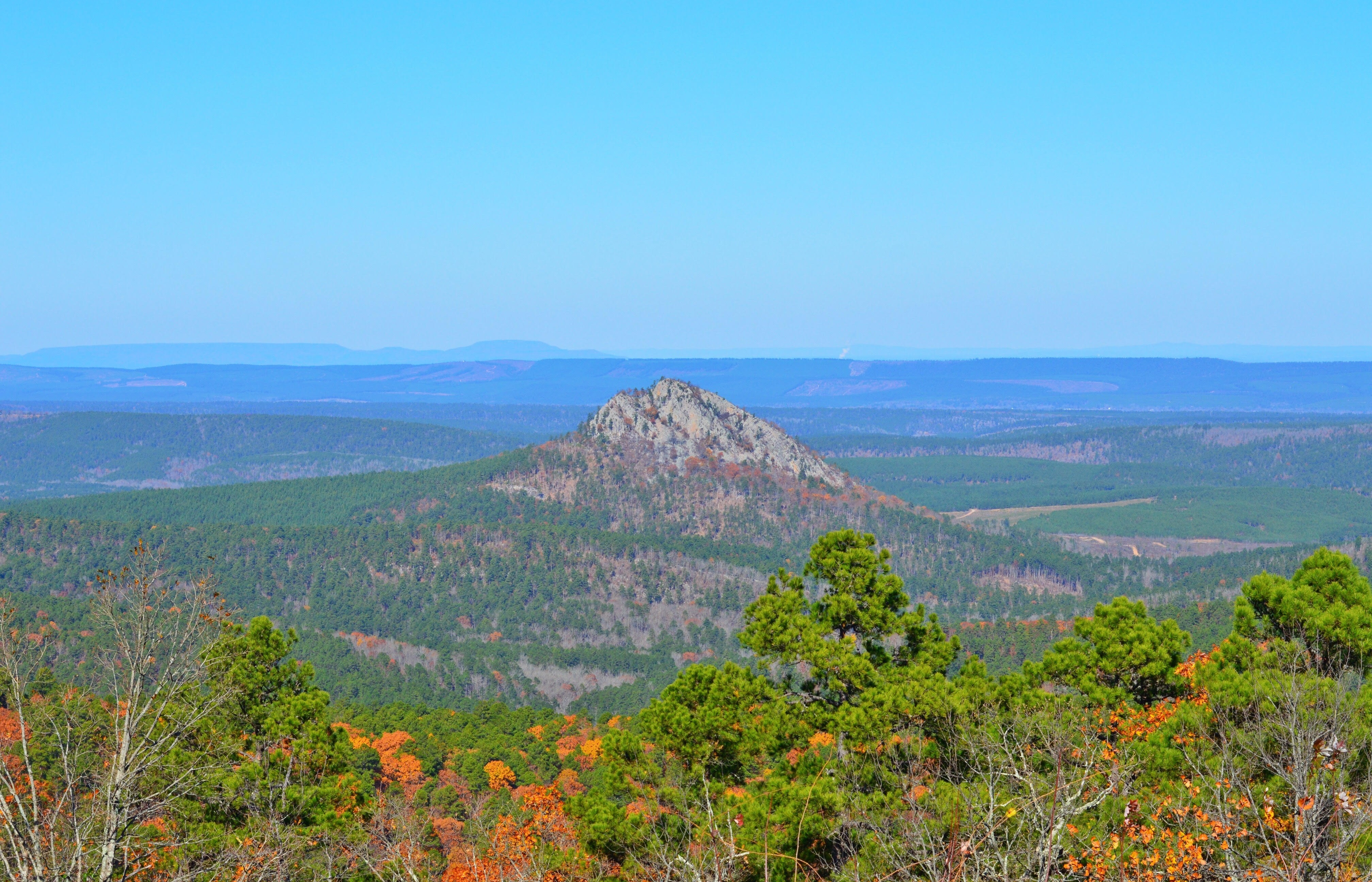
- Forked Mountain as seen from White Oak Mountain

- Location within Arkansas Location within the United States
- Location: Perry County, Arkansas
- Nearest city: Perryville, Arkansas
- Coordinates: 34°51′35″N 92°56′51″W
- Area: 9,507 acres (3,847 ha)
- Created: October 19, 1984
- Governing body: U.S. Forest Service

The Flatside Wilderness is a 9,507-acre protected area in the U.S. state of Arkansas. It is one of six wilderness areas in the Ouachita National Forest and also the easternmost. Outdoor enthusiasts can enjoy the area in a number of ways, including an 8.9-mile section of the Ouachita National Recreation Trail.

== History ==
The Flatside Wilderness was designated by passage of "The Arkansas Wilderness Act of 1984", Public Law 98-508, which was signed by President Ronald Reagan on October 19, 1984. Senator Dale Bumpers (D-AR) sponsored the Act in the U.S. Senate, which was co-sponsored by Senator David Pryor (D-AR) and Senator John Tower (R-TX). An earlier version of the bill called "The Arkansas Wilderness Act of 1983" had been sponsored in the House of Representatives by Representative Beryl Anthony (D-AR) and Representative Ed Bethune (R-AR). On September 8, 2019, a bill sponsored by Congressman French Hill was signed into law which expanded the wilderness area by 640 acres. The area was named the Bethune Woods segment, in honor of the politician who helped create the original wilderness in the first place. The bill also directed the US Forest Service to study additional woodlands surrounding the wilderness in the hopes that they are eligible to add to the area.

The wilderness' namesake, Flatside Pinnacle, lies just outside of the area and is known as one of the best vistas in Arkansas.

== Geography ==
Flatside Wilderness is located in southern Perry County and northwestern Saline County, though most of it (about 70%) is in Saline County. It is approximately 8 miles north of Hot Springs Village and 21 miles west of Little Rock, and is accessible from Arkansas Highway 7 and Arkansas Highway 9.

It is located in the eastern terminus of the Ouachita National Forest, which covers approximately 1.8 million acres of western Arkansas and southeastern Oklahoma. It is part of the Ouachita Mountains and features a number of ridges and summits exceeding 1,000 feet in elevation. The highest is White Oak Mountain (1,790 feet), a broad ridge spanning the western edge of the area. Others include (in order of descending height): Crystal Mountain, Grindstone Mountain, Flatside Pinnacle, and Forked Mountain. These rise high above the forest and offer spectacular vistas for miles. Mount Magazine, the highest point in Arkansas, can even be seen on clear days.

Flatside Wilderness is home to multiple streams. The two most notable ones are Cedar Creek and Crystal Prong. Cedar Creek is joined by Little Cedar Creek and flows along the eastern edge of Forked Mountain just before its confluence with the South Fourche La Fave River. Crystal Prong flows generally east to west and merges with Cedar Creek near Forked Mountain. The South Fourche La Fave River empties into the Fourche La Fave River east of Nimrod, which empties into the Arkansas River southeast of Bigelow.

== Geology ==
The Flatside Wilderness consists of two geologic formations: Pennsylvanian Jackfork Sandstone and Mississippian Stanley Shale. Because Jackfork Sandstone is composed almost entirely of quartz and has undergone low-grade regional metamorphism, it has weathered at a lesser rate than the Stanley Shale, hence the high-relief sandstone ridges like White Oak Mountain.

== See also ==
- List of U.S. Wilderness Areas
