= Texas International Airlines Flight 655 =

1973 plane crash in Arkansas, United States

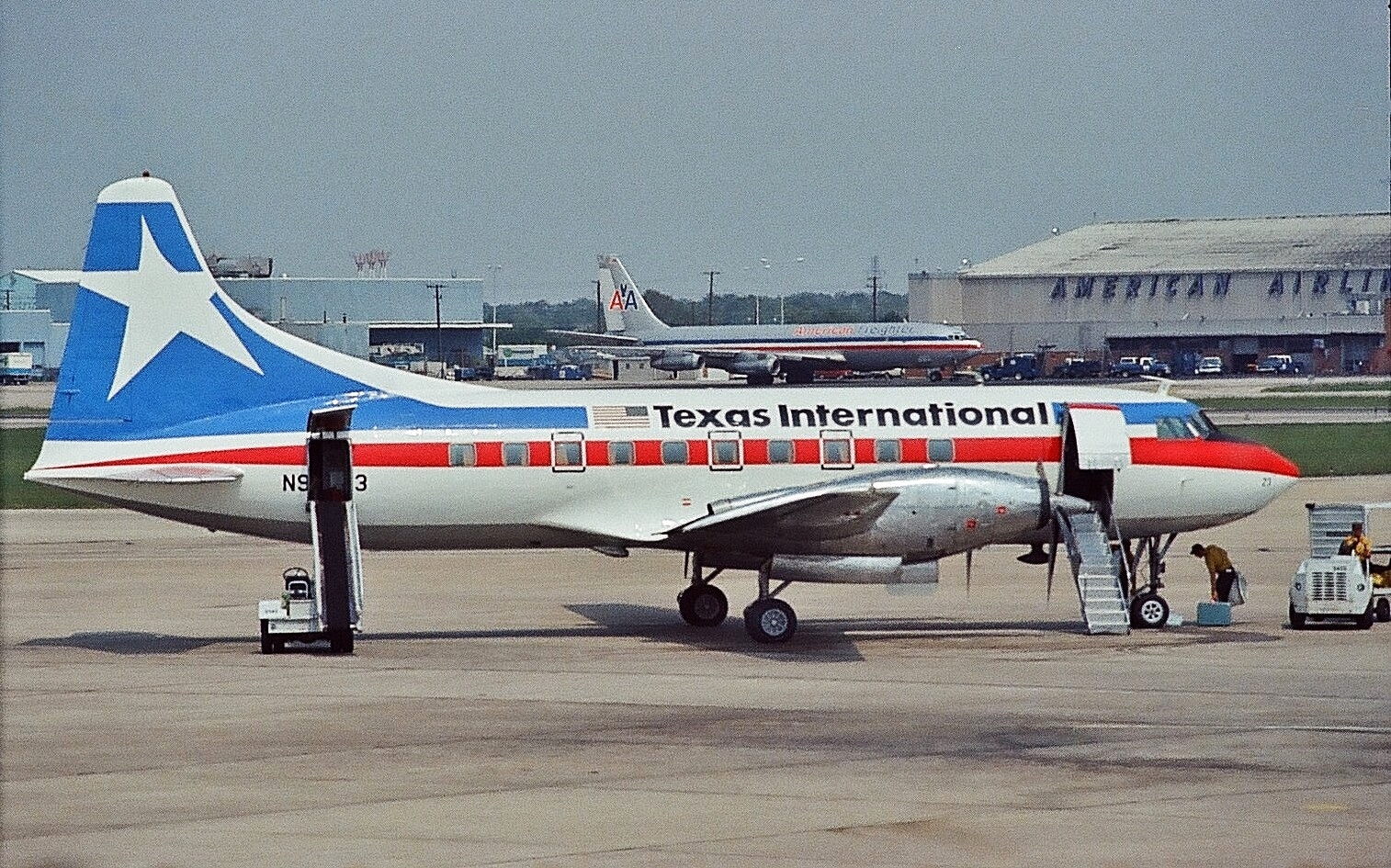
- A Convair CV-600 similar to the accident aircraft

Accident
- Date: September 27, 1973
- Summary: Controlled flight into terrain due to pilot error in inclement weather
- Site: Black Fork Mountain, Arkansas, United States; 34°42′05″N 94°20′00″W

Aircraft
- Aircraft type: Convair 600
- Operator: Texas International Airlines
- Registration: N94230
- Flight origin: Memphis International Airport, Tennessee, United States
- 1st stopover: Grider Field, Arkansas, United States
- 2nd stopover: Goodwin Field, Arkansas, United States
- Last stopover: Texarkana Municipal Airport, Arkansas, United States
- Destination: Dallas Love Field, Texas, United States
- Occupants: 11
- Passengers: 8
- Crew: 3
- Fatalities: 11
- Survivors: 0

Texas International Airlines Flight 655 was a scheduled domestic flight within the United States of America. On September 27, 1973, the Convair 600 turboprop aircraft en route from El Dorado to Texarkana, Arkansas crashed into Black Fork Mountain, Arkansas. The eight passengers and three crew members on board were killed.

== Background ==
=== Aircraft ===
The aircraft involved in this accident was a 25 year old Convair 600 registered as N94230. It featured the manufacturing number 56 and had 51,208 total flight hours. The engines were two Rolls-Royce Dart 542-4 turboprop engines.

=== Crew ===
The captain was 41 year old Ralph Crosman. A highly experienced pilot, he had 11,800 flight hours, with 6,000 being on the type. First Officer William Tumlinson was 37, and was also pretty experienced, with 7,106 flight hours, 4,500 of which were on the type.

== Accident ==
The route from El Dorado to Texarkana was part of a longer sequence starting in Memphis, Tennessee, with stops in Pine Bluff, El Dorado, and Texarkana in Arkansas; and finally terminating in Dallas, Texas. While the plane was on the ground in El Dorado, the crew consulted with Flight Service Station staff and another set of pilots about a line of thunderstorms 35 nautical miles (40 mi; 65 km) to the west. Upon confirming there was a 15 nautical miles (17 mi; 28 km) wide break in the storm the crew departed at night under visual flight rules (VFR).

After departing El Dorado, no contact was made with any controllers en route. When the plane was overdue at Texarkana, search and rescue was notified. Despite an extensive search along the proposed route of flight, no sign of the aircraft was found. A controller at the Fort Worth air traffic control center advised the searchers that he had observed an unidentified VFR target departing from El Dorado to the northwest before the plane went missing. With this information, the wreckage was found after three days of searching. There were no survivors.

The cockpit voice recorder later revealed the first officer was flying the plane while the captain advised him of headings and altitudes to take to navigate around the storm. The captain then deviated the aircraft around 100 nautical miles (120 mi; 190 km) to the north in an attempt to go around it. The first officer expressed concern that he did not know their position and what the terrain clearance was for the area. After the captain ordered him to descend to 2,000 feet (610 m) the first officer consulted an en-route instrument chart. He alerted the captain they were too low saying, "Minimum en route altitude here is forty-four hun ..." The recording cut off during this sentence as the plane struck Black Fork Mountain.

== Investigation ==
The National Transportation Safety Board investigation concluded that the crew did not discuss the details of their intended route with Flight Service or activate the instrument flight rules (IFR) flight plan forwarded from the airline dispatch to Flight Service. If they had been operating under instrument flight rules they would have been tracked by radar or required to make position reports to air traffic control en route. Under VFR they would only need to maintain contact with a controller while in controlled airspace. In this area of rural Arkansas there was no controlled airspace below 18,000 feet (5,500 m). Further, according to Federal Aviation Regulations the airline dispatcher should have been notified the flight was proceeding under VFR. The captain also could have contacted controllers in Fort Worth to open their flight plan or receive radar vectoring in the area.

From the conversation of the crew on the recorder the board concluded the flight encountered inclement weather conditions during the flight and was likely in inclement weather conditions when it crashed. The board concluded that the cause of the accident was the captain's decision to continue flying into inclement weather at night, his not taking advantage of the nearby navigational aids to get a fix on their position, and his decision to descend despite the first officer's concerns about position and terrain.

== Aftermath ==
In the coming years, FAA regulations pertaining to commercial flights would require that all airliners operate only on instrument flight plans when passengers are carried. This rule has undoubtedly contributed much to the safety of airline travel, as flights under those rules specify altitudes and routes that must be followed and that have been predetermined to provide terrain clearance.
