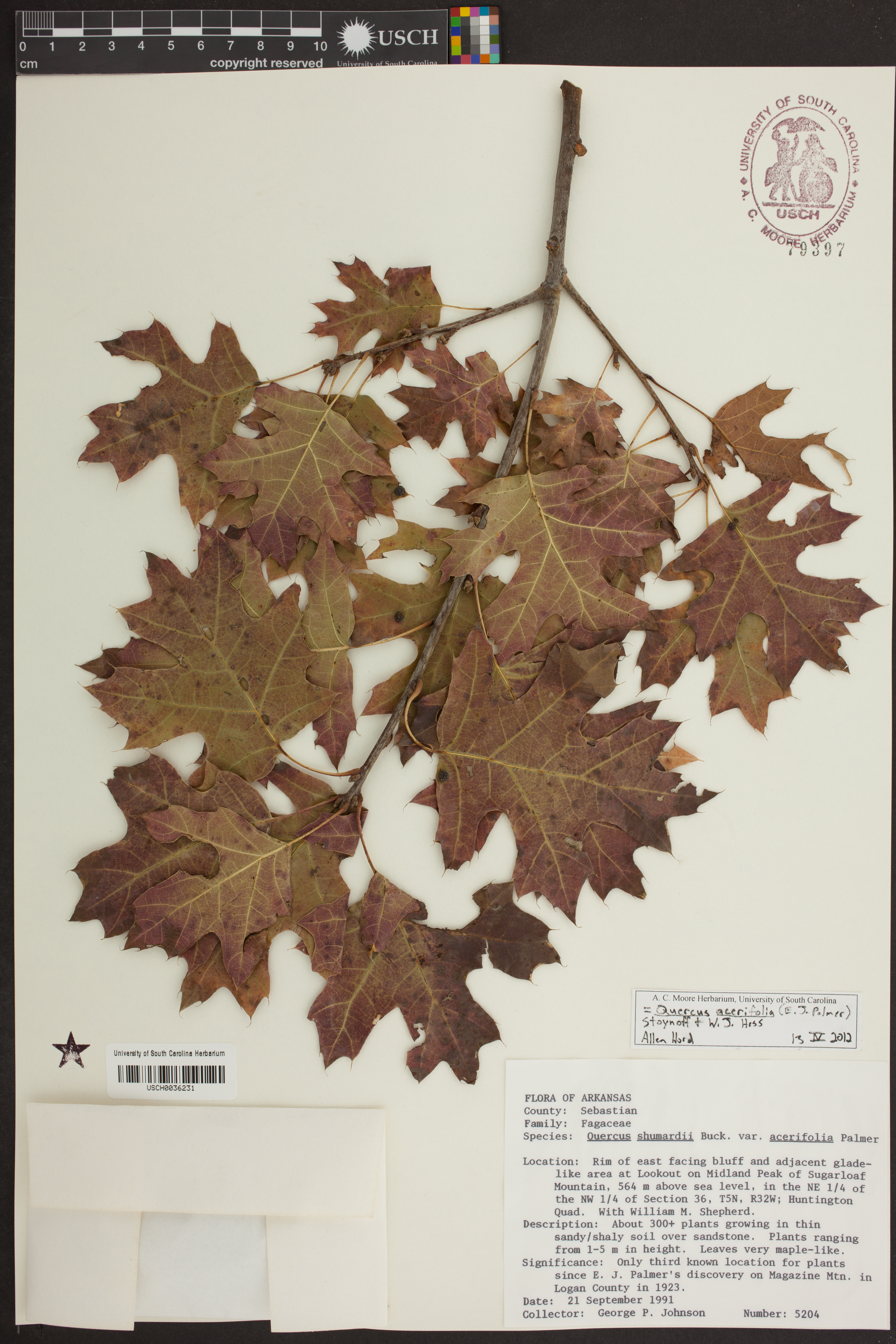

Conservation status
- Endangered (IUCN 3.1)

Scientific classification
- Kingdom: Plantae
- Clade: Tracheophytes
- Clade: Angiosperms
- Clade: Eudicots
- Clade: Rosids
- Order: Fagales
- Family: Fagaceae
- Genus: Quercus
- Subgenus: Quercus subg. Quercus
- Section: Quercus sect. Lobatae
- Species: Q. acerifolia

Binomial name
- Quercus acerifolia (Palmer) Stoynoff & Hess

Synonyms
- Quercus shumardii var. acerifolia E.J. Palmer

= Quercus acerifolia =

Species of oak tree

Quercus acerifolia (also called maple-leaf oak) is a rare North American species of oak in the red oak section of Quercus (known as Lobatae). The species was first described in 1927 from samples collected by E.J. Palmer in the Ozark Mountains. The initial documentation classified the species as Quercus shumardii var. acerifolia. The species was first perceived as a variant of Shumard oak due to its similar foliage and ranges. Over two decades later, the tree was re-evaluated by botanists Nick Alan Stoynoff and William J. Hess, who determined that it was a distinct species. Their case for reclassification was presented in the paper, "A New Status for Quercus shumardii var. acerifolia (Fagaceae)," published in the journal Sida in 1990. The reclassification was based on the tree's unique ecological and morphological characteristics including leaf shape, acorn size, and ecological niche. The species was renamed Quercus acerifolia, due to its leaf shape which resembles that of a maple tree.

== Description ==
=== Foliage ===
Maple-leaf oak is often mistaken as a variant of other oak species due to its similar leaf shape and general appearance, but its subtle morphological and genetic traits distinguish it from other oaks. The venation of the leaves shows them to be technically pinnately five-lobed but with the two middle lobes larger than the other three. This makes the leaves appear palmately lobed at first glance, similar to those of the Norway maple tree (Acer platanoides). The leaves are broader and shorter than the typical Q. shumardii leaves. The epithet acerifolia means "maple-leaved." This medium-sized deciduous tree has distinctive fall coloration, with its leaves transitioning from green to vibrant shades of red.

=== Growth patterns ===
The tree sometimes reaches a height of 15 meters (50 feet). This species appears in both stemmed shrub and single trunk tree versions. Maple-leaf oak produces insignificant yellowish-green flowers in spring with emerging foliage. This species of oak also produces acorns which are typically no more than seventeen mm long, about 1/3 smaller than Q. shumardii acorns. The tree bark is smoother when the tree is young, but pronounced dark ridging occurs as the tree ages.

== Habitat and distribution ==
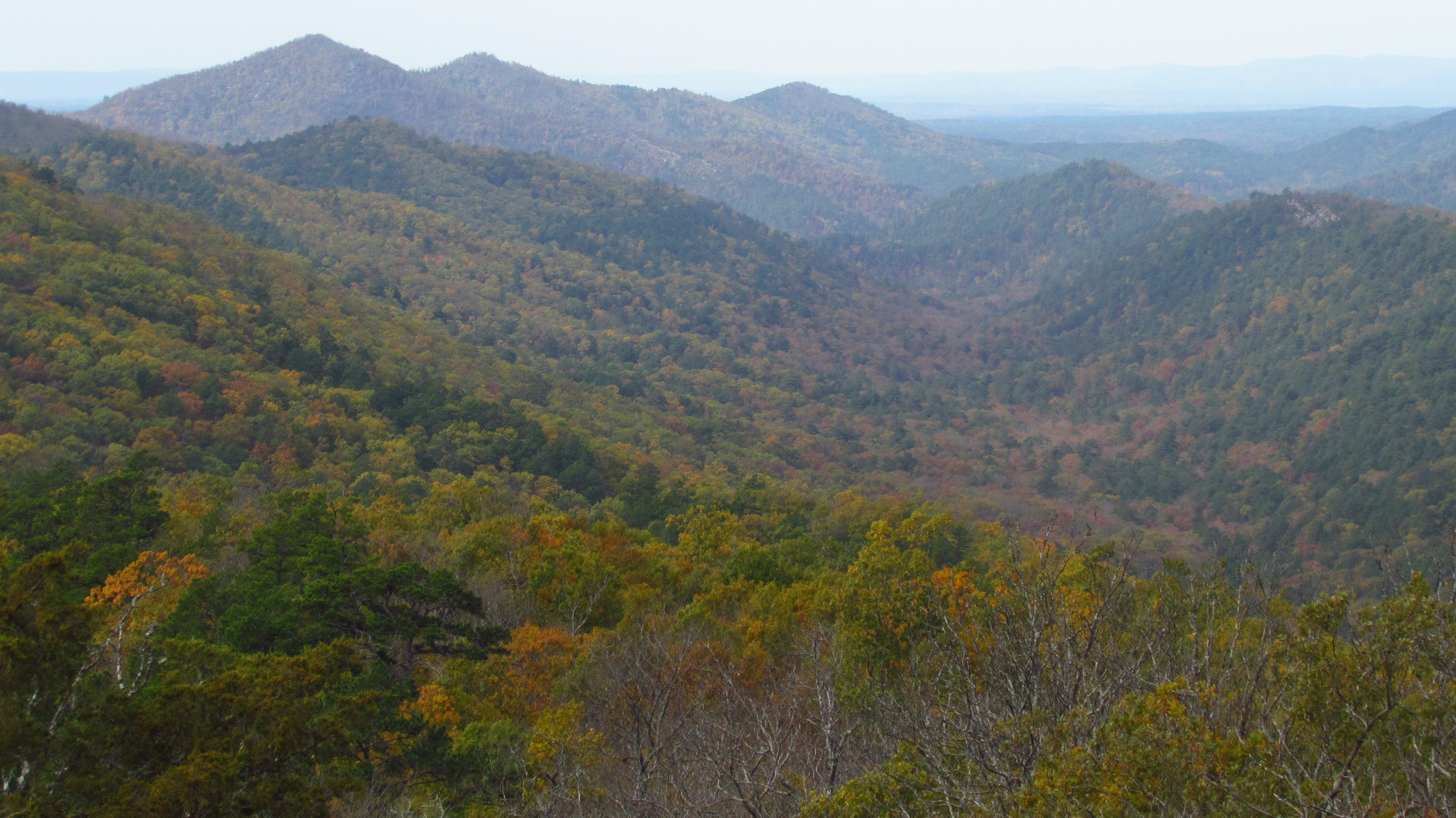
Ouachita Mountains in Arkansas

Maple-leaf oak is endemic to the Ouachita Mountains of the State of Arkansas. The geographic distribution of this species is remarkably limited. Its range covers just 24 square kilometers across locations including Sugarloaf Mountain, Magazine Mountain, Pryor Mountain, and Porter Mountain within the Ouachita Mountains. This species grows primarily on xeric sites, occupying high elevation woodland habitats with dry and rocky soils. This restricted distribution is a significant contributing factor to its endangerment status.

== Ecology ==
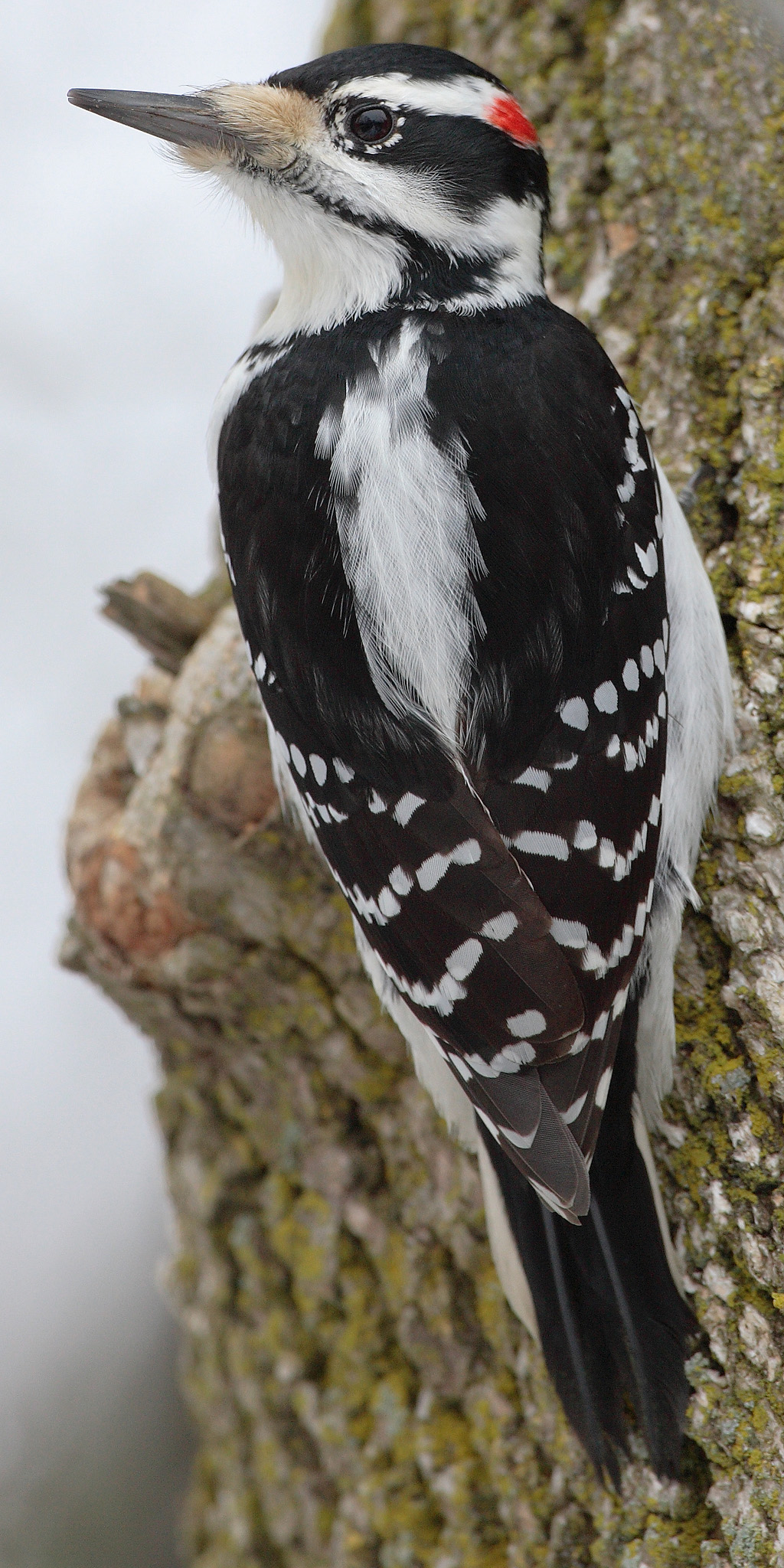
Hairy Woodpecker found in the Ouachita Mountains

The maple-leaf oak serves as a keystone species in its native ecosystems, contributing to many key ecological processes. Oak trees play a vital ecological role by contributing to nutrient cycling and soil fertility, regulating water cycles, providing habitats and food for wildlife, and sequestering carbon. The decomposition of large oak leaves provides a nutrient-rich substrate which improves soil quality and supports the microbiota communities. Oak trees also provide critical wildlife habitat in temperate forests, providing canopy shelter and nesting sites for birds and habitat for other mammals and fungi. Species of woodpeckeers, thrushes, and warblers rely on these oak trees for habitat and feed on caterpillars found on the trees during the breeding season. The acorns produced by the tree also serve as a food source for a range of wildlife in the Ouachita Mountains.

== Endangerment status and threats ==
The maple-leaf oak is listed as a critically endangered tree species in the Red List of US Oaks. The Red List was developed to identify the oak species of highest extinction concern globally. This rating scale was determined using species characteristics including geographic range, rate of decline, fragmentation, and population size. This species is considered critically imperiled due to its highly fragmented population distribution and its small population size. Fewer than 600 individuals are present in the wild, making it extremely vulnerable to extinction pressures.

Oak species such as the maple-leaf oak are at risk of extinction primarily due to climate change induced habitat shifts, habitat fragmentation and habitat destruction. This species is threatened by habitat loss throughout its fragmented range, largely attributed to anthropogenic activities such as logging and development in the Ouachita Mountains. Climate change induced range shifts also threaten the maple-leaf oak. Climate shifts throughout the world have resulted in protected habitat of endangered species becoming uninhabitable. As sessile organisms, trees often struggle to relocate establish themselves in new suitable habitat quickly enough before widespread mortality occurs. This relocation process often results in high tree mortality. Other risk factors for this species are likely to be intensified by the impacts of climate change such as pest and pathogen pressures, drought, and fire.

With a population of fewer than 600 individuals and its highly fragmented range, the maple-leaf oak is also highly susceptible to genetic bottlenecks. With fewer individuals, the genetic pool becomes smaller, increasing the likelihood of inbreeding. Under these circumstances, inbreeding depressions can occur, where deleterious traits spread throughout the population and reduce fitness of the species as a whole.

== Conservation ==
=== Challenges ===
Preserving the biodiversity of oak trees is particularly challenging due to seed type. Acorns produced by oak trees are not viable for germination once they have been dried, meaning they cannot be preserved in seedbanks unlike many other tree species. This can make ex-situ conservation efforts more intensive and costly because all reforestation must be done with living specimens.

=== Current efforts ===
There are various conservation efforts for the maple-leaf oak, but they have had limited success. The four identified native subpopulations of the species are protected; these are Sugarloaf Mountains-Midland Peak Natural Area, Mount Magazine State Park, and the Ouachita National Forest. There are also ex-situ conservation efforts in place at the Cincinnati Zoo, U.S. National Arboretum, Morton Arboretum and Missouri Botanical Garden. Groves of the tree are under cultivation in several locations, notably Stephens Lake Park Arboretum in Columbia, Missouri.

Though the species range is extremely limited, new research has identified other suitable habitat for proposed recovery efforts. Recent ecological niche modeling has identified predicted suitable habitat for Q. acerifolia in 20 counties across Arkansas and Oklahoma. Bioclimatic and topographic variables were among the most influential range predictors of the species. The results of this niche modeling have informed conservation and restoration efforts as to where Q. acerifolia can survive, providing a basis for new protected areas and human-assisted migration efforts.

Genetic research is also fundamental to the conservation efforts of Q. acerifolia. The Morton Arboretum Conservation Biology lab is conducting a detailed genetic study to assess the genetic diversity within the species. In this study, 19 microsatellite regions, specific DNA sequences used as genetic markers, were identified and analyzed to compare the genetic diversity between 316 garden and 148 wild individuals. This study will determine how well the genetic diversity of wild populations has been preserved in ex-situ populations and can influence collection strategies to uphold the species' genetic integrity.

=== Future directions ===
Conservation efforts for endangered oak species are necessary to maintain biodiversity within the genus, and protect the many ecosystems that rely on the presence of oak species. Successful conservation efforts must involve establishing more protected areas, restoration projects, community awareness, and continued research.
