= Upper Kiamichi River Wilderness =

Wilderness area in Oklahoma, United States

- IUCN category Ib (wilderness area)
- Location within the United States
- Location: Le Flore County, Oklahoma, USA
- Nearest city: Poteau, OK
- Coordinates: 34°40′N 94°32′W
- Area: 9,754 acres (39.47 km^{2})
- Established: 1988
- Governing body: U.S. Forest Service

The Upper Kiamichi River Wilderness is located in the U.S. state of Oklahoma. Created by an act of Congress in 1988, the wilderness covers an area of 9,754 acres (39.47 km^{2}). Contained within Ouachita National Forest, the wilderness is managed by the U.S. Forest Service.

The wilderness has both Pine Mountain and Rich Mountain which are two long mountain ridges that rise to over 2,600 feet (792 m) above sea level. Several streams and waterfalls flow off the ridges creating the headwaters of the Kiamichi River. Beech trees, usually found much farther north, along with pine and dense stands of oak dominate the forest. Black bears can be found in the wilderness, along with White-tailed deer, bobcat, skunk and Pheasant.

About 7 miles (11.3 km) of the Ouachita National Recreation Trail pass through the wilderness allowing hikers access to the highest mountain ridges in eastern Oklahoma.

U.S. Wilderness Areas do not allow motorized or mechanized vehicles, including bicycles. Although camping and fishing are usually allowed with a proper permit, no roads or buildings are constructed and there is also no logging or mining, in compliance with the 1964 Wilderness Act. Wilderness areas within National Forests and Bureau of Land Management areas also allow hunting in season.

== See also ==
- List of U.S. Wilderness Areas
