= Black Fork Mountain Wilderness =

Protected area in Arkansas and Oklahoma

- IUCN category Ib (wilderness area)
- Location within the United States
- Location: Polk / Scott counties, Arkansas / Le Flore County, Oklahoma, USA
- Nearest city: Mena, AR
- Coordinates: 34°42′56″N 94°25′37″W
- Area: 13,139 acres (53.17 km^{2})
- Established: 1984
- Governing body: U.S. Forest Service

The Black Fork Mountain Wilderness Area is located in the U.S. states of Arkansas and Oklahoma. Created by an act of Congress in 1984, the wilderness covers an area of 13,139 acres (53 km²). The Arkansas portion contains 8,430 acres (34.1 km^{2}) and the Oklahoma portion contains 5,140 acres (20.8 km^{2}). Located within Ouachita National Forest, the wilderness is managed by the U.S. Forest Service. The area is about 2 miles (3.2 km) north of Page, Oklahoma, and about 6 miles (9.7 km) north of Mena, Arkansas.

This infrequently visited wilderness follows the main ridgeline of Black Fork Mountain for 13 miles (21 km) which rises to more than 2,400 feet (731 m). Steep cliffsides provide sanctuary to groves of Dwarf Oak, Serviceberry and Granddaddy Greybeard (known as the fringe tree Chionanthus) which have a few unique species represented here.

There are few trails through the wilderness and none at all in the Oklahoma sections. Visitors should expect difficult hiking conditions and few sources for water as there are only two springs along the higher mountain slopes. Black bears are known to inhabit the wilderness, along with white-tailed deer, bobcat, skunk and pheasant.

The wilderness contains extensive areas of unlogged, old-growth forest. Along the ridge of Black Fork Mountain are several thousand acres of stunted old-growth Post Oak, Shortleaf Pine, and Hickory. There is also a small grove of old-growth sugar maple forest nestled in the folds of the mountain slopes.

U.S. Wilderness Areas do not allow motorized or mechanized vehicles, including bicycles. Although camping and fishing are usually allowed with a proper permit, no roads or buildings can be constructed and there is also no logging or mining, in compliance with the 1964 Wilderness Act. Wilderness areas within National Forests and Bureau of Land Management areas also allow hunting in season.

The mountain was the site of the crash of Texas International Airlines Flight 655 on September 27, 1973, in which 11 persons died.

== See also ==
- List of U.S. Wilderness Areas
- List of old growth forests
