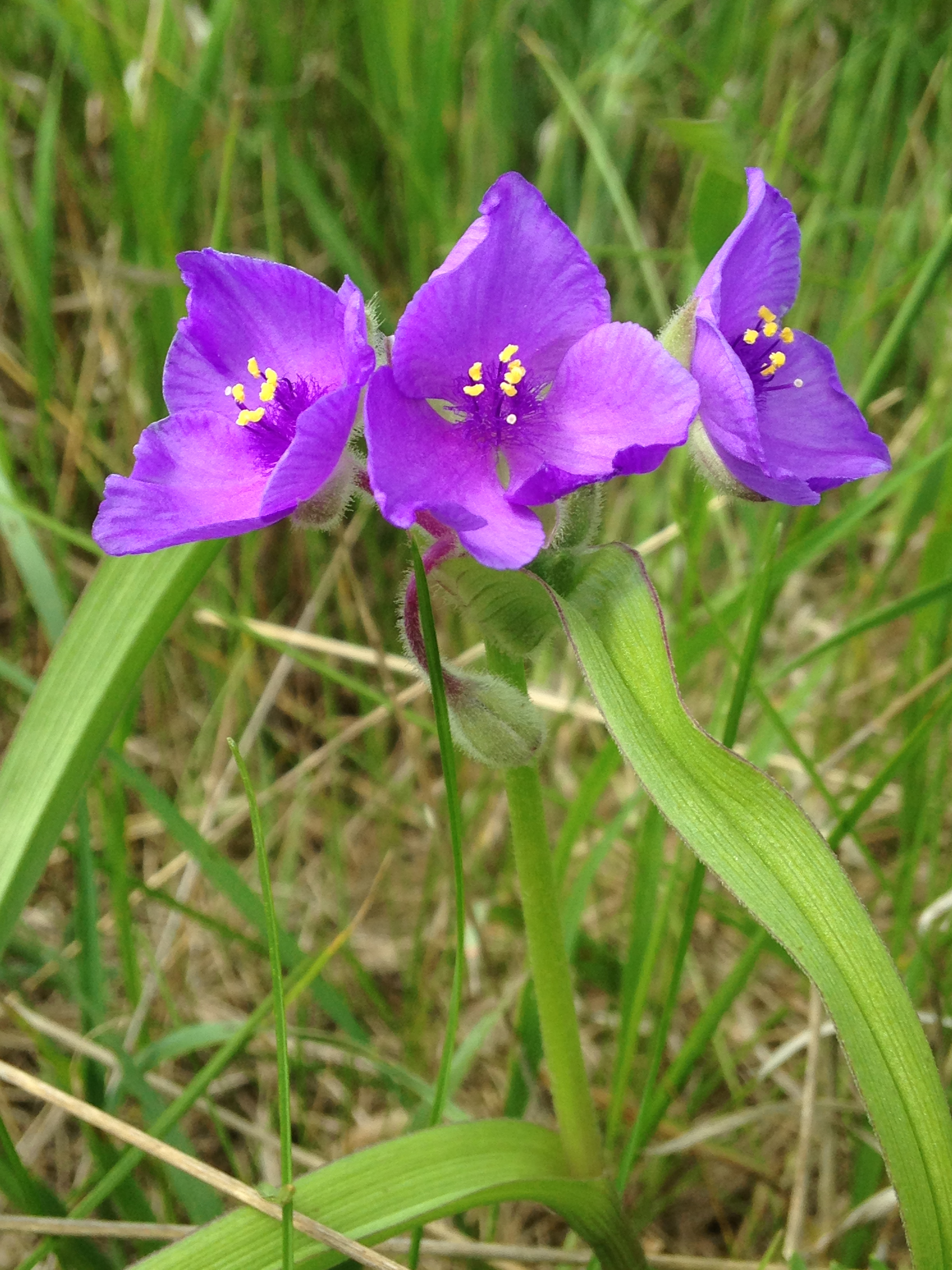
- Tradescantia bracteata

Scientific classification
- Kingdom: Plantae
- Clade: Tracheophytes
- Clade: Angiosperms
- Clade: Monocots
- Clade: Commelinids
- Order: Commelinales
- Family: Commelinaceae
- Subfamily: Commelinoideae
- Tribe: Tradescantieae
- Subtribe: Tradescantiinae
- Genus: Tradescantia
- Species: T. bracteata

Binomial name
- Tradescantia bracteata Small in Britton & A.Br.

= Tradescantia bracteata =

Species of flowering plant

Tradescantia bracteata, the longbract spiderwort, or prairie spiderwort, is a species of Tradescantia. It is native to the northern and central Great Plains and Mississippi Valley regions of the United States, from Arkansas and Oklahoma north to Minnesota and Montana, with a few isolated populations further east. It is grown for its purple flowers. It blooms from May to July in the US. A protected population of the species is found in the Sugarloaf Mountains-Midland Peak Natural Area.
