= Ouachita National Forest =

US National Forest in Arkansas and Oklahoma

- IUCN category VI (protected area with sustainable use of natural resources)
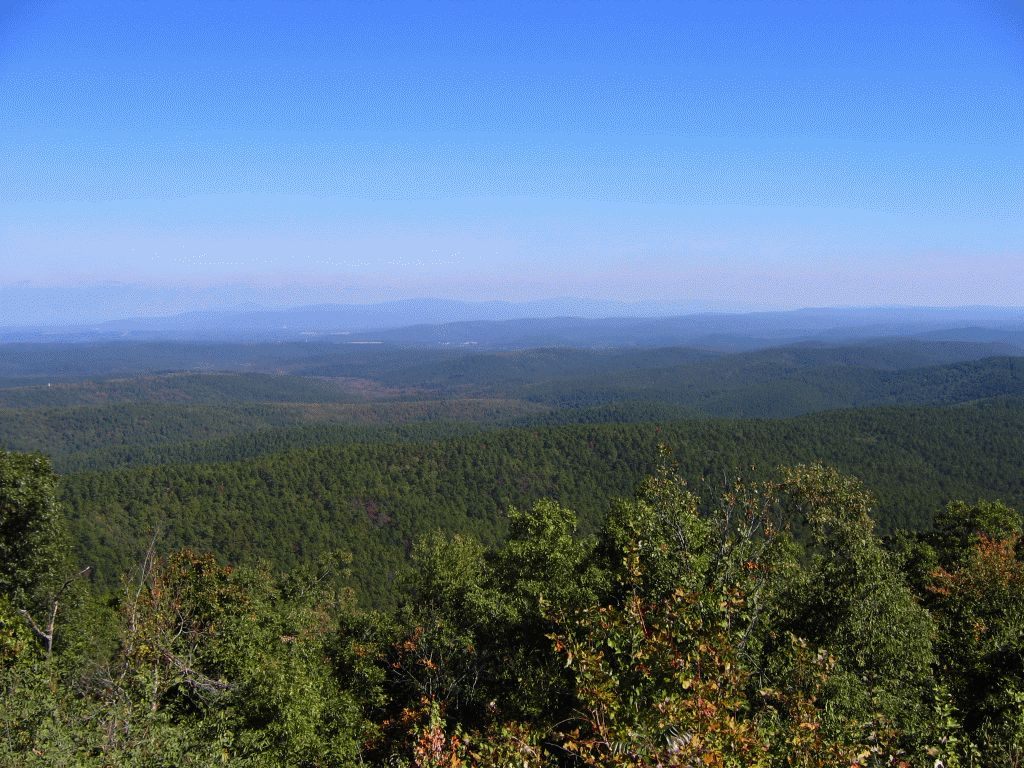
- Ouachita National Forest

- Location within the United States
- Location: Arkansas / Oklahoma, United States
- Nearest city: Hot Springs, AR
- Coordinates: 34°30′N 94°15′W
- Area: 1,784,457 acres (7,221.44 km^{2})
- Established: December 18, 1907; 118 years ago
- Governing body: U.S. Forest Service
- Website: Ouachita National Forest

The Ouachita National Forest is a vast congressionally-designated National Forest that lies in the western portion of Arkansas and portions of extreme-eastern Oklahoma, USA.

== History ==
The Ouachita National Forest is the oldest National Forest in the southern United States. The forest encompasses 1,784,457 acres (7,221 km^{2}), including most of the scenic Ouachita Mountain Range. Six locations in the forest, comprising 65,000 acres (263 km^{2}), have been congressionally-designated as wilderness areas.

Ouachita is the French spelling of the Indian word Washita, which means "good hunting grounds". The forest was known as Arkansas National Forest on its establishment on December 18, 1907; the name was changed to Ouachita National Forest on April 29, 1926.

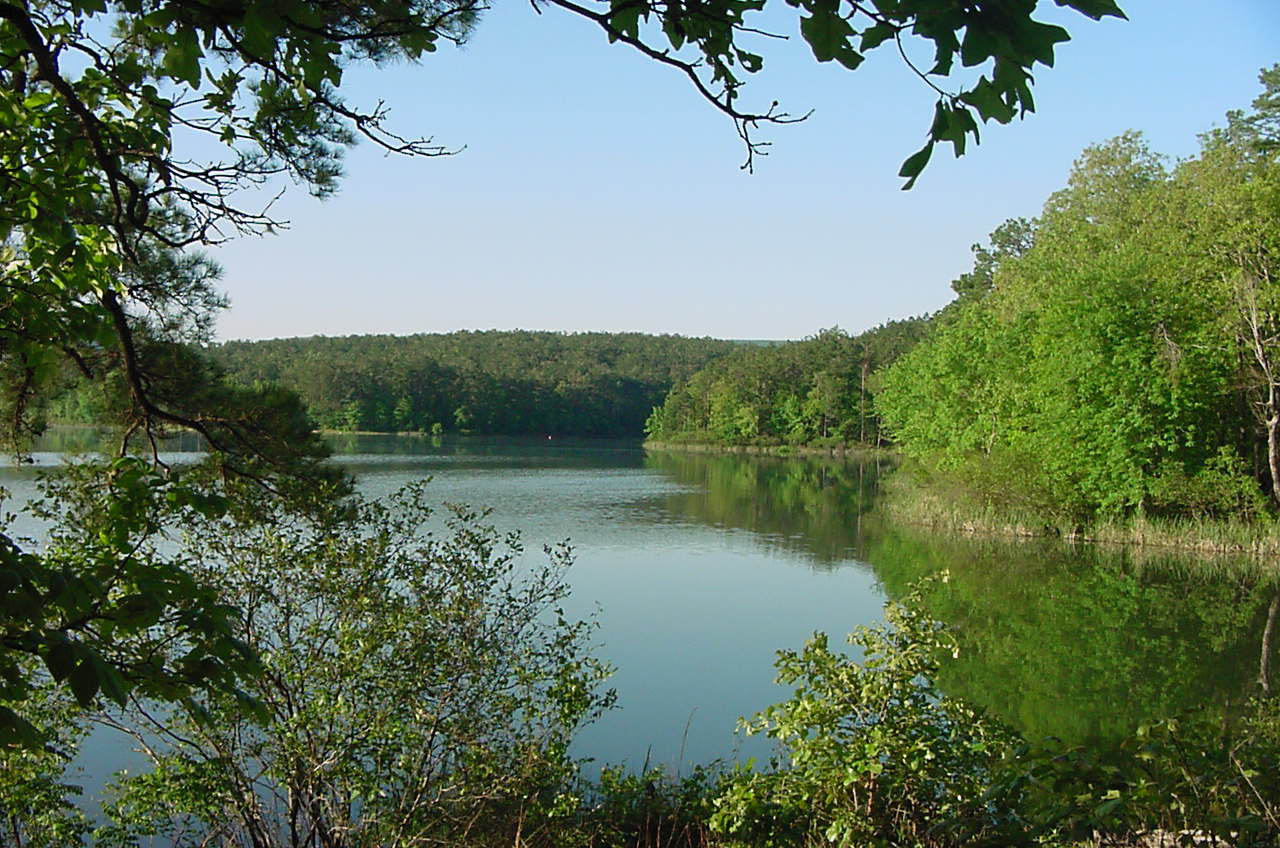
Ouachita National Forest

Rich in history, the rugged and scenic Ouachita Mountains were explored by Europeans in 1541 by Hernando de Soto's party of Spaniards. French explorers followed, flavoring the region with names like Fourche La Fave River.

The area including the forest nearly became a 165,000-acre (670 km^{2}) national park during the 1920s, but a last-minute pocket veto by President Calvin Coolidge ended the effort. The bill had been pushed by U.S. Senator Joseph T. Robinson and U.S. Representative Otis Wingo, both Democrats, and State Representative Osro Cobb, then the only Republican in the Arkansas legislature. Cobb had been invited to meet with Coolidge before the proposal was killed because of opposition from the National Park Service and the United States Department of Agriculture, presumably because of the nearby location of Hot Springs National Park. Coolidge proposed expanding the forest into Oklahoma which would be realized in 1930 when the forest was extended into Le Flore County, Oklahoma.

In a magazine article, Cobb described the area that he had sought to protect for future generations, located approximately midway between Little Rock and Shreveport, Louisiana, as within relatively easy driving distance of 45 million Americans, many of whom could not afford long trips to the national parks in the western states. He compared flora and fauna in the Ouachita forest to those of the southern Alleghenies, a division of the Appalachian Mountains. Cobb continued:

A visitor standing upon one of the many majestic peaks in the area of the proposed park is thrilled by a panoramic view that cannot be had elsewhere in the South Central States. With cheeks flushed by the invigorating mountain breezes, the mountain climber is rewarded by an inspiring view of countless and nameless peaks, mountain groups, dense forests, and inviting valleys, all merging into the distant horizon. ... there are many mountain streams, now moving slowly in narrow but deep pools, then churning with savage ferocity down some water-worn precipice, leaving in its wake snow-white sprays ... Fed by crystal springs and like so much molten silver these streams flow their turbulent courses unappreciated and rarely visited. ...

== Features ==
The endangered and rare maple-leaf oak occurs in the forest, which also contains extensive woodlands of stunted Northern Red Oak, White Oak, post oak, and Blackjack Oak at elevations over 2,500 feet (760 m) and on steep, dry slopes. Much of these woodlands, being of little commercial value, were never logged and the extent of old growth forest within them may total nearly 800,000 acres (3,200 km^{2}). There are also old-growth woodlands of Eastern Redcedar, Gum Bumelia, Winged Elm, and Yaupon along some streams. These vast unbroken reserves of old-growth forest make up the largest virgin forest in the United States, barring only the vast timber reserves in Alaska's Tongass Forest.

The Talimena Scenic Drive, which is Highway 1 in Oklahoma and Highway 88 in Arkansas, is a National Scenic Byway which meanders through the forest. The Scenic Drive passes through old-growth oak woodlands on Winding Stair and Rich Mountains.

Forest headquarters are located in Hot Springs, Arkansas.

Locations of Ouachita Mountains and Ouachita National Forest in the United States

=== Recreation ===
The forest contains a number of hiking, mountain biking and horseback riding trails. The most extensive hiking trail is the Ouachita National Recreation Trail, which traverses 223 miles (359 km) across the region. This is a well-maintained backpacking, hiking trail with overnight shelters in several portions of the trail. Mountain biking is also allowed for some sections of the trail.

Camp Clearfork was originally constructed by the Civilian Conservation Corps (CCC). Managed by the U.S. Department of Agriculture (USDA), it is on Clearfork Lake, about 20 miles (32 km) west of Hot Springs on U.S. 270. Reservations are required for camping and may be made through the Womble USDA Office. The campground has six dorm/cabins which can hold up to 10 people each, three staff cabins that hold five to six people each, a dining hall, a recreation hall and accessible flush toilets and showers.

In the Oklahoma section of the forest, the 26,445-acre (107 km^{2}) Winding Stair Mountain National Recreation Area and six other designated areas offer visitors a full range of activities with more than 150 campsites, a 90-acre (36 ha) lake and an equestrian camp.

Southeast of Idabel, the Oklahoma Department of Wildlife Conservation manages the Red Slough Wildlife Management Area, a 5,814 acres (23.53 km^{2}) wetland area donated to the USFS by The Conservation Fund in the late 1990s and early 2000s. Hunting (no lead shot) and fishing are allowed there. The area is also a destination for birdwatchers.

Canoeing and fishing are popular activities on the Mountain Fork River, Caddo River, Little Missouri River and Ouachita River within the bounds of the forest. The Cossatot River, said to be the most difficult whitewater river between the Smoky and Rocky Mountains, also passes through the forest.

Rockhounds frequent a geologic belt several miles wide containing high concentrations of very pure quartz crystals. Visitors and rock collectors are free to pick up loose crystals within the belt for personal use and may dig for quartz with the permission of the district ranger.

== Wilderness areas ==
A network of wilderness areas are found in the national forest, protecting the sections of the forest that have had the least amount of human intervention. These areas harbor some of the most rugged, scenic and secluded places in all of Arkansas and the South.

The 13,139-acre (53.2 km^{2}) Black Fork Mountain Wilderness is located in both Arkansas and Oklahoma and contains significant old-growth forests. It protects beautiful, rugged vistas and clear mountain springs.

The 9,754-acre (39.5 km^{2}) Upper Kiamichi River Wilderness is located solely in Oklahoma.

The 14,290-acre (57.8 km^{2}) Caney Creek Wilderness is located in the southwestern part of the forest in Arkansas. It is known for its rare Appalachian mixed mesophytic forest biome and high levels of biodiversity, as well as rare reserves of moist-hardwood old growth forest.

The 11,141-acre (45.1 km^{2}) Poteau Mountain Wilderness is located in the north-central range of the Ouachita mountains in Arkansas.

The 6,301-acre (25.5 km^{2}) Dry Creek Wilderness is located in the north-central ranges of the Ouachita Mountains near Magazine Mountain. It is the state's second-smallest wilderness is known for scenic overlooks and high, secluded sandstone bluffs.

The 10,181-acre (41.2 km^{2}) Flatside Wilderness is located in the extreme-eastern segment of the Ouachita National Forest, near Lake Maumelle and Little Rock. This rarely-visited wilderness has some of the highest and most panoramic views in Arkansas and winding, tumbling clear mountain streams and waterfalls.

== Counties ==
Ouachita National Forest is located in 12 counties in western and central Arkansas and two counties in southeastern Oklahoma. They are listed here in descending order of forestland within the county. Also given is their area as of 30 September 2007. Roughly 80% of the forest's area is in Arkansas, with the remaining 20% in Oklahoma. In Arkansas, there are local ranger district offices located in Booneville, Danville, Glenwood, Jessieville, Mena, Mount Ida, Oden, Perryville and Waldron. In Oklahoma, they are located in Hodgen, Talihina and north of Broken Bow. Even though the Ouachita National Forest is far from being the largest, its twelve ranger districts are the most of any in the National Forest system. The giant Tongass National Forest in Alaska is second with nine ranger district divisions.

1. Scott County, Arkansas 369,618 acres (1,495.79 km^{2})
2. Montgomery County, Arkansas 335,846 acres (1,359.12 km^{2})
3. Le Flore County, Oklahoma 221,546 acres (896.56 km^{2})
4. Polk County, Arkansas 206,400 acres (835 km^{2})
5. Yell County, Arkansas 188,835 acres (764.19 km^{2})
6. McCurtain County, Oklahoma 132,936 acres (537.97 km^{2})
7. Garland County, Arkansas 120,553 acres (487.86 km^{2})
8. Perry County, Arkansas 99,171 acres (401.33 km^{2})
9. Saline County, Arkansas 58,950 acres (238.6 km^{2})
10. Sebastian County, Arkansas 18,956 acres (76.71 km^{2})
11. Logan County, Arkansas 18,585 acres (75.21 km^{2})
12. Pike County, Arkansas 9,535 acres (38.59 km^{2})
13. Howard County, Arkansas 1,531 acres (6.20 km^{2})
14. Hot Spring County, Arkansas 320 acres (1.3 km^{2})

== Points of interest ==
- Beavers Bend Resort Park
- Beech Creek National Scenic Area
- Broken Bow Lake
- Kerr Arboretum and Botanical Area
- Ouachita National Recreation Trail
- Winding Stair Mountain National Recreation Area

== See also ==
- List of national forests of the United States
- Beech Creek National Scenic Area
- Crossett Experimental Forest
- Ozark Mountain forests
- Talimena Scenic Drive
