= Talimena Scenic Drive =

Scenic byway in the Ouachita Mountains

Talimena Scenic Drive National Forest Scenic Byway
- Talimena Scenic Drive highlighted in red

Route information
- Length: 54.0 mi (86.9 km)
- Existed: 1969–present

Location
- Country: United States
- States: Arkansas, Oklahoma

Highway system
- Scenic Byways; National; National Forest; BLM; NPS
- Arkansas Highway System; Interstate; US; State; Business; Spurs; Suffixed; Scenic; Heritage
- Oklahoma State Highway System; Interstate; US; State; Turnpikes

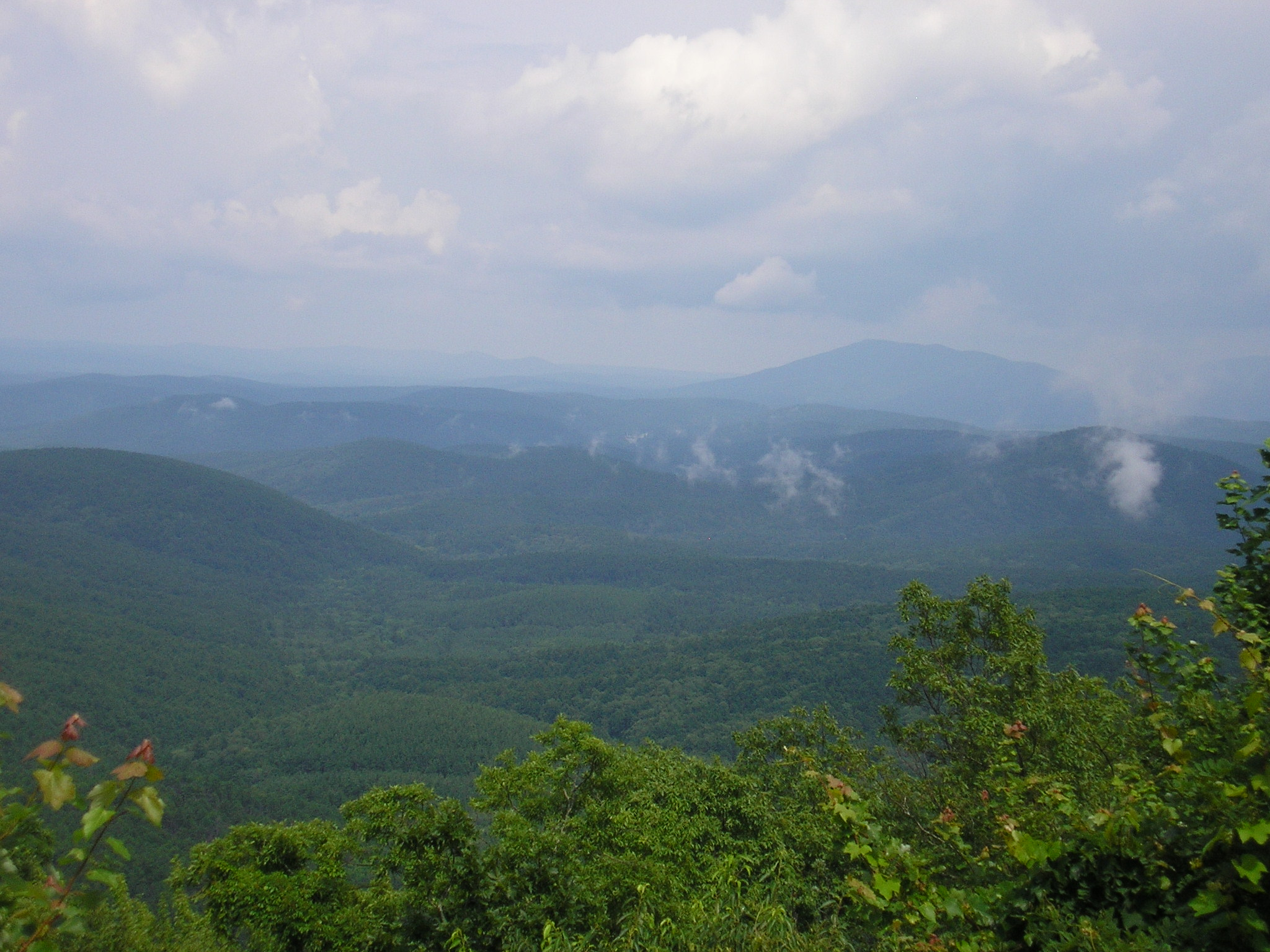
The Talimena Scenic Drive features 22 vistas along its route.

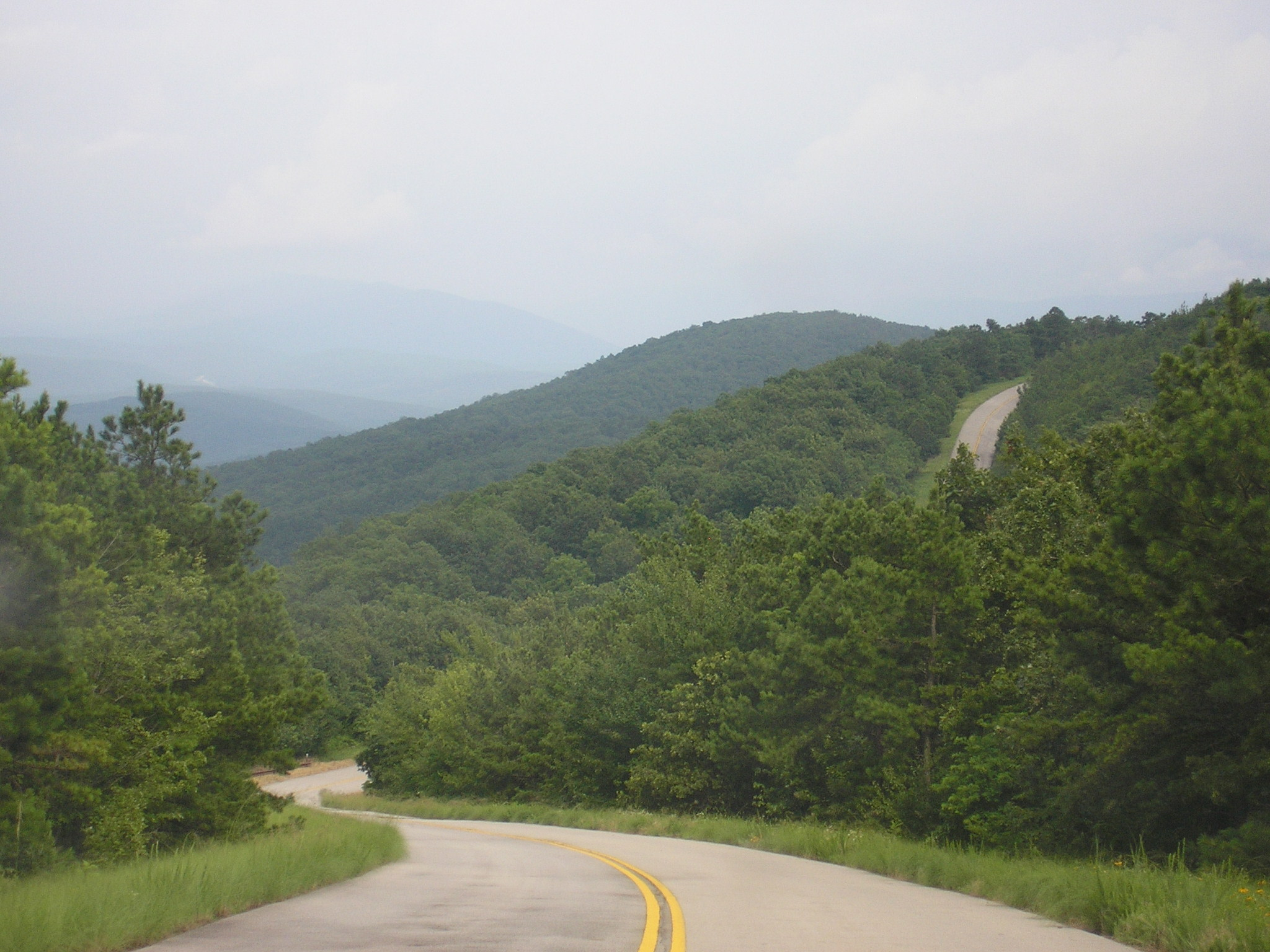
The Talimena Scenic Drive traverses the Winding Stair Mountains in the Ouachita National Forest.

The Talimena Scenic Drive is a National Scenic Byway in southeastern Oklahoma and extreme western Arkansas spanning a 54.0-mile (86.9 km) stretch of Oklahoma State Highway 1 (SH-1) and Arkansas Highway 88 (AR 88) from Talihina, Oklahoma, to Mena, Arkansas.

== Route description ==
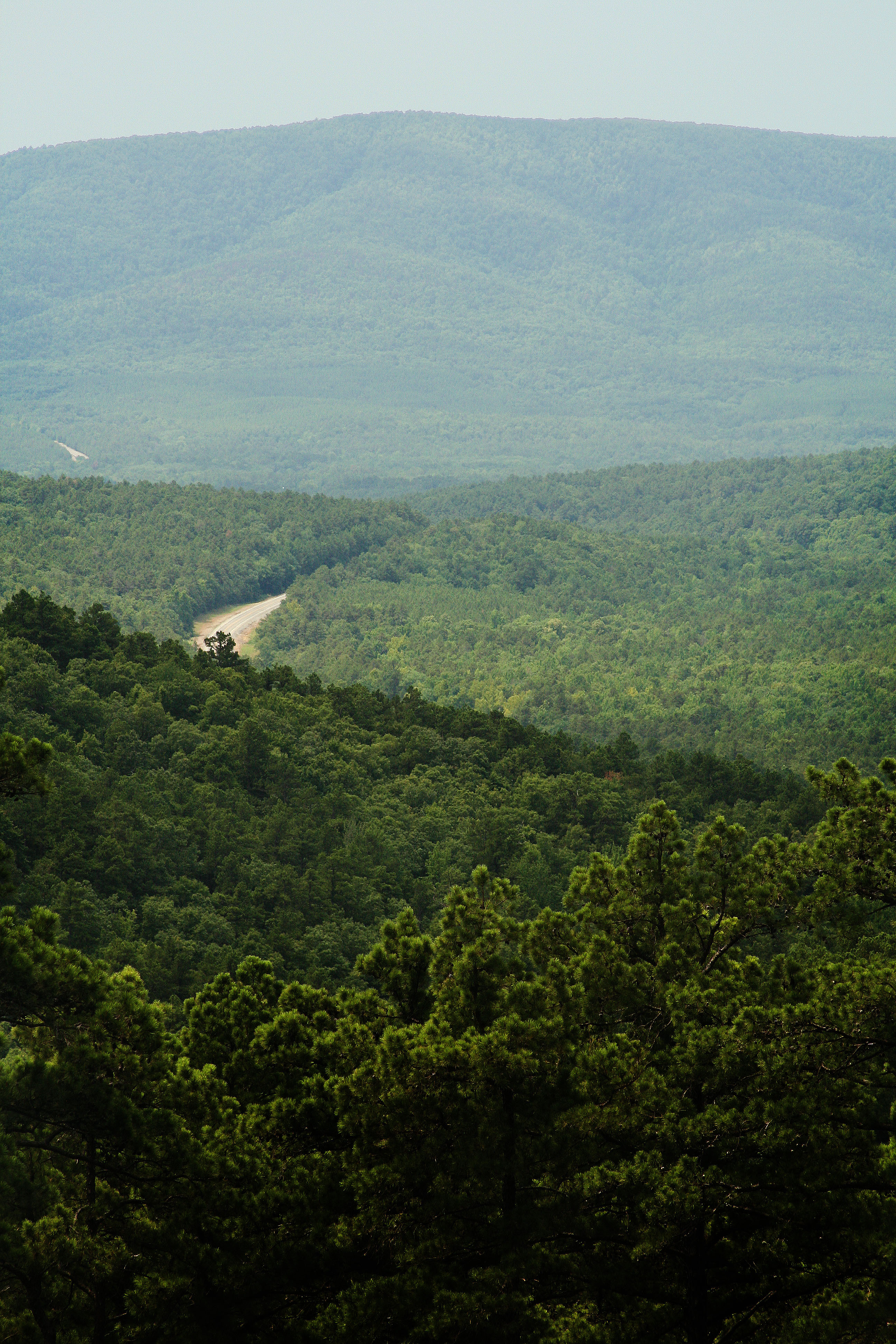

Designated a National Scenic Byway by the America's Byway Program in 2005, the road travels within the Ouachita National Forest along the highest peaks of the Winding Stair Mountains, part of the Ouachita Mountain chain, including the second tallest peak in Arkansas, Rich Mountain, 2,681 feet (817 m) in elevation. Many of the forests along these ridges, stunted and of little commercial value, were never logged and are old growth. The two-lane road features hiking trails beginning at various points along its stretch and 22 scenic vista pull-outs. There are at least 13% hill grades along the route.

== History ==
The current route opened in 1969 and formed a stretch of what would become Oklahoma State Highway 1. It was dedicated on June 7, 1970, by Lucy Baines Johnson-Nugent, the daughter of U.S. President Lyndon B. Johnson.

The roadway was designated as a National Forest Scenic Byway on February 8, 1989. It was later made an Arkansas State Scenic Byway on January 7, 1998, and an Oklahoma State Scenic Byway on October 10, 2002. The National Scenic Byway status was conferred on September 22, 2005.
