= List of census-designated places in Arkansas =

This article lists census-designated places (CDPs) in the U.S. state of Arkansas.

== Census-designated places ==
CDP	Population (2020)	County	Location of county	Notes
Acorn	376	Polk		First appeared as a CDP in the 2020 census
Alix	100	Franklin		First appeared as a CDP in the 2020 census
Alleene	97	Little River		First appeared as a CDP in the 2020 census
Alpine	134	Clark		First appeared as a CDP in the 2020 census
Aplin	100	Perry		First appeared as a CDP in the 2020 census
Appleton	399	Pope		First appeared as a CDP in the 2020 census
Armorel	320	Mississippi		First appeared as a CDP in the 2020 census
Avilla	1,325	Saline		
Batavia	328	Boone		First appeared as a CDP in the 2020 census
Bee Branch	293	Van Buren		First appeared as a CDP in the 2020 census
Beirne	36	Clark		First appeared as a CDP in the 2020 census
Bethesda	199	Independence		First appeared as a CDP in the 2020 census
Bismarck	229	Hot Spring		First appeared as a CDP in the 2020 census
Board Camp	87	Polk		First appeared as a CDP in the 2020 census
Boles	166	Scott		First appeared as a CDP in the 2020 census
Bowman	75	Craighead		First appeared as a CDP in the 2020 census
Buffalo City	26	Baxter		First appeared as a CDP in the 2020 census
Caddo Gap	39	Montgomery		First appeared as a CDP in the 2020 census
Canehill	74	Washington		First appeared as a CDP in the 2020 census
Center Point	179	Howard		First appeared as a CDP in the 2020 census
Center Ridge	290	Conway		
Centerville	283	Yell		First appeared as a CDP in the 2020 census
Cherokee City	73	Benton		
Cincinnati	306	Washington		First appeared as a CDP in the 2020 census
College Station	469	Pulaski		
Collins	149	Drew		First appeared as a CDP in the 2020 census
Crystal Springs	129	Garland		First appeared as a CDP in the 2020 census
Deer	135	Newton		First appeared as a CDP in the 2020 census
Dennard	496	Van Buren		
Desha	715	Independence		First appeared as a CDP in the 2020 census
Dora	121	Crawford		First appeared as a CDP in the 2020 census
Drasco	144	Cleburne		First appeared as a CDP in the 2020 census
East End	7,137	Saline		
Edgemont	56	Cleburne		First appeared as a CDP in the 2020 census
El Paso	267	White		First appeared as a CDP in the 2020 census
Evansville	102	Washington		First appeared as a CDP in the 2020 census
Fair Oaks	55	Cross		First appeared as a CDP in the 2020 census
Floral	109	Independence		First appeared as a CDP in the 2020 census
Floyd	377	White		First appeared as a CDP in the 2020 census
Fox	237	Stone		First appeared as a CDP in the 2020 census
Gamaliel	33	Baxter		First appeared as a CDP in the 2020 census
Genoa	972	Miller		First appeared as a CDP in the 2020 census
Gibson	4,111	Pulaski		
Goodwin	113	St. Francis		First appeared as a CDP in the 2020 census
Gregory	43	Woodruff		First appeared as a CDP in the 2020 census
Hagarville	142	Johnson		
Halley	44	Desha		First appeared as a CDP in the 2020 census
Hattieville	132	Conway		First appeared as a CDP in the 2020 census
Henderson	309	Baxter		First appeared as a CDP in the 2020 census
Hensley	137	Pulaski		
Hot Springs Village	15,861	Garland and Saline		
Indian Bay	15	Monroe		First appeared as a CDP in the 2020 census
Ivan	135	Dallas		First appeared as a CDP in the 2020 census
Jerome	24	Drew		First appeared as a CDP in 2022, previously a town
Jerusalem	137	Conway		First appeared as a CDP in the 2020 census
Jones Mills	411	Hot Spring		First appeared as a CDP in the 2020 census
Kingston	97	Madison		First appeared as a CDP in the 2020 census
Kirby	721	Pike		
Lacey	139	Drew		First appeared as a CDP in the 2020 census
Lake Hamilton	2,084	Garland		
Landmark	3,585	Pulaski		
Lawson	260	Union		First appeared as a CDP in the 2020 census
Lost Bridge Village	397	Benton		
McAlmont	1,447	Pulaski		
Magnet Cove	692	Hot Spring		
Maysville	117	Benton		
Midway	1,036	Baxter		
Monroe	51	Monroe		First appeared as a CDP in the 2020 census
Morrow	263	Washington		First appeared as a CDP in the 2020 census
Mount Holly	123	Union		First appeared as a CDP in the 2020 census
Mount Judea	110	Newton		First appeared as a CDP in the 2020 census
Mount Olive	17	Izard		First appeared as a CDP in the 2020 census
Natural Steps	413	Pulaski		
New Blaine	173	Logan		
New Edinburg	134	Cleveland		
Newhope	169	Pike		First appeared as a CDP in the 2020 census
North Crossett	2,756	Ashley		
Oak Grove	177	Pope		First appeared as a CDP in the 2020 census
Oakland	72	Marion		First appeared as a CDP in the 2020 census
Oark	43	Johnson		First appeared as a CDP in the 2020 census
Oneida	13	Phillips		First appeared as a CDP in the 2020 census
Ozark Acres	692	Sharp		First appeared as a CDP in the 2020 census
Ozone	92	Johnson		First appeared as a CDP in the 2020 census
Payneway	241	Poinsett		First appeared as a CDP in the 2020 census
Pearcy	306	Garland		First appeared as a CDP in the 2020 census
Pencil Bluff	72	Montgomery		First appeared as a CDP in the 2020 census
Piney	5,238	Garland		
Pleasant Grove	235	Stone		First appeared as a CDP in the 2020 census
Ponca	30	Newton		First appeared as a CDP in the 2020 census
Poplar Grove	215	Phillips		First appeared as a CDP in the 2020 census
Prairie Creek	2,217	Benton		
Princeton	13	Dallas		First appeared as a CDP in the 2020 census
Reader	40	Nevada and Ouachita		
Rivervale	46	Poinsett		First appeared as a CDP in the 2020 census
Rockwell	4,548	Garland		
Roland	820	Pulaski		
Rover	159	Yell		First appeared as a CDP in the 2020 census
Rye	123	Cleveland		
Salado	472	Independence		First appeared as a CDP in the 2020 census
Salem	2,544	Saline		
Saratoga	124	Hempstead and Howard		First appeared as a CDP in the 2020 census
Sardis	833	Saline		First appeared as a CDP in the 2020 census
Scott	97	Pulaski and Lonoke		
Springfield	223	Conway		First appeared as a CDP in the 2020 census
Staves	133	Cleveland		
Sulphur Springs	1,032	Jefferson		
Summers	166	Washington		First appeared as a CDP in the 2020 census
Sweet Home	712	Pulaski		
Tucker	95	Jefferson		First appeared as a CDP in the 2020 census
Tumbling Shoals	902	Cleburne		
Uniontown	112	Crawford		First appeared as a CDP in the 2020 census
Urbana	177	Union		First appeared as a CDP in the 2020 census
Vanndale	339	Cross		First appeared as a CDP in the 2020 census
Violet Hill	36	Izard		First appeared as a CDP in the 2020 census
Walcott	152	Greene		First appeared as a CDP in the 2020 census
Warm Springs	47	Randolph		First appeared as a CDP in the 2020 census
Wayton	148	Newton		First appeared as a CDP in the 2020 census
Wesley	161	Madison		First appeared as a CDP in the 2020 census
West Crossett	1,144	Ashley		
Wilburn	132	Cleburne		First appeared as a CDP in the 2020 census
Witts Springs	33	Searcy		First appeared as a CDP in the 2020 census
Woodlawn	174	Cleveland		
Woodson	346	Pulaski		
Yarborough Landing	457	Little River		

== Former Census-Designated Places ==
CDP	Population (2020)	County	Location of county	Notes
Holiday Island	2,533	Carroll		Incorporated as a city in November 2020

== See also ==
- List of cities and towns in Arkansas
- List of places in Arkansas
