= Tornado outbreak of November 27–28, 2005 =

Weather event in the United States

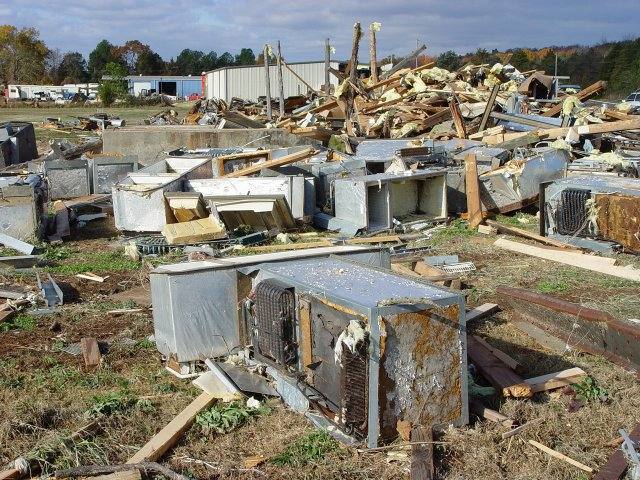
- Tornado damage near Plumerville, AR from November 27, 2005

Meteorological history
- Formed: November 27, 2005
- Dissipated: November 28, 2005

Tornado outbreak
- Tornadoes: 73
- Max. rating: F3 tornado
- Duration: 29 hours, 42 minutes

Overall effects
- Fatalities: 2
- Injuries: 15
- Damage: $7.2 million
- Areas affected: Kansas, Missouri, Arkansas, Louisiana, Mississippi, Alabama

On November 27 and 28, 2005, a substantial outbreak of tornadoes occurred in the Central United States. It was the fourth and final major outbreak of the unusually active month; the other three occurring on November 6, 12 and 15. In addition, the same system produced a major blizzard in the northern and western Great Plains. Overall, the outbreak resulted in two fatalities, one in Missouri and the other in Arkansas.

== Confirmed tornadoes ==
Confirmed tornadoes by Fujita rating
| FU | F0 | F1 | F2 | F3 | F4 | F5 | Total |
|---|---|---|---|---|---|---|---|
| 0 | 28 | 30 | 12 | 3 | 0 | 0 | 73 |

=== November 27 event ===
| F# | Location | County | Time (UTC) | Path length | Damage |
|---|---|---|---|---|---|
Kansas
| F0 | NE of Marion | Marion | 1948 | 0.1 miles | Brief tornado with no damage. |
| F0 | E of Eastshore to NW of Lost Springs | Marion | 1948 | 13 miles | Landspout tornado remained over open country with no damage reported. |
| F0 | E of Antelope | Marion | 1950 | 2 miles | Landspout tornado damaged outbuildings. |
| F0 | NE of Lincolnville | Marion | 2004 | 0.1 miles | Brief tornado with no damage. |
| F0 | W of Burdick | Morris | 2005 | 0.3 miles | Brief tornado that caused no damage. |
| F1 | Delavan to S of Wreford | Morris, Geary | 2012 | 20 miles | Damage occurred on several farmsteads, where several outbuildings were damaged or destroyed. Roofing material from one building was stuck in a fence a mile away to the north. The tornado also struck the Geary State Fishing Lake and Wildlife Area before dissipating. |
| F0 | E of Pearl | Dicksinson | 2032 | 1.5 miles | Brief tornado with no damage. |
| F0 | W of Wilsey | Morris | 2032 | 6 miles | Brief tornado with no damage. |
| F0 | SW of Hartford | Lyon | 2035 | 1 mile | Caused minor damage to outbuildings on three farmsteads and several other outbuildings along its path. The parent thunderstorm was a mini-supercell within a bow echo. |
| F0 | NE of Cherryvale | Montgomery | 2048 | 0.1 miles | Brief touchdown with no damage. |
| F0 | WSW of Dwight | Morris | 2058 | 0.3 miles | Brief touchdown with no damage. |
| F1 | Southern Fort Riley to W of Ogden | Geary, Riley | 2209 | 2 miles | At Fort Riley, 32 homes sustained minor damage at the housing area. Trees, cars, and a cemetery were damaged as well. |
| F0 | SE of Junction City | Geary | 2215 | 0.3 miles | Brief touchdown with no damage. |
| F0 | E of Grandview Plaza | Geary | 2221 | 2 miles | Caused minor damage to a hay barn, and also destroyed an indoor horse riding barn. Pieces of the barn landed a half mile away. Authorities also had to close Interstate 70 for a short time until the tornado had passed. |
| F0 | Western Keats | Riley | 2228 | 0.3 miles | Tornado briefly touched down on the west-southwest side of town, causing minor tree damage. |
| F0 | E of Riley | Riley | 2132 | 0.3 miles | Tornado damaged a barn. |
| F0 | E of Winkler | Riley | 2149 | 0.3 miles | Minor tree damage occurred. |
| F1 | ENE of Erie to WSW of Stark | Neosho | 2206 | 6 miles | At the beginning of its path, the tornado produced F1 damage to homes, outbuildings and trees. Thereafter, the tornado weakened, and produced F0 damage before dissipating. |
| F0 | SE of Elsmore | Allen | 2222 | 0.2 miles | Brief tornado with no damage. |
Missouri
| F0 | N of Dudenville | Jasper | 2319 | 0 miles | Extremely brief tornado with no damage. |
| F1 | ENE of Pratherville to NE of Lawson | Clay, Ray | 2344 | 11 miles | The tornado hit the west side of Excelsior Springs, a manufacturing plant suffered wall damage and there was a partial roof collapse. The plant's conveyor line was also damaged. Windows were blown out at a car dealership and trees were damaged as well. |
| F1 | Lawson | Ray | 2359 | 2 miles | A second tornado struck shortly Lawson shortly after the first. Multiple homes, a barn, and trees were damaged just north of town. |
| F1 | N of Vidette, AR | Ozark | 0042 | 1 mile | Damage was limited to trees. |
| F1 | Bakersfield | Howell | 0046 | 3 miles | Damage was mostly limited to trees, although two people were injured. |
| F1 | E of Pottersville | Howell | 0056 | 5 miles | A frame house and a mobile home were heavily damaged. Two people were injured. |
| F2 | SSW of Gatewood to NW of Briar | Ripley | 0430 | 12 miles | 1 death - A two-story house was destroyed, resulting in a fatality. Two mobile homes were unroofed and many trees were snapped and uprooted. |
| F0 | Northwestern Maplewood | St. Louis | 0505 | 0.5 miles | Tornado downed a utility pole, damaged the roof of a restaurant, and tore an air conditioning unit off of another restaurant. Cars were moved and a tractor-trailer was flipped. Windows were blown out at a Walmart as well. |
Arkansas
| F1 | S of Bluffton to SW of Briggsville | Yell | 2140 | 4.5 miles | Trees were snapped and uprooted, and power lines were downed. |
| F0 | SSW of Danville | Yell | 2157 | 2.7 miles | Tornado downed trees and power lines, and tore tin roofing from a chicken house. |
| F1 | S of Kirby to E of Glenwood | Pike | 2225 | 13.8 miles | Tornado removed the roof of a barn, and damaged or destroyed several chicken houses. A roof was also partially removed from a mobile home. Numerous trees were downed as well. One person was injured. |
| F1 | E of Glenwood to N of Welsh | Montgomery | 2242 | 3.2 miles | Damage was limited to trees. |
| F1 | WNW of Bonnerdale to E of Mazarn | Montgomery | 2249 | 4.5 miles | Tornado downed trees and power lines. |
| F1 | E of Alamo to SSW of Crystal Springs | Garland | 2256 | 3.5 miles | Tornado caused mostly tree and power line damage and also destroyed a hay barn. |
| F1 | N of Bear | Garland | 2310 | 1.2 miles | Tornado snapped trees, and damaged docks and boats at Lake Ouachita. |
| F2 | SE of Bonnerdale to SW of Pearcy | Hot Spring | 2320 | 4.2 miles | A tornado caused mainly tree and power line damage. |
| F1 | SE of Chimes to NW of Woolum | Van Buren | 2323 | 2.8 miles | The tornado destroyed a barn, a shop, and a storage shed. A number of power poles and power lines were blown down as well. |
| F2 | SSW of Pearcy to N of Piney | Garland | 2326 | 13.8 miles | Tornado rolled a mobile home into a tree near Pearcy, injuring one person. In the same area, several homes had mainly roof damage. The tornado then hit areas on the west side of Lake Hamilton, with structural damage to several homes and docks destroyed. Along the way, numerous trees were uprooted or snapped, with power lines downed. |
| F1 | NNW of Woolum | Searcy | 2327 | 2.7 miles | The tornado downed trees and power lines, and caused roof damage to several homes. |
| F1 | NW of Jessieville | Garland | 2330 | 2.1 miles | The tornado tracked through the Ouachita National Forest, snapping off and blowing down hundreds of trees. |
| F1 | N of Jessieville to S of Deberrie | Saline | 2332 | 6.1 miles | Another tornado tracked through the Ouachita National Forest, snapping off and blowing down hundreds of trees. |
| F2 | N of Adona to SW of Morrilton | Conway | 2337 | 3.9 miles | Tornado downed numerous trees, caused minor roof damage to a few homes, and damaged or destroyed outbuildings. |
| F3 | SSW of Williams Junction to S of Oppello | Perry | 2341 | 19 miles | Worst damage occurred in the Cherry Hill area. The tornado initially tracked through the Ouachita National Forest where hundreds of trees were either snapped off or blown down. Once emerging from the forest area, the tornado downed 11 large steel transmission towers. As the tornado continued tracking to the northeast, a sawmill was destroyed, along with several houses. Several dozen other houses sustained damage and several mobile homes were overturned. Numerous vehicles were damaged or destroyed, as well as a number of barns and outbuildings. Several chicken houses also sustained damage, and power lines were downed. |
| F2 | SSW of Blackwell | Pope | 2342 | 2.3 miles | Tornado downed numerous trees and power lines. |
| F2 | Blackwell to E of Wonderview | Conway | 2345 | 11.8 miles | Tornado downed numerous trees, caused minor roof damage to a few homes, and damaged or destroyed outbuildings. The tornado also destroyed a liquor store as it crossed Interstate 40 in Blackwell. |
| F3 | S of Oppello | Conway | 0000 | 2 miles | A strong tornado downed numerous power lines and power poles. |
| F3 | SE of Lewisburg to Springfield | Conway | 0009 | 15 miles | 1 death - At the beginning of the path, the tornado crossed Interstate 40 and tossed several vehicles, resulting in a fatality and seven injuries. In the same area, a lumber company was badly damaged. The tornado then moved through Hill Creek before dissipating just after passing through Springfield. A large barn that contained several boats and vehicles was destroyed, homes and businesses were heavily damaged or destroyed, and a fire station, numerous barns, outbuildings, and chicken houses were damaged. Mobile homes were overturned as well. There were hundreds of trees, power lines and power poles downed along the path. A total of eight people were injured. |
| F1 | SE of Buford to SE of Mountain Home | Baxter | 0015 | 3.7 miles | A barn roof was damaged and an outbuilding was destroyed. Trees were damaged as well. |
| F1 | S of Williams Junction | Perry | 0025 | 0.8 miles | Several houses had roof damage and some trees were downed. |
| F1 | NNE of Paron | Pulaski | 0026 | 2.2 miles | An old auto service garage was badly damaged and several homes had roof damage. Numerous trees and power lines were downed as well. |
| F2 | NNW of Springfield to Martinville | Conway | 0027 | 6.1 miles | Several homes had roofs blown off and a couple of mobile homes destroyed. About 3 miles northeast of Springfield, a collision repair and auto customizing shop was destroyed when a nearby mobile home was thrown into the business. Numerous trees, power poles and power lines were also knocked down. |
| F2 | W of Damascus | Faulkner | 0034 | 2.6 miles | Numerous trees and power lines were downed. Several homes also sustained minor roof damage. |
| F2 | W of Damascus to Bee Branch to SW of Eglantine | Van Buren | 0037 | 13.1 miles | Numerous barns and outbuildings either damaged or destroyed. A number of cars were damaged, and a few of which were overturned. Several mobile homes were damaged or destroyed and numerous trees, power poles and power lines were knocked down. |
| F1 | S of Bakersfield, MO | Fulton | 0040 | 1.3 miles | A tornado caused mostly tree damage. There was also some damage to a house and two barns. |
| F1 | SSW of Eglantine to SW of Shirley | Van Buren | 0055 | 3.7 miles | A few trees were snapped. |
| F1 | S of Wooster to Greenbrier | Faulkner | 0059 | 7.7 miles | A damaging tornado struck Greenbrier, where some outbuildings were destroyed, as was a dugout at a junior high school in Greenbrier. Many trees were blown down as well. Homes and mobile homes were damaged outside of town. |
| F1 | SW of Higden | Cleburne | 0102 | 2.7 miles | Trees were downed and the roof of a mobile home was damaged. |
| F0 | NE of Greenbrier to E of Guy | Faulkner | 0111 | 4 miles | Caused minor roof damage to a house and a barn. A couple of small outbuildings were destroyed as well. |
| F2 | NW of Enders to NE of Guy | Van Buren | 0119 | 0.8 miles | Brief, but strong tornado caused some tree damage. |
| F2 | W of Quitman to N of Pearson | Cleburne | 0120 | 9.2 miles | Tornado tore the roofs off of several houses and also destroyed a mobile home, a camper, a chicken house, and a few barns and outbuildings. Several other chicken houses were damaged, as well as some vehicles. Hundreds of trees, power lines, and power poles were downed. One person was injured. |
| F0 | NE of Woodrow to ENE of Prim | Cleburne | 0147 | 1.2 miles | Tornado heavily damaged a barn, tore part of the roof from a chicken house, and downed trees. |
| F1 | NE of Franklin to W of Ash Flat | Izard | 0155 | 5.8 miles | The tornado overturned two mobile homes, as well as a travel trailer. Several homes sustained roof damage. A pontoon boat was overturned and another was destroyed. |
| F1 | W of Ash Flat | Sharp | 0201 | 0.4 miles | Damage was limited to trees. |
| F1 | W of Ash Flat to NW of Cherokee Village | Fulton | 0202 | 5.8 miles | Several barns and outbuildings were damaged, and a few houses also sustained roof damage. Many trees and power lines were downed along the path. |
| F2 | W of Marcella to Pleasant Grove | Stone | 0205 | 7 miles | Tornado struck the northwestern side of Pleasant Grove. It tore the porch off of a house and damaged the roof. A roof was removed from a barn with another barn roof damaged. Several homes had roof damage, and a shed was destroyed. Hundreds of trees were downed, with one tree landing on a flatbed truck. |
| F1 | Pangburn | White | 0244 | 2 miles | Tornado moved directly through Pangburn, destroying a travel trailer and overturning a shed. There was also damage to the roof of a home and a barn and some trees were downed. |

=== November 28 event ===
| F# | Location | County | Time (UTC) | Path length | Damage |
|---|---|---|---|---|---|
Louisiana
| F0 | ESE of Louisiana | West Carroll | 0724 | 0.5 miles | Tornado blew a section of tin roof off a shop. The tin was blown into the tops of trees where several limbs were broken off. Additionally, a home had shingles blown off the roof. |
Mississippi
| F0 | ESE of Glen Allan | Washington | 0756 | 1 mile | Tornado blew a small piece of the roof off a church, damaged the back porch of a house, and downed a few trees. |
Alabama
| F0 | NNE of Robbins Crossroads | Jefferson | 2010 | 0.1 miles | A few trees were blown down. One home received roof damage and the front porch was destroyed. Debris was scattered 200 to 300 yards away. One other building sustained minor damage. A large fifth wheel trailer weighing about 3,000 pounds was moved over 20 feet. |
| F0 | W of Dolomite | Jefferson | 2040 | 0.4 miles | Several trees and large limbs were blown down along the path. Several sheds were overturned, a satellite dish was damaged and at least five homes sustained roof damage. |
| F0 | N of Summerfield | Dallas | 2253 | 5.8 miles | A tornado struck the northwestern, northern, and northeastern side of Summerfield. Numerous large trees were snapped off and uprooted. A few homes and mobile homes sustained shingle damage. One large tree fell on a home and caused damage, and a mobile home was pushed off of its foundation. Several sheds or out-buildings sustained moderate damage as well. |
| F0 | W of Autaugaville to White Water | Autauga | 0041 | 5.4 miles | Numerous large trees were snapped off and uprooted, and a garage attached to a mobile home was blown away. At another location, vinyl siding was blown off a house and a fence was blown down. One shed was totally destroyed, and some tin was peeled off of a steel building. |
| F0 | N of Weoka | Elmore | 0130 | 0.1 miles | A few trees were snapped. |
| F1 | ENE of Weoka | Coosa | 0144 | 0.4 miles | One home sustained roof damage and a pool shed was destroyed. Several pine trees were snapped as well. |

== See also ==
- List of tornadoes and tornado outbreaks
