= Lake Hamilton High School =

Location
- 280 Wolf Street; Pearcy, Arkansas 71964; United States; 34°26′27″N 93°12′51″W

Information
- School type: Public comprehensive
- Status: Open
- School district: Lake Hamilton School District
- CEEB code: 041155
- NCES School ID: 050861000575
- Teaching staff: 48.95 (FTE)
- Grades: 10–12
- Enrollment: 901 (2023-2024)
- Education system: ADE Smart Core curriculum
- Classes offered: Regular, Career Focus, Advanced Placement
- Colors: Maroon and gold
- Mascot: Wolves
- Team name: Lake Hamilton Wolves
- Rivals: Hot Springs Lakeside Rams
- Accreditation: ADE; AdvancED (2011–)
- Website: www.lhwolves.net/o/lhhs

Lake Hamilton High School is a public secondary school for grades 10 through 12 located in Pearcy, Arkansas, located near Lake Hamilton and Lake Catherine. LHHS supports more than 900 students with more than 50 educators.

== Academics ==
LHHS is accredited by the Arkansas Department of Education (ADE) and has been accredited by AdvancED since 2011. Students compete a program of study that completes with the ADE Smart Core curriculum. Lake Hamilton offers a variety of educational programs, including English as a Second Language (ESL), Advanced Placement (AP), character and drug education programs, homeless child and youth programs, career and technical education, and special needs and special education classes.

Senior high students may take advantage of the accelerated classes in the core content areas which provide challenging curricular materials to meet their needs. In addition, students may choose Pre-AP and Advanced Placement classes in the University Studies Program, which provide college level material and college credit by examination. Concurrent credit in academic classes is also available through National Park Community College.

== Extracurricular activities ==
The Lake Hamilton mascot for academic and athletic teams in the Wolves with maroon and gold serving as the school colors.

=== Clubs and traditions ===
The Lake Hamilton Band Program, known as The Lake Hamilton Powerband of Arkansas, is the 2018, 2019, 2023, and 2024 6A State Champions as well as the State Champion runner-up in 2020, 2021, and 2022. In 2019 and 2023 the Powerband became Bands of America Grand National Semi-Finalists. After the 2022 marching season, the band was honored as one of the few programs that were invited to the Macy's Thanksgiving Day Parade in 2024. The program has also found success in their concert group as well being the 2022 6A State Concert Band Champions. In 2018 the band placed 1st in Class Scholastic A at the WGI Winds World Championship.

In November 2007, the Lake Hamilton FFA Chapter's poultry judging team represented Arkansas at the National FFA Poultry Contest and finished third, with three team members winning scholarships. Other recent past state champions include Prepared Public Speaking in 2009, Nursery/Landscape in 2005, Floriculture in 1998 and 2004, Livestock in 2003, Ag Mechanics in 1997, 1998, 1999, 2000 and 2002, Poultry in 1999 and 2001, Farm Business in 2000, Creed Speaking in 2014, and Food Science in 2014.

=== Athletics ===
The Wolves compete in the state's 6A classification administered by the Arkansas Activities Association. Interscholastic sporting activities include football, volleyball, golf (boys/girls), bowling (boys/girls), cross country (boys/girls), basketball, cheer, swimming (boys/girls), soccer (boys/girls), baseball, softball and track and field (boys/girls).

Football
- The Wolves football team won state football championship in 1992 and 2008.

Volleyball
- The Lady Wolves volleyball team captured a state volleyball championship in 2007.

Bowling

Basketball

Track and Cross Country
- Head Coach: Karl Koonce – a 2009 National Coach of the Year award recipient by the National Federation of State High School Associations (NFHS) Coaches Association.
- The boys track team won three consecutive state track and field championships (2008, 2009, 2010).
- The boys cross country team won four consecutive state cross country championships (2006, 2007, 2008, 2009).
- The girls track team won state track and field championships with titles in 2007 and 2011.
- The girls cross country team are 7-time state champions with titles in 1985–87, 1990, 2006, 2011–12.

Soccer
- Head Coach: Stan Cooper
Tennis
- The Lady Wolves tennis team won the 6A class state tennis championship in 2012.

Baseball

Softball
- The Lady Wolves fastpitch softball team are 3-time state softball champions with titles in 2007, 2009 and 2012.

== Notable alumni ==
- Bruce Cozart, member of the Arkansas House of Representatives from District 24 in Garland County; former member of the LHHS School Board
- Allen McDill, Former MLB Pitcher (Kansas City Royals, Detroit Tigers, Boston Red Sox)
- Kalin Olson, Playboy playmate (August 1997 centerfold)
- Trenton Lee Stewart, Author of The Mysterious Benedict Society
- Tippi McCullough, politician
