= 2009 Pearcy murders =

Mass shooting in Arkansas, U.S.

Pearcy murders
- Location: Pearcy, Arkansas, United States
- Date: November 11 or 12, 2009 (CST UTC−06:00)
- Attack type: Mass murder, robbery, mass shooting, arson
- Weapons: .22- and .25-caliber handguns
- Deaths: 5
- Injuries: 0
- Perpetrators: Samuel Conway; Jeremy Pickney; Marvin Stringer†

The Pearcy murders took place on November 11 or 12, 2009, in Pearcy, Arkansas, United States, a small town in the center of the state right outside of Hot Springs. A total of four related people and the girlfriend of one victim were shot to death during two burglaries; four bodies were found in a mobile home belonging to victims Edward Gentry Jr. and his wife Pam. The mobile home had been burned to destroy evidence. The fifth victim, Edward Gentry Sr., was found in another structure on the property. Jeremy Pickney, Marvin Stringer and Samuel Conway, all in their early twenties, were quickly identified as suspects due to their possessing stolen goods from the Gentry trailer. Stringer was killed during a shootout in a police raid when authorities attempted to arrest him at the Red Roof Inn on East Grand Ave.

Conway was convicted at trial in June 2011 on multiple counts of capital murder and burglary, and sentenced to life in prison without parole. The Arkansas Supreme Court ordered a retrial of his case due to judicial error. He pleaded guilty and was sentenced to 40 years in prison. Pickney made a plea bargain, pleading guilty in 2011 to conspiracy to commit aggravated residential burglary, and was sentenced to 50 years in prison.

== Murders ==
In the early morning hours of November 12, 2009, firefighters were alerted to a burning mobile home in Pearcy, Arkansas, approximately 55 miles southwest of Little Rock. Upon investigation, they discovered four bodies. These were later identified as 56-year-old Edward Gentry Jr., his 52-year-old wife Pam, their 24-year-old son Jeremy, and Jeremy's 19-year-old girlfriend Kristyn Warneke. They had all been shot to death. The trailer home had been set on fire and burned so fiercely that the floor collapsed in one area. A few hours later the body of 80-year-old Edward Gentry Sr. was found in another building on the property. He had been bound and shot to death execution style, with two bullets to the head. Police determined that the victims had been burglarized: flat-screen televisions, guns, and two sets of rims and tires had been stolen.

Later reports made by ballistic experts and medical examiners revealed more details. A state medical examiner named Daniel Dye testified during the trial that Edward Gentry Jr. had been shot once in the head, Pamela Gentry had been shot at least three times, including at least once to the head, Jeremy Gentry had been shot once in the head, Kristyn Warneke had been shot twice in the head, and Edward Gentry Sr. had also been shot twice in the head.

== Investigation and arrests ==
A few hours after the bodies were discovered, the truck of one of the victims was found about thirteen miles away; it had also been burned. Three suspects, Samuel Conway, Jeremy Pickney and Marvin Stringer, were quickly identified after Conway's former girlfriend saw him with the stolen goods and contacted police. A police informant attempted to buy the televisions and rims from Conway the day after the murders and said that Conway indicated they had come from a "lick", or robbery. The informant said that Conway brandished two handguns that were later determined to have been used in the murders. The informant also purchased a .40-caliber pistol from Stringer; it was positively identified as having belonged to Edward Gentry Sr.

On November 19, police raided an inn in Hot Springs, Arkansas where they had learned the suspects were staying. Conway and Pickney, both 23 years old, were taken into custody, and Stringer, 22, was killed in a shootout with police. During the shootout Garland County Sheriff's Deputy Jason Lawrence was shot and wounded and another Deputy, Felix Hunter, had an undisclosed medical issue. Lawrence was treated at a hospital.

== Trial ==
When the case went to trial, the prosecution said that the motive for the murders was revenge over stolen property. Elder Conway brother [Ernest] had asked Samuel Conway and Pickney for help burglarizing the Gentry home.

In June 2011, Conway was found guilty of the burglary and murders and sentenced to life in prison without the possibility of parole. In October of the same year, Pickney reached a plea agreement with prosecutors, pleading guilty to lesser charges to avoid trial on capital murder. He was sentenced to a total of 50 years in prison after pleading guilty to conspiracy to commit aggravated residential burglary and theft by receiving, sentenced to 30 years for the first charge and 20 for the second.

Conway's defense attorney appealed his conviction and sentence. In November 2012, the Arkansas Supreme Court, ruled that Conway was entitled to a retrial because the judge presiding over his original trial did not dismiss a juror who said he could not be fair to Conway. In June 2016 Conway pleaded guilty to five counts of first-degree murder in return for capital charges being dropped and was sentenced to 40 years in prison for each count to be served consecutively without parole.

== Additional charges ==
While awaiting trial in 2010, Conway, his brother Detric Conway, age 35, and a woman, 23-year-old Dominic N. Hobson, were charged in the 2005 robbery and murder of 50-year-old Mary Anderson in Hot Springs. Samuel Conway was then awaiting a mental evaluation in relation to charges against him in the Pearcy murders committed in 2009. Samuel Conway was convicted of the murder of his Mary Anderson. The Gentrys and Warnekes are still awaiting the retrial for their family as of November 3, 2015. The trial was moved to January 2016, awaiting the appeal verdict of Samuel Conway for the Mary Anderson murder. If he does not win the appeal on the Anderson case he will enter a plea deal with the state on the Gentry/Warneke murders.
