= List of lakes of Garland County, Arkansas =

There are at least 30 named lakes and reservoirs in Garland County, Arkansas.One of the lakes is Lake Hamilton. Another one is lake Catherine

== Lakes ==
According to the United States Geological Survey, there are no named lakes in Garland County.

== Reservoirs ==
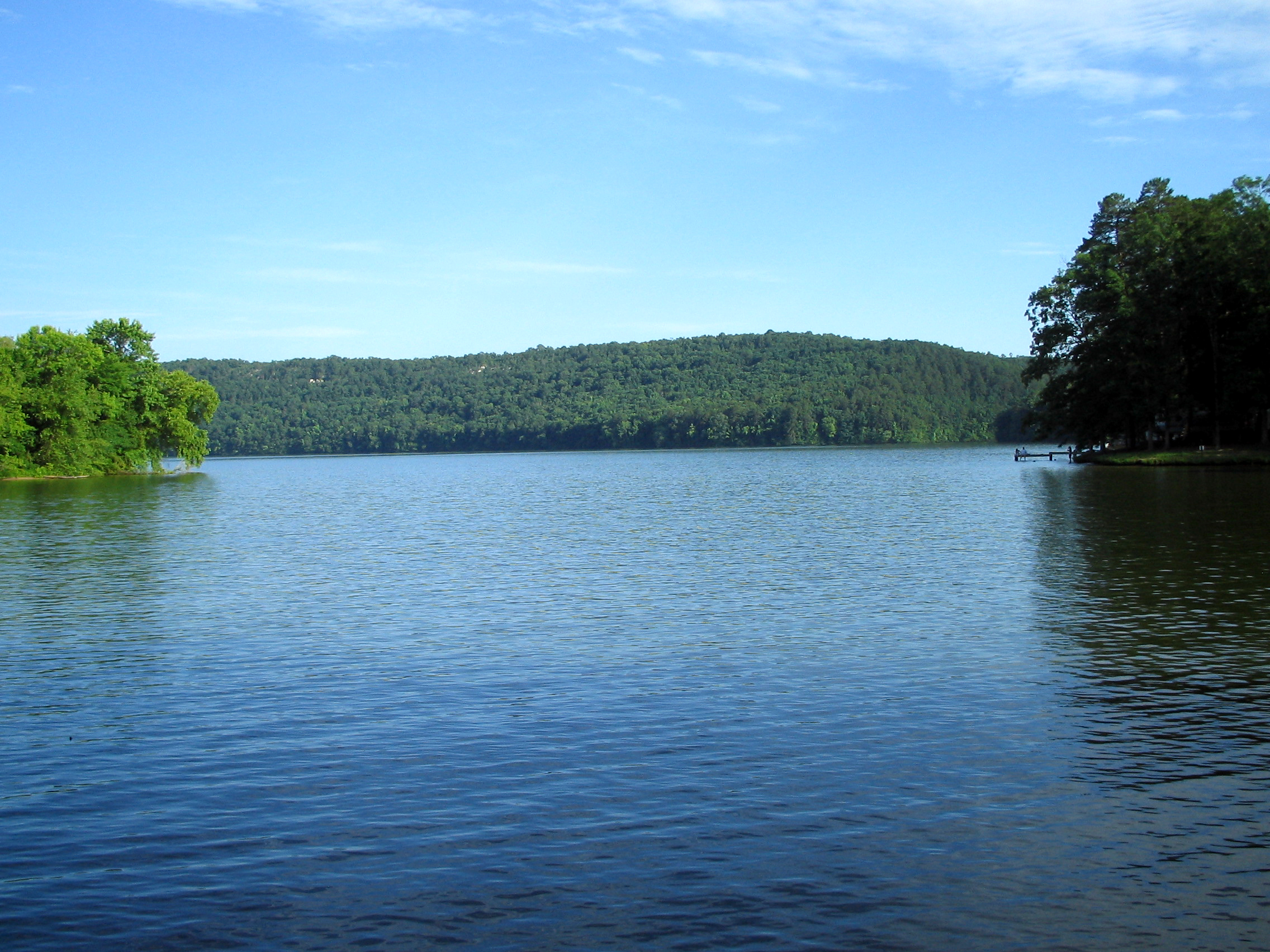
Lake Catherine

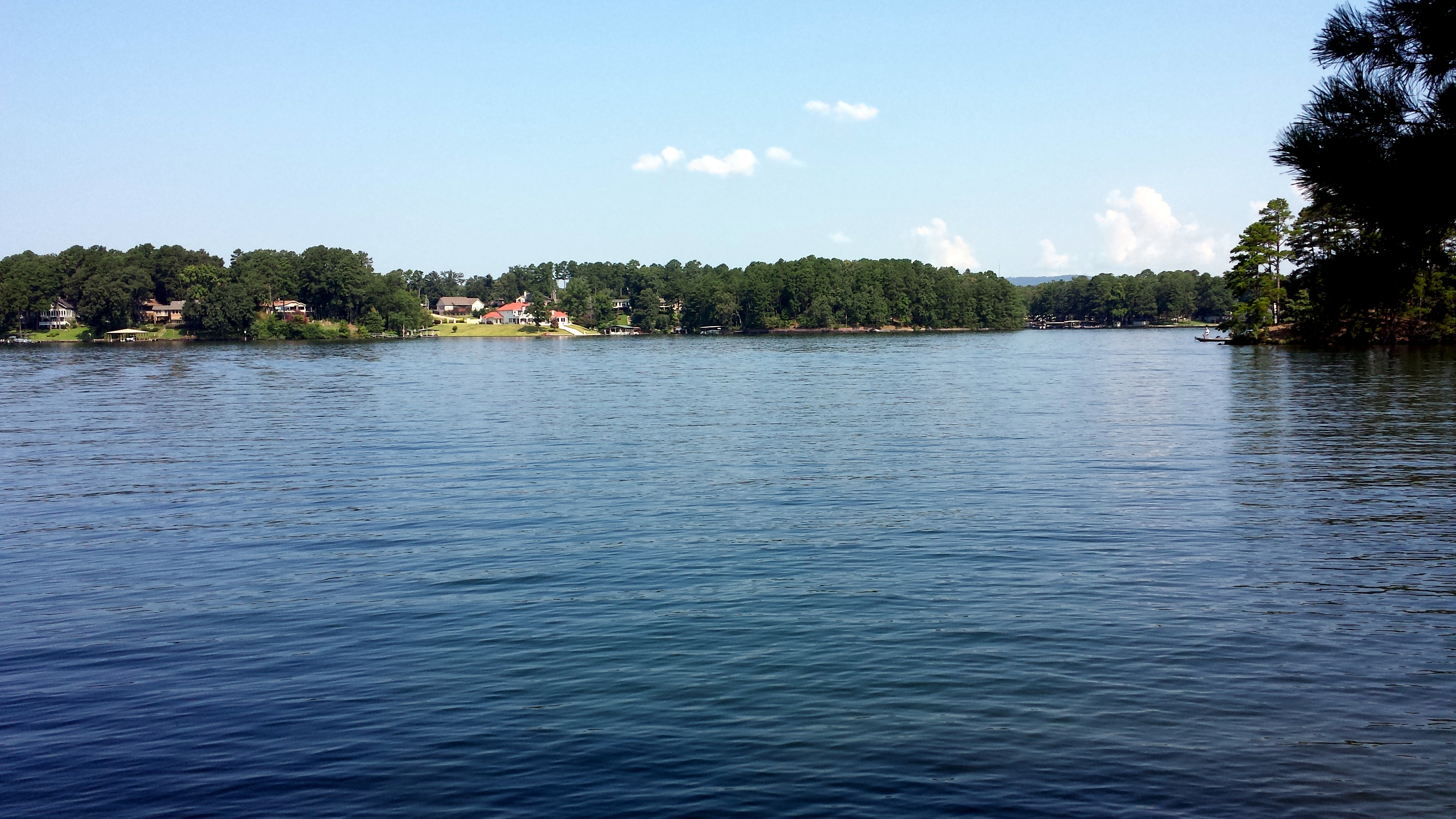
Lake Hamilton

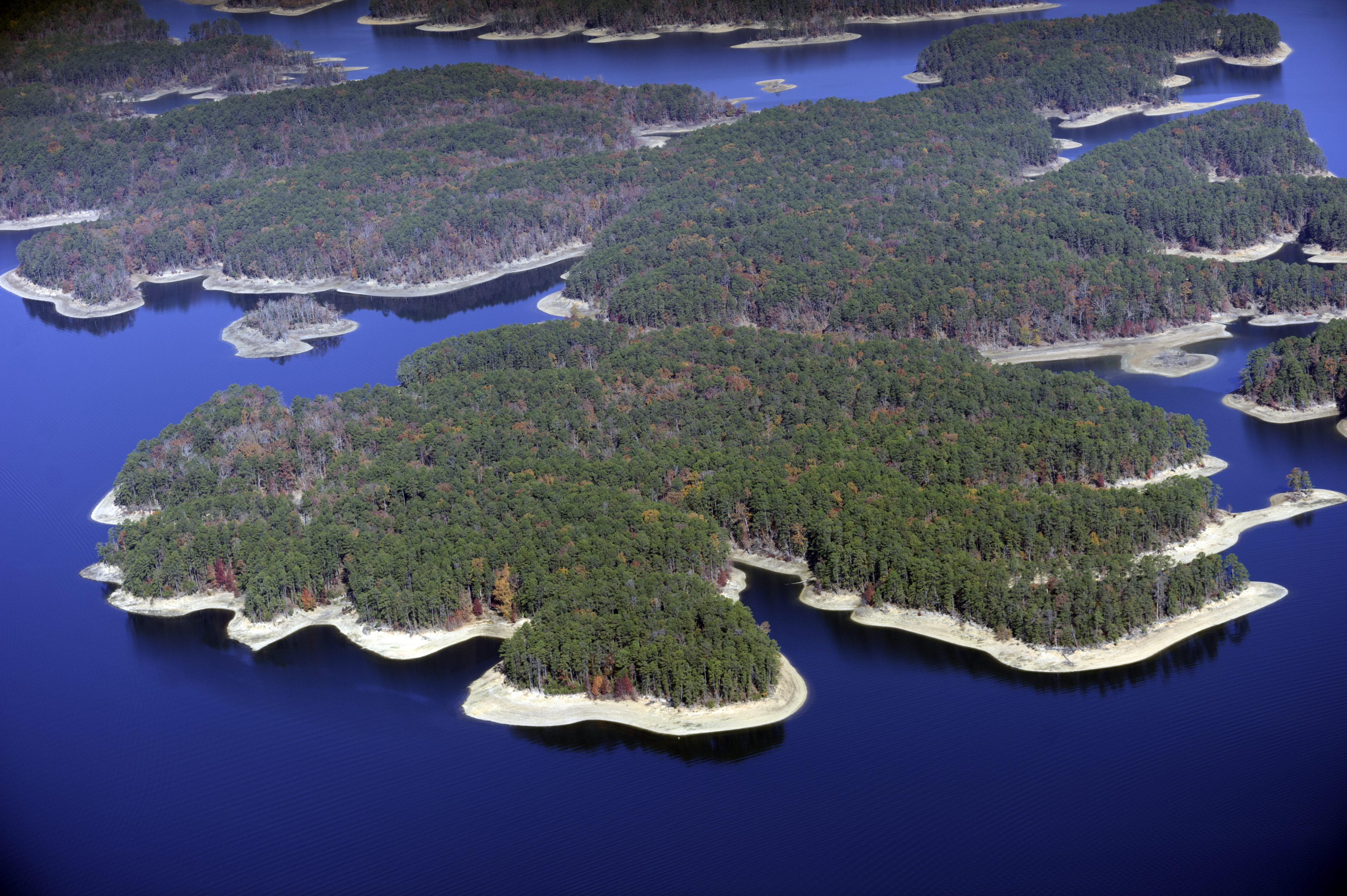
Lake Ouachita

- Arkansas Noname 136 Reservoir, 34°31′19″N 093°17′31″W, el. 653 feet (199 m)
- Bethel Lake, 34°32′21″N 093°03′52″W, el. 610 feet (190 m)
- Big Lake, 34°37′53″N 093°00′31″W, el. 751 feet (229 m)
- Camp Clear Fork Reservoir, 34°30′27″N 093°23′39″W, el. 709 feet (216 m)
- Country Club Lake, 34°32′47″N 093°00′23″W, el. 745 feet (227 m)
- Desoto Lake, 34°32′15″N 093°02′03″W, el. 604 feet (184 m)
- Dillon Lake, 34°32′37″N 093°03′35″W, el. 630 feet (190 m)
- Forest Lake, 34°33′48″N 093°00′16″W, el. 686 feet (209 m)
- Fountain Lake, 34°34′34″N 092°58′12″W, el. 574 feet (175 m)
- Hot Springs Reservoir, 34°34′23″N 093°05′36″W, el. 659 feet (201 m)
- Lake Catherine, 34°27′16″N 092°57′34″W, el. 305 feet (93 m)
- Lake Coronado, 34°39′16″N 092°57′56″W, el. 630 feet (190 m)
- Lake Cortez, 34°40′51″N 092°58′41″W, el. 636 feet (194 m)
- Lake Desoto, 34°40′41″N 093°01′05″W, el. 732 feet (223 m)
- Lake Hamilton, 34°25′54″N 093°07′32″W, el. 400 feet (120 m)
- Lake Ouachita, 34°36′23″N 093°20′52″W, el. 577 feet (176 m)
- Lake Pineda, 34°38′31″N 092°59′38″W, el. 669 feet (204 m)
- Lake Segovia, 34°40′16″N 093°02′54″W, el. 791 feet (241 m)
- Nooner Lake, 34°36′52″N 092°55′52″W, el. 518 feet (158 m)
- O'Mahoney Pond, 34°34′30″N 092°57′55″W, el. 623 feet (190 m)
- Rector Lake, 34°31′16″N 093°17′26″W, el. 650 feet (200 m)
- Reynolds Lake, 34°29′32″N 093°18′44″W, el. 591 feet (180 m)
- Ricks Lake, 34°34′00″N 093°05′37″W, el. 797 feet (243 m)
- Ricks Pond, 34°32′18″N 093°02′01″W, el. 673 feet (205 m)
- Roberts Lake, 34°27′11″N 093°13′17″W, el. 518 feet (158 m)
- Sanderson Lake, 34°33′03″N 093°03′24″W, el. 663 feet (202 m)
- Sleepy Valley Lake, 34°32′12″N 093°01′37″W, el. 889 feet (271 m)
- Sleepy Valley Lower Lake, 34°32′06″N 093°01′49″W, el. 594 feet (181 m)
- Sleepy Valley Middle Lake, 34°32′06″N 093°01′49″W, el. 594 feet (181 m)
- Spring Lake, 34°32′26″N 092°48′35″W, el. 436 feet (133 m)
- Tailings Pond, 34°28′00″N 092°56′25″W, el. 423 feet (129 m)

== See also ==
- List of lakes in Arkansas
