= Mayberry Springs =

Historic house in Arkansas, United States

- Formerly listed on the U.S. National Register of Historic Places
- Location within Arkansas Location within the United States
- Nearest city: Crystal Springs, Arkansas
- Coordinates: 34°31′1″N 93°18′6″W
- Area: 4 acres (1.6 ha)
- Built: 1895
- Built by: David Mayberry
- Architectural style: Greek Revival, Plain Traditional
- NRHP reference No.: 90001379

Significant dates
- Added to NRHP: September 5, 1990
- Removed from NRHP: May 9, 2022

Mayberry Springs is a historic traveler's accommodation and early resort on United States Route 270 near Crystal Springs, Arkansas. Located roughly midway between Hot Springs and Mount Ida, the main surviving structure is a single-story wood-frame structure with vernacular Greek Revival styling. A shed-roof porch extends across its front, ending in an enclosed room at one end. The building was probably built about 1895, but the site has a documented history as a stagecoach stop and bathhouse at least as far back as 1850. Historic archaeological remains at the site include cabin foundations and multiple wellheads.

The property was listed on the National Register of Historic Places in 1990. It was removed in 2022.

== See also ==
- National Register of Historic Places listings in Garland County, Arkansas
