= Hot Springs Intracity Transit =

Provider of mass transportation in Garland County, Arkansas

- Headquarters: 100 Broadway Terrace
- Locale: Hot Springs, Arkansas
- Service area: Garland County, Arkansas
- Service type: Bus service, paratransit
- Routes: 3
- Stations: Hot Springs station
- Fleet: 3 buses
- Annual ridership: 101,806 (2022)
- Website: Intracity Transit

Intracity Transit is the primary provider of mass transportation in Hot Springs, Arkansas, United States, with three routes serving the region. As of 2019, the system provided 168,627 rides over 15,572 annual vehicle revenue hours with 3 buses and 1 paratransit vehicles.

== History ==
Public transit in Hot Springs began in 1874, with horsecars operated by the Hot Springs Railroad Co. By 1895, the horsecars were replaced with electric streetcars, which in turn were replaced with buses in 1938. In 2021, Intracity Transit bought buses unsuitable for transit use, requiring them to be sold before ever being put into service.

== Service ==
Intracity Transit operates 3 regular weekday bus routes on a pulse system with all routes departing Hot Springs station at 10 past the hour. Routes run on hourly headways.

Hours of operation for the system are Monday through Friday from 6:10 A.M. to 8:00 P.M. and on Saturdays from 10:10 A.M. to 6:00 P.M. There is no service on Sundays. Regular fares are $1.25.

== Fixed route ridership ==
The ridership statistics shown here are of fixed route services only and do not include demand response services.

== See also ==
- List of bus transit systems in the United States
- Texarkana Urban Transit District
