= Bruce Cozart =

American politician

Member of the Arkansas House of Representatives
- Incumbent
- Assumed office March 11, 2011
- Constituency: 24th district (2011–23); 91st district (2023–present)

Personal details
- Born: October 3, 1955 (age 70) Pearcy, Arkansas, U.S.
- Party: Republican
- Children: 2
- Occupation: Businessman

Bruce Alan Cozart (born October 3, 1955) is an American politician and businessman who has been a Republican member of the Arkansas House of Representatives since 2011.

== Early life and education ==
Cozart was born on October 3, 1955. Cozart graduated from Lake Hamilton High School in 1973.

== Early career ==
Cozart founded Bruce Cozart Construction, Inc. in 1977. He is a general contractor for commercial and residential buildings. Cozart served on the Lake Hamilton school board from 1991 to 2001.

== Political career ==
=== 2011 election ===
Cozart won a special election against Jerry Raphon on March 8, 2011.

=== 2011-12 Legislature ===
During the 2011-12 Legislature Cozart served on the following committees:

- Aging, Children and Youth, Legislative and Military Affairs
- Public Transportation

=== 2012 election ===
Cozart won re-election 7,778 votes to 4,624 against Jimmie Harmon.

=== 2013-14 Legislature ===
During the 2013-14 Legislature Cozart served on the following committees:

- Joint Energy
- Education
- City, County and Local Affairs

=== 2014 election ===
Cozart ran unopposed in the 2014 election.

=== 2015-16 Legislature ===
During the 2015-16 Legislature Cozart served on the following committees:

- Education, Chairman
- Insurance and Commerce
- Legislative Joint Auditing

=== 2016 election ===
Cozart ran unopposed in the 2016 election.

=== 2017-18 Legislature ===
During the 2017-18 Legislature Cozart served on the Following committees:

- Agriculture, Forestry and Economic Development
- Education, Chairman

=== 2018 election ===
Cozart won re-election 6,460 votes to Kallen Peret's 2,913.

=== 2019-20 Legislature ===
During the 2019-20 Legislature Cozart served on the Following committees:

- Academic Facilities Oversight Committee, Co-chairman
- Legislative Council
- House Education Committee
- House State Agencies and Governmental Affairs Committee

In February 2019, Cozart sponsored a bill that would raise minimum teacher salaries across the state of Arkansas. The bill was passed by the Arkansas House of Representatives. There were funding concerns about the bill before it passed.

=== 2020 election ===
Cozart ran unopposed in the 2020 election.

=== 2021-22 Legislature ===
During the 2021-22 Legislature Cozart serves on the Following committees:

- House Education Committee, Chairman
- House State Agencies and Governmental Affairs Committee
- Joint Performance Review Committee
- Legislative Council

In February 2021, Cozart sponsored a bill that would allow parents to challenge curriculum they did not like. It came less than a day after a failure of a bill that banned the 1619 Project from being used in schools. The bill passed and became law. Cozart, alongside Missy Irvin in the Arkansas Senate, helped get another teacher pay increase bill passed in both the Arkansas House and Senate in April 2021. The bill would aim to increase median teacher salaries across the board. Governor Asa Hutchinson signed the bills on April 12, 2021.

== Personal life ==
Cozart is married and has two sons. Cozart is a follower of the Assembly of God faith.
