= Lake Hamilton School District =

School district in Arkansas, United States

Address
- 205 Wolf Street Pearcy, Arkansas, 71964; United States

District information
- Type: Public
- Grades: PreK–12
- NCES District ID: 0508610

Students and staff
- Students: 4,342 (As of 2010 Census)
- Teachers: 249.83 (As of 2010 Census)
- Staff: 251.5 (As of 2010 Census)
- Student–teacher ratio: 17.38 (As of 2010 Census)

Other information
- Website: www.lhwolves.net

Lake Hamilton School District 5 is a school district located in Garland County, Arkansas.

It includes Crystal Springs, Pearcy, Rockwell, and much of Piney. A very small portion of Hot Springs extends into this district, however, the district does not include the census-designated place of Lake Hamilton.

== Schools ==
The District includes:

- Lake Hamilton Primary School
- Lake Hamilton Elementary School
- Lake Hamilton Intermediate School
- Lake Hamilton Middle School
- Lake Hamilton Junior High
- Lake Hamilton High School
