= Flavius Josephus Carpenter =

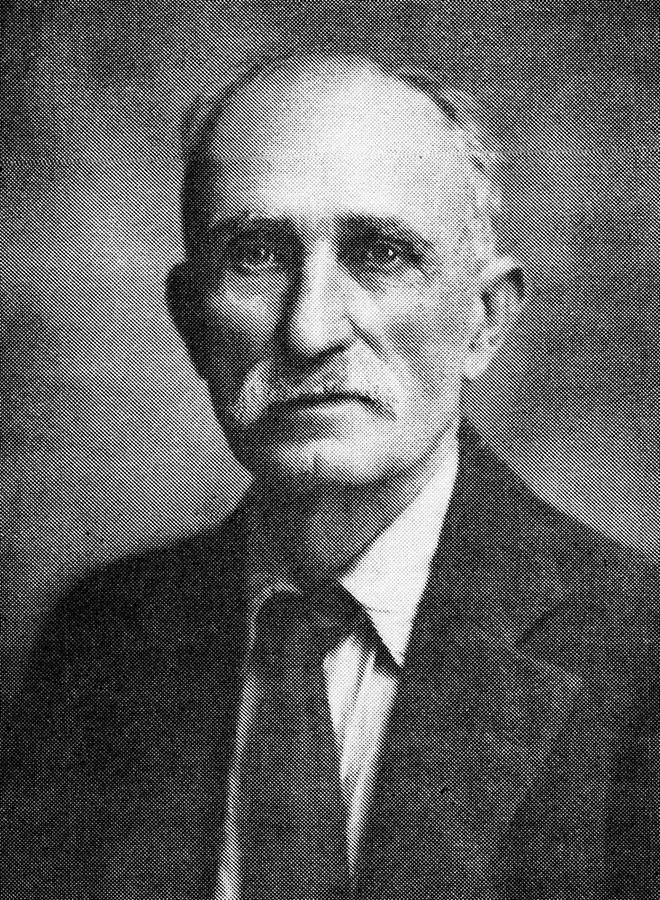
- Carpenter c. 1930
- Born: March 24, 1851; Franklin County, Georgia, U.S.
- Died: August 2, 1933 (aged 82); Arkadelphia, Arkansas, U.S.

Flavius Josephus Carpenter (March 24, 1851 – August 2, 1933) was an American businessman from Arkansas. He is best known for selecting the locations of two hydroelectric dams for Arkansas Power & Light on the Ouachita River, forming Lake Hamilton and Lake Catherine. He was also an American Civil War veteran, steamboat captain, and deputy United States marshal.

== Early life ==
He married on June 2, 1877, in Clark County, Arkansas, to Jane Elizabeth Wallis, who was born in August 1857 in Missouri; they were the parents of eight children.
