= Bear, Arkansas =

Unincorporated community in Arkansas, US

Coordinates: 34°32′04″N 93°16′26″W

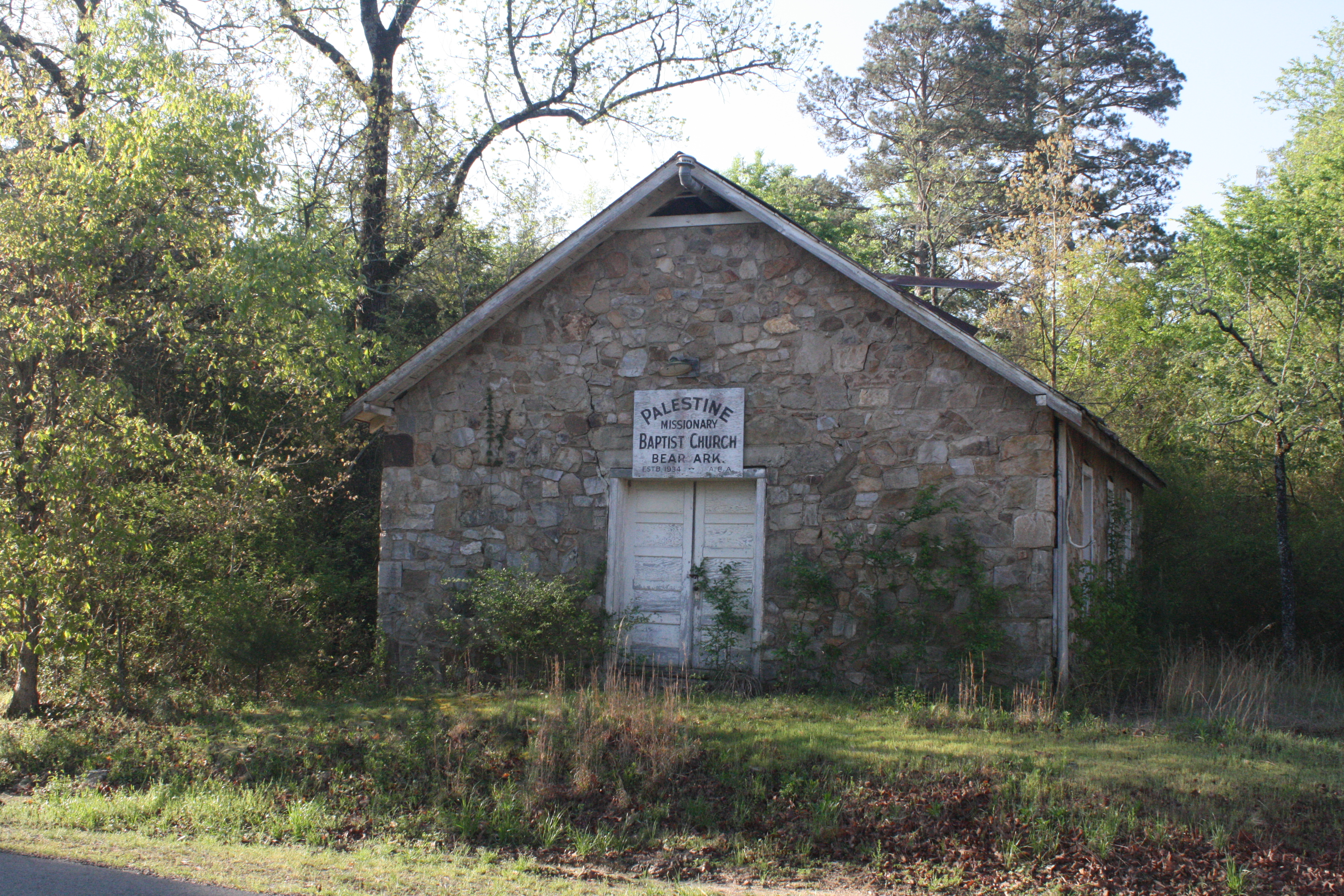
Palestine Missionary Baptist Church in Bear

Bear, formerly also called Bear City, is an unincorporated community in Garland County, Arkansas, United States. It is close to the shore of Lake Ouachita, which was formed by the construction of the Blakely Mountain Dam across the Ouachita River. Today, Bear has very few inhabitants and is surrounded by the Ouachita National Forest.

== History ==
Up until some point in the early 20th century after 1910 Bear was in Montgomery County. However, it was decided to make the boundary more regular so Bear as well as Buckville and Cedar Glades were transferred to Garland County.

Bear City began with the founding of a post office in 1882. The area only had a few homesteaders and was named for nearby Bear Mountain. In 1884, rumors of gold in the area began to circulate. The first plat for the city was also filed that year. By 1887, there were 35 mining companies in Bear City, as well as two newspapers, the Bear City Times and the Arkansas Mining Journal. The city had between 1,200 and 5,000 people.

Unfortunately for Bear City, the gold mining companies were built on false hopes and scams. When Geological Survey of Arkansas geologist John Casper Branner exposed the gold scams, the citizens of Bear City burned him in effigy. However, this burst the bubble of false speculation and most people moved away.

Bear remained a small community. A school was built there in 1906. Starting in 1930 there was a chair factory that employed 12 people. Sometime in the 1940s, the school was consolidated into the Lake Hamilton School District.

== Sources ==
- Encyclopedia of Arkansas entry on Bear
- The Farm Journal Complete World Atlas, 1912 Edition, p. 14
- Haymond's Complete World Atlas, 1952 Edition, p. 160
