= Rockwell, Arkansas =

- CDP
- Location in Garland County and the state of Arkansas
- Coordinates: 34°27′32″N 93°07′45″W
- Country: United States
- State: Arkansas
- County: Garland

Area
  - Total: 4.33 sq mi (11.21 km^{2})
  - Land: 3.27 sq mi (8.48 km^{2})
  - Water: 1.06 sq mi (2.74 km^{2})
- Elevation: 446 ft (136 m)

Population (2020)
  - Total: 4,548
  - Density: 1,390/sq mi (536.6/km^{2})
- Time zone: UTC-6 (Central (CST))
  - Summer (DST): UTC-5 (CDT)
- ZIP code: 71913
- Area code: 501
- FIPS code: 05-60110
- GNIS feature ID: 2403489

Rockwell is a census-designated place (CDP) in Garland County, Arkansas, United States. As of the 2020 census, Rockwell had a population of 4,548.

== Geography ==
According to the United States Census Bureau, the CDP has a total area of 4.2 square miles (11 km^{2}), of which 3.1 square miles (8.0 km^{2}) is land and 1.1 square miles (2.8 km^{2}) (25.17%) is water.

== Demographics ==
Historical population
Census	Pop.	Note	%±
2020	4,548		—
U.S. Decennial Census

=== 2020 census ===
As of the 2020 census, Rockwell had a population of 4,548. The median age was 42.5 years. 22.6% of residents were under the age of 18 and 21.9% of residents were 65 years of age or older. For every 100 females there were 90.9 males, and for every 100 females age 18 and over there were 90.4 males age 18 and over.

100.0% of residents lived in urban areas, while 0.0% lived in rural areas.

There were 1,863 households in Rockwell, of which 31.4% had children under the age of 18 living in them. Of all households, 51.3% were married-couple households, 14.0% were households with a male householder and no spouse or partner present, and 27.4% were households with a female householder and no spouse or partner present. About 24.4% of all households were made up of individuals and 12.5% had someone living alone who was 65 years of age or older. There were 1,287 families residing in the CDP.

There were 2,246 housing units, of which 17.1% were vacant. The homeowner vacancy rate was 4.9% and the rental vacancy rate was 5.5%.

Rockwell racial composition
Race	Number	Percentage
White (non-Hispanic)	3,789	83.31%
Black or African American (non-Hispanic)	218	4.79%
Native American	20	0.44%
Asian	62	1.36%
Pacific Islander	2	0.04%
Other/Mixed	245	5.39%
Hispanic or Latino	212	4.66%

=== 2000 census ===
As of the census of 2000, there were 3,024 people, 1,274 households, and 931 families residing in the CDP. The population density was 956.4 inhabitants per square mile (369.3/km^{2}). There were 1,549 housing units at an average density of 489.9 per square mile (189.2/km^{2}). The racial makeup of the CDP was 97.12% White, 0.83% Black or African American, 0.40% Native American, 0.26% Asian, 0.13% from other races, and 1.26% from two or more races. 0.86% of the population were Hispanic or Latino of any race.

There were 1,274 households, out of which 27.1% had children under the age of 18 living with them, 61.7% were married couples living together, 8.6% had a female householder with no husband present, and 26.9% were non-families. 23.2% of all households were made up of individuals, and 10.6% had someone living alone who was 65 years of age or older. The average household size was 2.37 and the average family size was 2.77.

In the CDP, the population was spread out, with 21.2% under the age of 18, 5.0% from 18 to 24, 26.4% from 25 to 44, 28.9% from 45 to 64, and 18.4% who were 65 years of age or older. The median age was 43 years. For every 100 females, there were 94.8 males. For every 100 females age 18 and over, there were 90.9 males.

The median income for a household in the CDP was $46,366, and the median income for a family was $53,241. Males had a median income of $39,175 versus $30,035 for females. The per capita income for the CDP was $24,647. About 2.7% of families and 4.5% of the population were below the poverty line, including 5.6% of those under age 18 and 1.4% of those age 65 or over.

== Education ==
It is in the Lake Hamilton School District.
