= Hot Springs station =

- Missouri-Pacific Railroad Depot-Hot Springs
- U.S. National Register of Historic Places
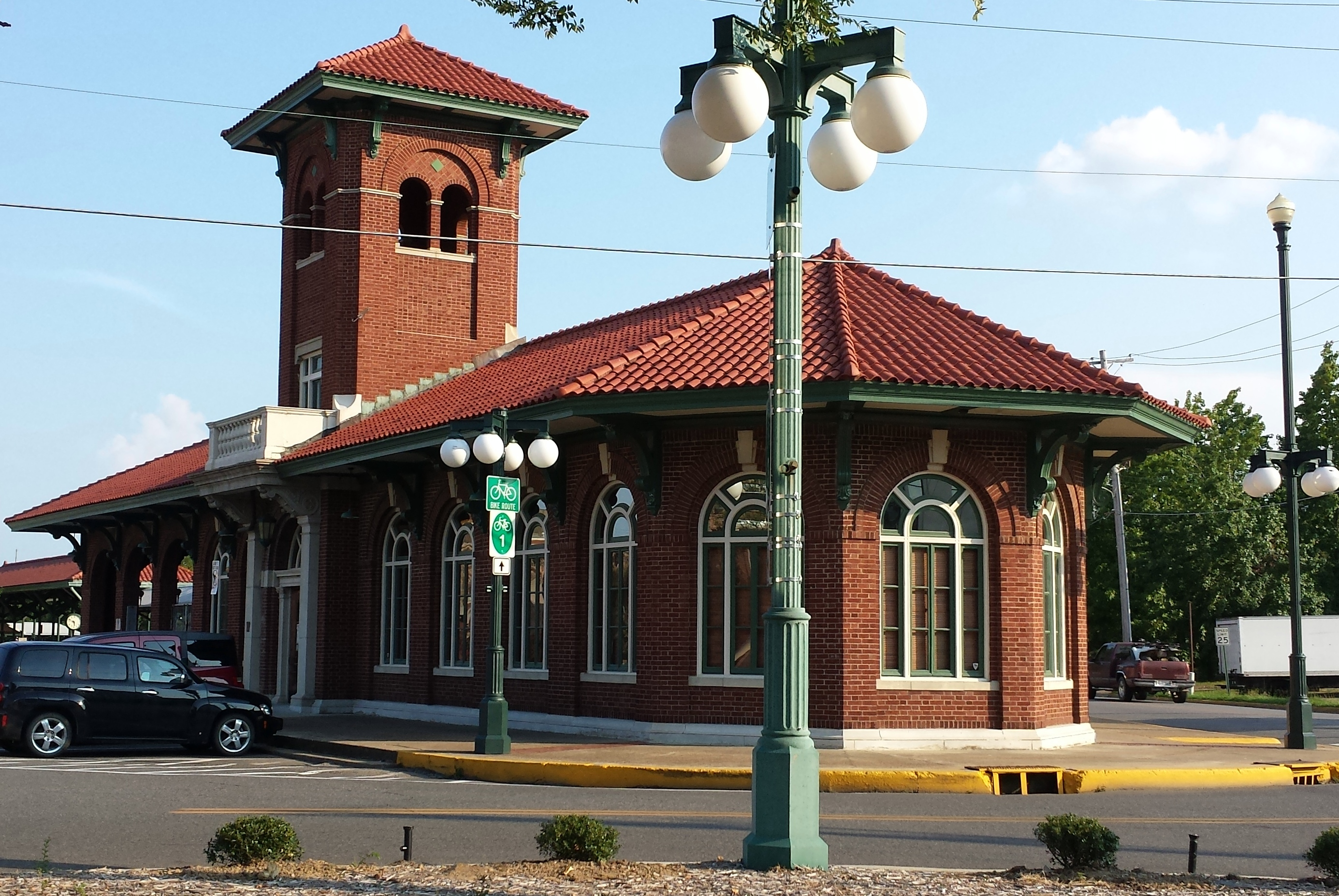

- Location within Arkansas Location within the United States
- Location: Jct. of Broadway and Market St., Hot Springs, Arkansas
- Coordinates: 34°30′27″N 93°3′9″W
- Area: less than one acre
- Built: 1917
- Built by: Missouri-Pacific Railroad
- Architectural style: Late 19th and 20th Century Revivals, Italianate, Mediterranean
- MPS: Historic Railroad Depots of Arkansas MPS
- NRHP reference No.: 92000611
- Added to NRHP: June 11, 1992

The Missouri-Pacific Railroad Depot-Hot Springs is a historic former railroad station at Broadway and Market Street in Hot Springs, Arkansas. It is a single-story masonry structure, roughly V-shaped due to the triangular parcel, with a tile hip roof with broad eaves supported by Italianate wooden brackets. A Tuscan tower rises above the station, and its walls consist of bays of compound round-arch windows. The station was built c. 1917 by the Missouri-Pacific Railroad, and is a major reminder of the importance of the railroad to the growth and success of Hot Springs as a resort community.

The station served as the main gateway for visitors who connected to the national rail network at nearby Malvern, Arkansas. Passengers changed trains at the St. Louis, Missouri to Texas mainline station at Malvern for the approximately 20 miles trip to Hot Springs along a spur line which terminated at the station. This route entered/exited downtown Hot Springs from the northeast along what is today's Convention Boulevard, then named Benton, before turning east-southeast after circling the nearby ridges much as Business US 70 follows presently.

It is now used as the transportation hub for Hot Springs Intracity Transit, as well as a Greyhound Bus Station.

The building was listed on the National Register of Historic Places in 1992.

== See also ==
- National Register of Historic Places listings in Garland County, Arkansas
