= Sunshine, Garland County, Arkansas =

Sunshine, Arkansas
- Unincorporated community
- Location within Arkansas Location within the United States
- Coordinates: 34°28′28″N 93°14′10″W
- Country: United States
- State: Arkansas
- County: Garland
- Elevation: 463 ft (141 m)
- Time zone: UTC-6 (Central (CST))
  - Summer (DST): UTC-5 (CDT)
- GNIS feature ID: 73786

Sunshine is an unincorporated community in Garland County, Arkansas, United States. On April 25, 2011, high winds – possibly a tornado – part of the storm system associated with the 2011 Super Outbreak hit the Sunshine area, destroying houses and trapping and injuring two people.
