= Lake Hamilton and Lake Catherine =

Man-made lakes in Arkansas, U.S.

Lake Hamilton
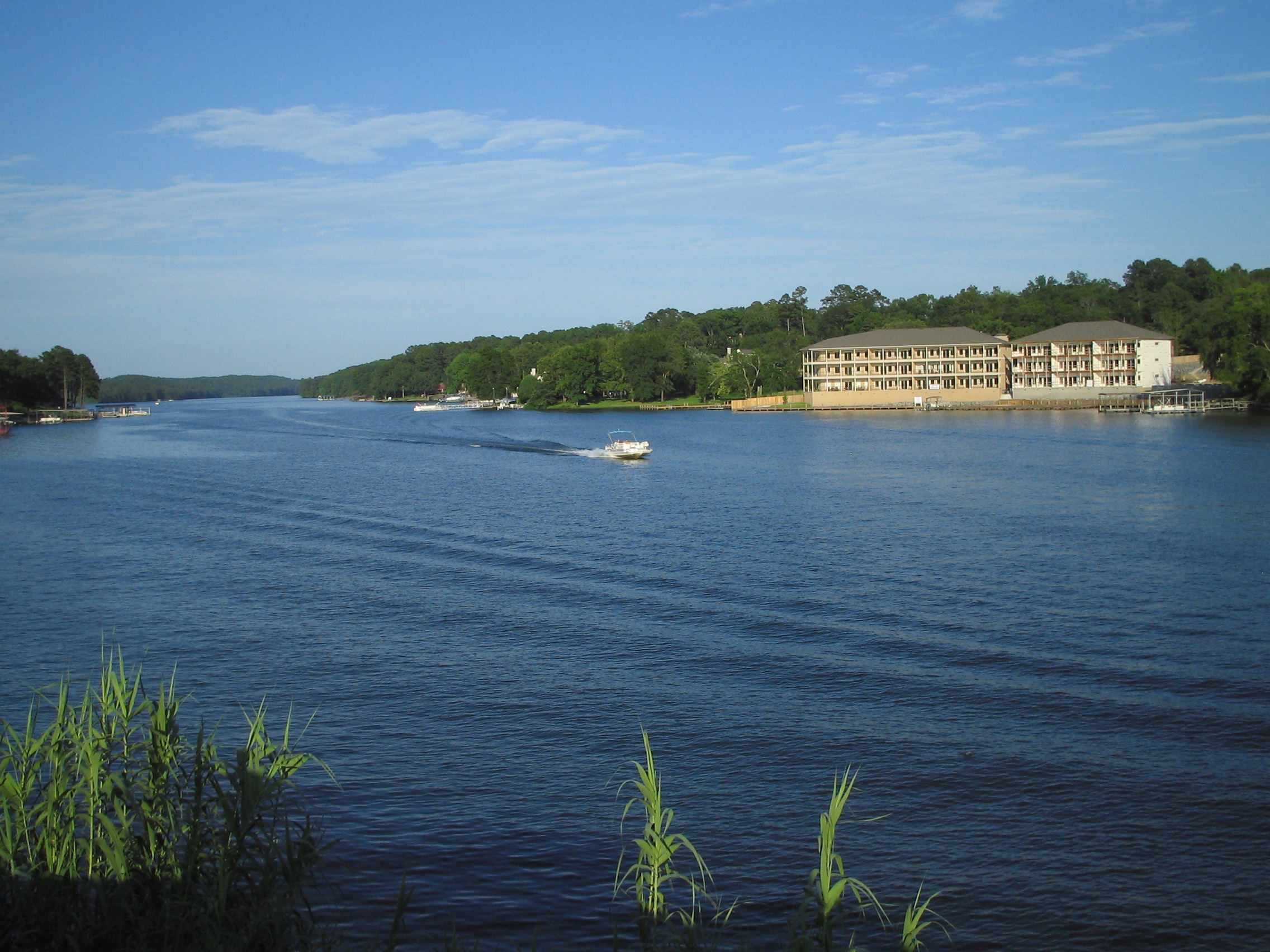

- Location within Arkansas
- Location: Garland County, Arkansas, United States
- Coordinates: 34.4325°N 93.0887°W
- Type: reservoir
- Primary inflows: Ouachita River
- Primary outflows: Ouachita River
- Basin countries: United States
- Surface area: 7,200 acres (2,900 ha)
- Carpenter Dam
- U.S. National Register of Historic Places
- Nearest city: Hot Springs, Arkansas
- Coordinates: 34°26′32″N 93°01′33″W
- Area: 7,200 acres (2,900 ha)
- Built: 1931
- Built by: Ford, Bacon, & Davis Co.
- Engineer: Ford, Bacon, & Davis Co.
- Architectural style: Solid, concrete gravity dam
- NRHP reference No.: 92001083
- Added to NRHP: September 4, 1992

Lake Hamilton and Lake Catherine are a pair of man-made lakes located in Hot Springs, Arkansas, serving as a tourist attraction for the area. Both lakes were developed by Arkansas Power & Light. The lakes were built as part of Federal Project #271 a hydroelectric development for creating hydroelectric dams.

Lake Catherine
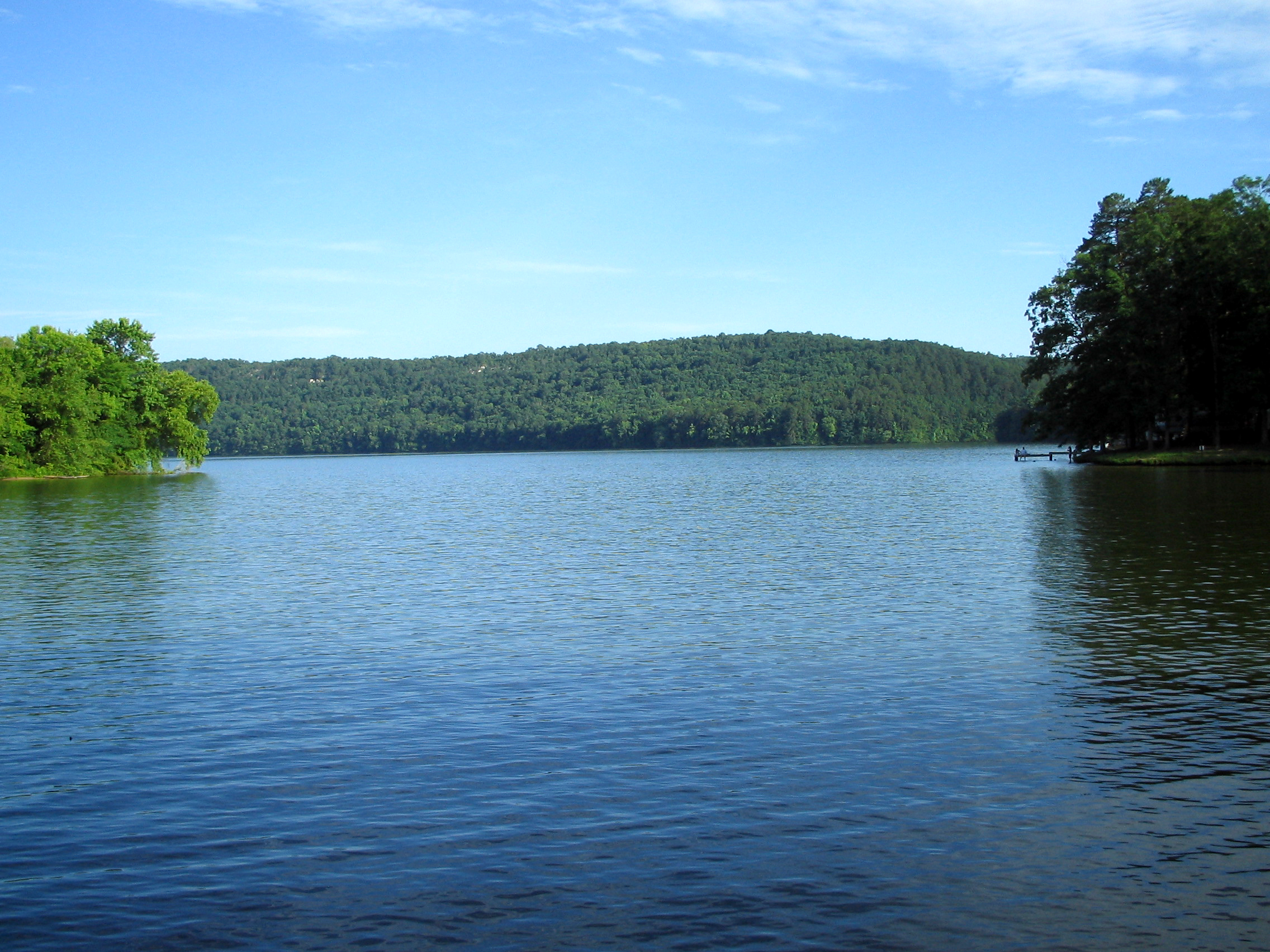

- Location within Arkansas
- Location: Garland / Hot Spring counties, Arkansas, United States
- Coordinates: 34.4442°N 92.9134°W
- Basin countries: United States
- Surface area: 1,940 acres (790 ha)
- yes
- Remmel Dam
- U.S. National Register of Historic Places
- Nearest city: Jones Mill, Arkansas
- Coordinates: 34°25′37″N 92°53′38″W
- Area: 2 acres (0.81 ha)
- Built: 1924
- Built by: Ford, Bacon, & Davis Co., Ambursen Construction Co.
- Engineer: Ford, Bacon, & Davis Co., Ambursen Construction Co.
- Architectural style: Flat-slab buttress
- NRHP reference No.: 92001084
- Added to NRHP: September 4, 1992

== History ==
=== Lake Hamilton ===
Lake Hamilton is a 7,200-acre (2,900 ha) reservoir near Lake Hamilton, Arkansas and Hot Springs, Arkansas, located on the Ouachita River. It was named after Hamilton Moses, who later became president and chairman of the board for Arkansas Power and Light. The lake was created in 1932, formed as a result of Carpenter Dam (after Flavius Josephus Carpenter) which was constructed to generate hydroelectric power. The dam, which extends in a length of 1,000 feet (300 m) and a height of 100 feet (30 m) high, was completed a year earlier in 1931. The lake subsequently functioned as a recreational site after attracting tourists, later spurring the development of resorts, restaurants, motels, and water sport facilities in its area. The Garvan Woodland Gardens, a 210-acre (85 ha) botanical park is located along its shore. Carpenter Dam was later listed on the National Register of Historic Places in 1992.

=== Lake Catherine ===
Lake Catherine is the smaller of the two lakes, sized at 1,940-acre (790 ha). The Lake Catherine State Park is located on the lake's shore. The lake was created in the 1920's with the building of Remmel Dam, a concrete-and-steel Ambursen-type buttressed dam. Remmel Dam was created to provide hydroelectricity, but the lake later developed into a recreational site as a result of lake's location next to Hot Springs.

Lake Catherine is named after Harvey Couch's daughter, Catherine, the creator of the lake.

== Gallery ==
=== Lake Hamilton ===
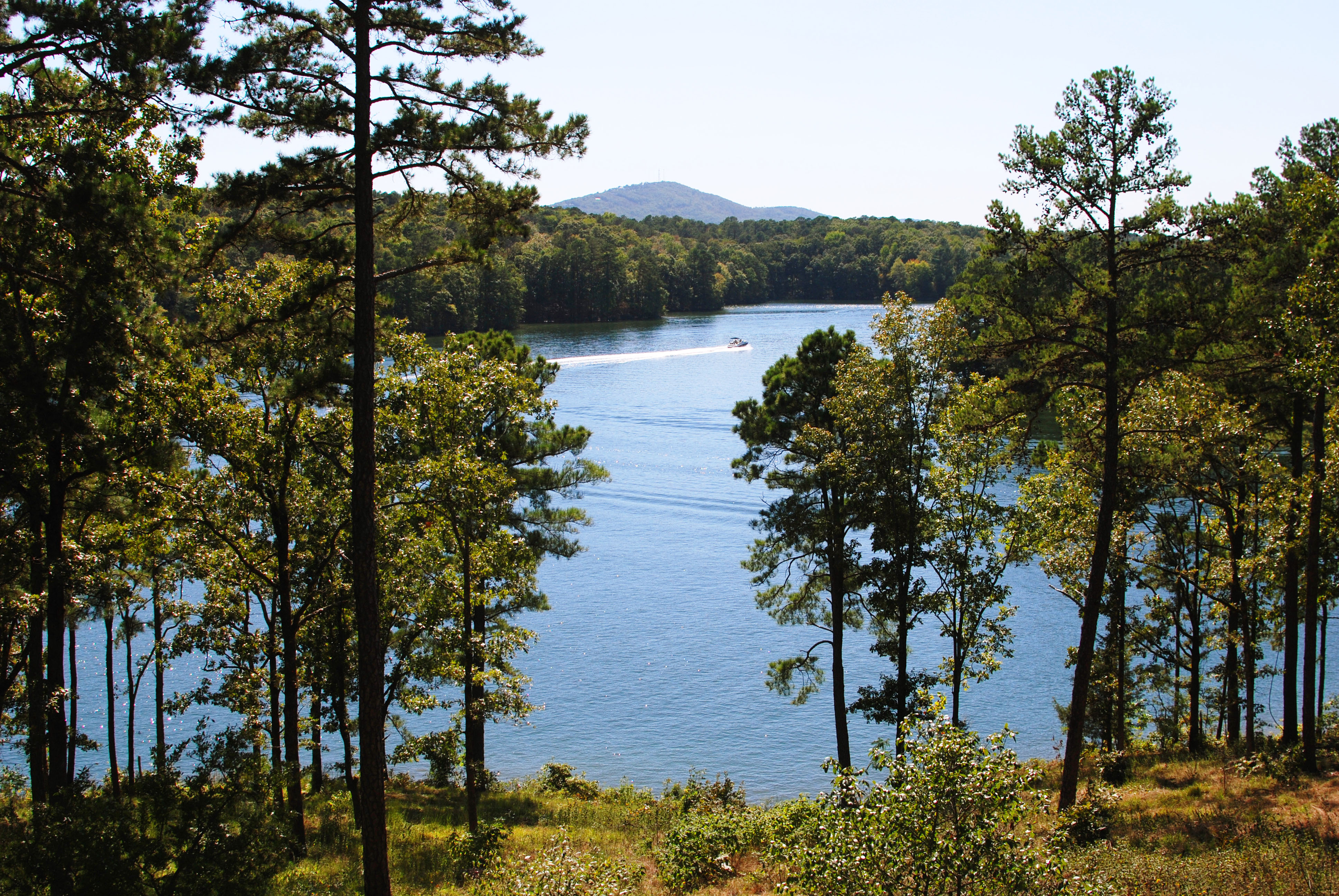
Lake Hamilton viewed from Garvan Woodland Gardens property

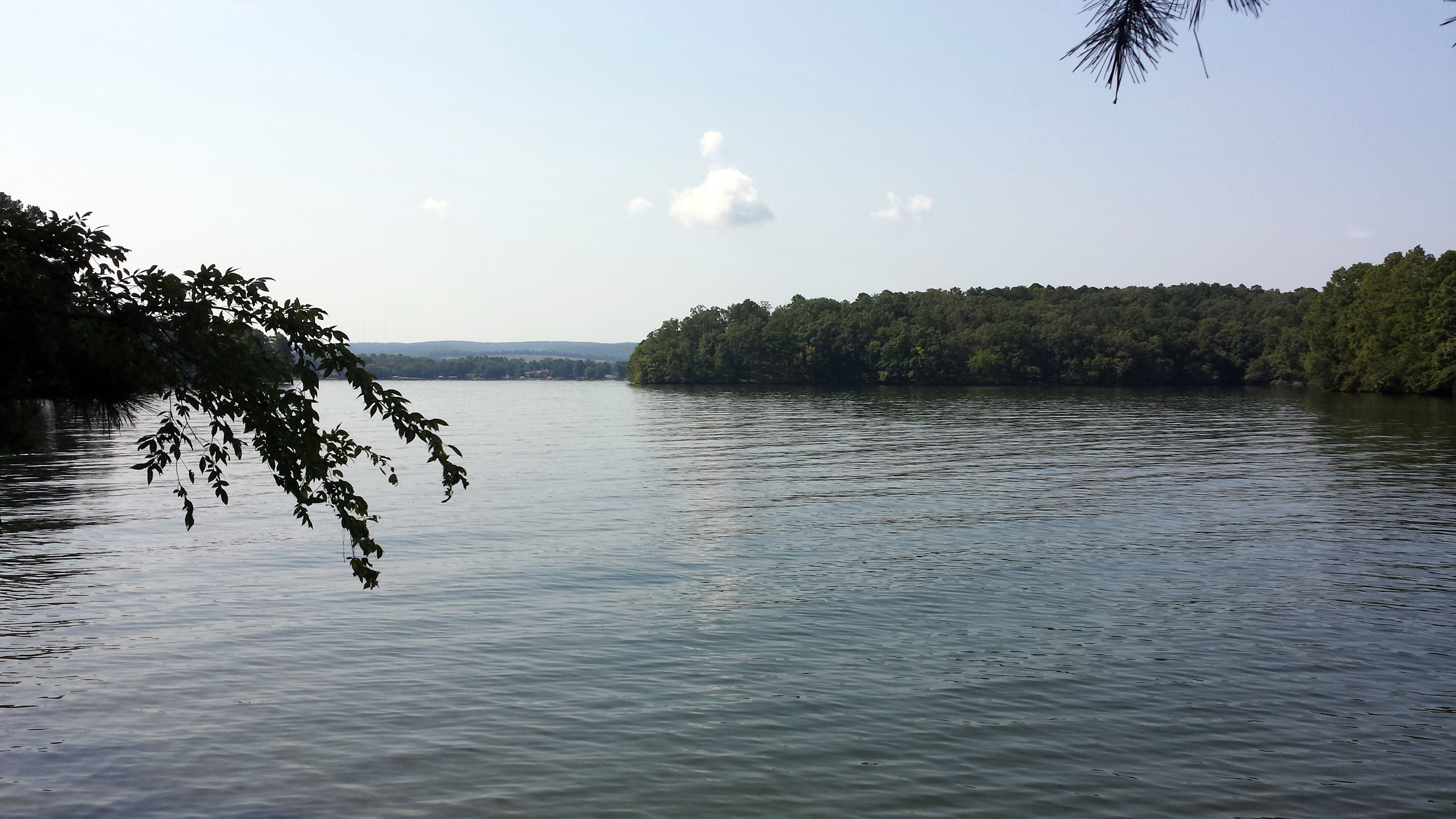
Lake Hamilton

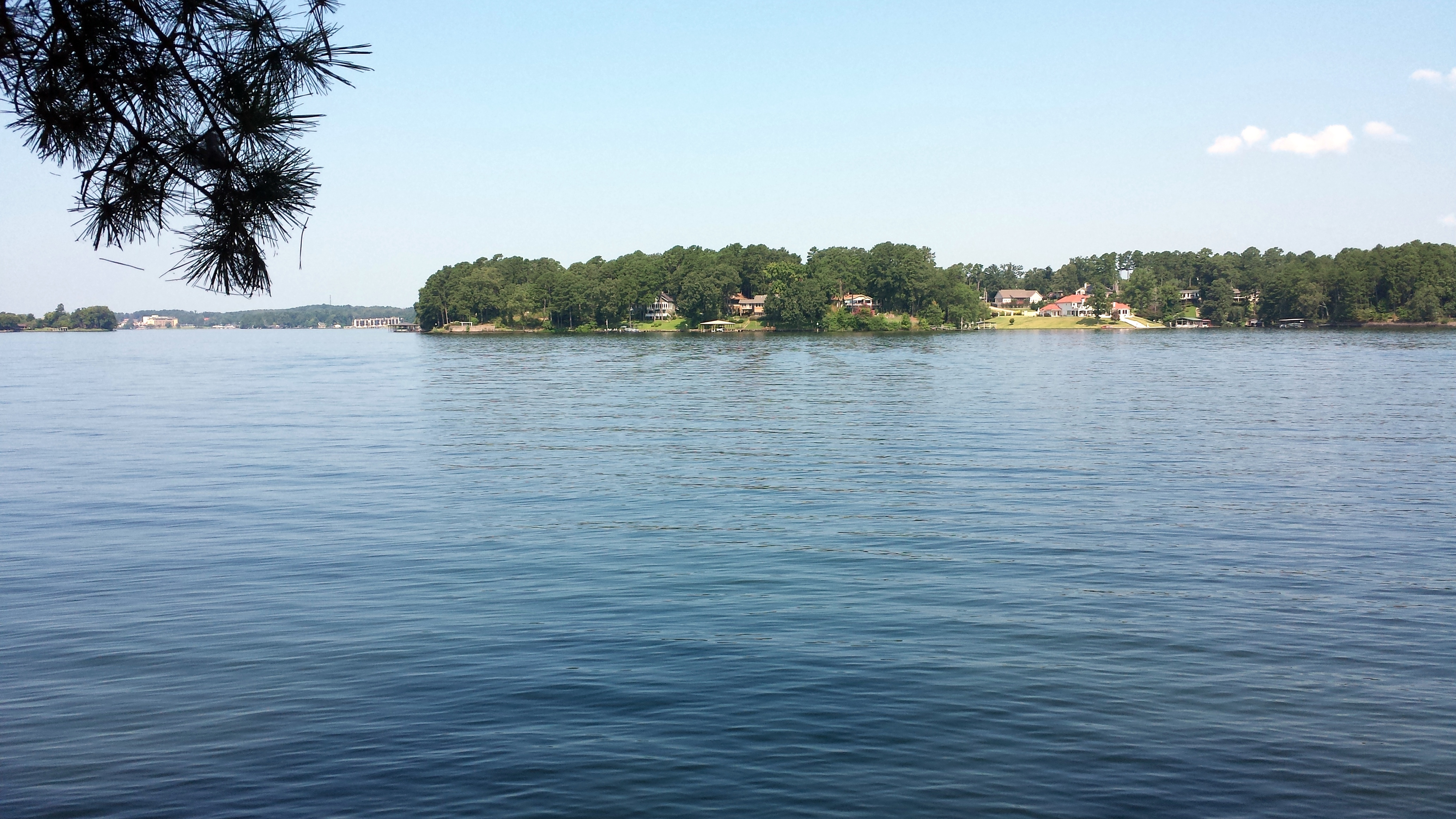
Lake Hamilton

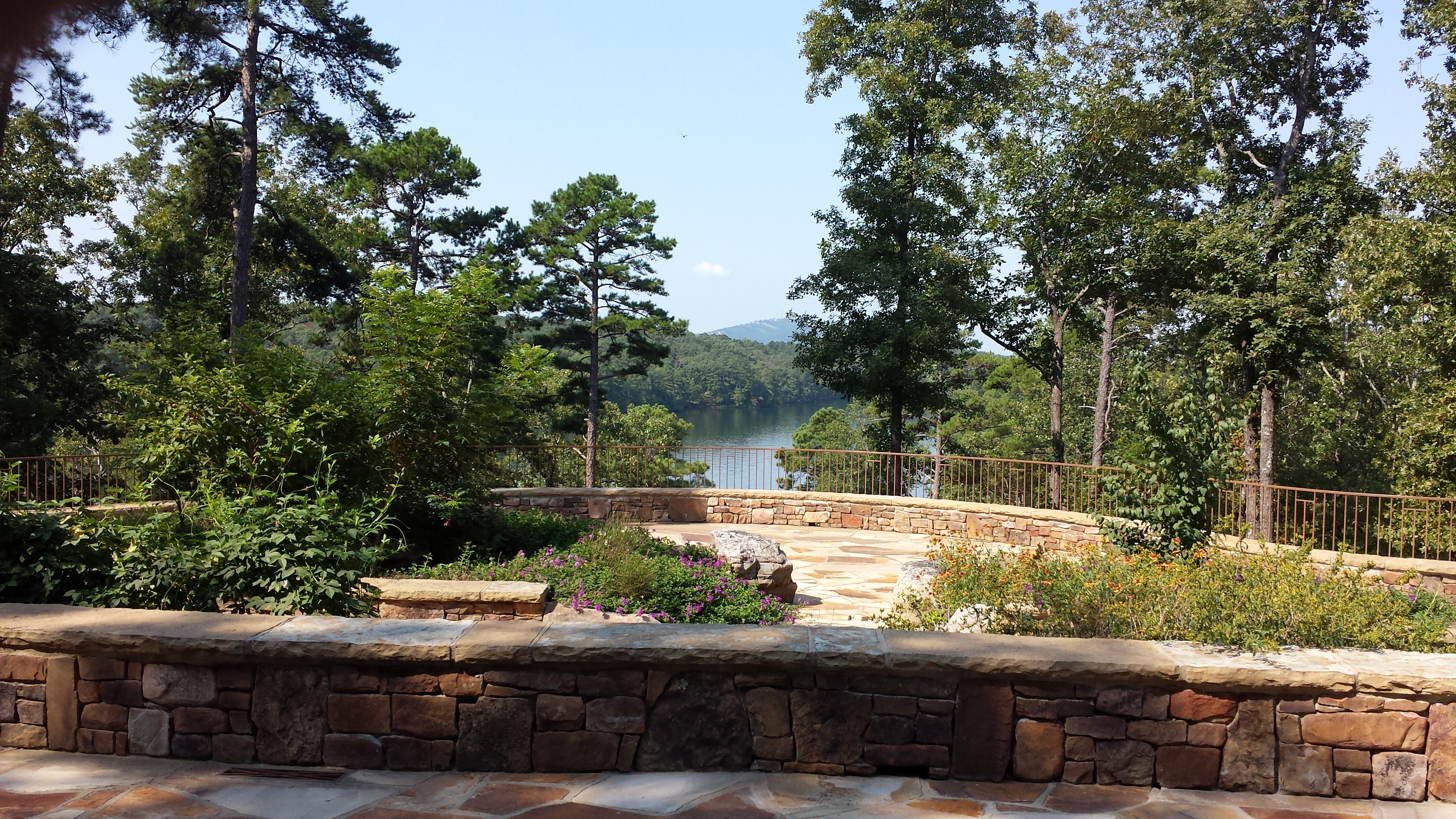
Garvan Woodlands Gardens by Lake Hamilton

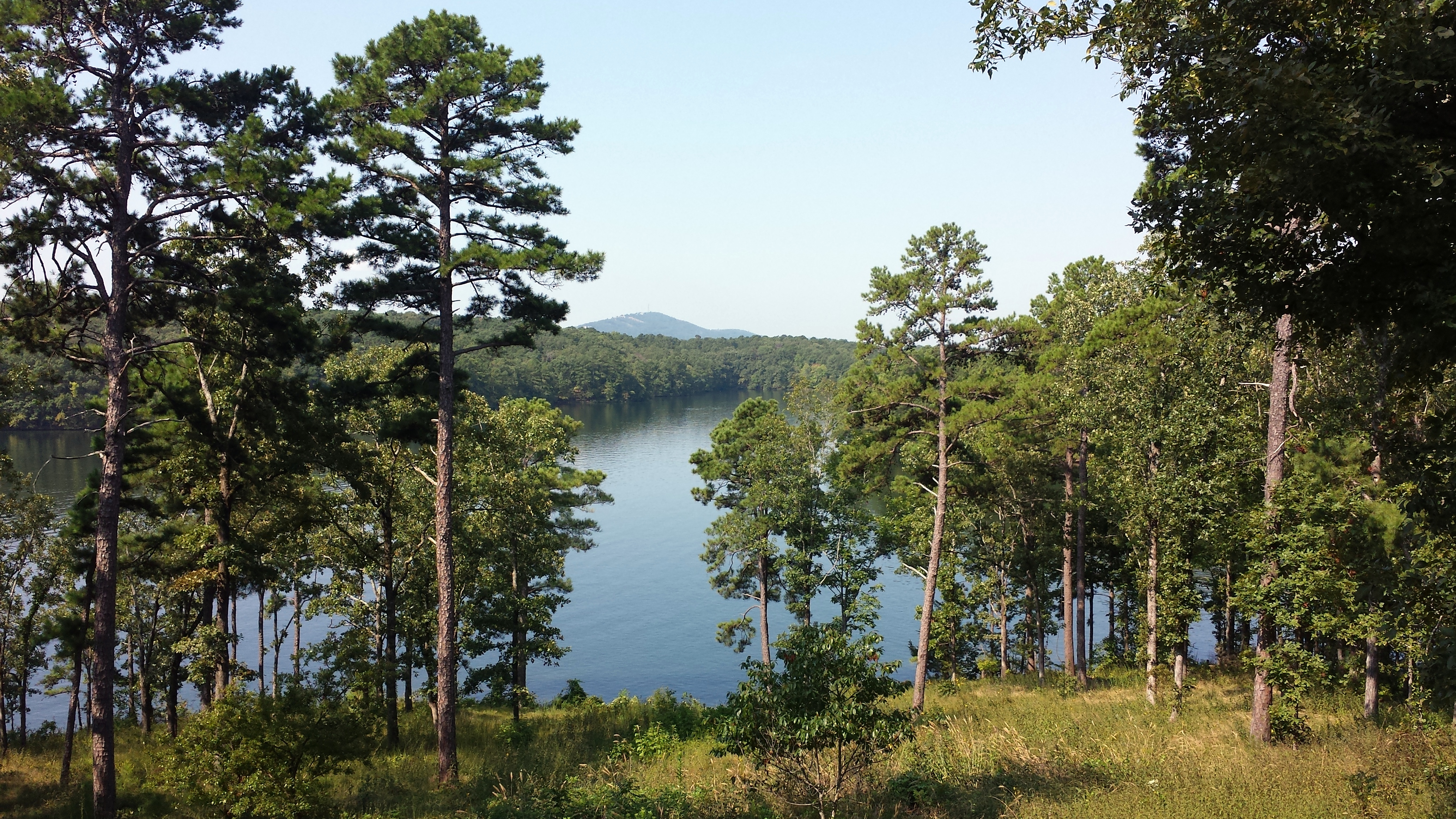
Garvan Woodlands Gardens by Lake Hamilton

=== Lake Catherine ===
Regional map over Hot Springs

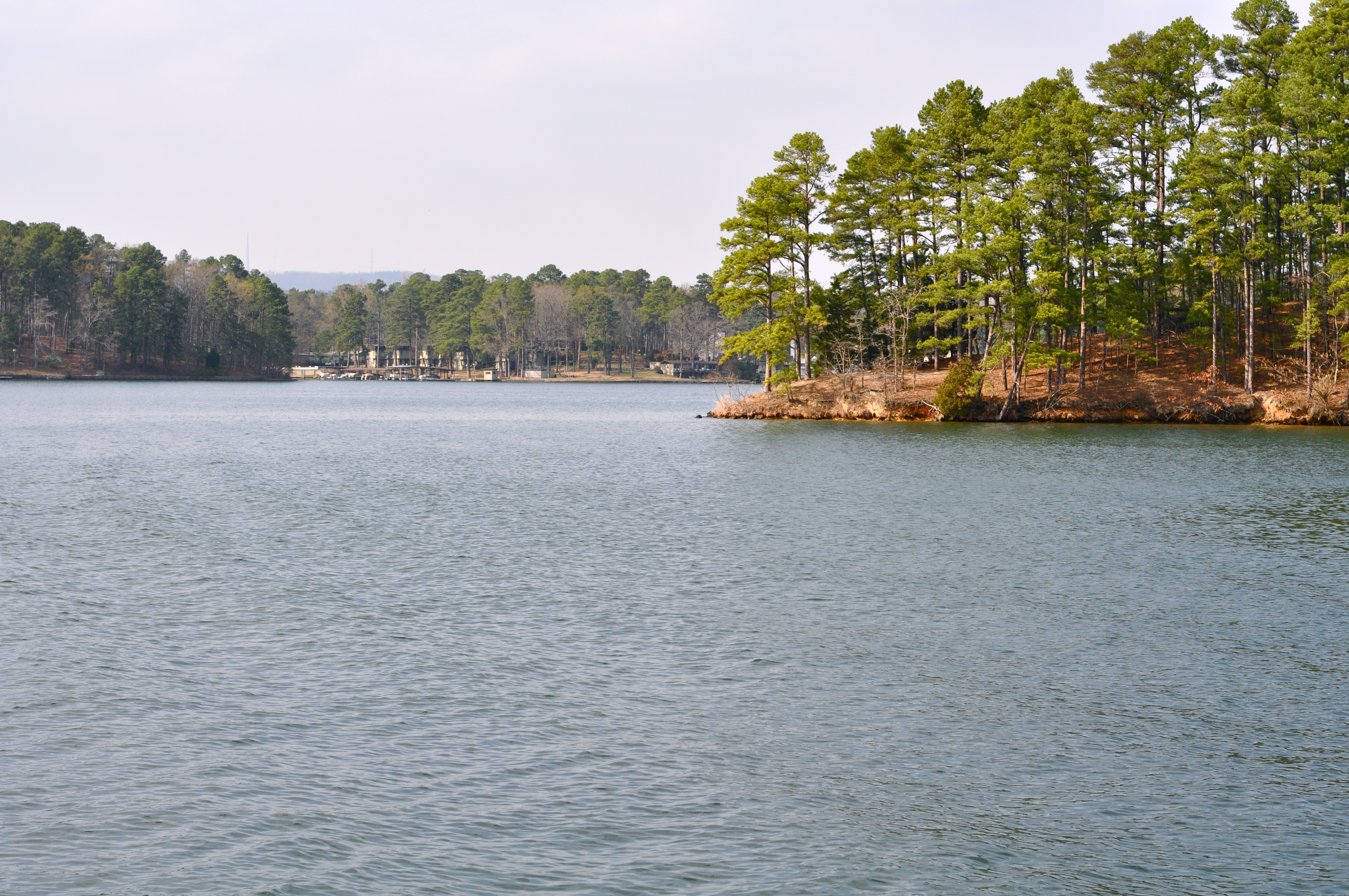
Lake Catherine

== See also ==
- List of Arkansas dams and reservoirs
- National Register of Historic Places listings in Garland County, Arkansas
- National Register of Historic Places listings in Hot Spring County, Arkansas
