= Pearcy, Arkansas =

- Census-designated place
- Location within Arkansas Location within the United States
- Coordinates: 34°25′53″N 93°17′19″W
- Country: United States
- State: Arkansas
- County: Garland
- Elevation: 620 ft (190 m)

Population (2020)
  - Total: 306
- Time zone: UTC-6 (Central (CST))
  - Summer (DST): UTC-5 (CDT)
- GNIS feature ID: 2805675

Pearcy is an unincorporated community and census-designated place (CDP) in Garland County, Arkansas, United States. It was first listed as a CDP in the 2020 census with a population of 306.

== History ==
In 2009 the rural community became noted as the site of the Pearcy murders, said to be a "robbery gone wrong."

On April 25, 2011, a tornado associated with the 2011 Super Outbreak hit the Pearcy area, destroying houses in nearby Sunshine.

Bruce Cozart, Republican member of the Arkansas House of Representatives from District 24, is a Pearcy native and a developer in Hot Springs.

== Demographics ==
Historical population
Census	Pop.	Note	%±
2020	306		—
U.S. Decennial Census; 2020

=== 2020 census ===
Pearcy CDP, Arkansas – Demographic Profile (NH = Non-Hispanic) Note: the US Census treats Hispanic/Latino as an ethnic category. This table excludes Latinos from the racial categories and assigns them to a separate category. Hispanics/Latinos may be of any race.
Race / Ethnicity	Pop 2020	% 2020
White alone (NH)	257	83.99%
Black or African American alone (NH)	4	1.31%
Native American or Alaska Native alone (NH)	5	1.63%
Asian alone (NH)	1	0.33%
Pacific Islander alone (NH)	0	0.00%
Some Other Race alone (NH)	0	0.00%
Mixed Race/Multi-Racial (NH)	28	9.15%
Hispanic or Latino (any race)	11	3.59%
Total	306	100.00%

== Education ==
It is in the Lake Hamilton School District.
