= Piney, Garland County, Arkansas =

Piney, Arkansas
- CDP
- Location in Garland County and the state of Arkansas
- Coordinates: 34°30′08″N 93°08′28″W
- Country: United States
- State: Arkansas
- County: Garland

Area
  - Total: 7.11 sq mi (18.42 km^{2})
  - Land: 6.51 sq mi (16.85 km^{2})
  - Water: 0.60 sq mi (1.56 km^{2})
- Elevation: 509 ft (155 m)

Population (2020)
  - Total: 5,238
  - Density: 805/sq mi (310.8/km^{2})
- Time zone: UTC-6 (Central (CST))
  - Summer (DST): UTC-5 (CDT)
- ZIP code: 71901
- Area code: 501
- FIPS code: 05-55610
- GNIS feature ID: 2403421

Piney is a census-designated place (CDP) in Garland County, Arkansas, United States. The population was 4,699 at the 2010 census.

== Geography ==
According to the United States Census Bureau, the CDP has a total area of 7.1 square miles (18.5 km^{2}), of which 6.5 square miles (16.9 km^{2}) is land and 0.6 square mile (1.5 km^{2}) (8.27%) is water.

== Demographics ==
Historical population
Census	Pop.	Note	%±
1990	2,500		—
2000	3,988		59.5%
2010	4,699		17.8%
2020	5,238		11.5%
U.S. Decennial Census

=== 2020 census ===
Piney racial composition
Race	Number	Percentage
White (non-Hispanic)	3,941	75.24%
Black or African American (non-Hispanic)	314	5.99%
Native American	39	0.74%
Asian	53	1.01%
Pacific Islander	2	0.04%
Other/Mixed	333	6.36%
Hispanic or Latino	556	10.61%

As of the 2020 United States census, there were 5,238 people, 1,977 households, and 1,129 families residing in the CDP.

=== 2000 census ===
As of the census of 2000, there were 3,988 people, 1,617 households, and 1,193 families residing in the CDP. The population density was 609.7 inhabitants per square mile (235.4/km^{2}). There were 1,868 housing units at an average density of 285.6 per square mile (110.3/km^{2}). The racial makeup of the CDP was 93.03% White, 2.26% Black or African American, 1.15% Native American, 0.18% Asian, 0.10% Pacific Islander, 1.35% from other races, and 1.93% from two or more races. 3.31% of the population were Hispanic or Latino of any race.

There were 1,617 households, out of which 33.3% had children under the age of 18 living with them, 56.3% were married couples living together, 12.8% had a female householder with no husband present, and 26.2% were non-families. 21.2% of all households were made up of individuals, and 7.3% had someone living alone who was 65 years of age or older. The average household size was 2.46 and the average family size was 2.83.

In the CDP, the population was spread out, with 25.3% under the age of 18, 7.5% from 18 to 24, 30.6% from 25 to 44, 23.5% from 45 to 64, and 13.2% who were 65 years of age or older. The median age was 36 years. For every 100 females, there were 100.8 males. For every 100 females age 18 and over, there were 96.8 males.

The median income for a household in the CDP was $31,827, and the median income for a family was $34,780. Males had a median income of $26,078 versus $20,709 for females. The per capita income for the CDP was $15,055. About 12.4% of families and 16.0% of the population were below the poverty line, including 21.8% of those under age 18 and 9.5% of those age 65 or over.

== Education ==
Most of the CDP is in the Lake Hamilton School District while another portion is in the Mountain Pine School District.
