= Crystal Springs, Arkansas =

Crystal Springs
- Census-designated place
- Crystal Springs's position in Arkansas. Crystal Springs (the United States)
- Coordinates: 34°31′29″N 93°20′01″W
- Country: United States
- State: Arkansas
- County: Garland
- Elevation: 666 ft (203 m)

Population (2020)
  - Total: 129
- Time zone: UTC-6 (Central (CST))
  - Summer (DST): UTC-5 (CDT)
- GNIS feature ID: 2805634

Crystal Springs (also spelled Crystalsprings) is an unincorporated community and census-designated place (CDP) in Garland County, Arkansas, United States. It was first listed as a CDP in the 2020 census with a population of 129.

On April 25, 2011, a tornado associated with the 2011 Super Outbreak hit the Crystal Springs area, destroying houses in nearby Sunshine.

== Demographics ==
Historical population
Census	Pop.	Note	%±
2020	129		—
U.S. Decennial Census; 2020

=== 2020 census ===
Crystal Springs CDP, Arkansas – Racial and ethnic composition Note: the US Census treats Hispanic/Latino as an ethnic category. This table excludes Latinos from the racial categories and assigns them to a separate category. Hispanics/Latinos may be of any race.
Race / Ethnicity (NH = Non-Hispanic)	Pop 2020	% 2020
White alone (NH)	113	87.60%
Black or African American alone (NH)	0	0.00%
Native American or Alaska Native alone (NH)	1	0.78%
Asian alone (NH)	0	0.00%
Pacific Islander alone (NH)	0	0.00%
Some Other Race alone (NH)	0	0.00%
Mixed Race or Multi-Racial (NH)	9	6.98%
Hispanic or Latino (any race)	6	4.65%
Total	129	100.00%

== Education ==
It is in the Lake Hamilton School District.
