= Garland County, Arkansas =

County in Arkansas, United States

- County
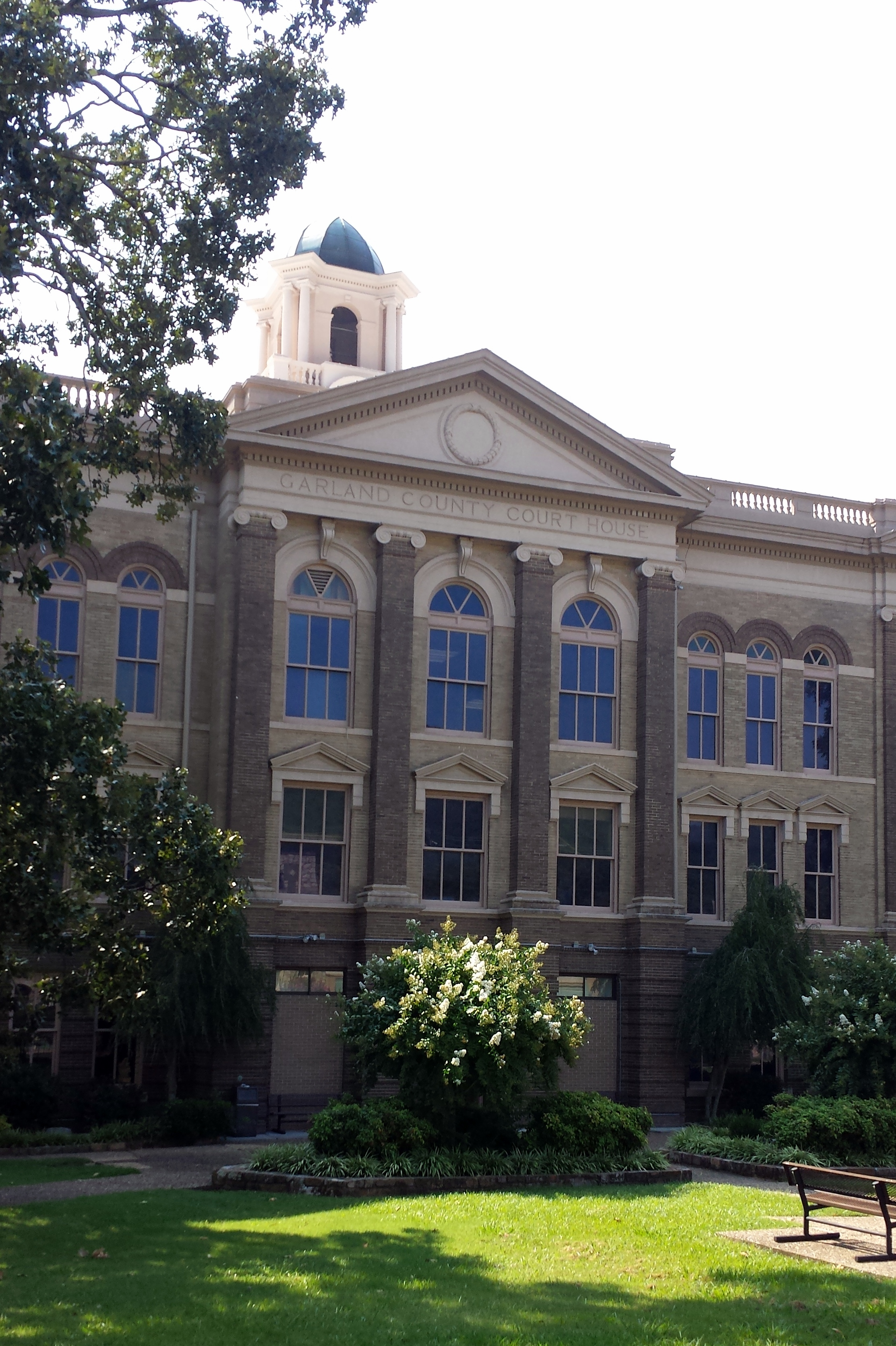
- Garland County Courthouse

- Seal

- Location within the U.S. state of Arkansas
- Coordinates: 34°35′01″N 93°07′39″W
- Country: United States
- State: Arkansas
- Founded: April 5, 1873
- Named for: Augustus Hill Garland
- Seat: Hot Springs
- Largest city: Hot Springs

Area
  - Total: 735 sq mi (1,900 km^{2})
  - Land: 678 sq mi (1,760 km^{2})
  - Water: 57 sq mi (150 km^{2}) 7.7%

Population (2020)
  - Total: 100,180
  - Estimate (2025): 99,695 ▼
  - Density: 148/sq mi (57.0/km^{2})
- Time zone: UTC−6 (Central)
  - Summer (DST): UTC−5 (CDT)
- Congressional district: 4th
- Website: www.garlandcounty.org

Garland County is a county located in the U.S. state of Arkansas. As of the 2020 census, the population was 100,180. The county seat is Hot Springs.

Garland County comprises the Hot Springs, Arkansas Metropolitan Statistical Area. The county includes Hot Springs National Park, the only national park in the state of Arkansas as well as the first property to be protected under federal legislation. A law was passed in 1832 supported by President Andrew Jackson to preserve this area, even before Arkansas was admitted as a state.

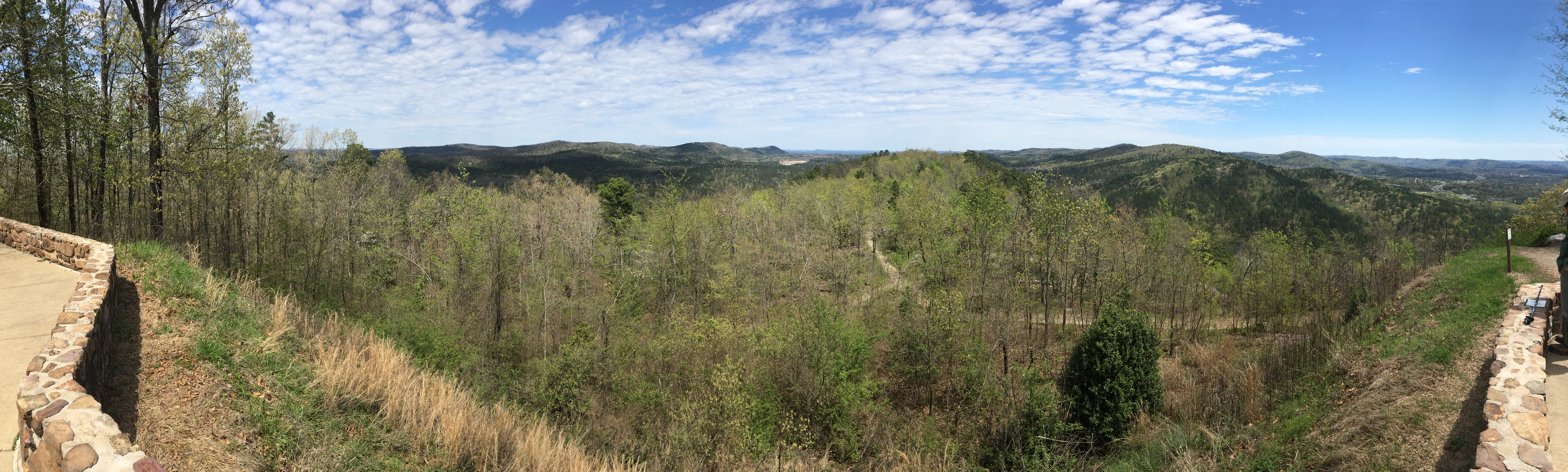
Hot Springs National Park, located in Garland County

== History ==
This area was occupied by the historic Natchitoches people, who frequented the hot springs for their healing powers. Their ancestors among regional indigenous peoples had been coming to this area for thousands of years before their time.

After acquiring the Louisiana Territory in 1803, which had been controlled by French and Spanish officials, President Thomas Jefferson requested William Dunbar, a planter and amateur scientist of Natchez, Mississippi, to explore this area. Dunbar led small group of a dozen soldiers and friend George Hunter, a chemist, to the Ouachita Mountains to report on the Indian tribes, minerals, and springs. They reached Hot Springs in December 1804, where they found a basic cabin used by visitors to the springs.

The first European-American settler was Jean Pierre Emanuel Prudhomme, a descendant of French colonists. An owner of a plantation at Red River, Prudhomme was suffering from illness and sought relief from the springs. In 1807 he built the first permanent European house by the springs, living here for two years. Isaac Cates and John Percival, two trappers from Alabama, joined him. Percival foresaw a great potential for the area and built log cabins in order to rent to visitors to the springs.

In 1828, Ludovicus Belding came with wife and children to visit the hot springs. After a few months they built a small hotel for the visitors of the springs.

In 1832 President Andrew Jackson signed legislation to protect the hot springs area for recreational use by American citizens as Hot Springs Reservation, the first time such action was taken. This was four years before Arkansas became a state, on June 15, 1836. A dispute among original settlers and their descendants over control of the property was settled by the US Supreme Court in 1877 in favor of the federal government. Hot Springs National Park was established in 1921 and is managed by the National Park Service.

Garland County is Arkansas' 68th county, formed during the Reconstruction era on April 5, 1873, from portions of Hot Spring, Montgomery, and Saline counties. It was named for Augustus H. Garland, eleventh governor of Arkansas. It is the only county in the United States with this name.

== Geography ==
According to the U.S. Census Bureau, the county has a total area of 735 square miles (1,900 km^{2}), of which 678 square miles (1,760 km^{2}) is land and 57 square miles (150 km^{2}) (7.7%) is water.

=== Transit ===
- Hot Springs Intracity Transit

=== Major highways ===
- U.S. Highway 70
- U.S. Highway 270
- Highway 5
- Highway 7
- Highway 88
- Highway 128
- Highway 171
- Highway 192
- Highway 227
- Highway 290
- Highway 298

=== Adjacent counties ===
- Perry County (north)
- Saline County (east)
- Hot Spring County (south)
- Montgomery County (west)
- Yell County (northwest)

=== National protected areas ===
- Hot Springs National Park
- Ouachita National Forest (part)

== Demographics ==
Historical population
Census	Pop.	Note	%±
1880	9,023		—
1890	15,328		69.9%
1900	18,773		22.5%
1910	27,271		45.3%
1920	25,785		−5.4%
1930	36,031		39.7%
1940	41,664		15.6%
1950	47,102		13.1%
1960	46,697		−0.9%
1970	54,131		15.9%
1980	70,531		30.3%
1990	73,397		4.1%
2000	88,068		20.0%
2010	96,024		9.0%
2020	100,180		4.3%
2025 (est.)	99,695	▼	−0.5%
U.S. Decennial Census; 1790–1960 1900–1990; 1990–2000 2010

=== 2020 census ===
As of the 2020 census, the county had a population of 100,180. The median age was 45.6 years. 20.4% of residents were under the age of 18 and 24.4% of residents were 65 years of age or older. For every 100 females there were 93.7 males, and for every 100 females age 18 and over there were 90.5 males age 18 and over.

The racial makeup of the county was 78.7% White, 8.1% Black or African American, 0.8% American Indian and Alaska Native, 1.0% Asian, 0.1% Native Hawaiian and Pacific Islander, 3.4% from some other race, and 8.0% from two or more races. Hispanic or Latino residents of any race comprised 7.0% of the population.

66.2% of residents lived in urban areas, while 33.8% lived in rural areas.

There were 42,997 households in the county, of which 25.5% had children under the age of 18 living in them. Of all households, 44.3% were married-couple households, 18.7% were households with a male householder and no spouse or partner present, and 30.0% were households with a female householder and no spouse or partner present. About 31.4% of all households were made up of individuals and 15.6% had someone living alone who was 65 years of age or older.

There were 52,326 housing units, of which 17.8% were vacant. Among occupied housing units, 67.6% were owner-occupied and 32.4% were renter-occupied. The homeowner vacancy rate was 2.3% and the rental vacancy rate was 11.2%.

=== 2000 census ===
As of the 2000 United States census, there were 88,068 people, 37,813 households, and 25,259 families residing in the county. The population density was 130 people per square mile (50 people/km^{2}). There were 44,953 housing units at an average density of 66 units per square mile (25 units/km^{2}). The racial makeup of the county was 88.85% White, 7.80% Black or African American, 0.61% Native American, 0.50% Asian, 0.03% Pacific Islander, 0.72% from other races, and 1.49% from two or more races. 2.56% of the population were Hispanic or Latino of any race.

There were 37,813 households, out of which 25.10% had children under the age of 18 living with them, 53.20% were married couples living together, 10.10% had a female householder with no husband present, and 33.20% were non-families. 28.80% of all households were made up of individuals, and 13.50% had someone living alone who was 65 years of age or older. The average household size was 2.28 and the average family size was 2.78.

In the county, the population was spread out, with 21.30% under the age of 18, 7.30% from 18 to 24, 25.20% from 25 to 44, 25.10% from 45 to 64, and 21.20% who were 65 years of age or older. The median age was 42 years. For every 100 females there were 94.40 males. For every 100 females age 18 and over, there were 90.80 males.

The median income for a household in the county was $31,724, and the median income for a family was $38,079. Males had a median income of $28,117 versus $20,421 for females. The per capita income for the county was $18,631. About 10.50% of families and 14.60% of the population were below the poverty line, including 22.70% of those under age 18 and 8.60% of those age 65 or over.

== Communities ==
=== Cities ===
- Hot Springs (county seat)
- Mountain Pine

=== Towns ===
- Fountain Lake
- Lonsdale

=== Census-designated places ===
- Crystal Springs
- Hot Springs Village
- Lake Hamilton
- Pearcy
- Piney
- Rockwell

=== Unincorporated communities ===
- Bear
- Jessieville
- Royal

=== Townships ===
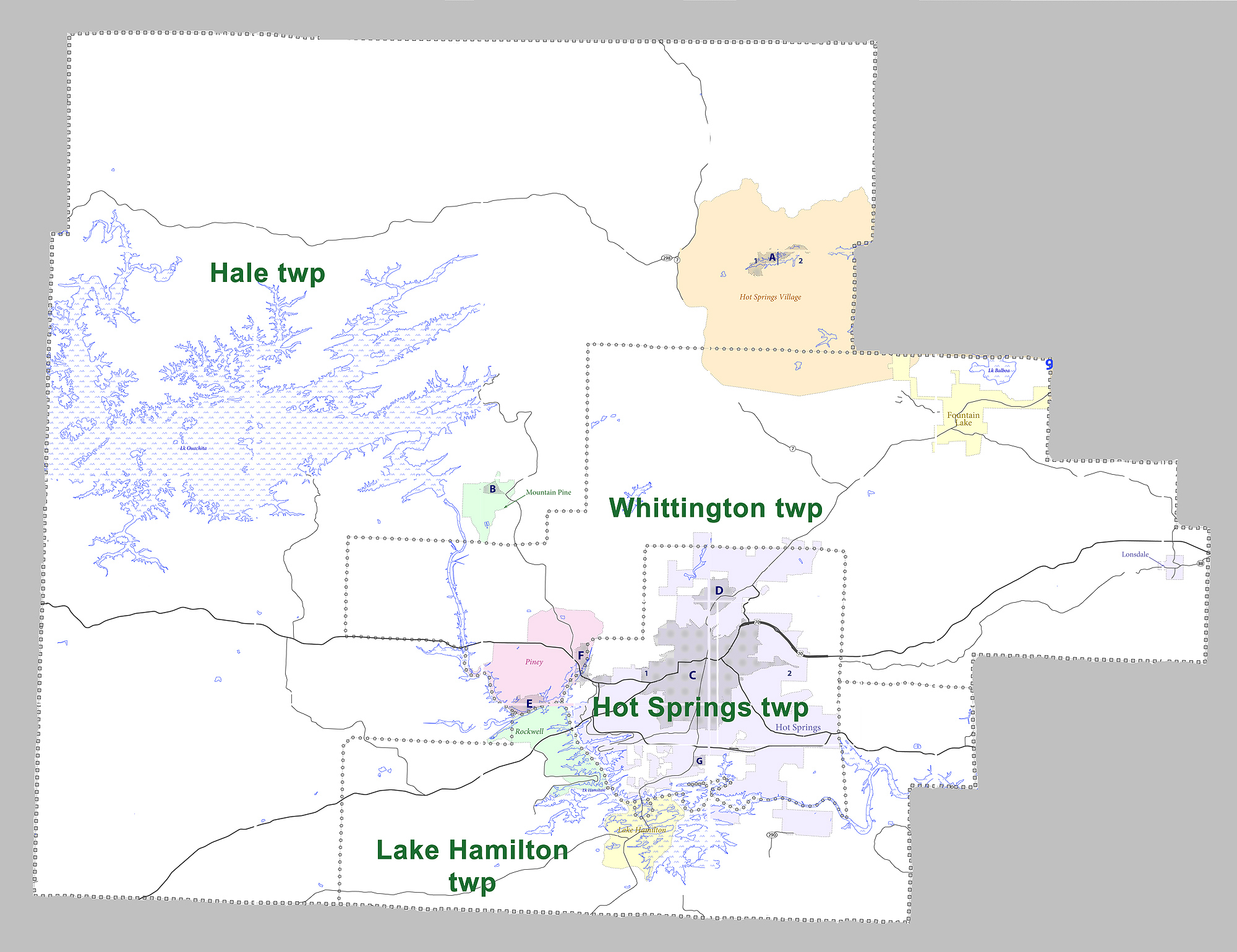
Townships in Garland County, Arkansas as of 2010

Townships in Arkansas are the divisions of a county. Each township includes unincorporated areas; some may have incorporated cities or towns within part of their boundaries. Arkansas townships have limited purposes in modern times. However, the United States census does list Arkansas population based on townships (sometimes referred to as "county subdivisions" or "minor civil divisions"). Townships are also of value for historical purposes in terms of genealogical research. Each town or city is within one or more townships in an Arkansas county based on census maps and publications. The townships of Garland County are listed below; listed in parentheses are the cities, towns, and/or census-designated places that are fully or partially inside the township.

Township	FIPS code	ANSI code (GNIS ID)	Population center(s)	Pop. (2010)	Pop. density (/mi^{2})	Pop. density (/km^{2})	Total area (mi^{2})	Total area (km^{2})	Land area (mi^{2})	Land area (km^{2})	Water area (mi^{2})	Water area (km^{2})	Geographic coordinates
Hale	05-91581	00066591	Mountain Pine, most of CDP Hot Springs Village, small part of CDP Rockwell	16,142	41.99	16.21	428.979	1,111	384.389	995.6	44.590	115.5	34.633909°N 93.198598°W
Hot Springs	05-91773	00066592	most of Hot Springs	41,479	801.70	309.54	54.073	140.0	51.739	134.0	2.334	6.045	34.494338°N 93.047883°W
Lake Hamilton	05-92100	00066594	CDP Lake Hamilton, most of CDP Rockwell	20,534	260.45	100.56	86.717	224.6	78.839	204.2	7.878	20.40	34.431040°N 93.086323°W
Whittington	05-94047	00066602	Fountain Lake, Lonsdale, CDP Piney, part of CDP Hot Springs Village, small part of Hot Springs	17,599	108.09	41.73	164.852	427.0	162.814	421.7	2.038	5.278	34.568990°N 92.999676°W
Source: "Census 2010 U.S. Gazetteer Files: County Subdivisions in Arkansas". U.S. Census Bureau, Geography Division. Archived from the original on May 31, 2014. Source: "Census 2010 U.S. Gazetteer Files". U.S. Census Bureau, Geography Division.

== Government and politics ==
=== Government ===
The county government is a constitutional body granted specific powers by the Constitution of Arkansas and the Arkansas Code. The quorum court is the legislative branch of the county government and controls all spending and revenue collection. Representatives are called justices of the peace and are elected from county districts every even-numbered year. The number of districts in a county vary from nine to fifteen, and district boundaries are drawn by the county election commission. The Garland County Quorum Court has thirteen members. Presiding over quorum court meetings is the county judge, who serves as the chief operating officer of the county. The county judge is elected at-large and does not vote in quorum court business, although capable of vetoing quorum court decisions.

Garland County, Arkansas Elected countywide officials
Position	Officeholder	Party
County Judge	Darryl Mahoney	Republican
County Clerk	Sarah Smith	Republican
Circuit Clerk	Kristie Womble-Hughes	Republican
Sheriff	Mike McCormick	Republican
Treasurer	Vivian Thomas	(Unknown)
Collector	Rebecca D. Talbert	Republican
Assessor	Shannon Sharp	Republican
Coroner	Jayson Neighbors	(Unknown)

The composition of the Quorum Court following the 2024 elections is 12 Republicans and 1 Democrat. Justices of the Peace (members) of the Quorum Court following the elections are:

- District 1: Micah Braughton (R)
- District 2: Thomas J. Anderson (D)
- District 3: Susan Garner Jones (R)
- District 4: Jimmy Young (R)
- District 5: Ralf Bailes (R)
- District 6: Ben Hooten (R)
- District 7: Dayton Myers (R)
- District 8: Alan M. Floyd (R)
- District 9: Brian A. Peters (R)
- District 10: Debbie McGrew (R)
- District 11: Ronald T. Hunter (R)
- District 12: Jeremy W. Brown (R)
- District 13: Ralph Edds (R)

Additionally, the townships of Garland County are entitled to elect their own respective constables, as set forth by the Constitution of Arkansas. Constables are largely of historical significance as they were used to keep the peace in rural areas when travel was more difficult. The township constables as of the 2024 elections are:

- Hale: Jason Brasfield (R)
- Hot Springs: Jim Kerr (R)
- Lake Hamilton: Steve Thacker (R)
- Whittington: John McCaleb (R)

=== Politics ===
Over the past few election cycles Garland County has trended heavily towards the GOP. The last Democrat to carry this county was Bill Clinton in 1996.

United States presidential election results for Garland County, Arkansas
Year	Republican		Democratic		Third party(ies)	
Year	No.	%	No.	%	No.	%
1892	940	37.10%	1,456	57.46%	138	5.45%
1896	703	31.33%	1,465	65.29%	76	3.39%
1900	708	42.62%	940	56.59%	13	0.78%
1904	854	50.92%	804	47.94%	19	1.13%
1908	1,105	42.91%	1,340	52.04%	130	5.05%
1912	300	14.80%	1,046	51.60%	681	33.60%
1916	1,057	38.65%	1,678	61.35%	0	0.00%
1920	1,423	45.45%	1,619	51.71%	89	2.84%
1924	1,064	37.50%	1,501	52.91%	272	9.59%
1928	2,720	48.94%	2,823	50.79%	15	0.27%
1932	833	16.38%	4,252	83.60%	1	0.02%
1936	1,217	29.09%	2,931	70.07%	35	0.84%
1940	1,424	29.84%	3,335	69.89%	13	0.27%
1944	2,069	36.50%	3,596	63.43%	4	0.07%
1948	2,286	31.95%	3,764	52.61%	1,104	15.43%
1952	7,848	60.07%	5,165	39.53%	52	0.40%
1956	9,427	62.53%	5,437	36.06%	212	1.41%
1960	7,204	51.66%	6,333	45.42%	407	2.92%
1964	9,952	46.01%	11,591	53.59%	86	0.40%
1968	7,674	37.83%	5,655	27.88%	6,955	34.29%
1972	15,602	73.90%	5,207	24.66%	303	1.44%
1976	10,394	39.72%	15,707	60.02%	69	0.26%
1980	15,739	52.96%	12,515	42.11%	1,463	4.92%
1984	21,213	62.47%	11,484	33.82%	1,261	3.71%
1988	19,281	60.93%	11,406	36.05%	955	3.02%
1992	12,886	35.80%	18,811	52.26%	4,298	11.94%
1996	13,662	37.73%	19,211	53.06%	3,333	9.21%
2000	19,098	53.15%	15,840	44.08%	997	2.77%
2004	21,734	54.13%	18,040	44.93%	380	0.95%
2008	26,825	61.36%	15,899	36.37%	995	2.28%
2012	26,014	63.87%	13,804	33.89%	910	2.23%
2016	26,087	63.93%	12,311	30.17%	2,407	5.90%
2020	29,069	65.77%	14,045	31.78%	1,085	2.45%
2024	28,359	67.00%	13,015	30.75%	953	2.25%

== See also ==
- List of lakes in Garland County, Arkansas
- National Register of Historic Places listings in Garland County, Arkansas
