= National Register of Historic Places listings in Montgomery County, Arkansas =

Location of Montgomery County in Arkansas

This is a list of the National Register of Historic Places listings in Montgomery County, Arkansas.

This is intended to be a complete list of the properties and districts on the National Register of Historic Places in Montgomery County, Arkansas, United States. The locations of National Register properties and districts for which the latitude and longitude coordinates are included below, may be seen in a map.

There are 14 properties and districts listed on the National Register in the county. One other property was once listed but have been removed.

Contents: Counties in Arkansas
- Arkansas
- Ashley
- Baxter
- Benton
- Boone
- Bradley
- Calhoun
- Carroll
- Chicot
- Clark
- Clay
- Cleburne
- Cleveland
- Columbia
- Conway
- Craighead
- Crawford
- Crittenden
- Cross
- Dallas
- Desha
- Drew
- Faulkner
- Franklin
- Fulton
- Garland
- Grant
- Greene
- Hempstead
- Hot Spring
- Howard
- Independence
- Izard
- Jackson
- Jefferson
- Johnson
- Lafayette
- Lawrence
- Lee
- Lincoln
- Little River
- Logan
- Lonoke
- Madison
- Marion
- Miller
- Mississippi
- Monroe
- Montgomery
- Nevada
- Newton
- Ouachita
- Perry
- Phillips
- Pike
- Poinsett
- Polk
- Pope
- Prairie
- Pulaski (Little Rock)
- Randolph
- St. Francis
- Saline
- Scott
- Searcy
- Sebastian
- Sevier
- Sharp
- Stone
- Union
- Van Buren
- Washington
- White
- Woodruff
- Yell

This National Park Service list is complete through NPS recent listings posted December 19, 2025.

== Current listings ==
	Name on the Register	Image	Date listed	Location	City or town	Description
1	Arkansas Research and Test Station (ARTS)		September 21, 2017 (#100001650)	Reganda Springs Trail; 34°22′12″N 93°39′57″W	Caddo Gap	
2	Caddo Valley Academy Complex	Caddo Valley Academy Complex	May 16, 2002 (#02000485)	Jct. 9th St. and Smokey Hollow Rd. 34°27′21″N 93°40′45″W	Norman	
3	CCC Company 741 Powder Magazine Historic District		March 30, 2007 (#07000201)	Forest Service Road 177M, northeast of Norman; 34°28′56″N 93°36′30″W	Norman	
4	Cogburn Dipping Vat		June 7, 2006 (#06000467)	West of Forest Service Road 73, east of County Road 1 south of its junction with Highway 8; 34°26′44″N 93°47′00″W	Black Springs	
5	Collier Springs Shelter	Collier Springs Shelter	October 20, 1993 (#93001083)	Forest Service Road 177, northeast of Norman, in the Ouachita National Forest; 34°29′01″N 93°35′33″W	Norman	
6	Crystal Springs Camp Shelter	Crystal Springs Camp Shelter	October 21, 1993 (#93001087)	Forest Service Road 177 east of Highway 27 in the Ouachita National Forest; 34°28′46″N 93°38′17″W	Norman	Demolished by falling tree, 2016
7	Crystal Springs Dam		October 21, 1993 (#93001088)	Forest Service Road 177 east of Highway 27 in the Ouachita National Forest; 34°28′45″N 93°38′15″W	Norman	
8	Guinn Dipping Vat		June 7, 2006 (#06000465)	South of Forest Service Road 37 west of U.S. Route 70; 34°35′33″N 93°40′28″W	Mauldin	
9	Huddleston Store and McKinzie Store	Huddleston Store and McKinzie Store	October 4, 1984 (#84000007)	Highway 88; 34°35′00″N 93°54′18″W	Pine Ridge	
10	Montgomery County Courthouse	Montgomery County Courthouse	August 27, 1976 (#76000441)	Court Sq. 34°33′28″N 93°37′56″W	Mount Ida	
11	Mount Ida Cities Service Filling Station	Mount Ida Cities Service Filling Station	November 19, 2001 (#01001230)	204 Whittington; 34°33′23″N 93°38′01″W	Mount Ida	
12	Norman Town Square	Norman Town Square	February 25, 1993 (#93000092)	Bounded by Highway 8 and 8th, Gurdon, and 7th Sts. 34°27′17″N 93°40′49″W	Norman	
13	Reeves-Melson House	Reeves-Melson House	December 5, 1985 (#85003069)	Southeast of Montgomery adjacent to a branch of Mazarn Creek; 34°26′09″N 93°24′37″W	Bonnerdale	
14	Womble District Administration House No. 1	Womble District Administration House No. 1	October 20, 1993 (#93001101)	Northern side of U.S. Route 270, east of Mt. Ida; 34°32′22″N 93°36′09″W	Mount Ida	

== Former listings ==
	Name on the Register	Image	Date listed	Date removed	Location	City or town	Description
1	Mount Ida Esso Service Station		November 19, 2001 (#01001231)	September 24, 2012	114 U.S. Route 270; 34°33′29″N 93°37′55″W	Mount Ida	

== See also ==
- List of National Historic Landmarks in Arkansas
- National Register of Historic Places listings in Arkansas
