= Crystal Campground =

- Crystal Springs Camp Shelter
- U.S. National Register of Historic Places
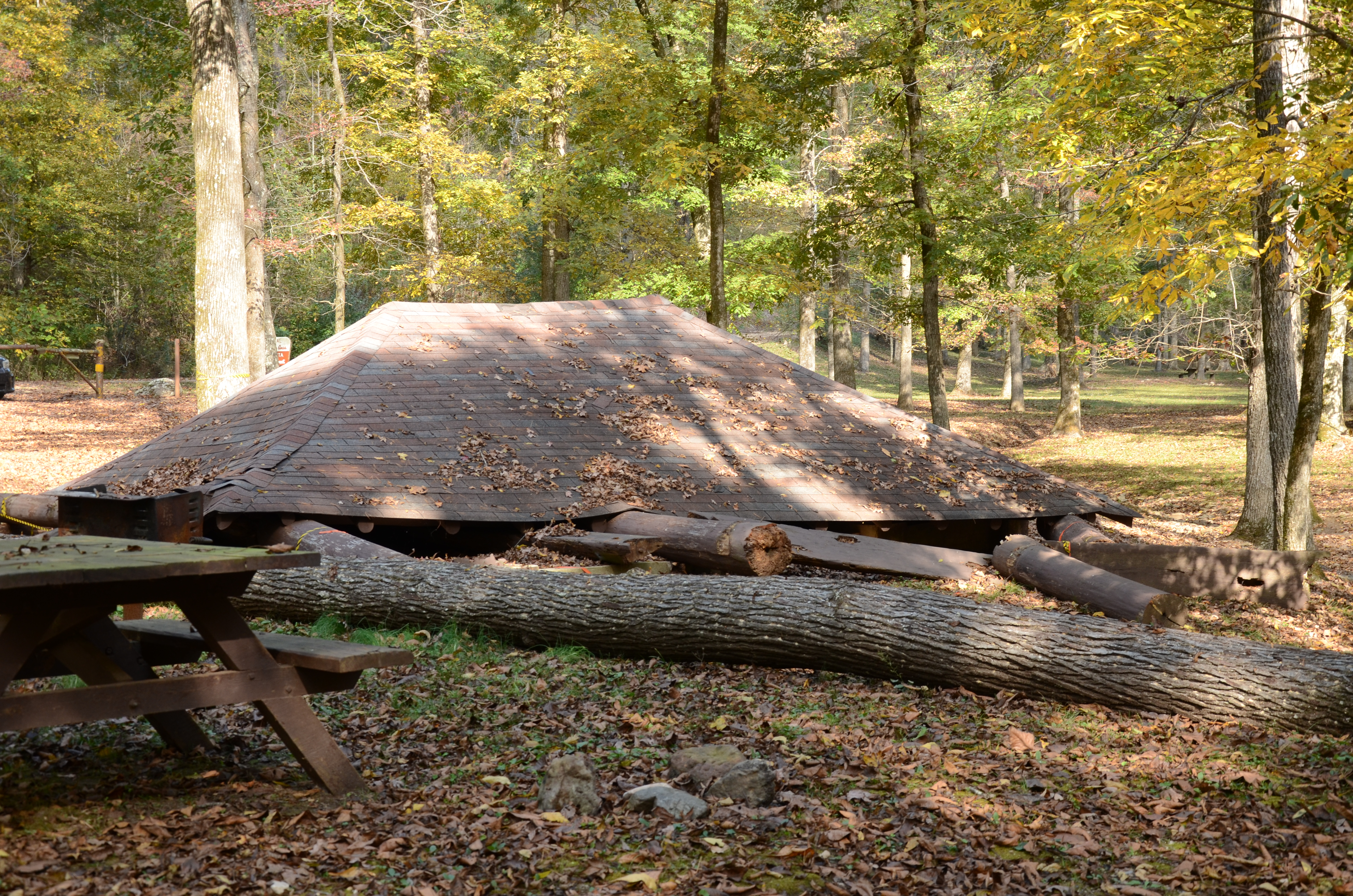

- Location within Arkansas Location within the United States
- Nearest city: Norman, Arkansas
- Coordinates: 34°28′46″N 93°38′17″W
- Area: less than one acre
- Built: 1939
- Built by: Civilian Conservation Corps
- Architectural style: Rustic
- MPS: Facilities Constructed by the CCC in Arkansas MPS
- NRHP reference No.: 93001087
- Added to NRHP: October 21, 1993

The Crystal Campground is located on Forest Road 177 in Ouachita National Forest, northeast of Norman, Arkansas. The campground has nine campsites and a picnic shelter, and provides access to outdoor recreational activities including hiking, swimming, and fishing. The swimming area is made possible by the Crystal Springs Dam, a 30-foot (9.1 m) fieldstone dam built in 1935 by the Civilian Conservation Corps, that impounds Montgomery Creek to provide a swimming hole. The campground's main picnic shelter was also built by the CCC at that time. Both the dam and the shelter were listed on the National Register of Historic Places in 1993. The picnic shelter was knocked over by a falling tree.

== See also ==
- Collier Springs Picnic Area, further east on FR 177
- National Register of Historic Places listings in Montgomery County, Arkansas
