= CCC Company 741 Powder Magazine Historic District =

- U.S. National Register of Historic Places
- Location within Arkansas Location within the United States
- Nearest city: Norman, Arkansas
- Coordinates: 34°28′56″N 93°36′30″W
- Area: 6 acres (2.4 ha)
- Built by: Civilian Conservation Corps
- MPS: Facilities Constructed by the CCC in Arkansas MPS
- NRHP reference No.: 07000201
- Added to NRHP: March 30, 2007

The CCC Company 741 Powder Magazine Historic District encompasses two structures built by Camp 741 of the Civilian Conservation Corps c. 1936. The camp, the first established in Arkansas, used these structures to store explosive materials used in road and bridge construction projects. The two structures have concrete bases and tops, and have walls of cut fieldstone and concrete. The main magazine is 8 by 16 feet (2.4 m × 4.9 m), and the blasting cap storage building is about 10 by 10 feet (3.0 m × 3.0 m). The main magazine is located a short way north of Forest Road 177M in Ouachita National Forest; the blasting cap storage building is about 113 metres (371 ft) to its northwest.

The buildings were listed on the National Register of Historic Places in 2007.

== See also ==
- National Register of Historic Places listings in Montgomery County, Arkansas
