= Norman Town Square =

- U.S. National Register of Historic Places
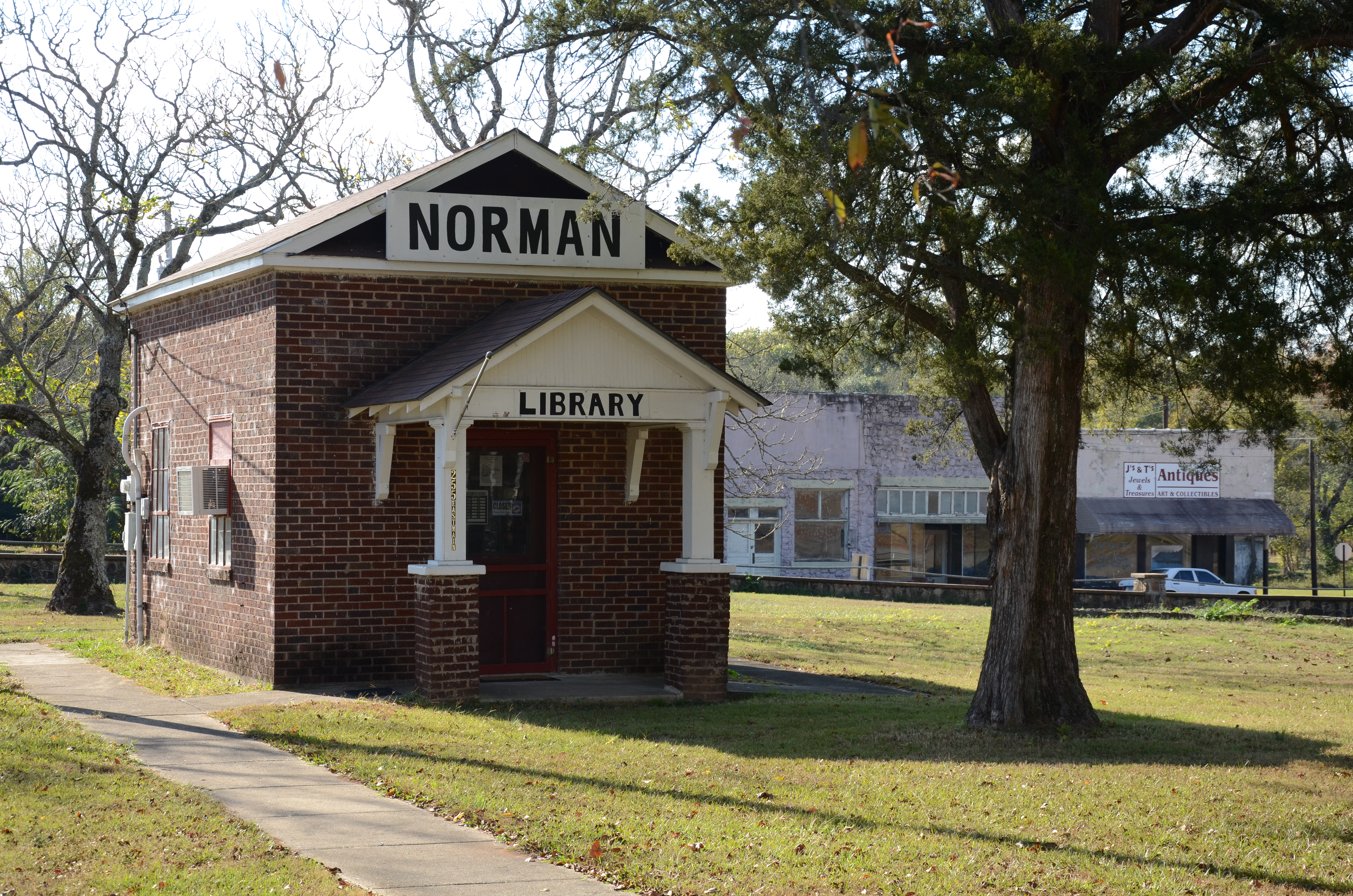

- Location within Arkansas Location within the United States
- Location: Bounded by AR 8 and 8th, Gurdon and 7th Sts., Norman, Arkansas
- Coordinates: 34°27′17″N 93°40′49″W
- Area: 1.5 acres (0.61 ha)
- Built: 1935–1940
- Built by: Emmory Black and G.S. Mitchell (stonemasons), Works Progress Administration
- Architectural style: Bungalow/craftsman, Plain Traditional
- NRHP reference No.: 93000092
- Added to NRHP: February 25, 1993

The Norman Town Square is a public park at the center of Norman, Arkansas. It is bounded by 9th Street and Golf Course Road to the north and south, and Arkansas Highway 8 and Gurdon Avenue to the east and west. The park is about 1.5 acres (0.61 ha) in size, and is mostly open lawn, with a low stone retaining wall on the street-facing edges. The town library, built in 1935 with funding from the Works Progress Administration, stands at the center of the park, and there are four diamond-shaped flower planting areas located near the corners of the park, built in 1937 with WPA funding. It is the only known Depression-era town square laid out and built in Montgomery County.

The park was listed on the National Register of Historic Places in 1993.

== See also ==
- National Register of Historic Places listings in Montgomery County, Arkansas
