= William Fadjo Cravens =

American politician (1899–1974)

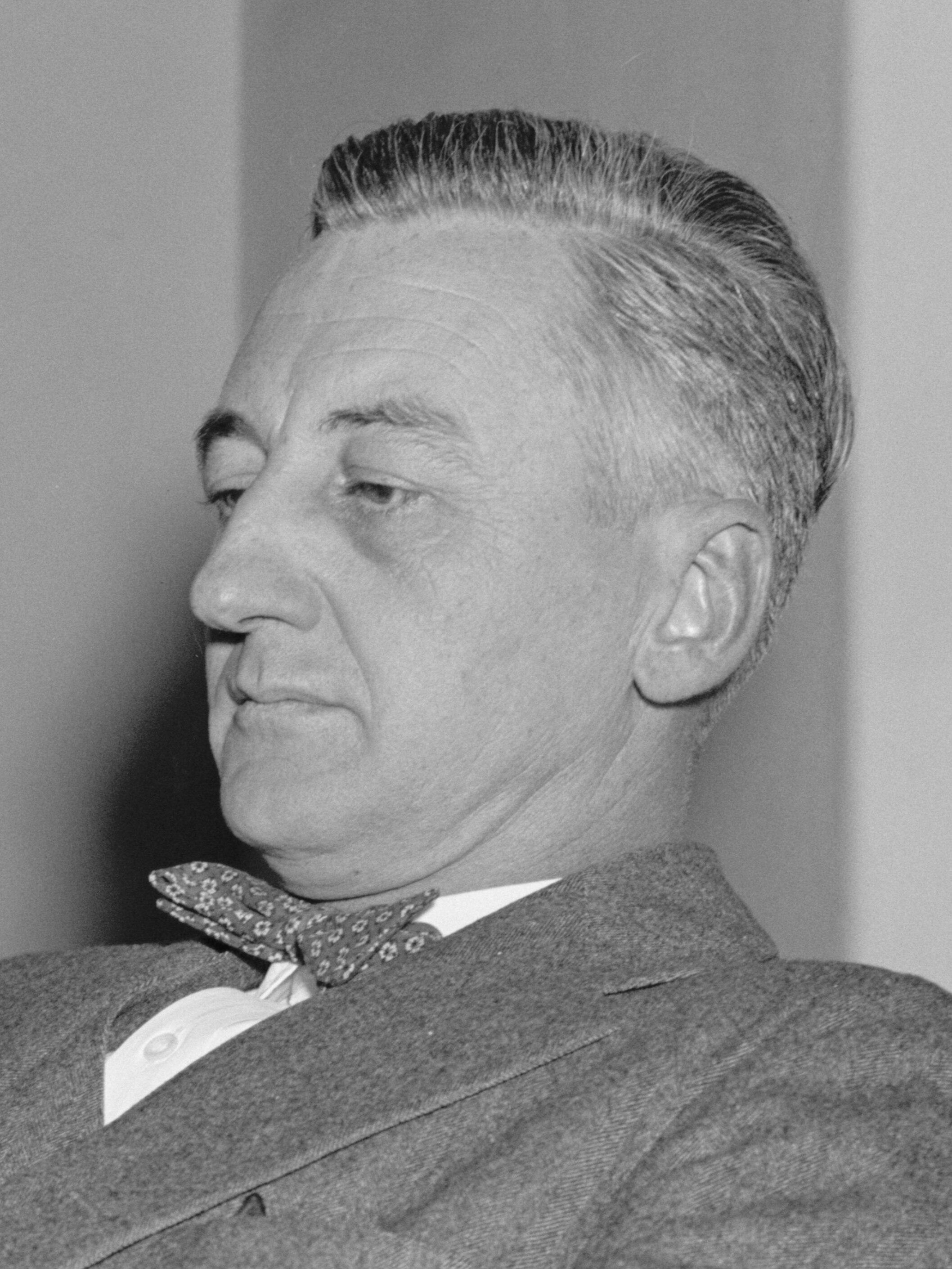

Member of the U.S. House of Representatives from Arkansas's 4th district
- In office September 12, 1939 – January 3, 1949
- Preceded by: William B. Cravens
- Succeeded by: Boyd A. Tackett

Personal details
- Born: February 15, 1899 Fort Smith, Arkansas, US
- Died: April 16, 1974 (aged 75) Fort Smith, Arkansas, US
- Party: Democratic
- Spouse: Elizabeth B. Echols Cravens
- Children: Katherine Elizabeth Cravens; William Fadjo Cravens
- Education: Washington & Lee University
- Profession: Attorney

Military service
- Allegiance: United States
- Branch/service: United States Navy
- Rank: Seaman

William Fadjo Cravens (February 15, 1899 – April 16, 1974) was an American politician and a United States Congressman from 1939 until 1949.

== Biography ==
Cravens was born on February 15, 1899, in Fort Smith, Arkansas, the son of Arkansas Congressman William B. Cravens and Carolyn (Dyal) Cravens. He attended the University of Arkansas and the University of Pittsburgh; he also attended Washington & Lee University in Lexington, Virginia, from which he received a law degree. He was married on February 16, 1926, to Elizabeth B. Echols and they had two children, Katherine Elizabeth Cravens and William Fadjo Cravens.

== Career ==
Cravens served in World War I in the United States Navy as a seaman. He passed the bar in 1920 and began a law practice in Fort Smith. He took the position of City Attorney in Fort Smith.

Elected to the 76th United States Congress in a special election, Cravens filled the term of his father, William Ben Cravens, who had died in office, Cravens was re-elected, and served in Congress from September 12, 1939, to January 3, 1949.

== Death ==
Cravens died in Fort Smith, Sebastian County, Arkansas, on April 16, 1974 (age 75 years, 60 days). He is interred at Forest Park Cemetery, Fort Smith, Arkansas.

U.S. House of Representatives
Preceded by William B. Cravens	Member of the U.S. House of Representatives from Arkansas's 4th congressional district 1939–1949	Succeeded by Boyd A. Tackett
