= Otis Wingo =

American politician

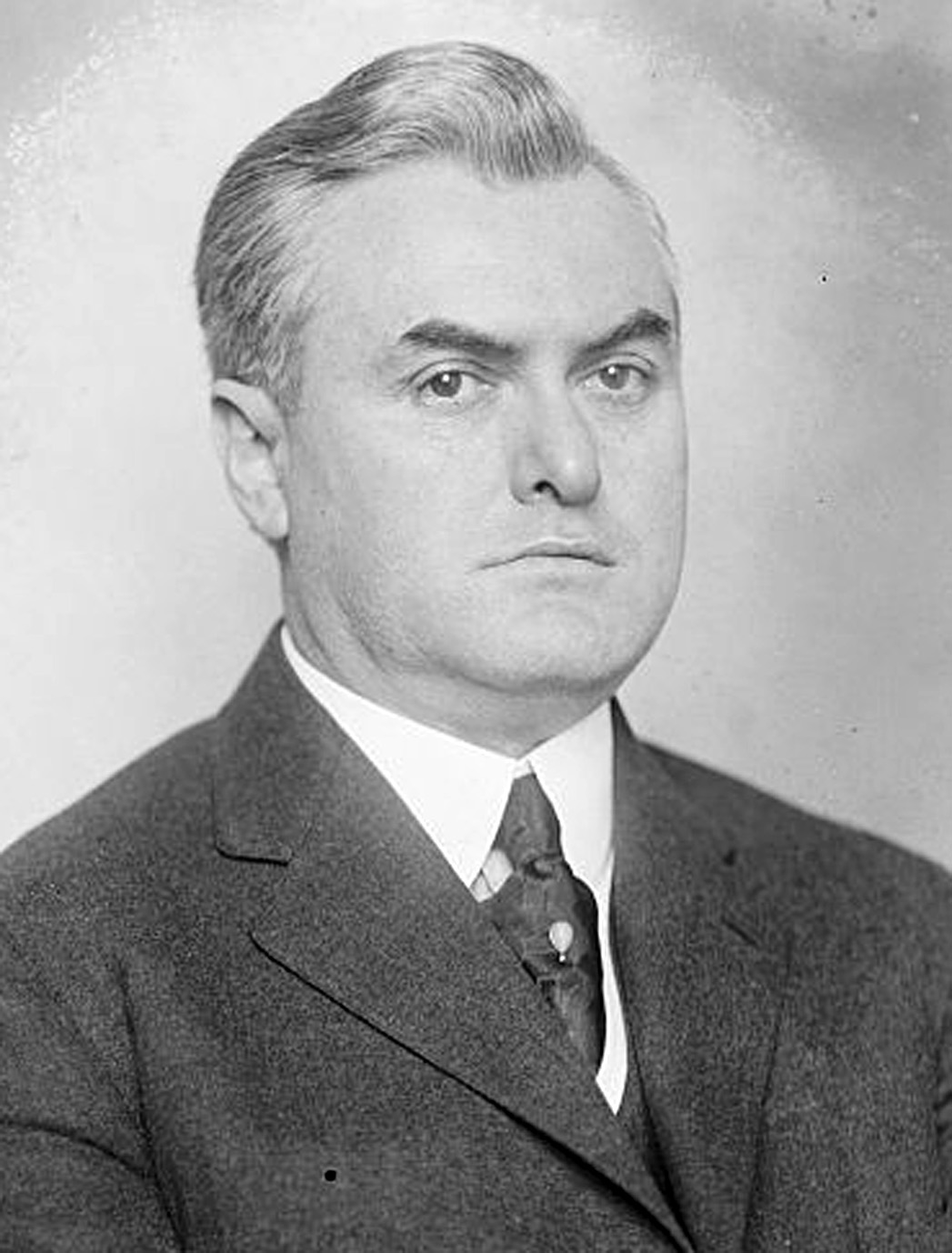

Member of the U.S. House of Representatives from Arkansas's 4th district
- In office March 4, 1913 – October 21, 1930
- Preceded by: William B. Cravens
- Succeeded by: Effiegene Wingo

Member of the Arkansas State Senate
- In office 1907-1909

Personal details
- Born: Otis Theodore Wingo; June 18, 1877 Weakley County, Tennessee, U.S.
- Died: October 21, 1930 (aged 53) Baltimore, Maryland, U.S.
- Resting place: Rock Creek Cemetery; Washington, D.C., U.S.
- Party: Democratic
- Spouse: Effiegene Locke Wingo
- Children: Blanche Wingo
- Education: Bethel College; McFerrin College; Valparaiso University
- Occupation: Attorney

Otis Theodore Wingo (June 18, 1877 – October 21, 1930) was an American lawyer and politician who served as a U.S. representative from Arkansas's 4th congressional district from 1913 to 1930. He also served a term in the Arkansas Senate. He was the husband of his successor in office, Effiegene Wingo.

== Biography ==
Born in Weakley County in northwestern Tennessee, Wingo attended the public schools, Bethel College at McKenzie, Tennessee, the former McFerrin College at Martin in Weakley County, Tennessee, and Valparaiso University in Indiana.

=== Early career ===
He taught school and studied law, having been admitted to the bar in 1900. He established his practice in De Queen in Sevier County in southwestern Arkansas. From 1907 to 1909, Wingo was a member of the Arkansas State Senate.

=== Congress ===
In 1912, Wingo was elected as a Democrat to the Sixty-third and to the eight succeeding Congresses, having served from March 4, 1913, until his death while undergoing surgery in Baltimore, Maryland, on October 21, 1930.

==== Advocacy for national park ====
In 1927, Wingo joined his fellow Democrat, U.S. Senator Joseph Taylor Robinson, and Republican State Representative Osro Cobb of Montgomery County in proposing the establishment of a second national park in Arkansas which would have been located in the scenic Ouachita National Forest about halfway between Little Rock and Shreveport, Louisiana. The proposal, which would have been in driving distance of then some 45 million Americans, was pocket vetoed by U.S. President Calvin Coolidge.

=== Death and burial ===
Upon Wingo's death, Cobb was urged by his party to contest the vacant U.S. House seat in a special election, but he instead deferred to Wingo's widow, Effiegene, who served until 1933.

Wingo and his wife are interred at Rock Creek Cemetery in Washington, D.C.

== See also ==
- List of members of the United States Congress who died in office (1900–1949)

U.S. House of Representatives
Preceded by William B. Cravens	Member of the U.S. House of Representatives from Arkansas's 4th congressional district 1913-1930	Succeeded by Effiegene L. Wingo
