= Guinn Dipping Vat =

- U.S. National Register of Historic Places
- Location within Arkansas Location within the United States
- Location: S of Forest Serive Rd. 37 W of US 70, Mauldin, Arkansas
- Coordinates: 34°35′33″N 93°40′28″W
- Area: less than one acre
- Built: c. 1940
- Built by: Mark Guinn
- MPS: Dip That Tick:Texas Tick Fever Eradication in Arkansas MPS
- NRHP reference No.: 06000465
- Added to NRHP: June 7, 2006

The Guinn Dipping Vat is a historic former cattle dipping facility in Ouachita National Forest, northwest of Mount Ida, Arkansas in the ghost town of Mauldin. It is located south of Forest Road 37 west of United States Route 270.

Description: It is a U-shaped concrete structure with a concrete and stone drip pad at one end, and is covered with boards.

History : The vat was built c. 1940 by Mack Guinn to serve the local farm population in its efforts to eradicate Texas tick fever.

The vat was listed on the National Register of Historic Places in 2006.

== See also ==
- Cogburn Dipping Vat
- National Register of Historic Places listings in Montgomery County, Arkansas
