= Black Springs, Arkansas =

- Town
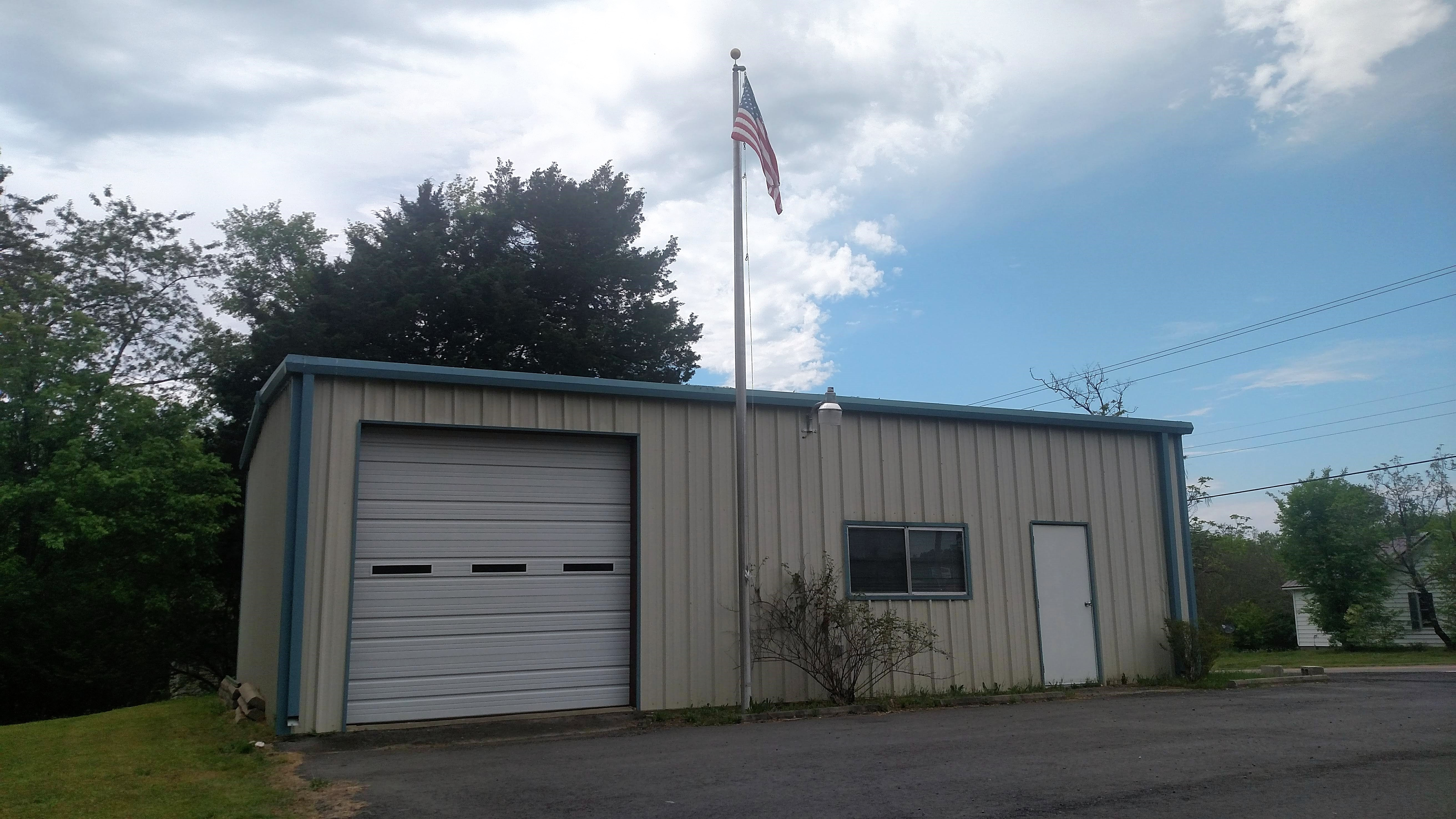
- Black Springs Community Center

- Location in Montgomery County, Arkansas
- Coordinates: 34°27′40″N 93°42′44″W
- Country: United States
- State: Arkansas
- County: Montgomery

Area
  - Total: 0.45 sq mi (1.16 km^{2})
  - Land: 0.44 sq mi (1.15 km^{2})
  - Water: 0.0039 sq mi (0.01 km^{2})
- Elevation: 784 ft (239 m)

Population (2020)
  - Total: 96
  - Estimate (2025): 91 ▼
  - Density: 215.6/sq mi (83.26/km^{2})
- Time zone: UTC-6 (Central (CST))
  - Summer (DST): UTC-5 (CDT)
- ZIP Code: 71960 (Norman)
- FIPS code: 05-06730
- GNIS feature ID: 2405274

Black Springs is a town in Montgomery County, Arkansas, United States. The population was 96 at the 2020 census.

== Geography ==
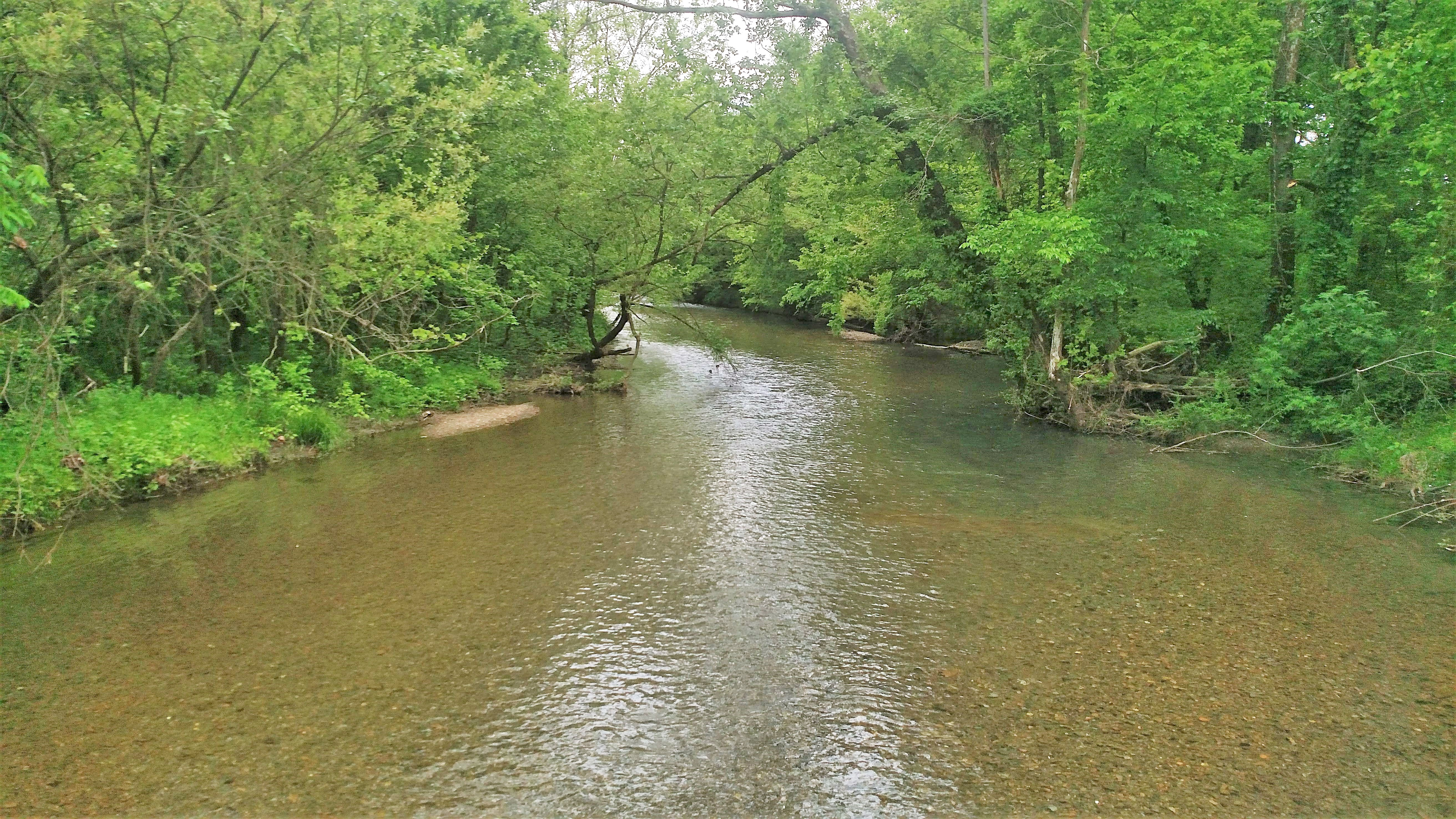
The Caddo River runs just to the south of Black Springs.

Black Springs is located in southwestern Montgomery County. Arkansas Highway 8 passes through the town, leading east 2 miles (3 km) to Norman and west through the Ouachita Mountains 35 miles (56 km) to Mena.

According to the United States Census Bureau, the town has a total area of 0.45 square miles (1.17 km^{2}), of which 0.002 square miles (0.005 km^{2}), or 0.44%, are water. The town lies on a low ridge between the Caddo River to the south and a tributary, Lick Creek, to the north. The Caddo is a southeast-flowing tributary of the Ouachita River.

== Demographics ==
Historical population
Census	Pop.	Note	%±
1880	67		—
1940	97		—
1970	72		—
1980	92		27.8%
1990	97		5.4%
2000	114		17.5%
2010	99		−13.2%
2020	96		−3.0%
2025 (est.)	91	▼	−5.2%
U.S. Decennial Census; 2014 Estimate

As of the census of 2000, there were 114 people, 46 households, and 33 families residing in the town. The population density was 102.4 people/km^{2} (265 people/mi^{2}). There were 52 housing units at an average density of 46.7 units/km^{2} (121 units/mi^{2}). The racial makeup of the town was 97.37% White, and 2.63% from two or more races.

There were 46 households, out of which 28.3% had children under the age of 18 living with them, 65.2% were married couples living together, 4.3% had a female householder with no husband present, and 26.1% were non-families. 19.6% of all households were made up of individuals, and 17.4% had someone living alone who was 65 years of age or older. The average household size was 2.48 and the average family size was 2.82.

In the town, the population was spread out, with 25.4% under the age of 18, 2.6% from 18 to 24, 30.7% from 25 to 44, 13.2% from 45 to 64, and 28.1% who were 65 years of age or older. The median age was 40 years. For every 100 females, there were 111.1 males. For every 100 females age 18 and over, there were 107.3 males.

The median income for a household in the town was $27,000, and the median income for a family was $25,250. Males had a median income of $26,875 versus $15,625 for females. The per capita income for the town was $12,312. There were 16.1% of families and 23.7% of the population living below the poverty line, including 34.8% of under eighteens and 10.3% of those over 64.

== Government ==
Town government in Arkansas is divided into a mayor, a board of five aldermen, and a recorder-treasurer. Board meetings are held on the second Tuesday of each month at the Black Springs Community Center.

=== Politics ===
In Congress, Arkansas has been represented by two Republican senators (John Boozman and Tom Cotton) since January 3, 2015, ending a long history of Democratic hegemony. In the House of Representatives, Black Springs and Montgomery County is within the Arkansas 4th district, which contains almost the entire southwestern half of the state. The Arkansas 4th has been represented by Bruce Westerman since 2015.

In the Arkansas Senate, Black Springs is within the 10th District. The district encompasses almost all of the Ouachita Mountain counties. The 10th has been represented by Larry Teague (D) of Nashville since 2013. In the Arkansas House of Representatives, Black Springs is within the 20th District, which contains Montgomery, Polk, and Sevier counties. The 20th has been represented by John Maddox (R) of Mena since 2017.

== Education ==
It is in the Caddo Hills School District.

== Infrastructure ==
=== Utilities ===
Entergy Arkansas is the sole provider of electricity in almost all of Montgomery County, including Black Springs.

== Notable people ==
- Boyd Anderson Tackett, U.S. Representative for Arkansas's 4th congressional district from 1949 to 1953
