= Womble District Administration House No. 1 =

Historic house in Arkansas, United States

- U.S. National Register of Historic Places
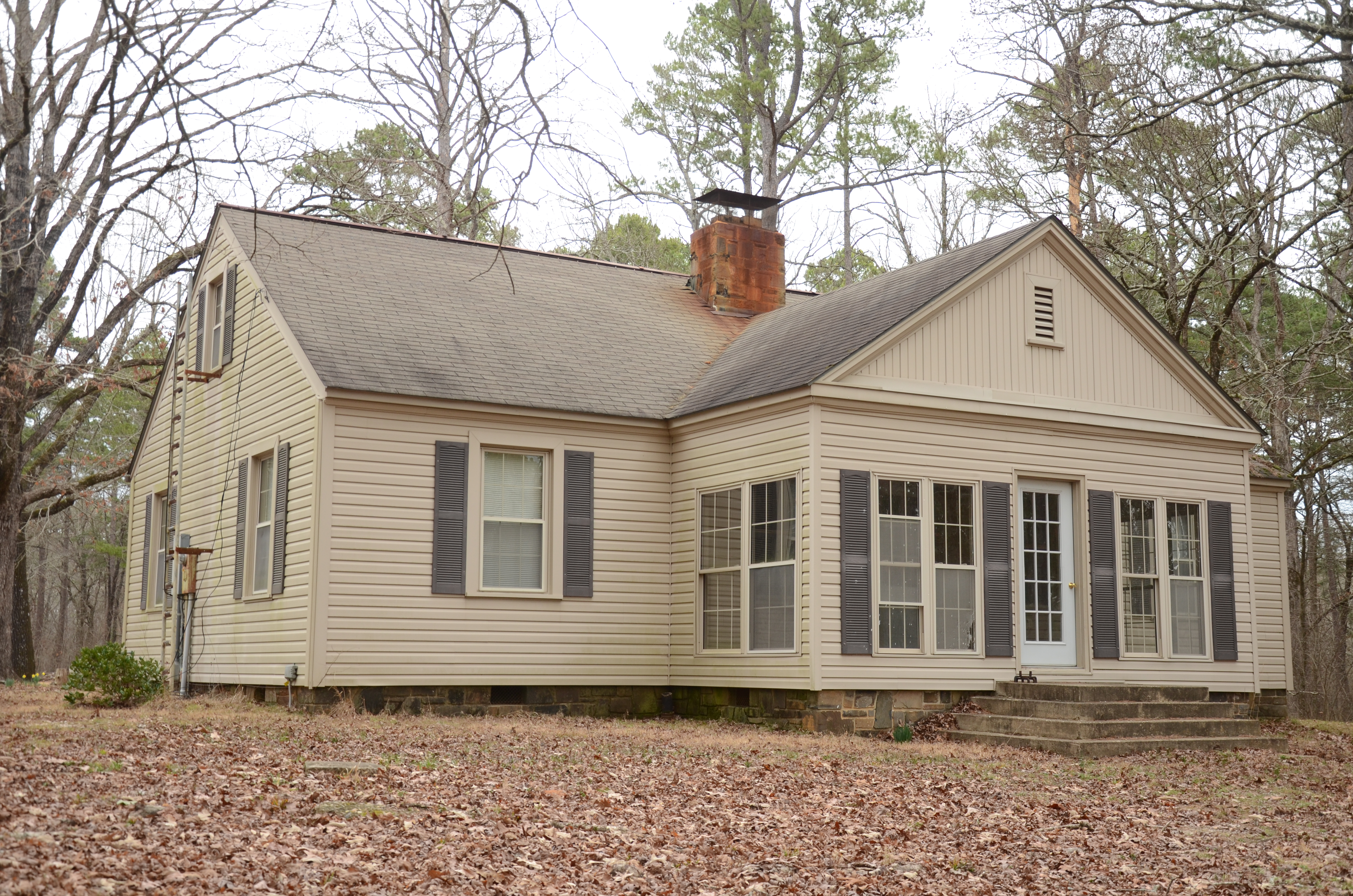

- Location within Arkansas Location within the United States
- Nearest city: Mt. Ida, Arkansas
- Coordinates: 34°32′22″N 93°36′9″W
- Area: less than one acre
- Built: 1940
- Architect: Civilian Conservation Corps
- Architectural style: Plain Traditional
- MPS: Facilities Constructed by the CCC in Arkansas MPS
- NRHP reference No.: 93001101
- Added to NRHP: October 20, 1993

The Womble District Administration House No. 1 is a historic house in the Ouachita National Forest. It is located on the north side of United States Route 270, east of Mount Ida and just west of the highway's crossing of Williams Stream. It is a 1 1/2-story wood-frame structure, with a side-gable roof, novelty siding, and stone foundation. Its main facade, facing south, has a projecting gable-roofed porch, whose gable is finished in vertical board-and-batten siding. It was built about 1940 by a crew of the Civilian Conservation Corps as the administrative headquarters of the Womble District of the national forest.

The house was listed on the National Register of Historic Places in 1993.

== See also ==
- National Register of Historic Places listings in Montgomery County, Arkansas
