= Reeves-Melson House =

Historic house in Arkansas, United States

- U.S. National Register of Historic Places
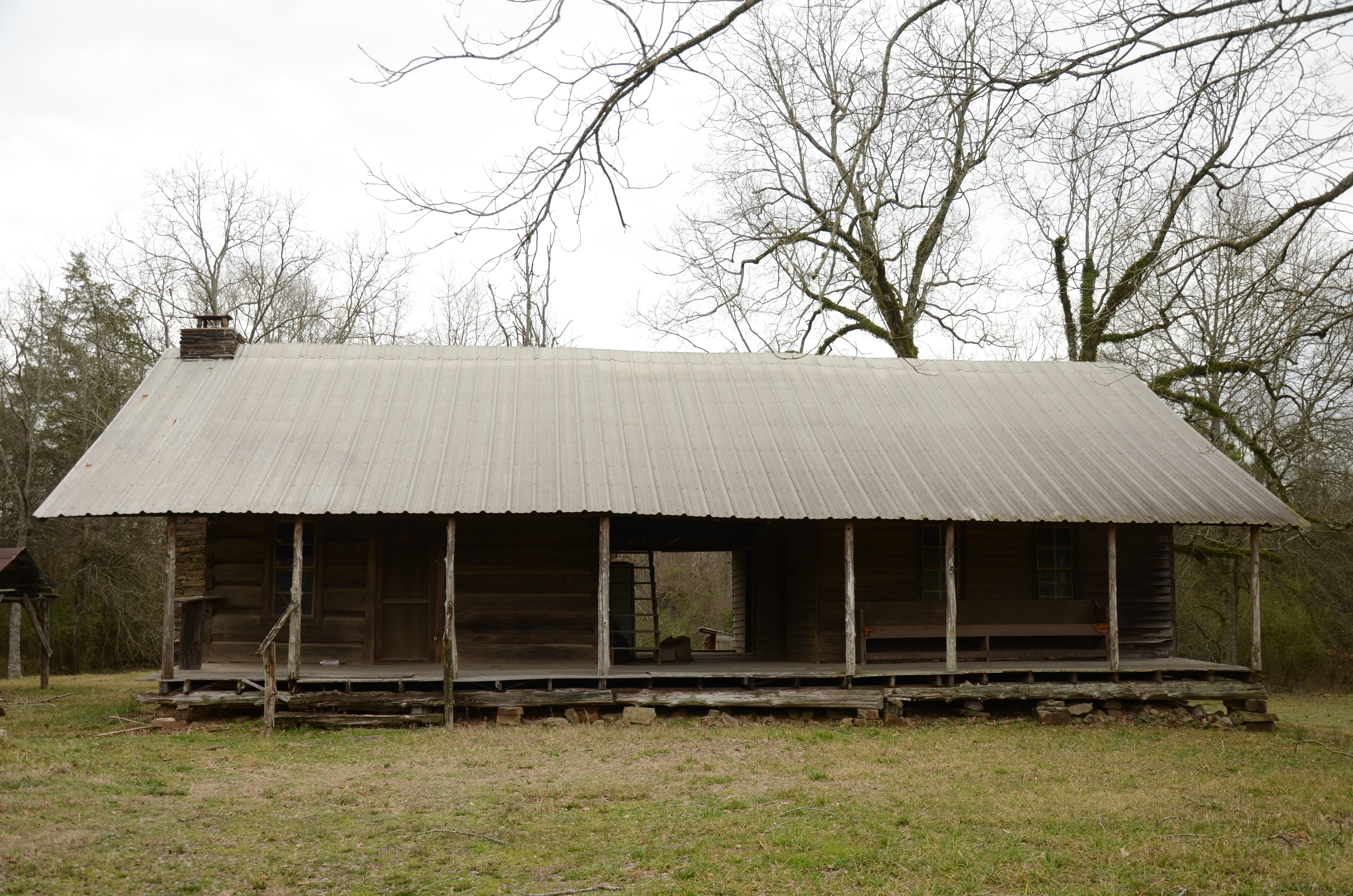

- Location within Arkansas Location within the United States
- Nearest city: Bonnerdale, Arkansas
- Coordinates: 34°26′9″N 93°24′37″W
- Area: less than one acre
- Built: 1882
- Built by: William H. Reeves, Larkin Melson
- Architectural style: Dogtrot plan
- NRHP reference No.: 85003069
- Added to NRHP: December 5, 1985

The Reeves-Melson House is a historic house in rural Montgomery County, Arkansas. It is a private inholding within Ouachita National Forest, located on the east side of Miles Road, north of Bonnerdale and east of Alamo. It is a single story dogtrot, with a log pen and a wooden frame pen separated by a breezeway under a gable roof. A shed-roof porch extends across the front, and the building is clad in weatherboard. The log pen has a trapdoor providing access to a dugout cellar, a feature not typically found in regional dogtrot houses. The log pen was built in 1882 by William Reeves, and the frame pen was built in 1888 by Larkin Melson.

The house was listed on the National Register of Historic Places in 1985.

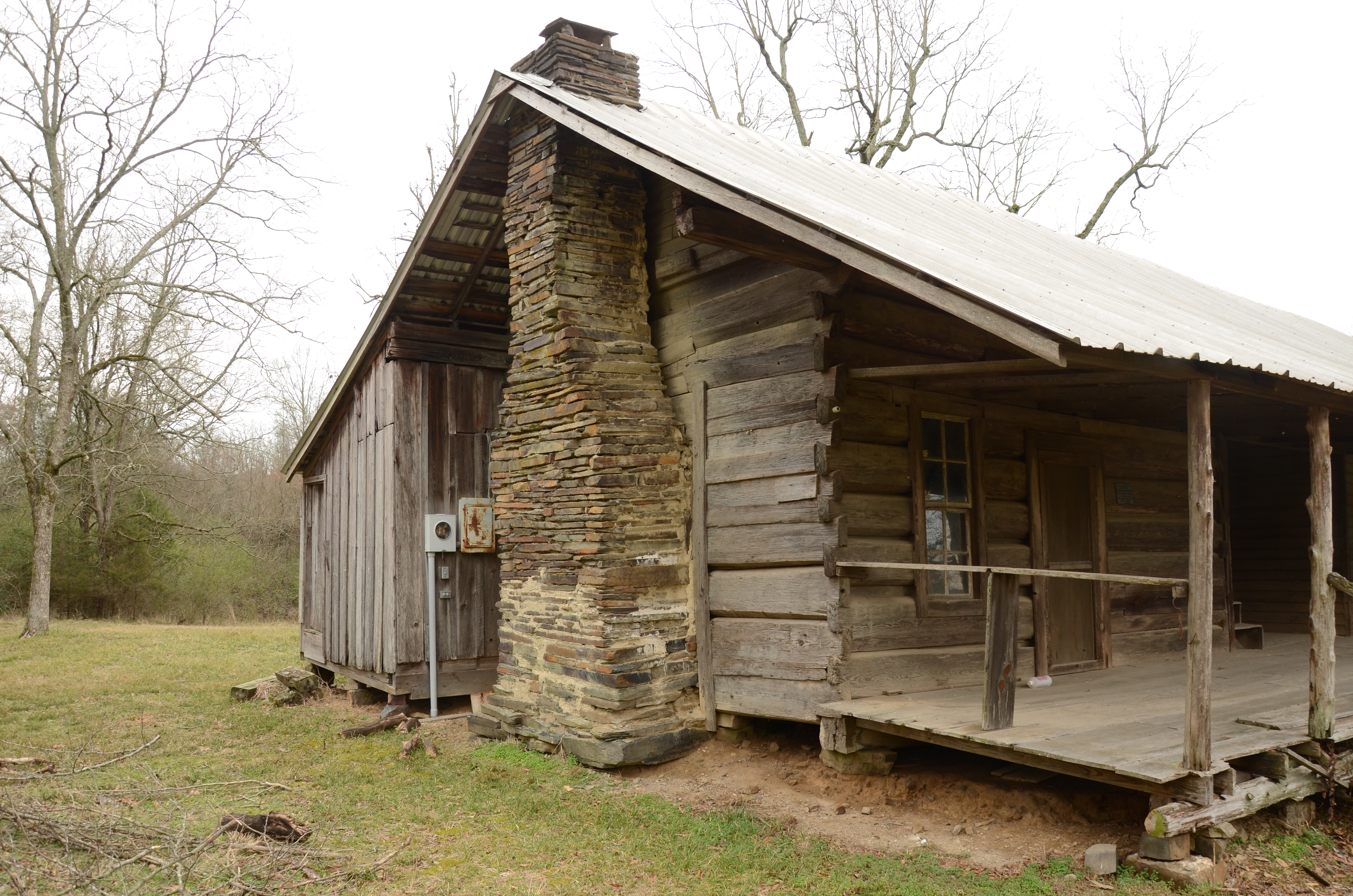
Image 2 of 9, 2016

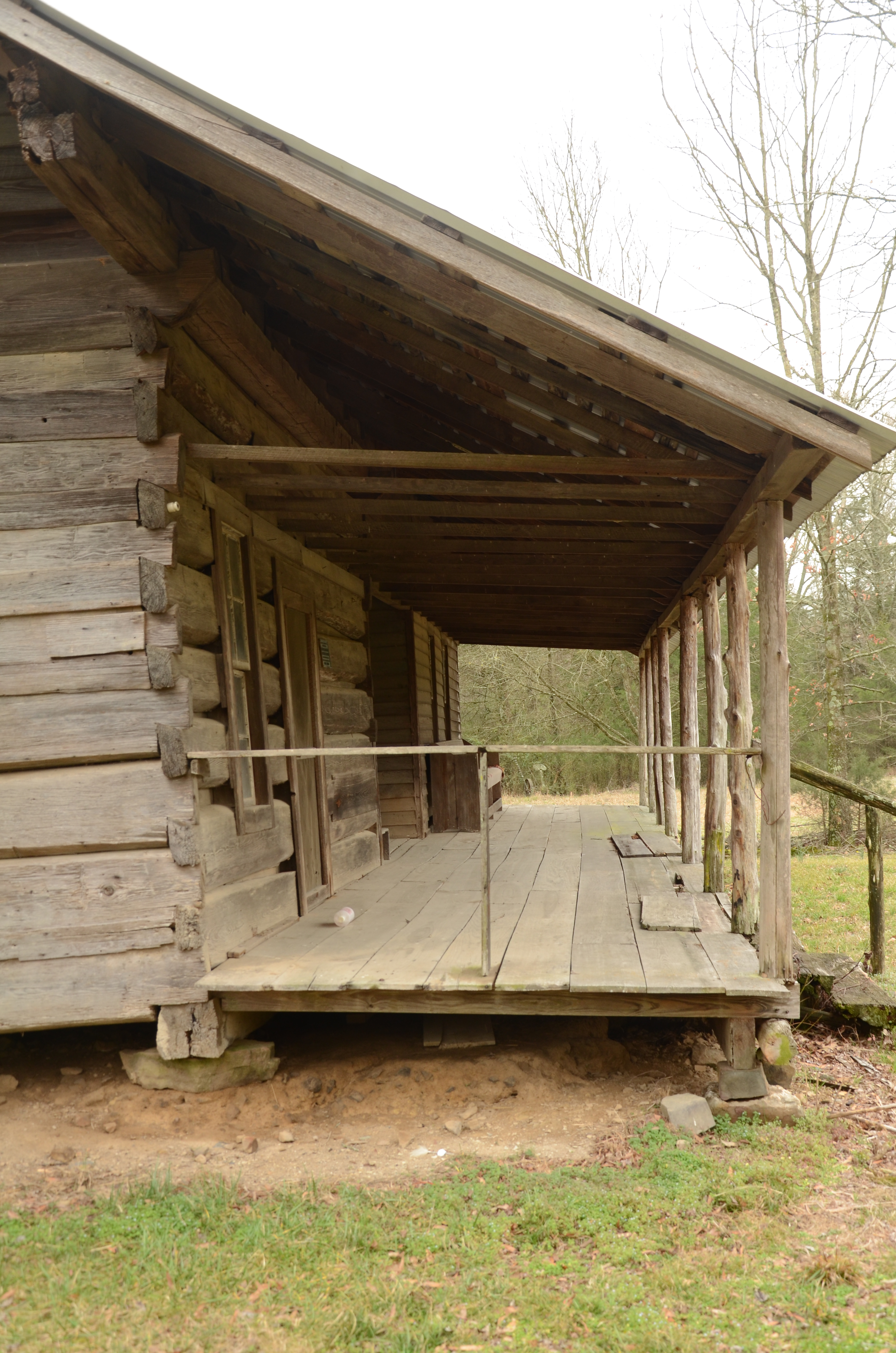
Image 3 of 9, 2016

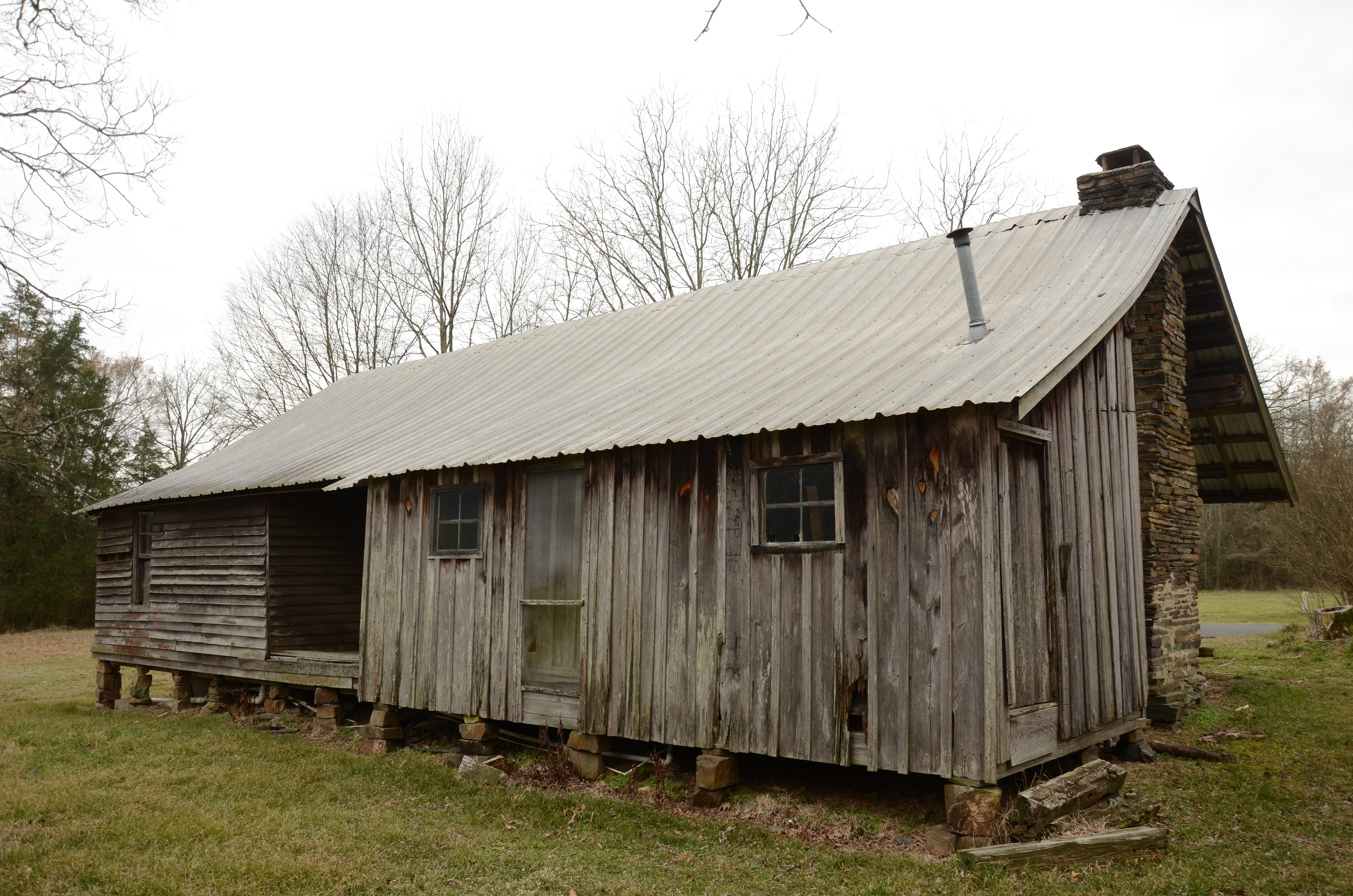
Image 4 of 9, 2016

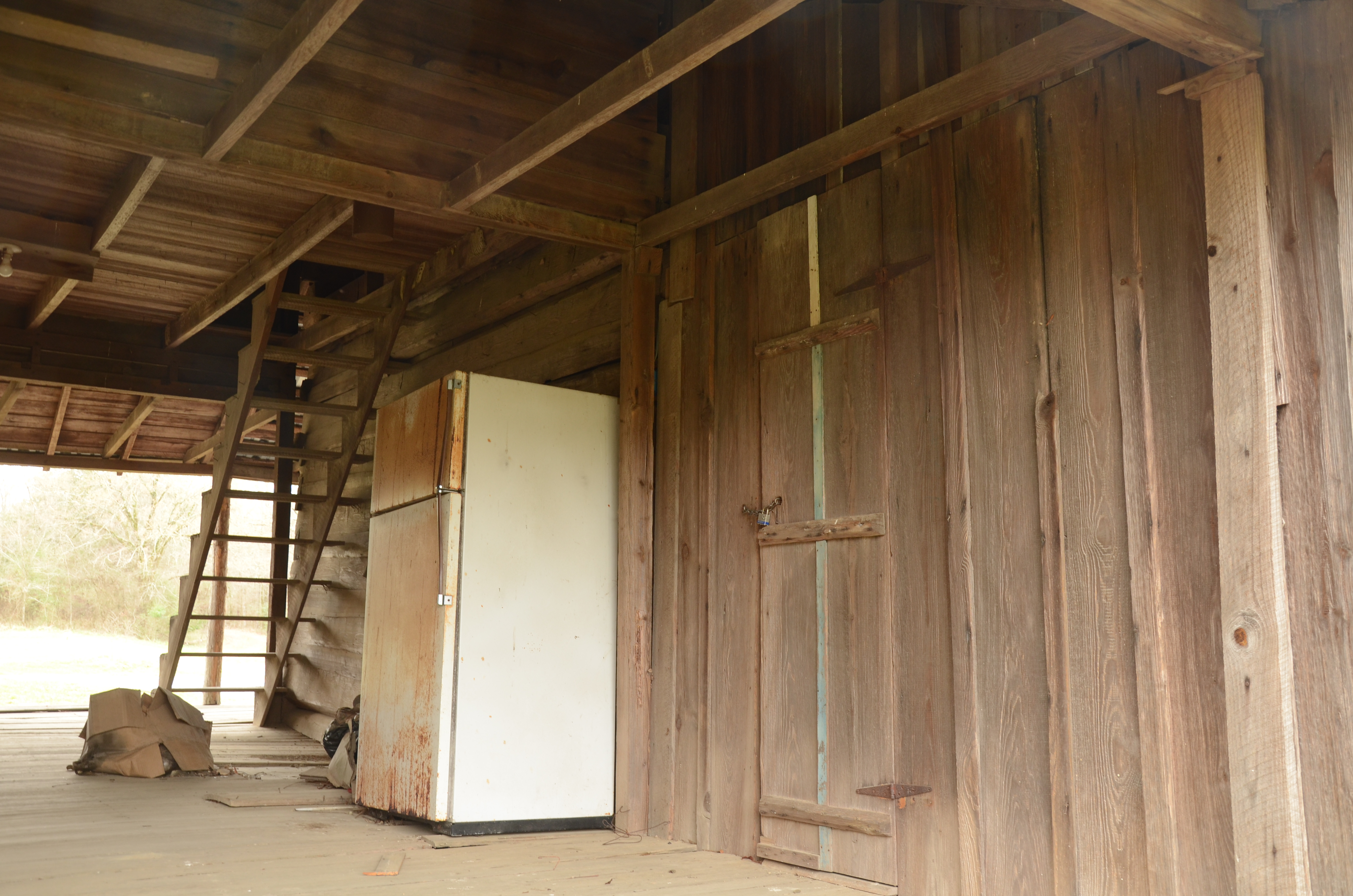
Image 5 of 9, 2016

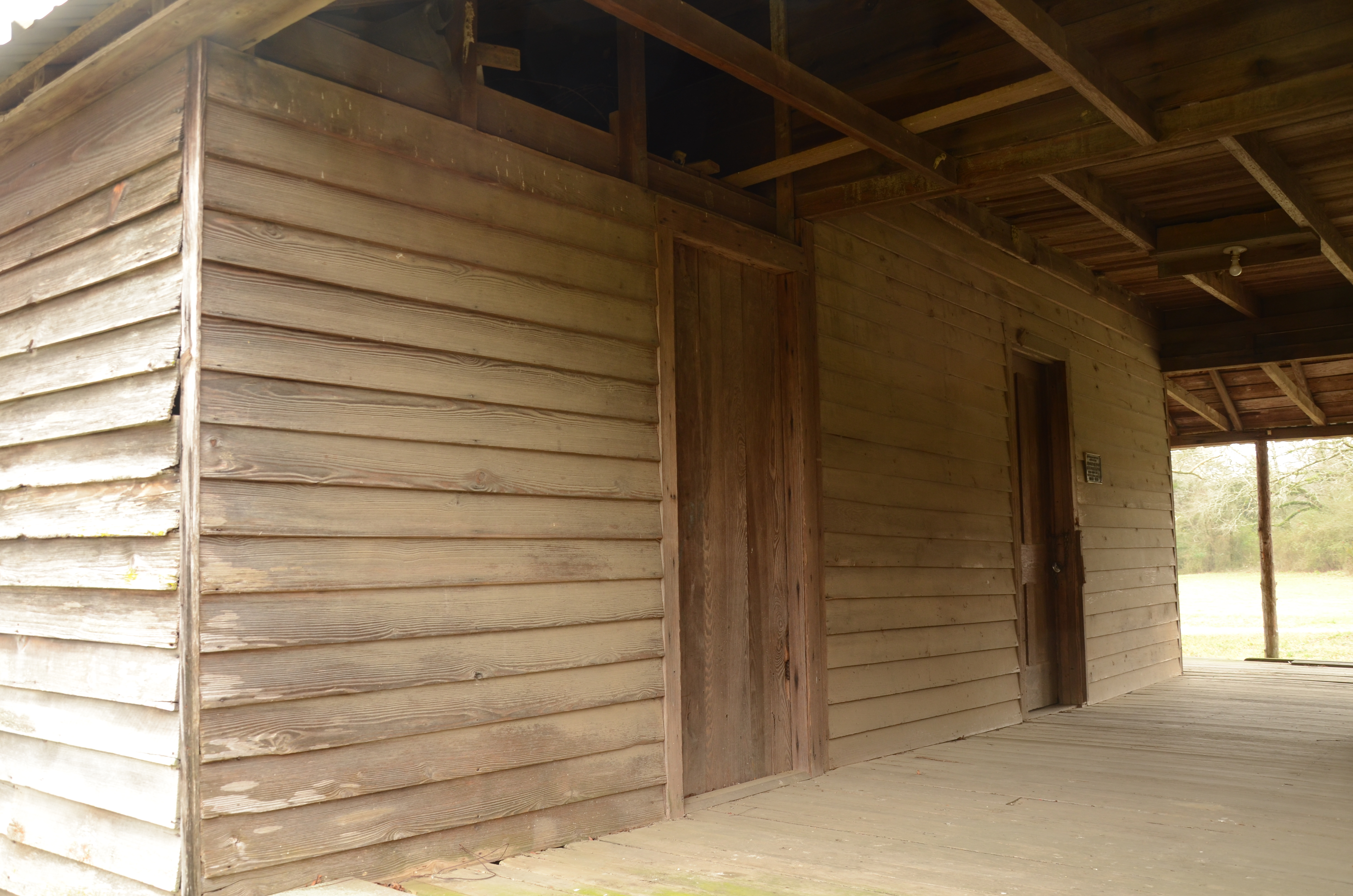
Image 6 of 9, 2016

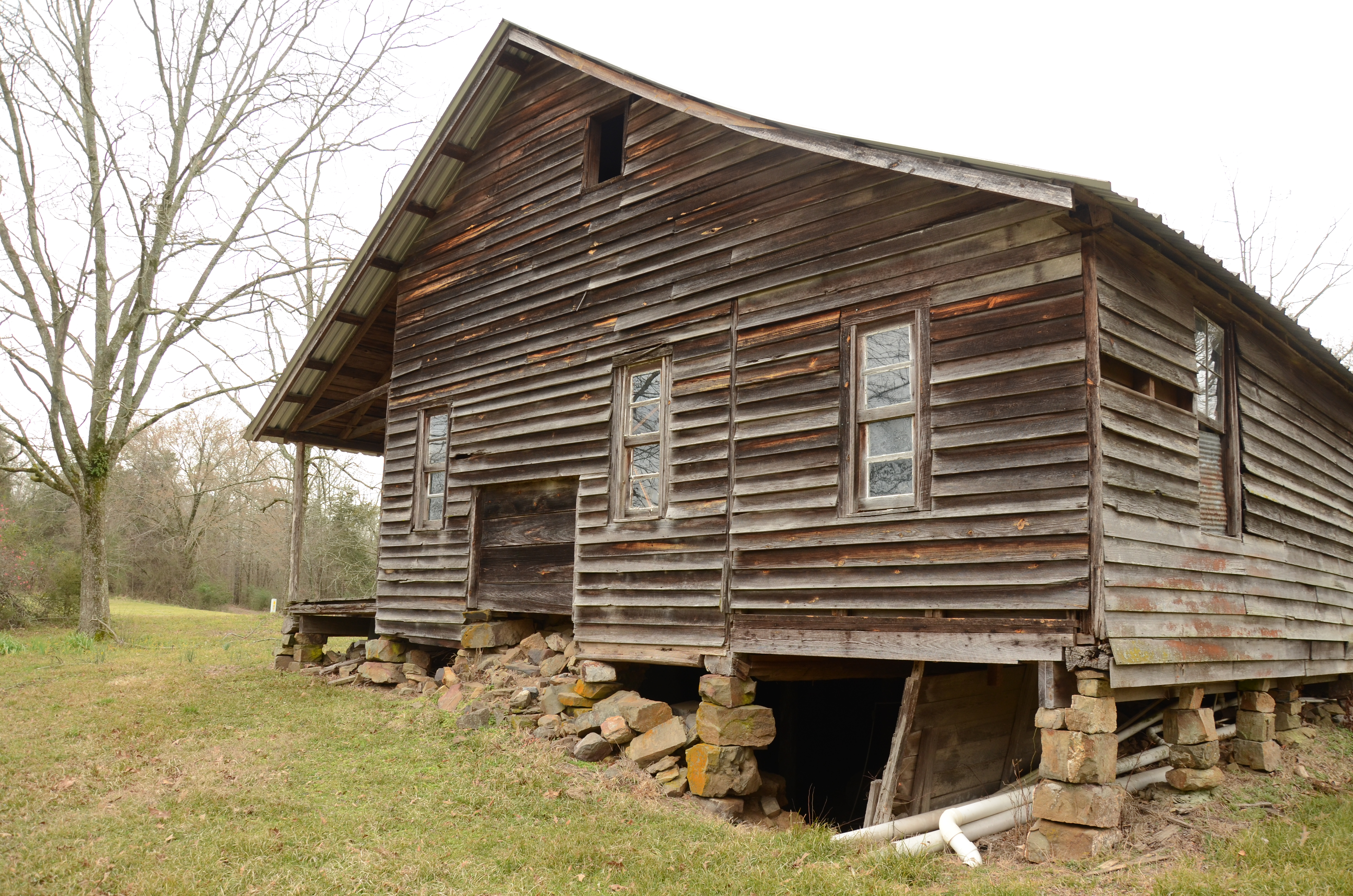
Image 7 of 9, 2016

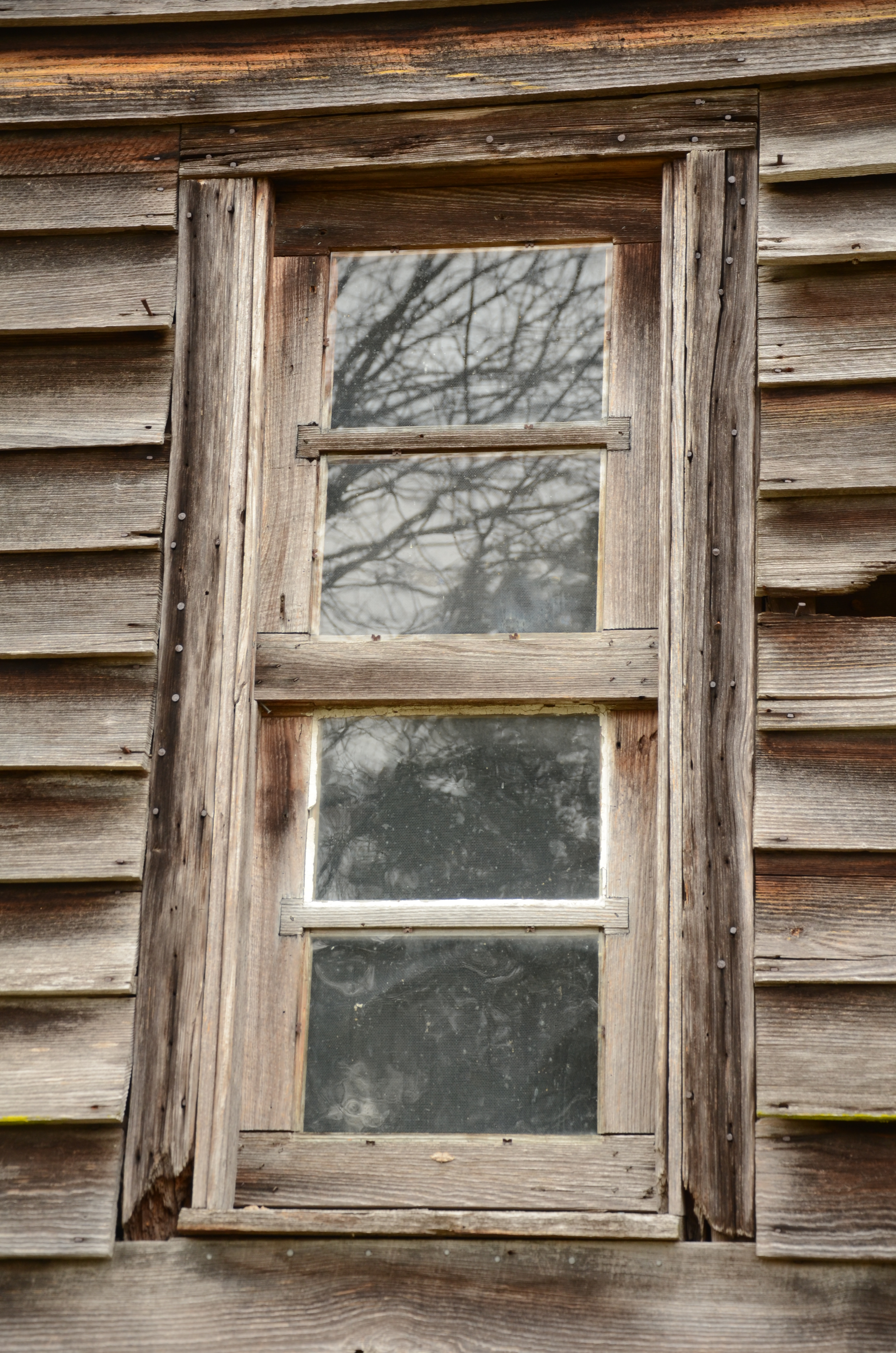
Image 8 of 9, 2016

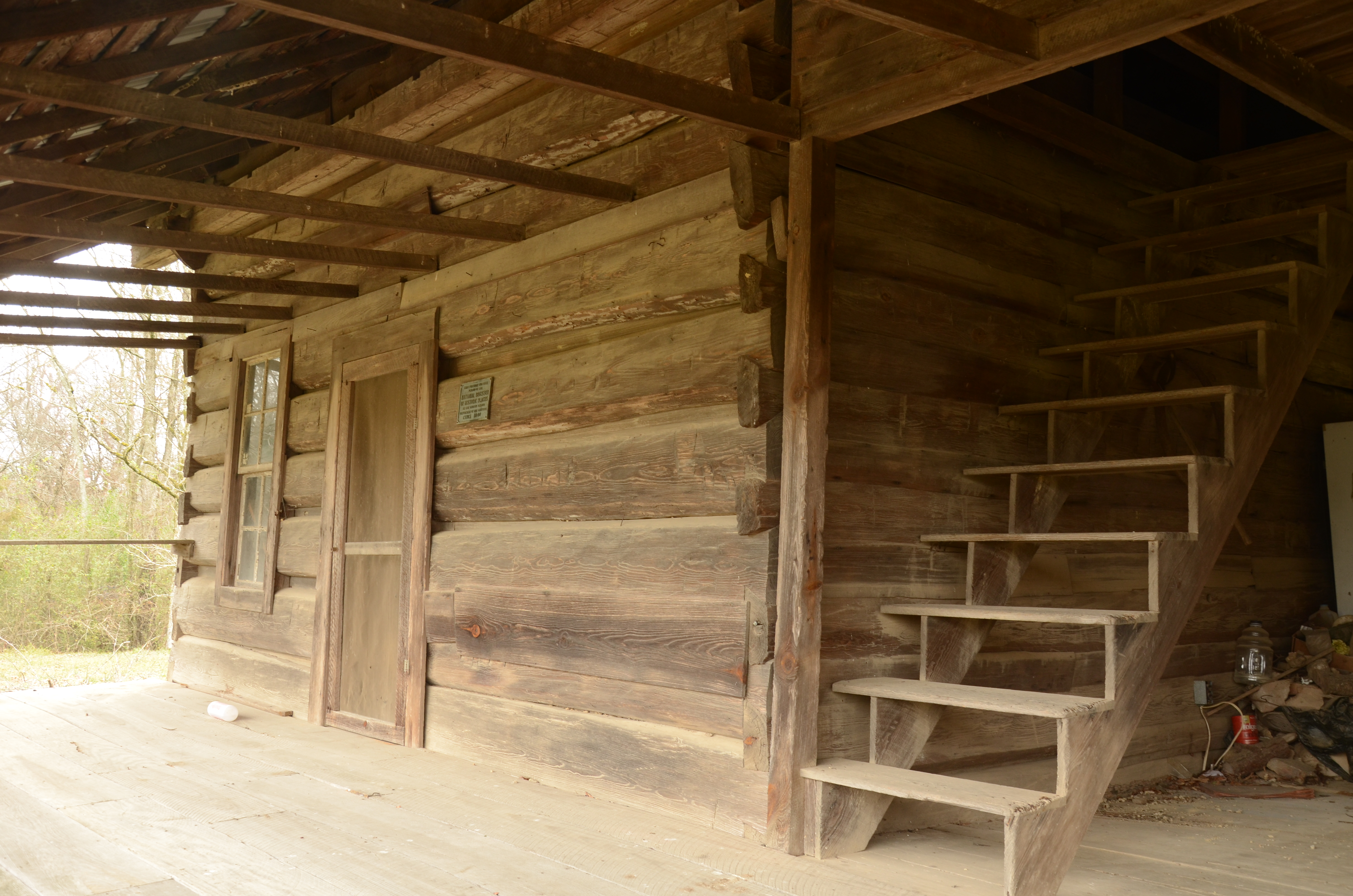
Image 9 of 9, 2016

== See also ==
- National Register of Historic Places listings in Montgomery County, Arkansas
