= Caddo Hills High School =

Location
- 2268 AR 8 East; Norman, Arkansas 71960; United States; 34°25′10″N 93°37′51″W

Information
- School type: Public comprehensive
- Established: 1971 (55 years ago)
- Status: Open
- School district: Caddo Hills School District
- CEEB code: 041845
- NCES School ID: 050377000127
- Principal: Justin Neel
- Teaching staff: 29.12 (on FTE basis)
- Grades: 7–12
- Enrollment: 254 (2023-2024)
- Student to teacher ratio: 8.72
- Education system: ADE Smart Core
- Classes offered: Regular, Advanced Placement (AP)
- Colors: Red, white, and blue
- Athletics: Golf, cross country, basketball, baseball, softball, track, cheer
- Athletics conference: 1A 7 West
- Mascot: Indians
- Team name: Caddo Hills Indians
- Accreditation: ADE
- Yearbook: The Warrior
- Website: ca.caddohills.org

Caddo Hills High School (CHHS) is a nationally recognized public high school located in the rural community of Norman, Arkansas, United States. The school provides comprehensive secondary education for more than 250 students each year in grades 7 through 12. It is one of three public high schools in Montgomery County and the only high school administered by the Caddo Hills School District. The main high school building was completed in 1973 with several additions to the campus over the past several years.

== Academics ==
CHHS is accredited by the Arkansas Department of Education (ADE). The assumed course of study follows the Smart Core curriculum developed by the ADE. Students complete regular (core and elective) and career focus coursework and exams and may take Advanced Placement (AP) courses and exams with the opportunity to receive college credit.

== Athletics ==
The Caddo Hills High School mascot and athletic emblem is the Indians with red, white and blue serving as the school colors.

The Caddo Hills Indians compete in interscholastic activities within the 1A Classification via the 1A 7 West Conference as administered by the Arkansas Activities Association. The Indians participate in golf (boys/girls), cross country (boys/girls), basketball (boys/girls), cheer, dance, baseball, softball, and track and field (boys/girls).

- Basketball: The Senior Boys basketball team won the Class A state title in 1990 with the senior girls following in 1993 and 1997.
- Cross country: The girls cross country team won a state cross country championship title in 1988. The boys cross country squads won consecutive state championships in 2010, 2011, and 2012.
