= Arkansas Research and Test Station =

- Arkansas Research and Test Station (ARTS)
- U.S. National Register of Historic Places
- Location within Arkansas Location within the United States
- Nearest city: Caddo Gap, Arkansas
- Coordinates: 34°22′12.4″N 93°39′57″W
- Area: Less than 1 acre (0.40 ha)
- Built: 1965
- Built by: Hughes Space Systems Division
- NRHP reference No.: 100001650
- Added to NRHP: September 21, 2017

The Arkansas Research and Test Station or ARTS, is a historic satellite ground station in the hills of Montgomery County, Arkansas. It was built in 1965 by the Space Systems Division of the Hughes Aircraft Company, and operated until 1969. It includes a paraboloid antenna 85 feet (26 m) in diameter and a utilitarian control building located nearby. It is the only surviving ground station from that period capable of sending and receiving communications with a satellite; the only other one ever built, located in Andover, Maine, has had its antenna dismantled.

The property was listed on the National Register of Historic Places in 2017.

== See also ==
- National Register of Historic Places listings in Montgomery County, Arkansas
