= Effiegene Wingo =

American politician (1883–1962)

Effiegene Locke Wingo
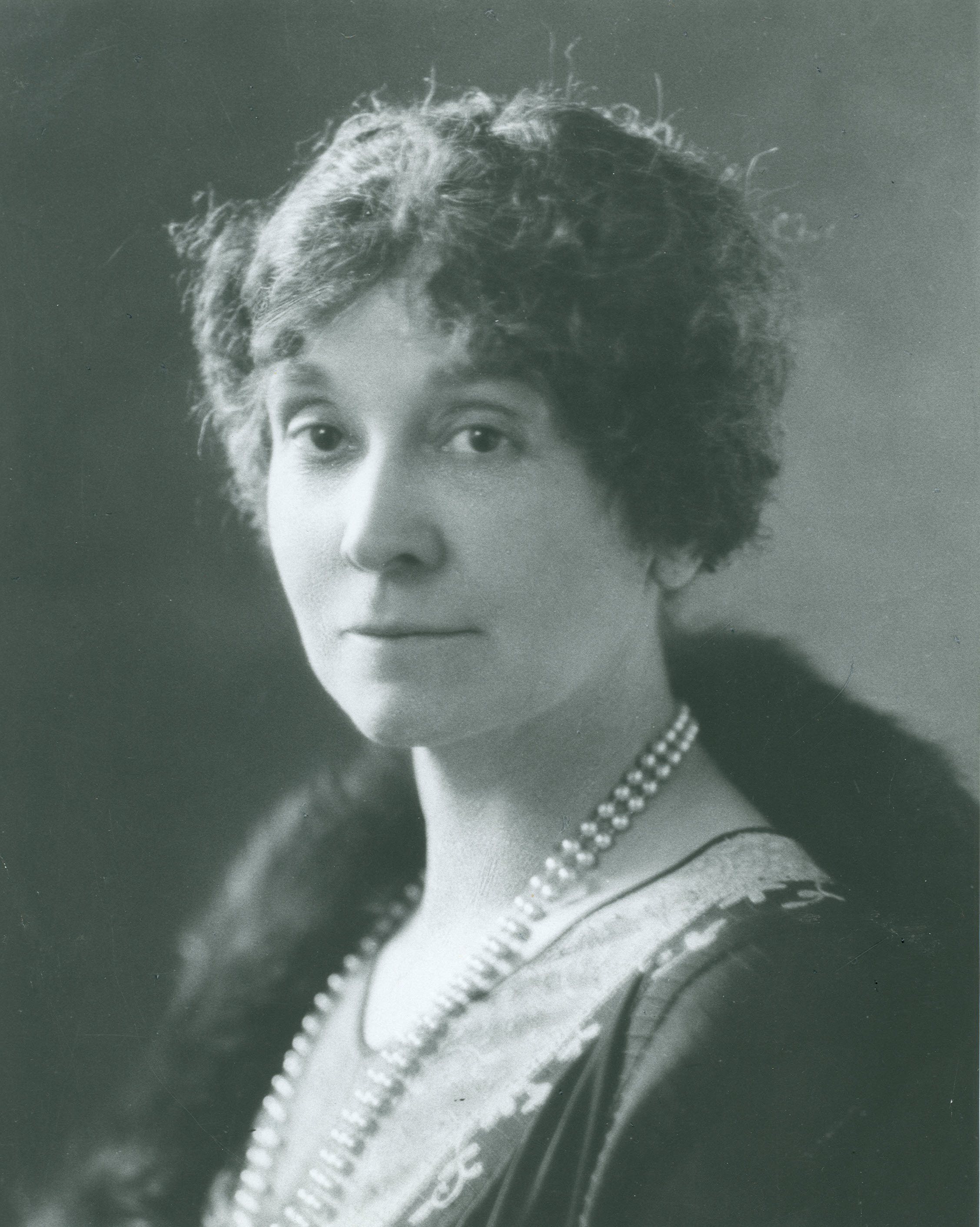

Member of the U.S. House of Representatives from Arkansas's 4th district
- In office November 4, 1930 – March 3, 1933
- Preceded by: Otis Wingo
- Succeeded by: William B. Cravens

Personal details
- Born: April 13, 1883 Lockesburg, Arkansas, U.S.
- Died: September 19, 1962 (aged 79) Burlington, Ontario, Canada
- Resting place: Rock Creek Cemetery; Washington, D.C., U.S.
- Party: Democratic
- Spouse: Otis Theodore Wingo
- Education: Union Female College; Maddox Seminary

Effiegene Wingo (née Locke; April 13, 1883 – September 19, 1962) was a U.S. representative from Arkansas, wife of Otis Theodore Wingo and great-great-great-granddaughter of Matthew Locke.

Born in Lockesburg in Sevier County in southwestern Arkansas, Wingo attended public and private schools and Union Female College in Oxford, Mississippi. She graduated in 1901 from Maddox Seminary in Little Rock. She lived in Little Rock and Texarkana, Arkansas, before establishing her permanent residence in De Queen in Sevier County.

Wingo was elected as a Democrat on November 4, 1930, to the 71st Congress to fill the vacancy caused by her husband's death, and on the same day was elected to the 72nd Congress and served from November 4, 1930, to March 3, 1933. She was not a candidate for renomination in 1932. Osro Cobb, then a Republican member of the Arkansas House of Representatives and later the United States Attorney for the Eastern District of Arkansas, was urged by his party to challenge Wingo for the congressional vacancy, but he instead endorsed the Democrat. In a statement, Cobb said that Wingo "is eminently qualified to fill the position left by her late husband, and I would not under any circumstances oppose her in the general election."

In 1934, Wingo co-founded the National Institute of Public Affairs in Washington, D.C. She also engaged in educational and research work. Wingo died September 19, 1962, in Burlington, Ontario, Canada, while visiting a son. She is interred along with her husband at Rock Creek Cemetery in Washington, D.C.

== See also ==
- Women in the United States House of Representatives

U.S. House of Representatives
Preceded by Otis Wingo	Member of the U.S. House of Representatives from Arkansas's 4th congressional district 1930–1933	Succeeded by William B. Cravens
