= Boyd Tackett =

American politician (1911–1985)

Boyd Anderson Tackett

Member of the U.S. House of Representatives from Arkansas's 4th district
- In office January 3, 1949 – January 3, 1953
- Preceded by: William Fadjo Cravens
- Succeeded by: Oren Harris

Member of the Arkansas House of Representatives
- In office 1937–1941

Personal details
- Born: May 9, 1911 Black Springs, Arkansas, US
- Died: February 23, 1985 (aged 73) Nashville, Arkansas, US
- Resting place: Restland Memorial Park in Nashville, Arkansas
- Party: Democratic
- Education: Arkansas Tech University Ouachita Baptist University University of Arkansas School of Law
- Occupation: Attorney

Military service
- Branch/service: United States Army
- Rank: Corporal in United States Army Signal Corps

Boyd Anderson Tackett (May 9, 1911 – February 23, 1985) was a U.S. representative from Arkansas.

== Biography ==
Tackett was born near Black Springs in Montgomery County in southwestern Arkansas. He moved with his parents to Glenwood, Arkansas, and attended public school; afterwards, he matriculated at Arkansas Polytechnic College at Russellville (1930–1932), continued at Ouachita College in Arkadelphia (1932–1933), and graduated in 1935 from the University of Arkansas School of Law at Fayetteville.

After being admitted to the bar, Tackett practiced law in Glenwood, Murfreesboro, and Nashville, Arkansas, until he was elected in 1936 to the Arkansas House of Representatives. He also served as the prosecuting attorney of the 9th Judicial Circuit of Arkansas until 1943, when he enlisted in the United States Army. Tackett served as a corporal in the Signal Corps until his discharge in 1944, when he resumed his law practice in Nashville.

In 1948, Tackett was elected as a member of the U.S. House of Representatives from Arkansas's 4th Congressional District as a Democrat to the 81st and 82nd Congresses. He did not seek reelection to the House in 1952 but instead lost his bid for the Democratic gubernatorial nomination to Francis Cherry. Tackett returned to Texarkana and his law practice, where he remained until retirement in 1980.

Tackett lived again in Nashville, Arkansas, from 1983 until his death two years later. He was interred there at Restland Memorial Park.

U.S. House of Representatives
Preceded by William Fadjo Cravens	Member of the U.S. House of Representatives from Arkansas's 4th congressional district 1949–1953	Succeeded by Oren Harris
