= Collier Springs Picnic Area =

- Collier Springs Shelter
- U.S. National Register of Historic Places
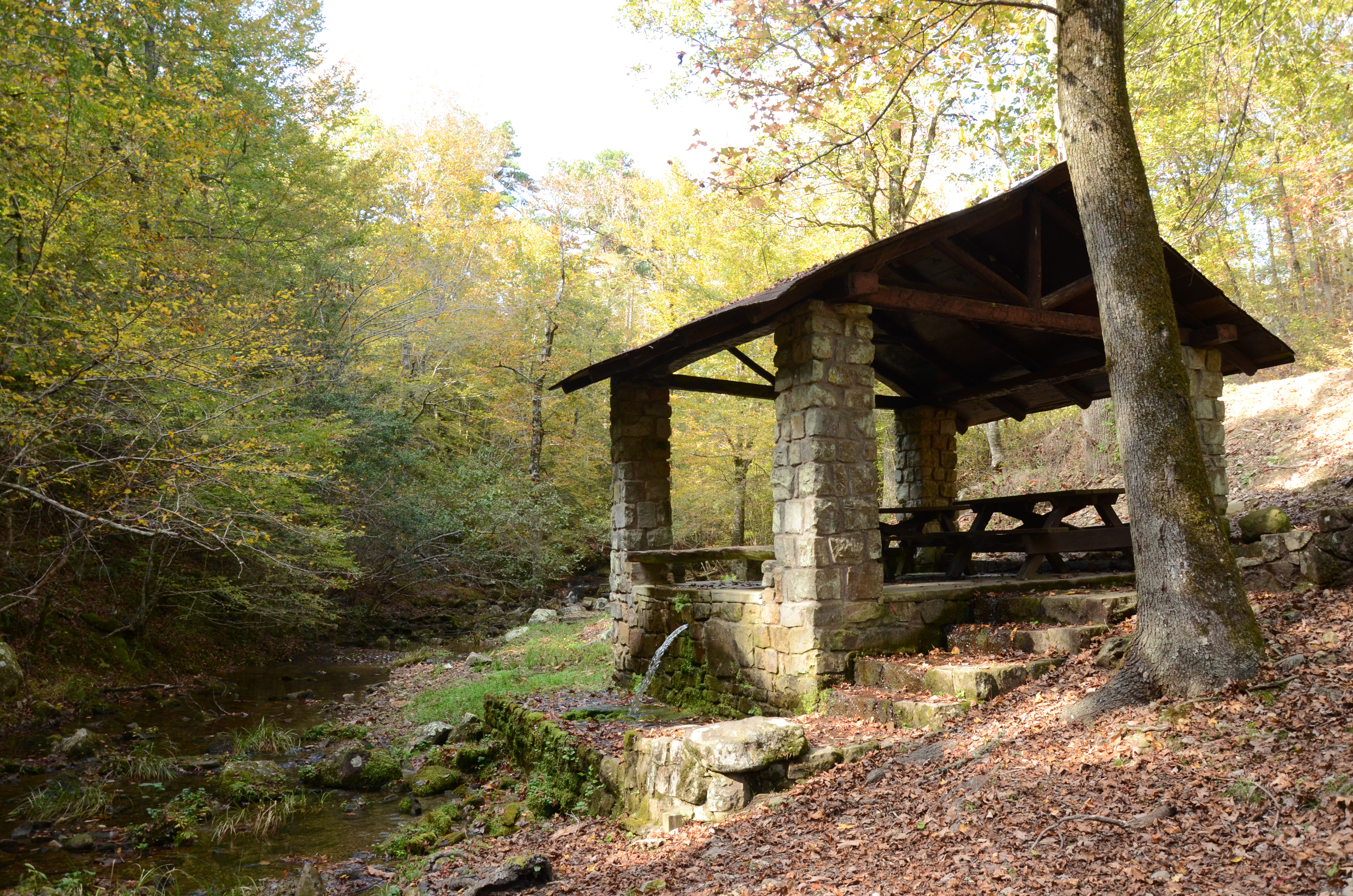

- Location within Arkansas Location within the United States
- Nearest city: Norman, Arkansas
- Coordinates: 34°29′1″N 93°35′33″W
- Area: less than one acre
- Built: 1939
- Built by: Civilian Conservation Corps
- Architectural style: Rustic
- MPS: Facilities Constructed by the CCC in Arkansas MPS
- NRHP reference No.: 93001083
- Added to NRHP: October 20, 1993

The Collier Springs Picnic Area is located on Forest Road 177 in Ouachita National Forest, northeast of Norman, Arkansas. The picnic area is notable for the presence of the Collier Springs Shelter, which was built by crews of the Civilian Conservation Corps in 1939. It is a rectangular open-air stone structure, with stone columns topped by hewn log beams that support the gabled roof. The shelter also acts as a protective cover for the eponymous spring, which is fed via a pipe to the nearby creek. Facilities at the picnic area also include a vault toilet.

== See also ==
- National Register of Historic Places listings in Montgomery County, Arkansas
