= Caddo Hills School District =

School district in Arkansas

Location
- 2268 Hwy 8 East; Norman, Arkansas 71960 United States

District information
- Grades: PK–12
- Established: 1971
- Accreditation: Arkansas Department of Education
- Schools: 2
- NCES District ID: 0503770

Students and staff
- Students: 601
- Teachers: 50.47 (on FTE basis)
- Staff: 108.47 (on FTE basis)
- Student–teacher ratio: 11.91
- Athletic conference: 1A Region 4 West (2012–14)
- District mascot: Indian
- Colors: Red; White; Blue

Other information
- Website: www.caddohills.org

Caddo Hills School District 28 is a public school district based in unincorporated Montgomery County, Arkansas, United States, with a Norman mailing address. The district encompasses 320.04 square miles (828.9 km^{2}) of land of Montgomery County, including all or portions of the municipalities of Norman and Black Springs, along with small pieces of Glenwood. It also includes unincorporated areas of Caddo Gap.

The district was formed in 1971 when the Norman and Caddo Gap School Districts consolidated. In the 1971–72 and 1972–73 school years, high school classes were held at the old Norman High School. In 1973, a new high school was built on land between the two communities on Highway 8. In 1974, the Caddo Hills Elementary School was opened at the same location. Both the high school and elementary buildings have had several additions built on in the last 40 years. The district's gymnasium was built in 1984-85.

== Schools ==
- Caddo Hills High School, serving more than 250 students in grades 7 through 12
- Caddo Hills Elementary School, serving more than 300 students in prekindergarten through grade 6
