= William B. Cravens =

American politician (1872–1939)

William Ben Cravens
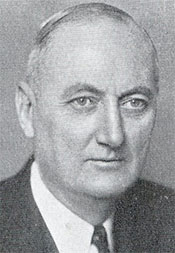

Member of the U.S. House of Representatives from Arkansas's 4th district
- In office March 4, 1933 – January 13, 1939
- Preceded by: Effiegene L. Wingo
- Succeeded by: William F. Cravens
- In office March 4, 1907 – March 3, 1913
- Preceded by: John S. Little
- Succeeded by: Otis Wingo

Personal details
- Born: January 17, 1872 Fort Smith, Arkansas, U.S.
- Died: January 13, 1939 (aged 66) Washington, D.C., U.S.
- Party: Democratic
- Spouse: Carolyn Dyal Cravens
- Children: William Fadjo Cravens
- Education: University of Missouri

William Ben Cravens (January 17, 1872 – January 13, 1939) was an American politician and a U.S. representative from Arkansas, father of William Fadjo Cravens and cousin of Jordan Edgar Cravens.

== Biography ==
Cravens was born in Fort Smith, Arkansas, son of William Murphy and Mary Eloise (Rutherford) Cravens. He attended the common schools, Louisville Military Academy in Kentucky, and Staunton Military Academy in Virginia. He graduated from the law department of the University of Missouri in 1893, and was married to Carolyn Dyal on December 19, 1895.

== Career ==
Cravens was admitted to the bar in Arkansas in 1893, and commenced practice in Fort Smith, Arkansas. From 1898 until 1902 he was City attorney of Fort Smith, and the prosecuting attorney for the twelfth judicial district of Arkansas from 1902 until 1908.

Cravens was elected as a Democrat to the Sixtieth, Sixty-first, and Sixty-second Congresses and served from March 4, 1907 until March 3, 1913. He was not a candidate for reelection in 1912 to the Sixty-third Congress. After serving in Congress he resumed the practice of law.

Again elected to the Seventy-third and to the three succeeding Congresses, Cravens also served from March 4, 1933, until his death. His son William Fadjo Cravens of Arkansas, was elected to the Seventy-Sixth Congress, to fill the term of his vacancy.

== Death ==
Cravens died in Washington, D.C., on January 13, 1939 (age 66 years, 361 days). He is interred at Oak Cemetery, Fort Smith, Arkansas.

== See also ==
- List of members of the United States Congress who died in office (1900–1949)

U.S. House of Representatives
Preceded by John S. Little	Member of the U.S. House of Representatives from Arkansas's 4th congressional district 1907-1913	Succeeded by Otis Wingo
Preceded by Effiegene L. Wingo	Member of the U.S. House of Representatives from Arkansas's 4th congressional district 1933-1939	Succeeded by William F. Cravens
