= Mount Ida Cities Service Filling Station =

- U.S. National Register of Historic Places
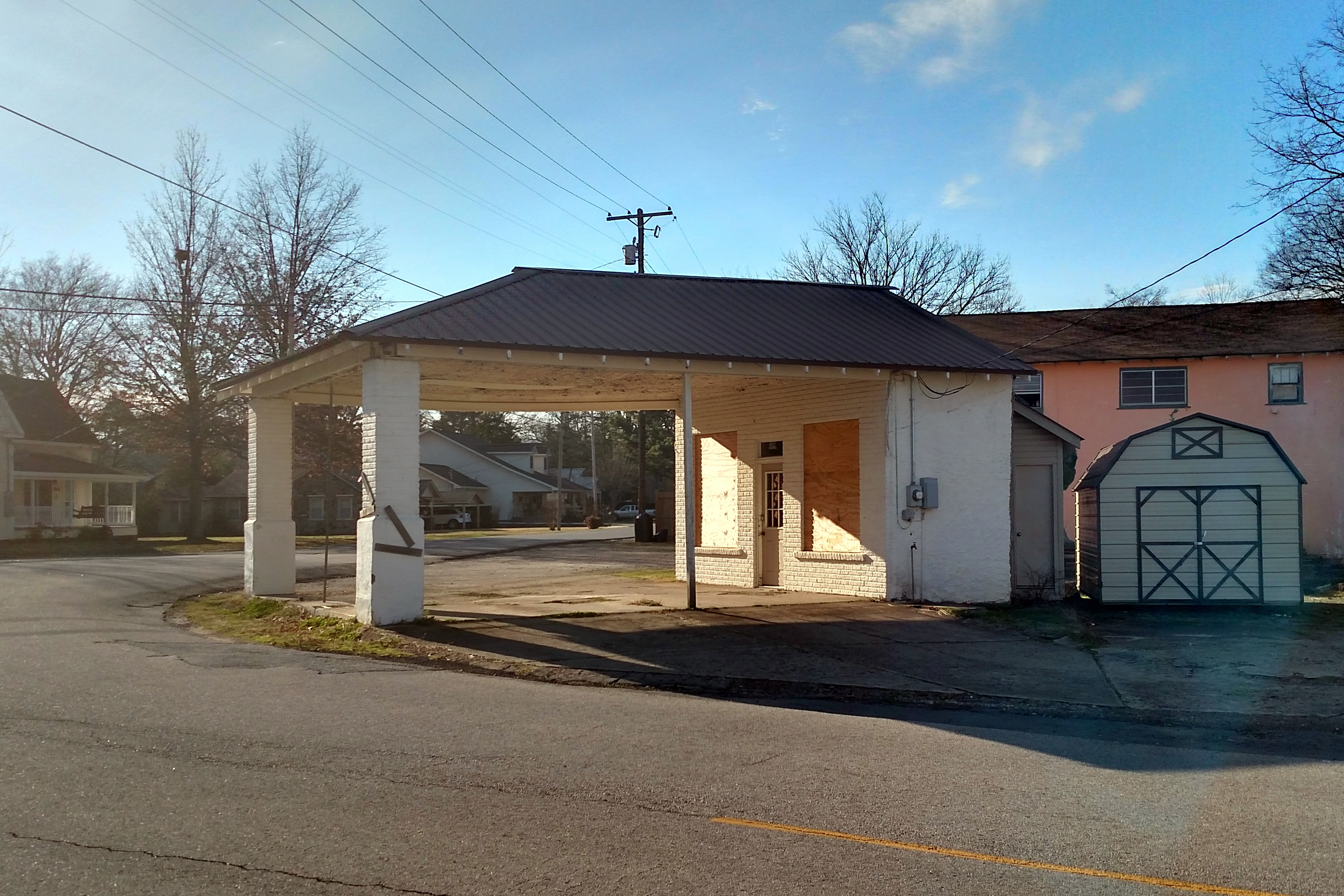

- Location within Arkansas Location within the United States
- Location: 204 Whittington, Mount Ida, Arkansas
- Coordinates: 34°33′23″N 93°38′1″W
- Area: less than one acre
- Built: 1925
- Built by: Cities Service (now Citgo)
- Architectural style: Bungalow/craftsman
- MPS: Arkansas Highway History and Architecture MPS
- NRHP reference No.: 01001230
- Added to NRHP: November 19, 2001

The Mount Ida Cities Service Filling Station is a historic automotive service station at 204 Whittington Street in Mount Ida, Arkansas. It is a small five-sided frame structure, finished in brick covered with stucco, with a hip roof that extends to form a canopy over the service area, with supporting brick piers at the far corners. Its front (under the canopy) has fixed four-pane windows flanking a center entrance. Built in 1925 by Cities Service, it was used as a gas station until 1966, and has since housed a variety of small businesses. Its role as a gas station was briefly resurrected in the film White River Kid, which was shot here in 1998.

The building was listed on the National Register of Historic Places in 2001.

== See also ==
- National Register of Historic Places listings in Montgomery County, Arkansas
