= Cogburn Dipping Vat =

- U.S. National Register of Historic Places
- Location within Arkansas Location within the United States
- Nearest city: Black Spring, Arkansas
- Coordinates: 34°26′44″N 93°47′0″W
- Area: less than one acre
- Built: 1930
- MPS: Dip That Tick:Texas Tick Fever Eradication in Arkansas MPS
- NRHP reference No.: 06000467
- Added to NRHP: June 7, 2006

The Cogburn Dipping Vat is a historic former cattle dipping facility in Ouachita National Forest, west of Black Spring, Arkansas. It is located about 19 metres (62 ft) west of Forest Road 73 and south of a perennial stream. It is a U-shaped concrete structure, with a distinctive curved shape that matches the contours of the terrain, with a concrete pad at one end. The total length of the structure is about 13 metres (43 ft). It was built between 1930 and 1940 as part of a state program to eradicate Texas tick fever from the state's cattle. The vat's name derives from the Cogburn, who homesteaded a farm in the area, and probably built the vat to serve their needs and those of other nearby farmers.

The vat was listed on the National Register of Historic Places in 2006.

== See also ==
- Guinn Dipping Vat
- National Register of Historic Places listings in Montgomery County, Arkansas
