= Norman, Arkansas =

- Town
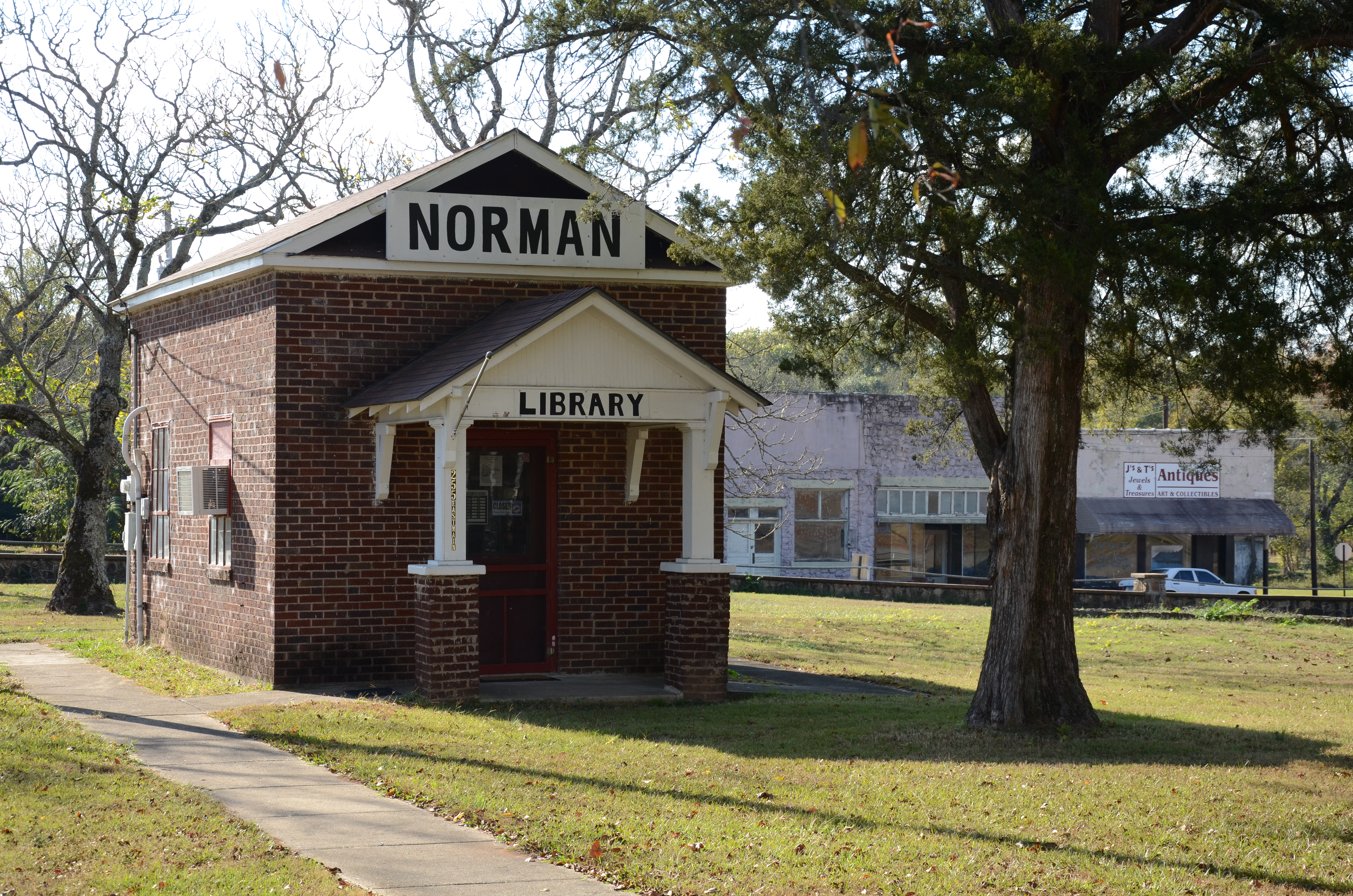
- Norman Public Library on the town square

- Location in Montgomery County, Arkansas
- Coordinates: 34°27′30″N 93°40′45″W
- Country: United States
- State: Arkansas
- County: Montgomery

Area
  - Total: 1.14 sq mi (2.95 km^{2})
  - Land: 1.12 sq mi (2.91 km^{2})
  - Water: 0.015 sq mi (0.04 km^{2})
- Elevation: 722 ft (220 m)

Population (2020)
  - Total: 303
  - Estimate (2025): 307 ▲
  - Density: 269.4/sq mi (104.02/km^{2})
- Time zone: UTC-6 (Central (CST))
  - Summer (DST): UTC-5 (CDT)
- ZIP code: 71960
- Area code: 870
- FIPS code: 05-50030
- GNIS feature ID: 2406998
- Website: normanar.com

Norman is a town in Montgomery County, Arkansas, United States. It was known as Womble until 1925. The population was 303 at the 2020 census, down from 378 in 2010.

== Geography ==
The town is located in southern Montgomery County at the intersection of Arkansas highways 8 and 27. It is 9 miles (14 km) south of Mount Ida, the county seat, and 13 miles (21 km) northwest of Glenwood. Norman is situated on the northeast bank of the Caddo River (which defines the town's southwestern city limits) and is surrounded by the Ouachita National Forest.

According to the United States Census Bureau, the town has a total area of 1.14 square miles (3.0 km^{2}), of which 0.014 square miles (0.036 km^{2}), or 1.23%, are water.

Norman is part of a local region that was formerly known as Womble. The west end of the town is unofficially known as Middlebuster and was in the past known as "Poor Horse".

There is a Caddo Native American burial ground on the southern end of town. It was discovered by city officials, led by then-mayor Duane Cox, who protected it with a wooden fence. Recently, descendants of the Caddo added to the site a footpath and benches as well as plaques containing historical information regarding the living habits of Native Americans.

== Demographics ==
Historical population
Census	Pop.	Note	%±
1910	552		—
1920	420		−23.9%
1930	478		13.8%
1940	512		7.1%
1950	401		−21.7%
1960	482		20.2%
1970	505		4.8%
1980	539		6.7%
1990	382		−29.1%
2000	423		10.7%
2010	378		−10.6%
2020	303		−19.8%
2025 (est.)	307	▲	1.3%
U.S. Decennial Census

As of the census of 2000, there were 423 people, 190 households, and 117 families residing in the town. The population density was 140.8/km^{2} (364.8/mi^{2}). There were 224 housing units at an average density of 74.6/km^{2} (193.2/mi^{2}). The racial makeup of the town was 94.56% White, 1.42% Native American, 0.95% Asian, 0.95% from other races, and 2.13% from two or more races. 2.84% of the population were Hispanic or Latino of any race.

There were 190 households, out of which 25.3% had children under the age of 18 living with them, 41.1% were married couples living together, 16.8% had a female householder with no husband present, and 37.9% were non-families. 34.7% of all households were made up of individuals, and 20.0% had someone living alone who was 65 years of age or older. The average household size was 2.23 and the average family size was 2.84.

In the town, the population was spread out, with 26% under the age of 18, 6.6% from 18 to 24, 23.4% from 25 to 44, 25.1% from 45 to 64, and 18.9% who were 65 years of age or older. The median age was 40 years. For every 100 females, there were 79.2 males. For every 100 females aged 18 and over, there were 72.0 males.

The median income for a household in the town was $20,481, and the median income for a family was $25,417. Males had a median income of $28,250 versus $16,875 for females. The per capita income for the town was $10,807. About 21.0% of families and 29.1% of the population were below the poverty line, including 44.8% of those under age 18 and 22.5% of those age 65 or over.

== Education ==
Public education for elementary and secondary school students is provided by the Caddo Hills School District, which leads to graduation from Caddo Hills High School.

The Norman School District merged into the Caddo Gap one in 1971.

== Attractions ==
- Crystal Springs Dam
- Crystal Springs Camp Shelter
- The Norman Public Library is the smallest free-standing public library in the United States at just 170 square feet. It was originally constructed as a pumping station.

== Transportation ==
- Arkansas Highway 8
- Arkansas Highway 27

== Gallery ==
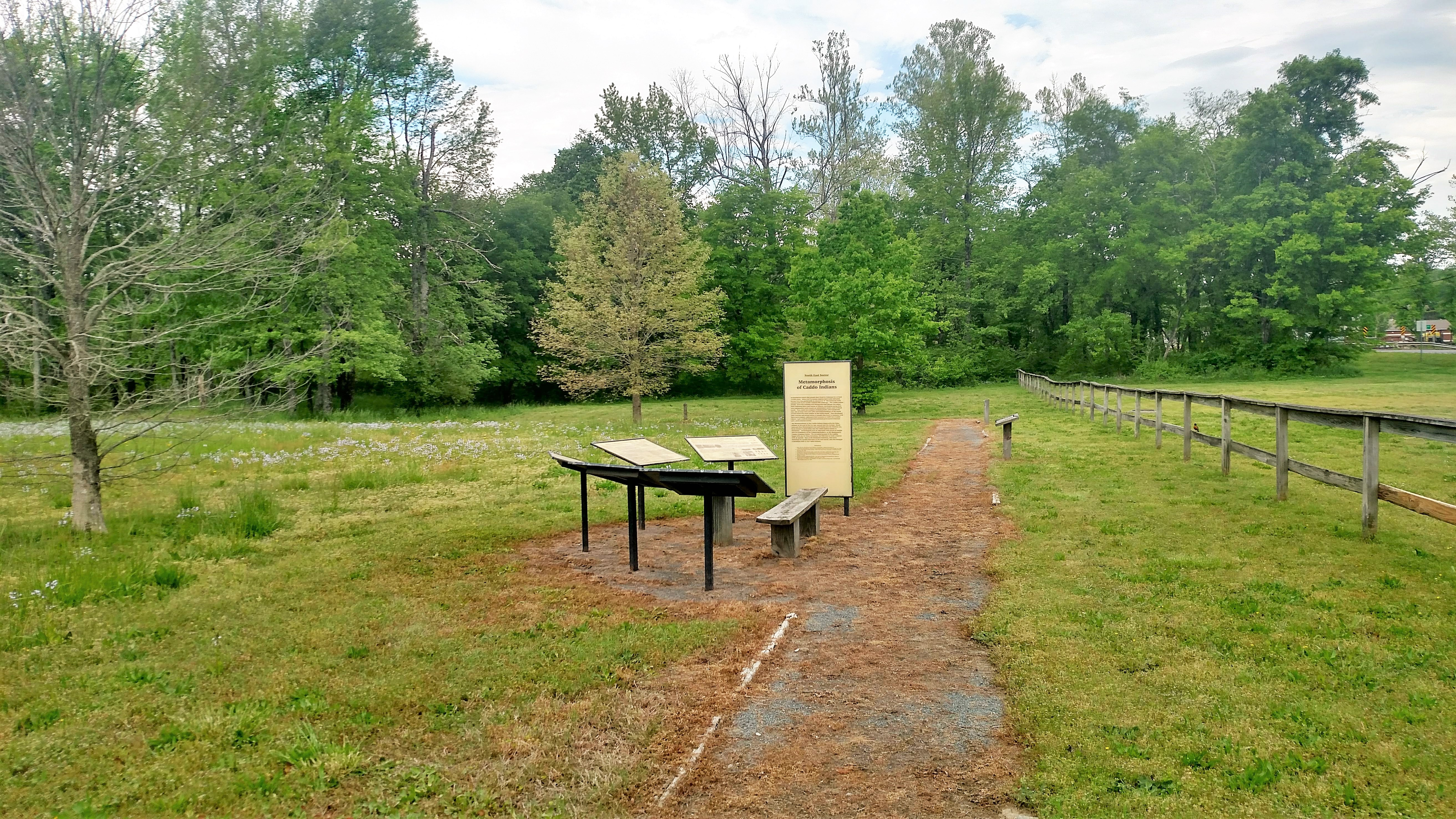
Caddo burial mound

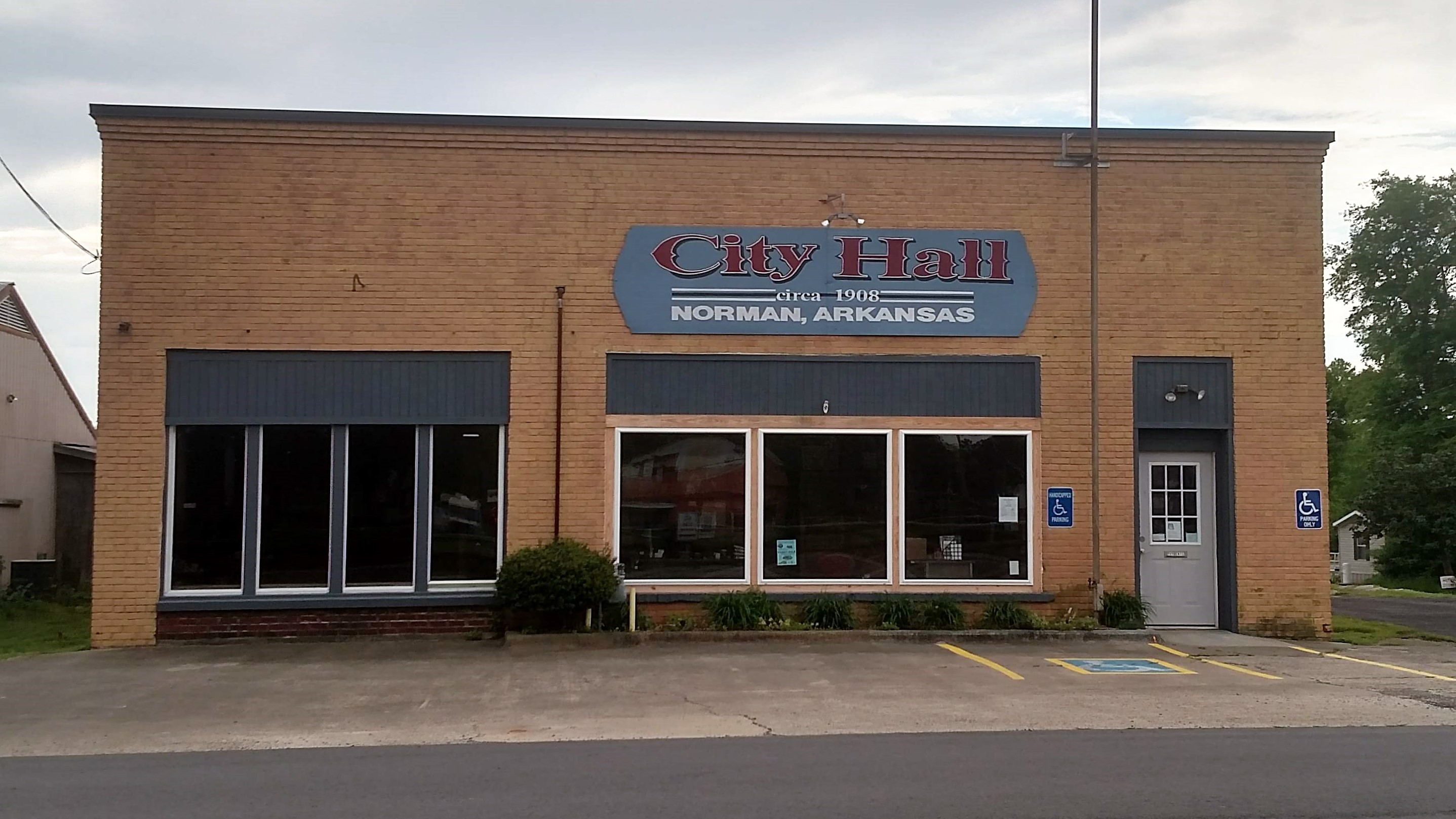
Town hall

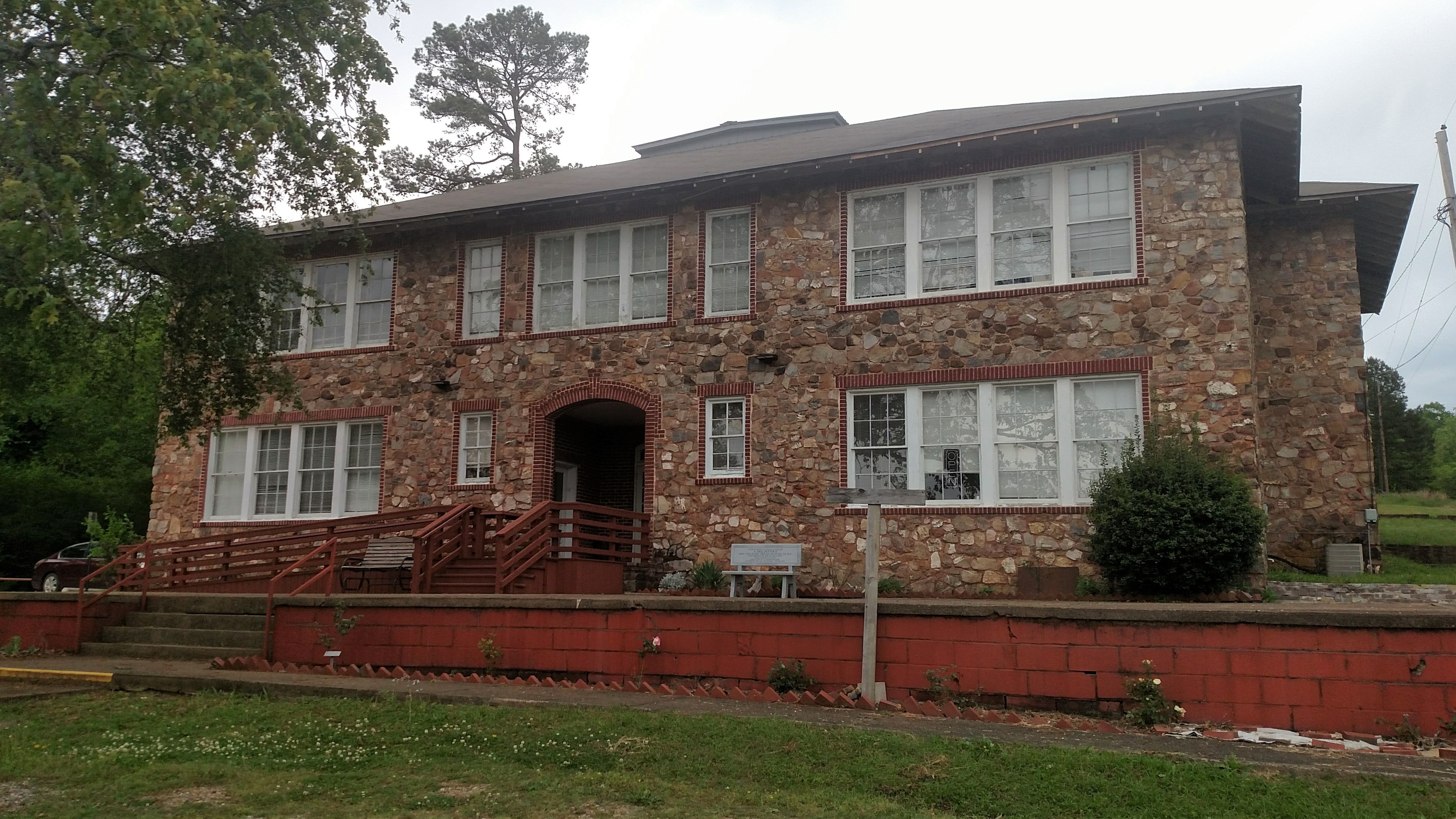
Former school

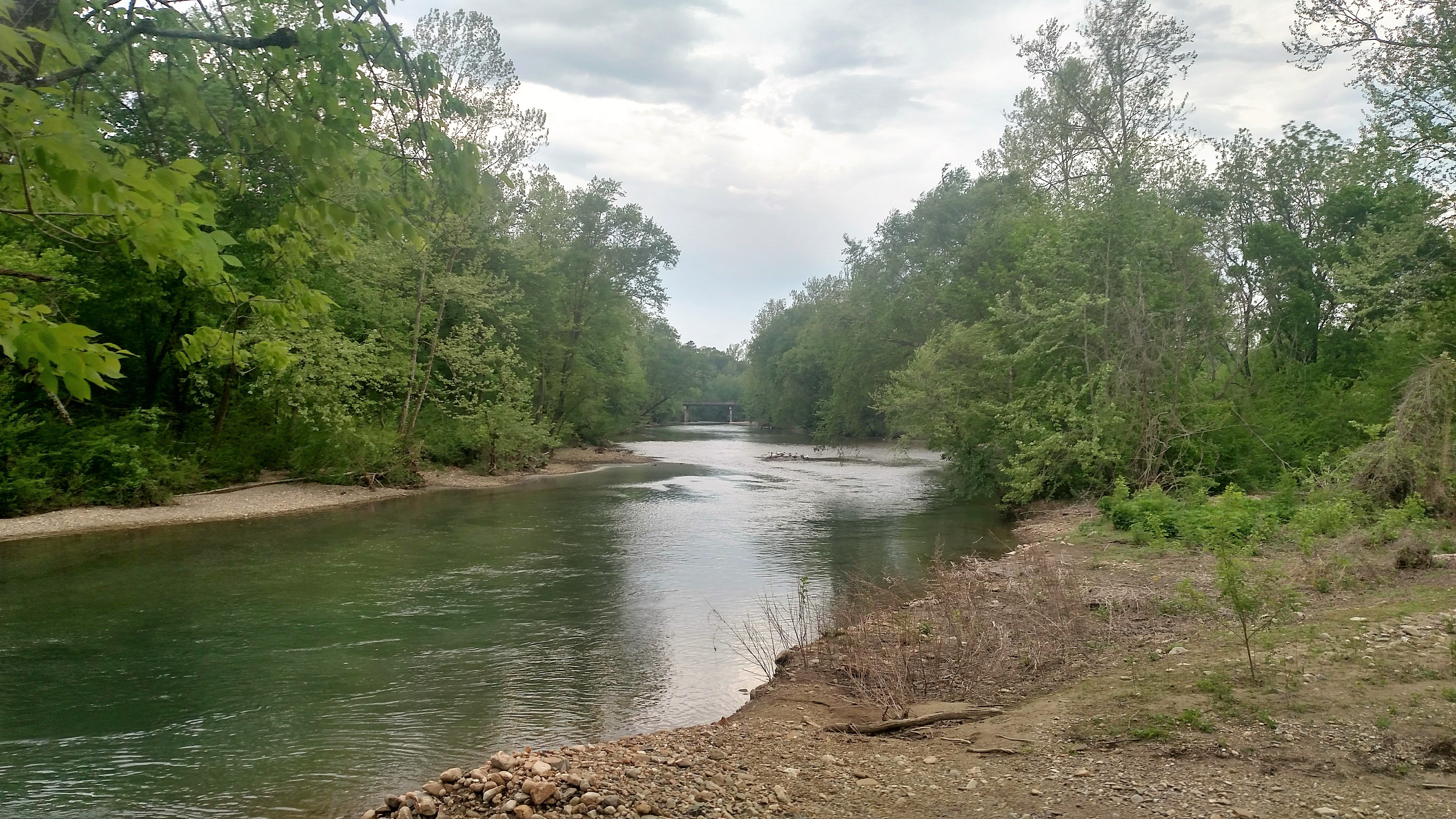
Caddo River
