= Story, Arkansas =

- Unincorporated community
- Location within Arkansas Location within the United States
- Coordinates: 34°41′35″N 93°31′04″W
- Country: United States
- State: Arkansas
- County: Montgomery
- Elevation: 702 ft (214 m)
- Time zone: UTC-6 (Central (CST))
  - Summer (DST): UTC-5 (CDT)
- ZIP code: 71970
- Area code: 870
- GNIS feature ID: 73729

Story is an unincorporated community in Montgomery County, Arkansas, United States. Story is located at the junction of Arkansas highways 27 and 298, 11.5 miles (18.5 km) northeast of Mount Ida. Story has a post office with ZIP code 71970.

The 37.8-mile long Womble Trail connects to the Ouachita National Recreation Trail north of the community.

== Education ==
Public education for elementary and secondary school students is provided by the Mount Ida School District, which leads to graduation from Mount Ida High School.
