= Arkansas Highway 227 =

State highway in Arkansas, United States

Highway 227

Route information
- Maintained by ArDOT
- Existed: July 10, 1957–present

Section 1
- Length: 7.43 mi (11.96 km)
- South end: US 70 at Hempwallace
- North end: US 270 near Royal

Section 2
- Length: 11.74 mi (18.89 km)
- South end: US 270 at Piney
- North end: Lake Ouachita State Park

Location
- Country: United States
- State: Arkansas
- Counties: Garland

Highway system
- Arkansas Highway System; Interstate; US; State; Business; Spurs; Suffixed; Scenic; Heritage
← AR 226	→ AR 228

Arkansas Highway 227 (AR 227) is a designation for two state highways in Garland County, Arkansas. One segment of 7.43 miles (11.96 km) runs from U.S. Route 70 (US 70) north to US 270 west of Royal. A second segment of 11.74 miles (18.89 km) runs from US 270 at Piney north to Lake Ouachita State Park. Both routes are maintained by the Arkansas Department of Transportation (ARDOT).

== Route description ==
=== Hempwallace to Royal ===
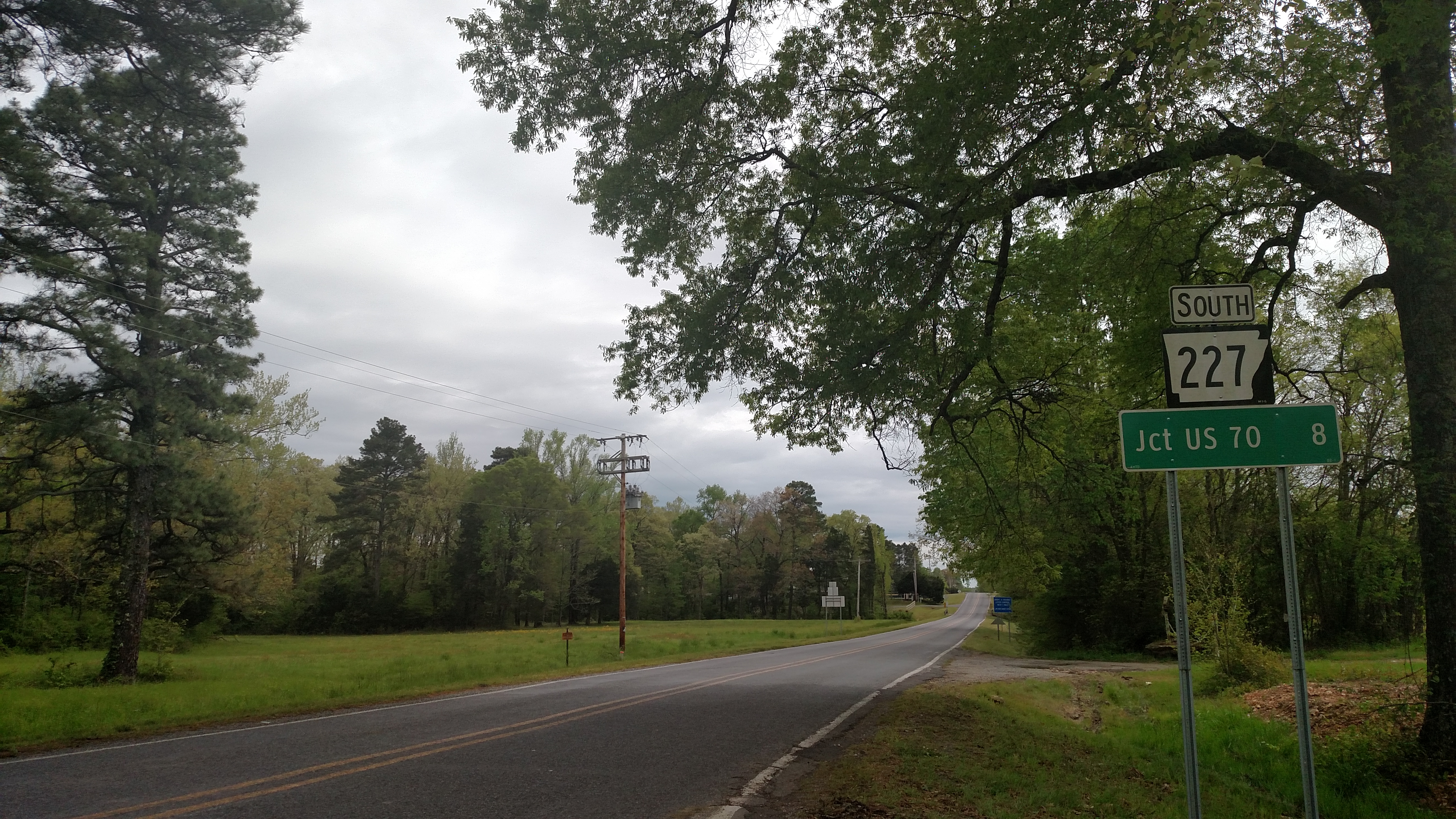
First reassurance marker south of US 270 intersection

Highway 227 begins at US 70 at Hempwallace. The route winds north through rolling hills through the community of Sunshine before terminating at US 270 west of Royal.

=== Piney to Lake Ouachita State Park ===
The route begins at US 270 at Piney near Lake Hamilton. Highway 227 runs north through Hawes and Mountain Pine before intersecting Highway 192. Following this intersection, the route enters the Ouachita National Forest and Lake Ouachita State Park. Highway 227 terminates at Crawdad Island and Mountain Pine Roads (state park roads) near the visitor center.

== History ==
Highway 227 was created from US 270 to Lake Ouachita State Park by the Arkansas State Highway Commission (ASHC) on July 10, 1957. The second segment was created on July 28, 1965.

== Major intersections ==
The entire route is in Garland County.

Location	mi	km	Destinations	Notes
Hempwallace	0.00	0.00	US 70 – Hot Springs, Glenwood	Southern terminus
	7.43	11.96	US 270 – Hot Springs, Mount Ida	Northern terminus
Gap in route
Piney	0.00	0.00	US 270 – Hot Springs, Mount Ida	Southern terminus
	9.20	14.81	AR 192 east – Hot Springs Village	Western terminus of AR 192
	11.74	18.89	Lake Ouachita State Park	Northern terminus
1.000 mi = 1.609 km; 1.000 km = 0.621 mi

== Sources ==
- "Minutes of the Meeting of the Arkansas State Highway Commission" (PDF). Little Rock: Arkansas State Highway Commission. 1953–1969. OCLC 21798861. Archived from the original (PDF) on October 1, 2018.
- "Minutes of the Meeting of the Arkansas State Highway Commission" (PDF). Little Rock: Arkansas State Highway Commission. 1970–1979. OCLC 21798861. Archived from the original (PDF) on November 5, 2011.
- "Minutes of the Meeting of the Arkansas State Highway Commission" (PDF). Little Rock: Arkansas State Highway Commission. 1980–1989. OCLC 21798861.
- "Minutes of the Meeting of the Arkansas State Highway Commission" (PDF). Little Rock: Arkansas State Highway Commission. 1990–1999. OCLC 21798861. Archived from the original (PDF) on July 21, 2019.
- "Minutes of the Meeting of the Arkansas State Highway Commission" (PDF). Little Rock: Arkansas State Highway Commission. 2000–2009. OCLC 21798861.
- "Minutes of the Meeting of the Arkansas State Highway Commission" (PDF). Little Rock: Arkansas State Highway Commission. 2010–2019. OCLC 21798861. Archived from the original (PDF) on March 4, 2016.
