= Womble Trail =

Recreational trail in Arkansas, United States

Coordinates: 34°37′24.36″N 93°33′15.22″W

- Length: Approx. 37 miles (60 km)
- Location: Ouachita Mountains
- Trailheads: Round Top Trail on Forest Road D75A; Highway 27 south of the bridge crossing Lake Ouachita; North Fork Lake; and Arkansas Highway 298 trail intersection.
- Use: Hiking, Mountain biking
- Difficulty: Easy to moderate
- Season: Year-round

Womble Trail, located in the Ouachita National Forest in western Arkansas, United States, is a singletrack path running more than 37 miles from North Fork Lake to the Ouachita National Recreation Trail. The U.S. Forest Service trail is open for use by mountain bikers and hikers. Horses are not allowed. The nearest towns are Mount Ida and Oden.

Some Womble Trail segments meander along bluffs of the Ouachita River. The Forest Service urges extra caution in these sections. The trail is unsurfaced and marked with white triangles. The Forest Service rates usage as "heavy" and also recommends the spring and fall as the best months to use the trail.

International Mountain Bicycling Association has designated Womble Trail as an IMBA epic trail. IMBA cited six hours of riding and 6,000 cumulative feet of elevation change for the rating, along with the trail's scenery. Actual elevation ranges from 1,000 to 1,600 feet, through hardwood and pine forests.

== Access ==
Trail users can hook up with Roundtop Trail and Ouachita National Recreation Trail (west of Arkansas Highway 27) to form an 8-mile loop.

Parking is available at four trailheads: Round Top Trail on Forest Road D75A; Highway 27 south of the bridge crossing Lake Ouachita; North Fork Lake; and Arkansas Highway 298 trail intersection. Access is also available from Ouachita River float camps. Vault toilets are available at float camps. Drinking water is not available. There is no charge to use Womble Trail.

Mountain bikers have the opportunity for longer rides by using the adjacent section of the Ouachita National Recreation Trail. ONRT is open to mountain bikes, from Talimena Scenic Drive east of Arkansas' Queen Wilhelmina State Park, eastward to the Arkansas Highway 7 trailhead, north of Jessieville, Arkansas.

Womble Trail meets the Ouachita Trail at Muddy Creek, at Ouachita Trail mile marker 117.2. Womble Trail mile markers run from north to south. The southern end is flatter; it gets steadily steeper toward the north.

== Volunteers ==
The Friends of the Ouachita Trail help maintain Womble Trail. Any interested person can volunteer to help, but must sign a Forest Service release. The club's website also maintains a list of trail conditions and other information.
