= Mount Ida School District =

School district in Arkansas, United States

Address
- 338 Whittington Street Mount Ida, Arkansas, 71957; United States

District information
- Type: Public
- Grades: K–12
- NCES District ID: 0509990

Students and staff
- Students: 447
- Teachers: 42.63
- Staff: 43.33
- Student–teacher ratio: 10.49

Other information
- Website: www.mountidaschools.com

Mount Ida School District 20 is a public school district based in Mount Ida, Arkansas. The school district serves more than 500 students and employs more than 80 educators and staff at its two schools and district offices.

The school district encompasses 296.33 square miles (767.5 km^{2}) of land in Montgomery County and Garland County and serves all or portions of Mount Ida, Story, Sims, Norman, Oden, Bonnerdale, Royal and Jessieville.

== Schools ==
- Mount Ida Elementary School, serving grades prekindergarten through grade 6.
- Mount Ida High School, serving grades 7 through 12.
