= Arkansas Highway 192 =

State highway in Arkansas, United States

Highway 192
- AR 192 highlighted in red

Route information
- Maintained by ArDOT

Section 1
- Length: 5.32 mi (8.56 km)
- West end: US 70 near Rockwell
- East end: Marion Anderson Road near Lake Hamilton

Section 2
- Length: 5.57 mi (8.96 km)
- West end: AR 227 near Lake Ouachita State Park
- East end: AR 7 at Hot Springs Village

Location
- Country: United States
- State: Arkansas
- Counties: Garland

Highway system
- Arkansas Highway System; Interstate; US; State; Business; Spurs; Suffixed; Scenic; Heritage
← AR 191	→ AR 193

Arkansas Highway 192 (AR 192) is a designation for two state highways in Garland County, Arkansas. One segment of 5.32 miles (8.56 km) runs from U.S. Route 70 (US 70) west of Rockwell. A second segment of 5.57 miles (8.96 km) runs from Highway 227 east of Lake Ouachita State Park east to Highway 7 at Hot Springs Village.

== Route description ==
=== Rockwell to Lake Hamilton ===
Highway 192 begins at US 70 west of Rockwell and winds generally south along the shoreline as Marion Anderson Road, with state maintenance ending at Northshore Drive west of Lake Hamilton. Traffic counts from the Arkansas State Highway and Transportation Department (AHTD) reveal that less than 500 vehicles per day (VPD) used Highway 192 along its routing from US 70 to Northshore Drive.

=== Lake Ouachita State Park to Hot Springs Village ===
The route begins at Highway 227 east of Lake Ouachita State Park. Highway 192 runs almost directly northeast through very rural and heavily forested areas of Garland County. The route terminates at its only junction with a state highway, Highway 7 at Hot Springs Village. This segment was added to the state highway system in 2004 and averages approximately 1800 vehicles per day along the entire routing.

== Major intersections ==
The entire route is in Garland County.

Location	mi	km	Destinations	Notes
	0.00	0.00	US 70 – Glenwood, Hot Springs	Western terminus
	5.32	8.56	Marion Anderson Road	Continuation west
Gap in route
	0.00	0.00	AR 227 – Lake Ouachita State Park, Mountain Pine	Western terminus
Hot Springs Village	5.57	8.96	AR 7 – Hot Springs, Jessieville	Eastern terminus
1.000 mi = 1.609 km; 1.000 km = 0.621 mi
