= Mountain Pine, Arkansas =

- City
- Logo

- Location of Mountain Pine in Garland County, Arkansas.
- Coordinates: 34°34′10″N 93°10′21″W
- Country: United States
- State: Arkansas
- County: Garland

Area
  - Total: 1.68 sq mi (4.34 km^{2})
  - Land: 1.66 sq mi (4.30 km^{2})
  - Water: 0.012 sq mi (0.03 km^{2})
- Elevation: 463 ft (141 m)

Population (2020)
  - Total: 585
  - Estimate (2025): 586 ▲
  - Density: 352.2/sq mi (135.99/km^{2})
- Time zone: UTC-6 (Central (CST))
  - Summer (DST): UTC-5 (CDT)
- ZIP code: 71956
- Area code: 501
- FIPS code: 05-47450
- GNIS feature ID: 2404332
- Website: www.mountainpinear.com

Mountain Pine is a city in Garland County, Arkansas, United States. It is part of the Hot Springs Metropolitan Statistical Area. As of the 2020 census, Mountain Pine had a population of 585. It is located immediately southeast of Lake Ouachita below the Blakely Mountain Dam. The city consists of five defined neighborhoods: Pinewood (north), South Mountain Pine, a business district (including City Hall, a bank, a post office and a store), Cozy Acres (southwest) and the Mountain View/Timberland area.

Mountain Pine was founded as a company town in the late 1920s by Dierks Lumber and Coal Company, which operated a vast lumber mill on the town's east side. The mill was closed in 2006 by then-owners Weyerhaeuser, and later dismantled.

== Geography ==
Mountain Pine is located near the center of Garland County. It is 11 miles (18 km) northwest of Hot Springs.

According to the United States Census Bureau, Mountain Pine has a total area of 1.8 square miles (4.6 km^{2}), of which 0.01 square miles (0.03 km^{2}), or 0.75%, is water.

== Climate ==
The climate in this area is characterized by hot, humid summers and generally mild to cool winters. According to the Köppen Climate Classification system, Mountain Pine has a humid subtropical climate, abbreviated "Cfa" on climate maps.

== Demographics ==
Historical population
Census	Pop.	Note	%±
1950	1,155		—
1960	1,279		10.7%
1970	1,127		−11.9%
1980	1,068		−5.2%
1990	866		−18.9%
2000	772		−10.9%
2010	770		−0.3%
2020	585		−24.0%
2025 (est.)	586	▲	0.2%
U.S. Decennial Census

=== 2020 census ===
Mountain Pine racial composition
Race	Number	Percentage
White (non-Hispanic)	389	66.5%
Black or African American (non-Hispanic)	100	17.09%
Pacific Islander	2	0.34%
Other/Mixed	64	10.94%
Hispanic or Latino	30	5.13%

As of the 2020 United States census, there were 585 people, 284 households, and 147 families residing in the city.

=== 2000 census ===
As of the census of 2000, there were 772 people, 308 households, and 221 families residing in the city. The population density was 445.4 inhabitants per square mile (172.0/km^{2}). There were 353 housing units at an average density of 203.7 per square mile (78.6/km^{2}). The racial makeup of the city was 71.37% White, 23.45% Black or African American, 1.94% Native American, 0.65% Asian, 0.26% from other races, and 2.33% from two or more races. 0.39% of the population were Hispanic or Latino of any race.

There were 308 households, out of which 33.4% had children under the age of 18 living with them, 44.5% were married couples living together, 20.1% had a female householder with no husband present, and 28.2% were non-families. 26.9% of all households were made up of individuals, and 11.7% had someone living alone who was 65 years of age or older. The average household size was 2.51, and the average family size was 2.99.

In the city, the population was spread out, with 28.9% under the age of 18, 9.2% from 18 to 24, 27.1% from 25 to 44, 21.9% from 45 to 64, and 13.0% who were 65 years of age or older. The median age was 34 years. For every 100 females, there were 91.6 males. For every 100 females age 18 and over, there were 87.4 males.

The median income for a household in the city was $20,804, and the median income for a family was $22,344. Males had a median income of $22,206 versus $16,058 for females. About 39.8% of families were below the poverty level.

== Education ==
=== Ełementary and secondary education ===
Public education for early childhood, elementary and secondary school students is provided by:

- Mountain Pine School District, which leads to graduation from Mountain Pine High School

== Infrastructure ==
=== Transportation ===
Mountain Pine is connected by Arkansas Highway 192, which connects to Arkansas Highway 7 between Hot Springs Village and Jessieville, and by Arkansas Highway 227, which connects to U.S. Route 270 in Hot Springs.

== Notable person ==
Bobby Bones was born in Mountain Pine. He hosts a nationally syndicated morning radio show based out of Nashville, TN called The Bobby Bones Show.
