= Sims, Arkansas =

- Unincorporated community
- Location within Arkansas Location within the United States
- Coordinates: 34°39′33″N 93°41′28″W
- Country: United States
- State: Arkansas
- County: Montgomery
- Elevation: 725 ft (221 m)
- Time zone: UTC-6 (Central (CST))
  - Summer (DST): UTC-5 (CDT)
- ZIP code: 71969
- Area code: 870
- GNIS feature ID: 73585

Sims is an unincorporated community in Montgomery County, Arkansas, United States. Sims is located on Arkansas Highway 88, 8 miles (13 km) north-northwest of Mount Ida. Sims has a post office with ZIP code 71969.

== Education ==
Public education for elementary and secondary school students is provided by the Mount Ida School District or the Ouachita River School District, which leads to graduation from Mount Ida High School or Oden High School.
