= Gillham House =

Historic house in Arkansas, United States

- U.S. National Register of Historic Places
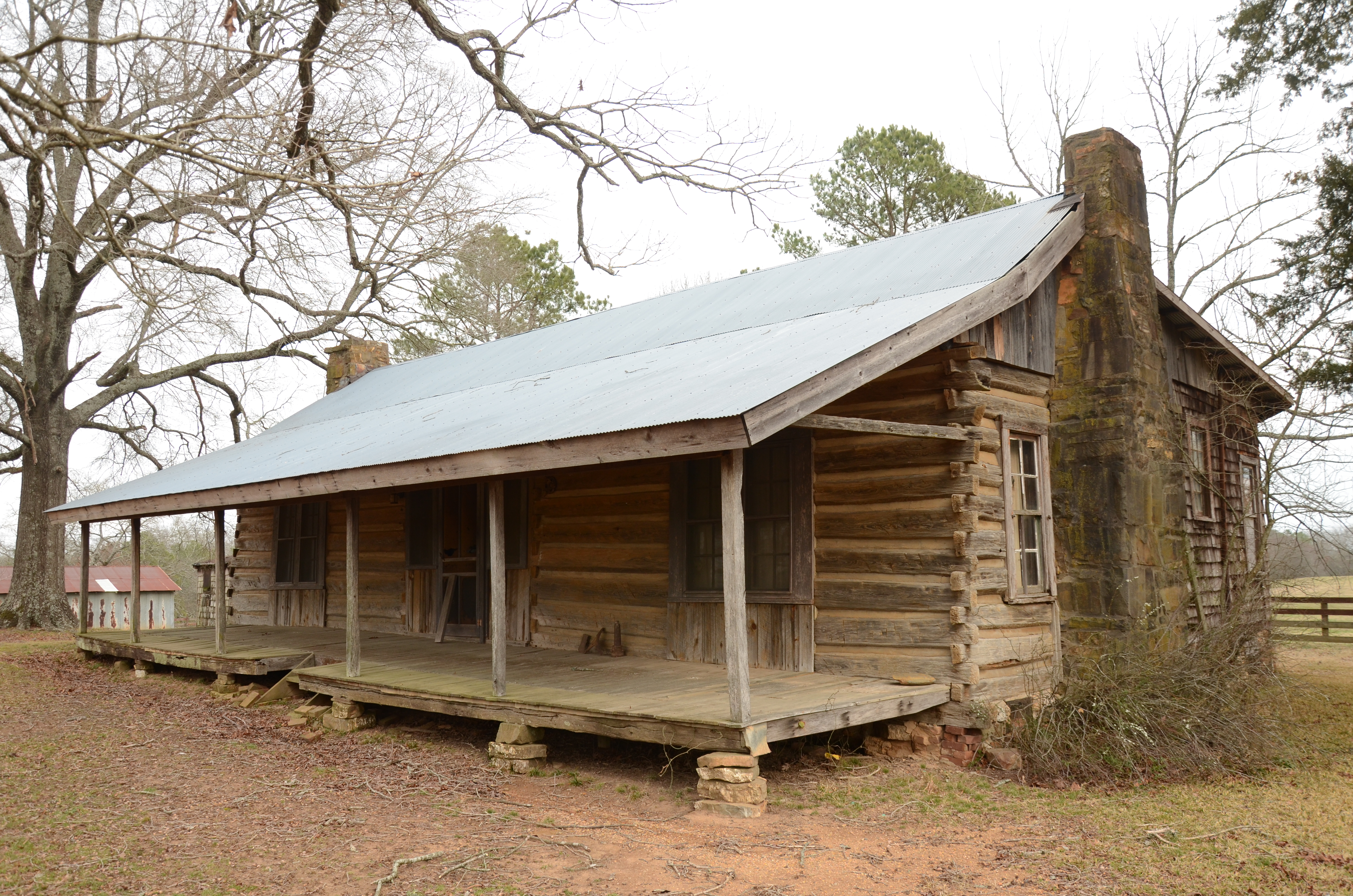

- Location within Arkansas Location within the United States
- Location: Co. Rd. 584 N of jct. with US 270, Royal, Arkansas
- Coordinates: 34°31′2″N 93°14′28″W
- Area: less than one acre
- Built: 1866
- Built by: Phillip Phagan Gillhan
- Architectural style: Dogtrot
- NRHP reference No.: 94000188
- Added to NRHP: March 17, 1994

The Gillham House is a historic house in rural Garland County, Arkansas. It is located north of the hamlet of Royal, about 0.5 miles (0.80 km) north of United States Route 270 on the east side of Gillham Road. It is a single story log dogtrot, with a side gable roof and a shed-roof porch across the front. Its original log structure is visible, with its log pens fastened by V-notch and center-notch joints. The house was built about 1866 by Philip Gillham, a Union Army veteran of the American Civil War.

The house was listed on the National Register of Historic Places in 1994.

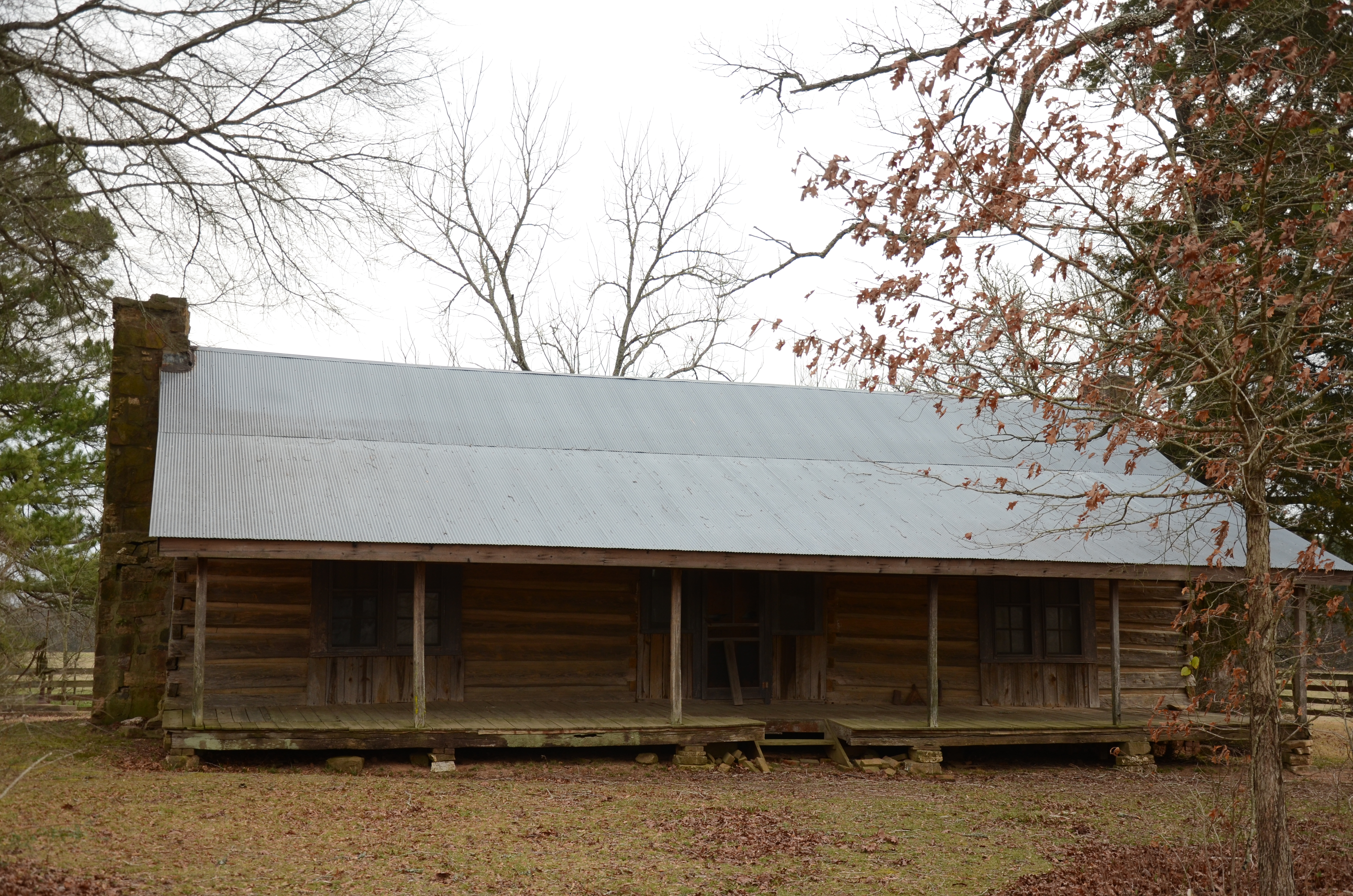
Front view of Gillham House

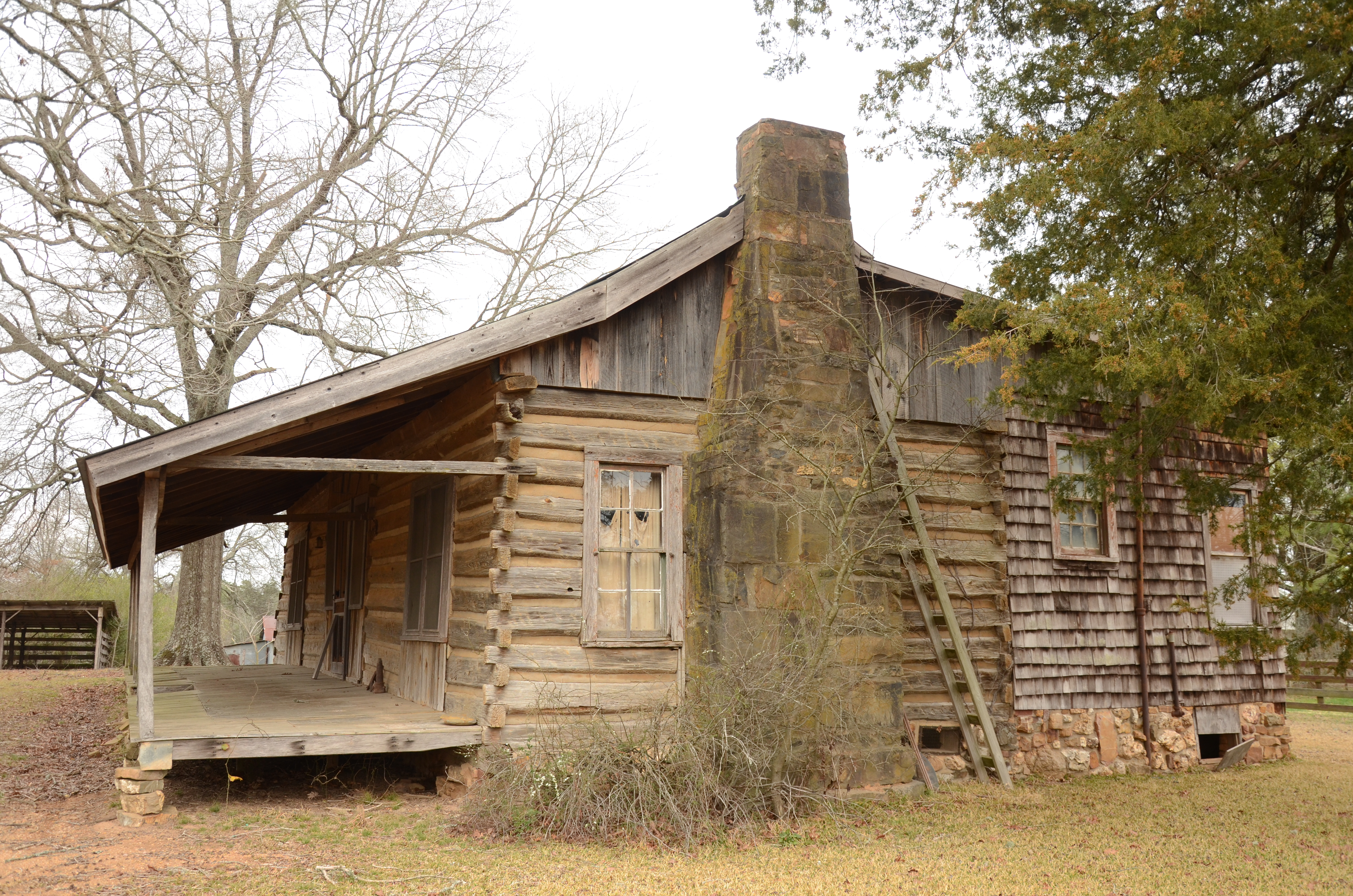
Side view of Gillham House

== See also ==
- National Register of Historic Places listings in Garland County, Arkansas
