= Arkansas Highway 298 =

State highway in Arkansas, United States

Highway 298

Route information
- Maintained by ArDOT

Section 1
- Length: 3.71 mi (5.97 km)
- West end: AR 88 at Sims
- East end: US 270

Section 2
- Length: 28.39 mi (45.69 km)
- West end: AR 27 at Story
- East end: AR 7

Section 3
- Length: 13.81 mi (22.23 km)
- West end: AR 9
- East end: AR 5

Location
- Country: United States
- State: Arkansas

Highway system
- Arkansas Highway System; Interstate; US; State; Business; Spurs; Suffixed; Scenic; Heritage
← AR 297	→ AR 299

Highway 298 (AR 298, Ark. 298, and Hwy. 298) is a designation for three state highways in Lower Arkansas. The western segment of 3.71 miles (5.97 km) begins at Sims at Highway 88 and runs southeast to US Route 270 (US 270). A middle segment of 28.39 miles (45.69 km) runs from Highway 27 at Story east to Highway 7. A segment in Saline County of 13.81 miles (22.23 km) runs east from Highway 9 to Highway 5 near Benton.

== Route description ==
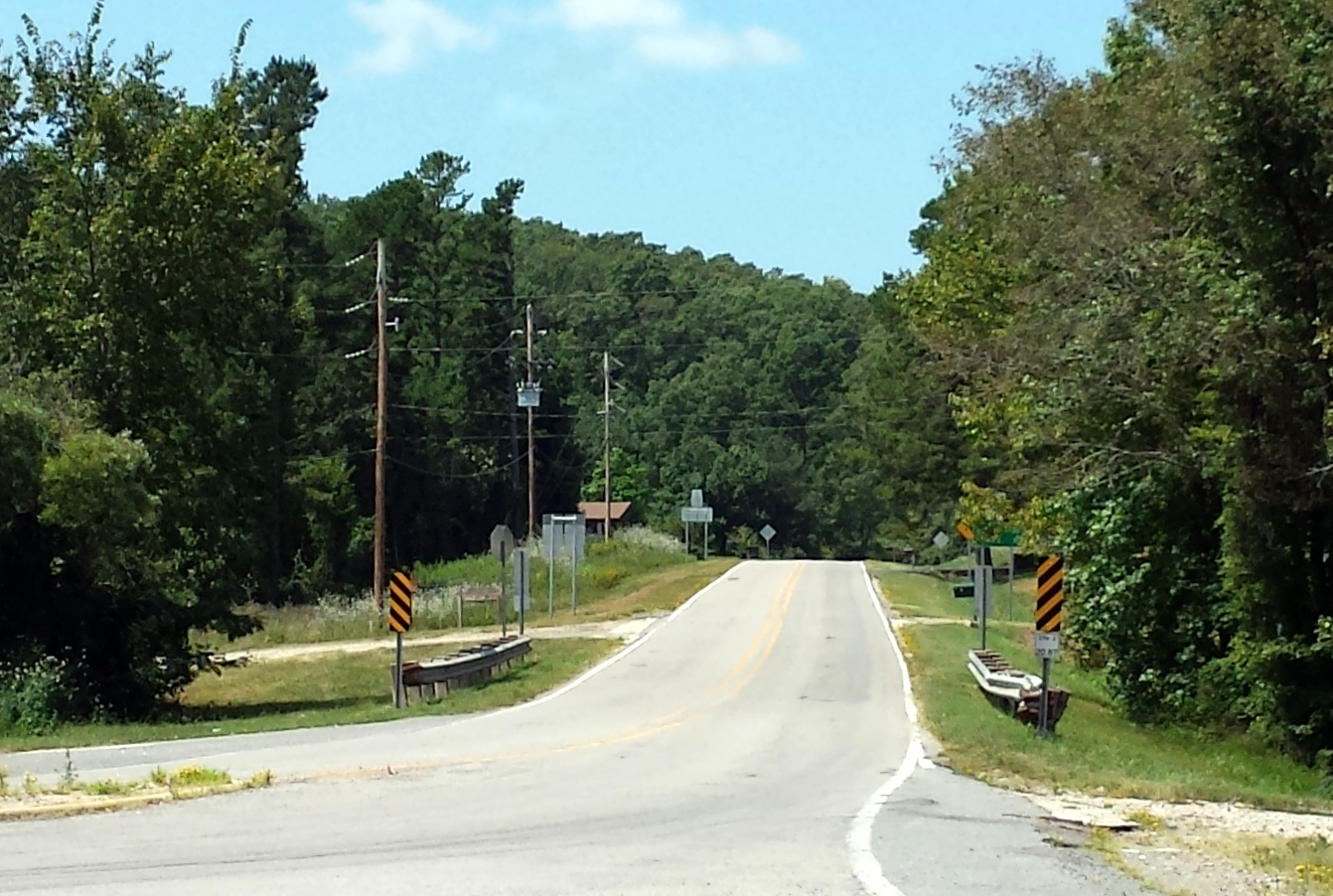
Highway 298 at the Highway 7 eastern terminus

=== Sims to Highway 270 ===
The route begins at a junction with Arkansas Highway 88 at Sims and runs southeast to US 270. This segment does not cross or concur with any other state highways.

=== Story to Highway 7 ===
The route begins at Arkansas Highway 27 at Story, Arkansas in Montgomery County and runs east through the Ouachita National Forest for almost its entire length. Highway 298 passes through very wooded area with sparse populations, crossing over many feeder streams for Lake Ouachita. The highway ends at a junction with Arkansas Highway 7 north of Hot Springs.

=== Saline County ===
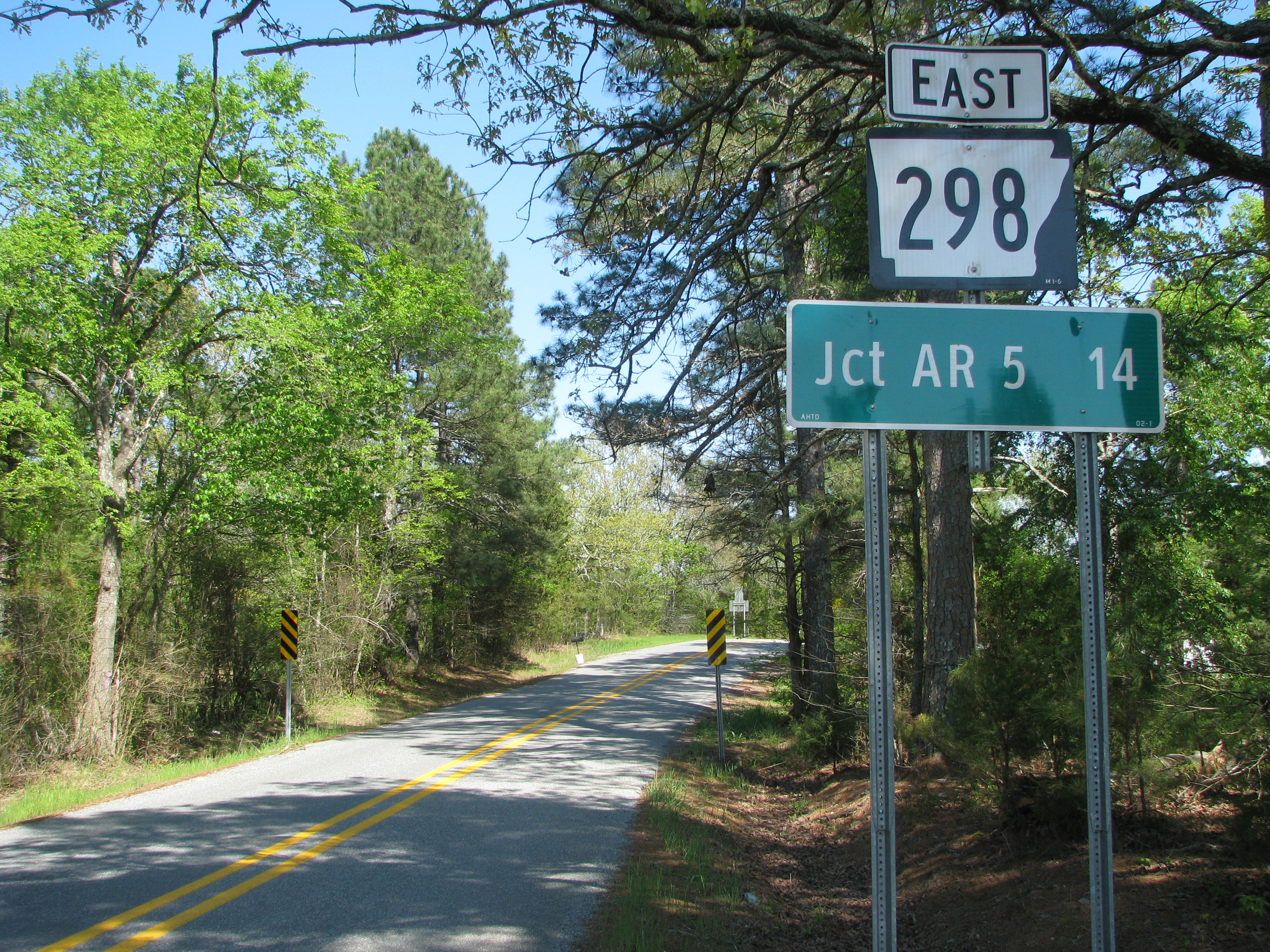
Highway 298's western terminus at Highway 9 near Paron, Arkansas.

The Saline County routing begins at Arkansas Highway 9 in unincorporated Saline County and runs southeast through Bland and Grape before terminating at Arkansas Highway 5 approximately 1 mile (1.6 km) north of Benton.

== Major intersections ==
County	Location	mi	km	Destinations	Notes
Montgomery	Sims	0.00	0.00	AR 88 – Pencil Bluff, Washita	Western terminus
Montgomery		3.71	5.97	US 270 – Mount Ida, Pencil Bluff	Eastern terminus
Montgomery	Highway 298 begins in Story				
Montgomery	Story	0.00	0.00	AR 27 – Mount Ida, Danville	Western terminus
Garland		28.39	45.69	AR 7 – Ola, Hot Springs	Eastern terminus
Highway 298 begins at Highway 5
Saline		0.00	0.00	AR 9 – Paron, Crows	Eastern terminus
Saline		13.81	22.23	AR 5 – Benton, Hot Springs	Western terminus
1.000 mi = 1.609 km; 1.000 km = 0.621 mi

== See also ==
- List of state highways in Arkansas
