= Mountain Pine School District =

School district in Arkansas

Location
- 734 Blakely Dam Road; Mountain Pine, Arkansas 71956 United States

District information
- Grades: PK–12
- Accreditation: Arkansas Department of Education
- Schools: 2
- NCES District ID: 0510170

Students and staff
- Students: 623
- Teachers: 53.97 (on FTE basis)
- Staff: 103.97 (on FTE basis)
- Student–teacher ratio: 11.54
- Athletic conference: 2A Region 5 (2012–14) 1A-2A Eight-Man Football State Champions(6-1)
- District mascot: Red Devil
- Colors: Red; White

Other information
- Website: www.mpsdrd.com

Mountain Pine School District 46 (MPSD) is a public school district based in Mountain Pine, Arkansas, United States. MPSD encompasses 73.04 square miles (189.2 km^{2}) of land in Garland County.

Its boundary includes Mountain Pine and a portion of Piney. A section of Hot Springs National Park is in the district. It also includes Royal.

It won the award for the 2020 1A-2A Eight-Man Football State Champions(6-1).

The school district serves more than 600 students with more than 100 faculty and staff at its two schools. The district and schools' mascot is the Red Devil with red and white serving as the colors.

== Schools ==
- Mountain Pine High School, serving more than 275 students in grades 7 through 12.
- Mountain Pine Elementary School, serving more than 325 students in prekindergarten through grade 6.
