= Montgomery County Courthouse (Arkansas) =

- U.S. National Register of Historic Places
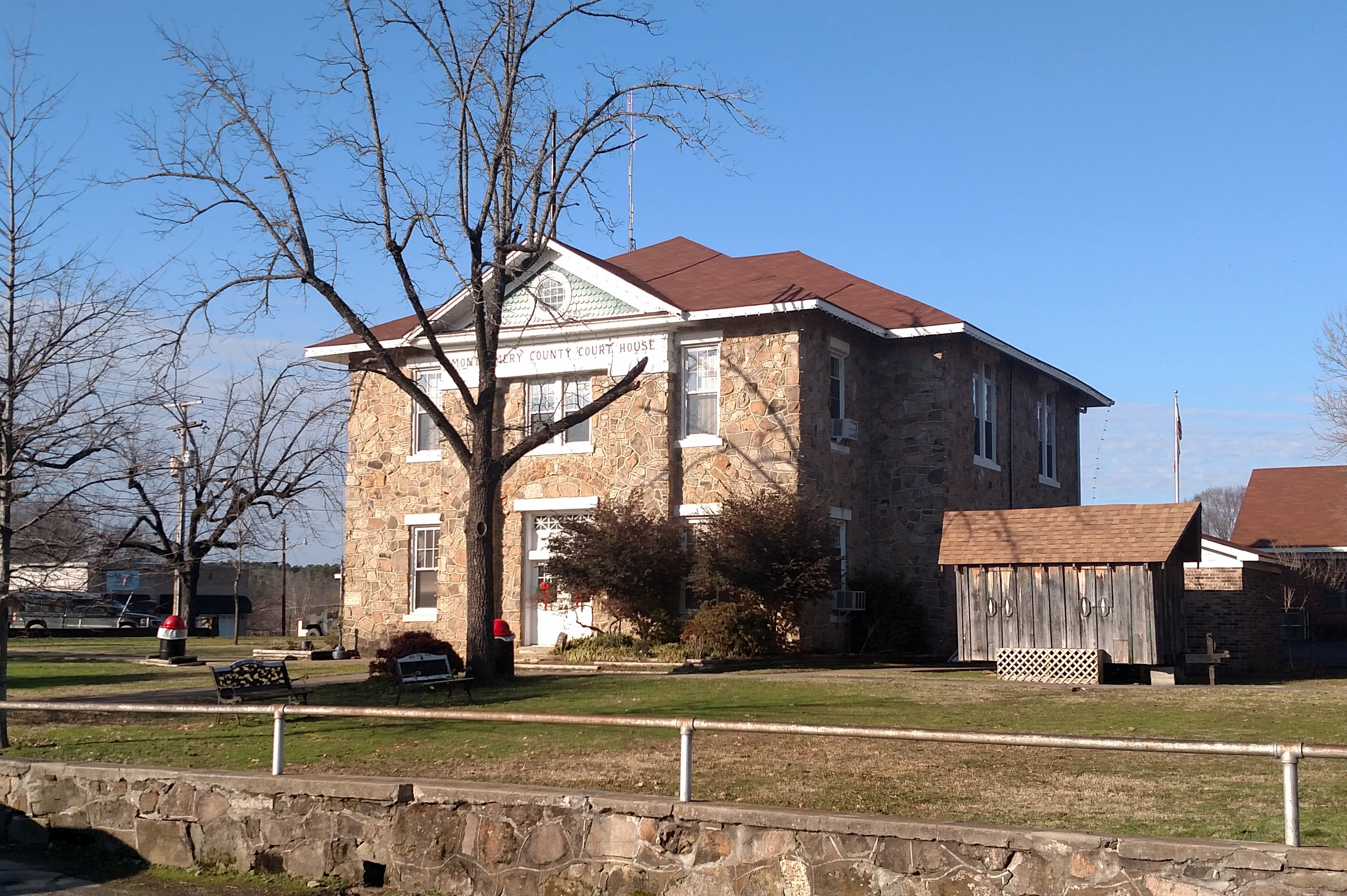

- Location within Arkansas Location within the United States
- Interactive map showing the location of Montgomery County Courthouse
- Location: Court Sq., Mount Ida, Arkansas
- Coordinates: 34°33′28″N 93°37′56″W
- Area: less than one acre
- Built: 1923
- Architect: Clyde A. Ferrel
- NRHP reference No.: 76000441
- Added to NRHP: August 27, 1976

The Montgomery County Courthouse is located at Court Square in the center of Mount Ida, the county seat of Montgomery County, Arkansas. It is a two-story masonry structure, distinctively blending local rustic character with Classical Revival styling. Its walls are fashioned out of randomly laid fieldstone, but features a projecting entry section with a fully pedimented gable with an oriel window at its center. The courthouse was built in 1923 to a design by Clyde A. Ferrel.

The building was listed on the National Register of Historic Places in 1976.

== See also ==
- National Register of Historic Places listings in Montgomery County, Arkansas
