= Jessieville High School =

Location
- 7900 North Highway 7 Jessieville, Garland County, Arkansas 71949; United States; 34°42′05″N 93°03′43″W

Information
- Status: Open
- School district: Jessieville School District
- NCES District ID: 0507920
- Oversight: Arkansas Department of Education
- CEEB code: 041235
- NCES School ID: 050792000516
- Grades: 9–12
- Enrollment: 259 (2023-2024)
- Student to teacher ratio: 8.93
- Education system: ADE Smart Core curriculum
- Classes offered: Regular, Advanced Placement
- Campus type: Rural
- Colors: Blue and white
- Athletics conference: 3A Region 5 (2012-14)
- Mascot: Lion
- Team name: Jessieville Lions
- Accreditation: AdvancED
- Affiliation: Arkansas Activities Association (AAA)
- Website: www.jsdlions.net/97749_3

Jessieville High School is a comprehensive public secondary school for students in grades 9 through 12, located in Jessieville, Arkansas, a city in Garland County. The school is the sole high school managed by the Jessieville School District.

== Academics ==
The assumed course of study for students follows the Smart Core curriculum developed by the Arkansas Department of Education (ADE), which requires students complete at least 22 units to graduate. Students engage in regular courses and exams and may take Advanced Placement (AP) coursework and exams with the opportunity for college credit. Jessieville High School offers several classes eligible for college credit in conjunction with National Park Community College.

== Extracurricular activities ==
The school mascot is the lion with blue and white serving as the school colors.

The Jessieville Lions are members of the 3A Classification administered by the Arkansas Activities Association competing in the 3A Region 5 Conference for interscholastic sporting activities. The Lions participate in team and individual events including: football, volleyball, golf (boys/girls), basketball (boys/girls), bowling (boys/girls), cross country (boys/girls), tennis (boys/girls), baseball, softball, and track and field (boys/girls).
