= Mountain Pine High School =

Location
- 726 Blakely Dam Road; Mountain Pine, Arkansas 71956; United States; 34°34′23″N 93°10′25″W

Information
- Type: Public Secondary Education
- CEEB code: 041745
- NCES School ID: 051017000746
- Teaching staff: 47.78 (on FTE basis)
- Grades: 7–12
- Enrollment: 294 (2023–2024)
- Student to teacher ratio: 6.15
- Colors: Red and white
- Mascot: Red Devil
- Team name: Mountain Pine Red Devils
- Website: www.mpsdrd.com

Mountain Pine High School is a public six-year high school located in Mountain Pine, Arkansas, United States. Mountain Pine is one of eight public high schools in Garland County and the only high school of the Mountain Pine School District. For 2010–11, the school enrollment was 279 students occupying grades 7 through 12.

== Academics ==
The assumed course of study follows the Smart Core curriculum developed by the Arkansas Department of Education (ADE). Students complete regular (core and career focus) courses and exams and may select Advanced Placement (AP) coursework and exams that provide an opportunity for college credit. The school is accredited by the ADE.

== Athletics ==
The Mountain Pine team mascot and athletic emblem is the Red Devil with red and white serving as the school colors.

For 2012–14, the Mountain Pine Red Devils participate in the 2A Classification from the 2A Region 5 Conference, as administered by the Arkansas Activities Association. The Red Devils compete football, golf (boys/girls), bowling (boys/girls), cross country (boys/girls, basketball (boys/girls), cheer, dance, baseball, softball, and track and field (boys/girls).

- Football: The Red Devils football teams won consecutive state football championships in 1978 and 1979. The Red Devils won the first 1A-2A Eight-Man state football title in 2020.
- Bowling: The girls and boys bowling teams won a state bowling championship in 2007.
- Track and field: The girls track team won a state track and field championship in 1978.

== Notable alumni ==
- Bobby "Bobby Bones" Estell (1998) Entertainer/Radio Personality
