= Mount Ida High School =

Location
- 318 Whittington Street; Mount Ida, Arkansas 71957; United States; 34°33′25″N 93°38′15″W

Information
- Type: Public secondary education
- CEEB code: 041765
- NCES School ID: 050999000733
- Teaching staff: 30.43 (on FTE basis)
- Grades: 7–12
- Enrollment: 203 (2023–2024)
- Student to teacher ratio: 6.67
- Colors: Maroon and white
- Mascot: Lion
- Team name: Mount Ida Lions
- Website: mihs.mountidaschools.com

Mount Ida High School is a public six-year high school located in Mount Ida, Arkansas, United States. Mount Ida is one of three public high schools in Montgomery County and the only high school of the Mount Ida School District. For 2010–11, the school enrollment was 256 students occupying grades 7 through 12.

== Academics ==
The assumed course of study follows the Smart Core curriculum developed by the Arkansas Department of Education (ADE). Students complete regular (core and career focus) courses and exams and may select Advanced Placement (AP) coursework and exams that provide an opportunity for college credit. The school is accredited by the ADE.

== Athletics ==
The Mount Ida team mascot and athletic emblem is the Lion with maroon and white serving as the school colors.

For 2012–14, the Mount Ida Lions participate in the 2A Classification from the 2A Region 4 Conference, as administered by the Arkansas Activities Association. The Lions compete football, golf (boys/girls), basketball (boys/girls), cheer, dance, baseball, softball, and track and field (boys/girls).
