= Jessieville School District =

School district in Arkansas, United States

Address
- 7900 North Highway 7 Jessieville, Arkansas, 71949; United States

District information
- Type: Public
- Grades: PreK–12
- NCES District ID: 0507920

Students and staff
- Students: 845
- Teachers: 64.46
- Staff: 77.0
- Student–teacher ratio: 13.11

Other information
- Website: jsdlions.net

Jessieville School District is a school district in Garland County and Saline County. It includes sections of Hot Springs Village.

== Schools ==
The District includes:

- Jessieville Elementary School
- Jessieville Middle School
- Jessieville High School
