= Jessieville, Arkansas =

Unincorporated community in Arkansas, US

Coordinates: 34°42′04″N 93°03′42″W

Jessieville is a Town located in Garland County, Arkansas, United States. It is located next to Hot Springs Village the Gated Subdivision and north of Hot Springs. Highway 7 runs through the Town, and Highway 298 is also inside the town. The town has one school campus, which contains an elementary school, a middle school and a high school. A post office, a Walmart and 6 gas station. As well as the Mountain Valley water Facilities. 2 grocery stores, a library and a dollar general. Jessieville is the founding Town of the area and built the subdivision of Hot Springs Village.

== Demographics ==
Jessieville's population as of 2014 was 2,467, increasing from 1,412 in 1990 and 1989 in 2010. Median age in the Jessieville zip code (71949) is 29 years (U.S. Median is 37.2).

Year	Population
1990	1,412
2000	1,989
2010	2,467

The population is 51.2% male and 48.8% female. There are 865 households with an average size of 2.85 people. Of those, 62.58% are categorized as Married Households, 8.04% Divorced with the remaining 29.38% Single. The community identifies as 99.43% white and .57% Native American, with no other ethnicities represented.

== Geography ==
The land area of the Jessieville community is 207.935 sq. miles with a water area of 27.79 sq. miles.

== Education ==
Public education for elementary and secondary school students is provided by the following:

- Jessieville School District, which leads to graduation from Jessieville High School.
