= Lake Ouachita State Park =

Park in Arkansas, United States

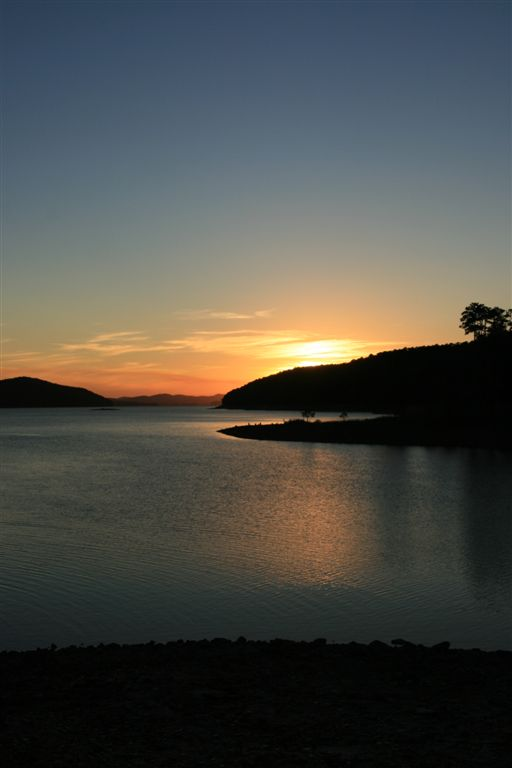

- Location within Arkansas Location within the United States
- Interactive map of Lake Ouachita State Park
- Location: Garland County, Arkansas, United States
- Coordinates: 34°37′07″N 93°10′38″W
- Area: 360 acres (150 ha)
- Elevation: 577 feet (176 m)
- Established: 1953; opened 1955
- Administrator: Arkansas Department of Parks, Heritage and Tourism
- Website: Official website
- Arkansas State Parks

Lake Ouachita State Park is a 360-acre (150 ha) public recreation area located ten miles (16 km) northwest of Hot Springs, on the eastern side of Lake Ouachita, which at 40,000 acres (16,000 ha) is the largest man-made lake located entirely within the state of Arkansas. In addition to its recreational offerings, the park preserves the site of the historic Three Sisters springs which were once touted for the curative properties of their mineral waters.

== Activities and amenities ==
Park amenities include a visitors' center, restaurant, cabins and campsites, marina, swimming area, hiking trails, boat ramps, and interpretive exhibits.
