= Lake Ouachita =

Lake in Ouachita mountains

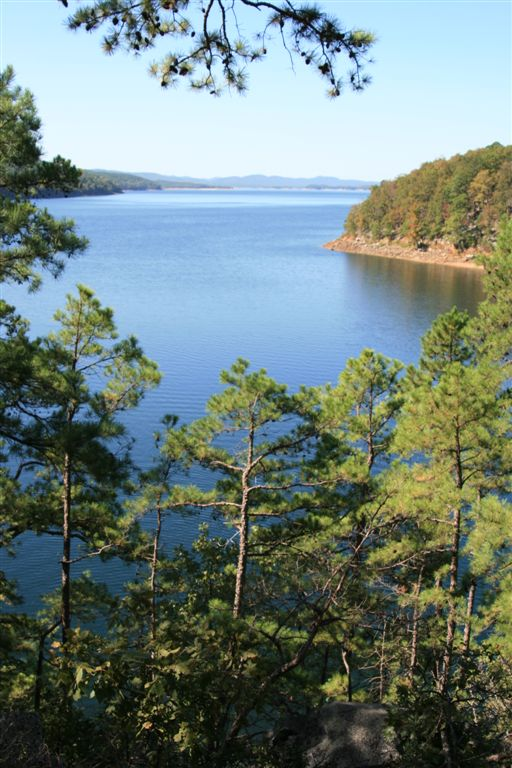

- Location within Arkansas
- Location: Garland and Montgomery counties, Arkansas
- Coordinates: 34°36′N 93°20′W
- Type: Hydro-Electric Reservoir
- Primary inflows: Ouachita River
- Primary outflows: Ouachita River
- Basin countries: United States
- Surface area: 40,000 acres (16,000 ha)
- Average depth: Avg 50 ft (15 m)
- Max. depth: 406 ft (124 m)
- Shore length^{1}: 690 mi (1,110 km)
- Frozen: Does not freeze
- Islands: 200
- Settlements: Hot Springs
- ^{1} Shore length is not a well-defined measure.

Lake Ouachita (Pronounced WAH-shi-tah) is a reservoir created by the damming of the Ouachita River by Blakely Mountain Dam (34°34′21″N 93°11′39″W).

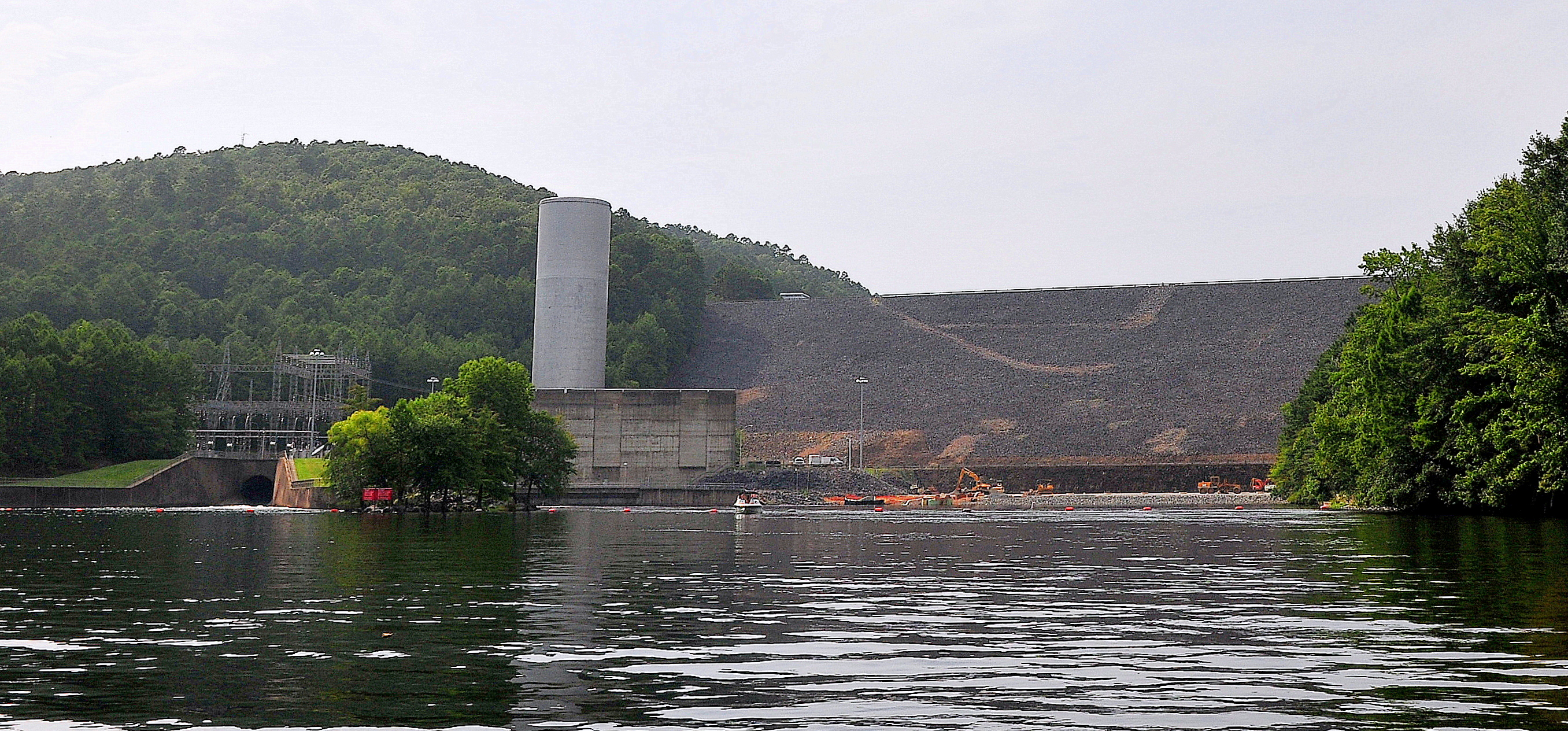
The Downstream side of Blakely Mountain Dam as photographed from the river on July 25, 2009

Blakely Mountain Dam was built by the United States Army Corps of Engineers from 1948 to 1953 for hydroelectric power, recreation, water supply and wildlife conservation. The dam is 231 feet (70 m) tall, 1,100 feet (340 m) long at the crest, and is capable of 75 megawatts.

The lake is located near Hot Springs, Arkansas. Lake Ouachita is the largest lake completely in Arkansas, as the larger Bull Shoals Lake extends into Missouri. Lake Ouachita has over 690 miles (1,110 km) of shoreline and over 66,324 acres (26,840 ha) of water. It is completely surrounded by the Ouachita National Forest. Lake Ouachita is located near two other lakes, Lake Hamilton and Lake Catherine. These three lakes, DeGray Lake to the near south, and the thermal springs of Hot Springs National Park make Hot Springs a popular tourist getaway.

Largemouth Bass, Small Mouth Bass, Spotted Bass, Bream, Crappie, Catfish, Walleye and world class Trophy Striped Bass await the angler. Lake Ouachita has rare jellyfish (non-stinging) and sponges found in very few freshwater lakes. Scuba divers from all over the world enjoy the underwater experience as well as the special spear fishing season.

The original purpose of Lake Ouachita was flood control and hydroelectricity. One feature by the Corps of Engineers is the Geo-Float Trail, a marked trail which can be followed with a brochure which details prominent geological features along the route. Lake Ouachita features one of the largest crystal veins in the world.

Vegetation covers 10% of the lake. Lake Ouachita's vegetation is being addressed by the U.S. Army Corps of Engineers, the Arkansas Game and Fish Commission, and the Lake Ouachita Association to control the hydrilla and Eurasian watermilfoil. The goal of the project is to contain and reduce — not to eradicate — the vegetation, since the presence of aquatic vegetation in moderate amounts is beneficial to the lake's fishery. Treatment will be concentrated on high recreational use areas, such as swimming beaches, around marinas and popular boating areas. Areas of the lake with good fish habitat will not be treated.

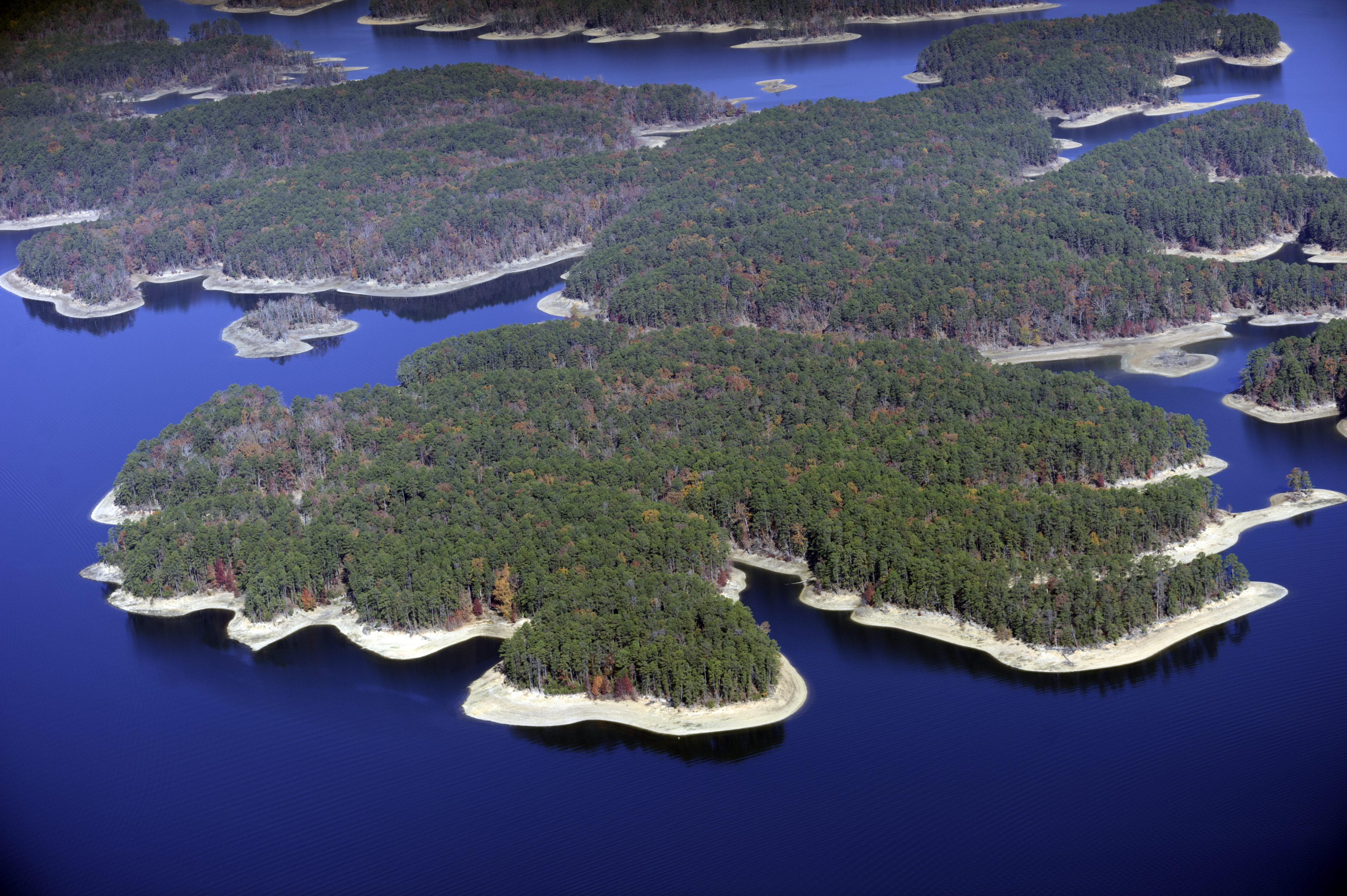
Aerial view of Lake Ouachita, looking towards the West

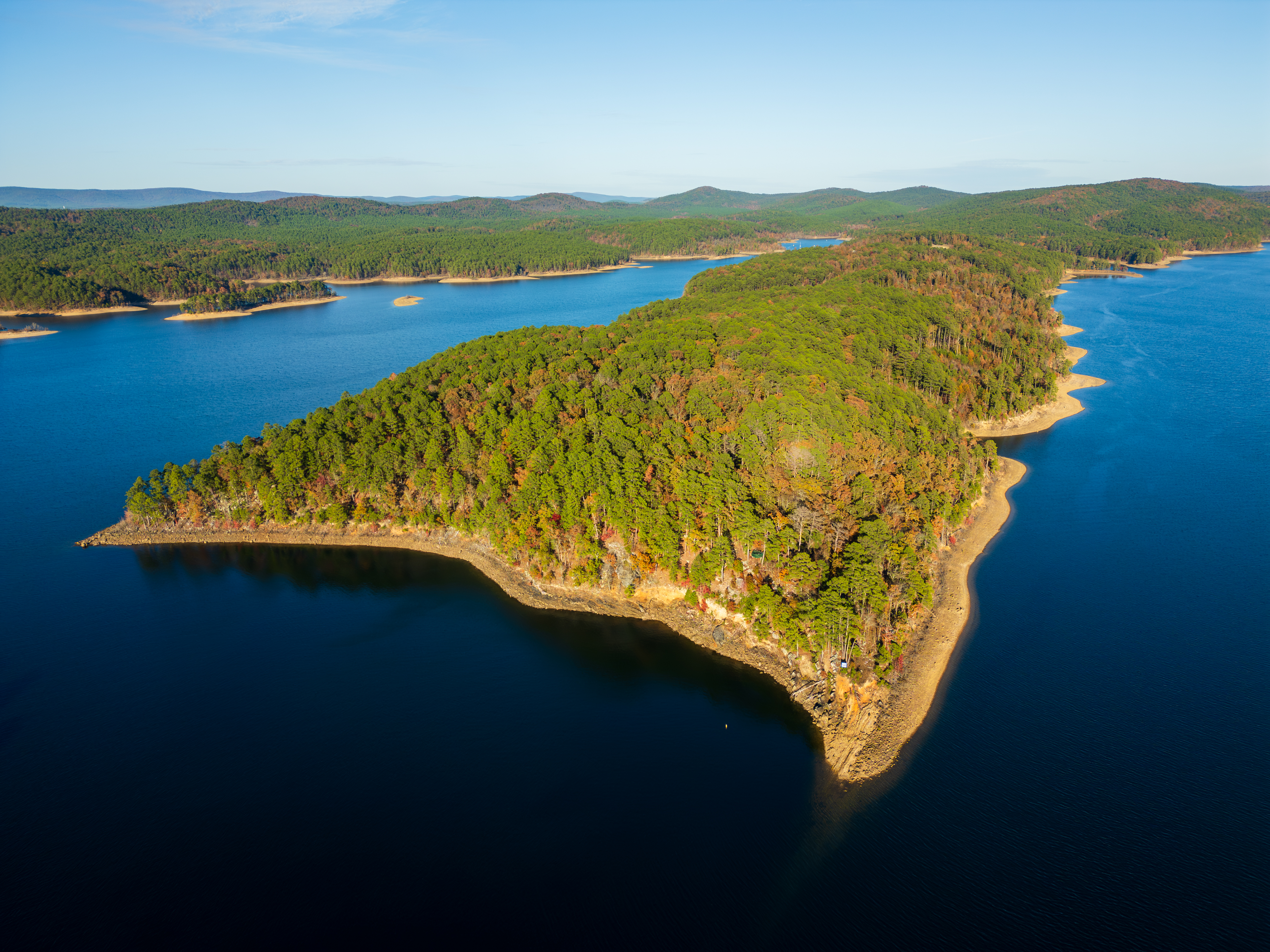
Aerial view of Lake Ouachita State Park and Caddo Bend Trail

== See also ==
- List of Arkansas dams and reservoirs
