= Royal, Arkansas =

Royal
- Location within Arkansas
- Coordinates: 34°30′41″N 93°14′28″W
- Country: United States
- State: Arkansas
- County: Garland
- Elevation: 489 ft (149 m)
- ZIP code: 71968
- Area code: 501
- GNIS feature ID: 73430

Royal is an unincorporated community in Garland County, Arkansas, United States. Royal is home to the only bronze foundry in Arkansas, Light and Time Design Studios.
