= Montgomery County, Arkansas =

County in Arkansas, United States

- County
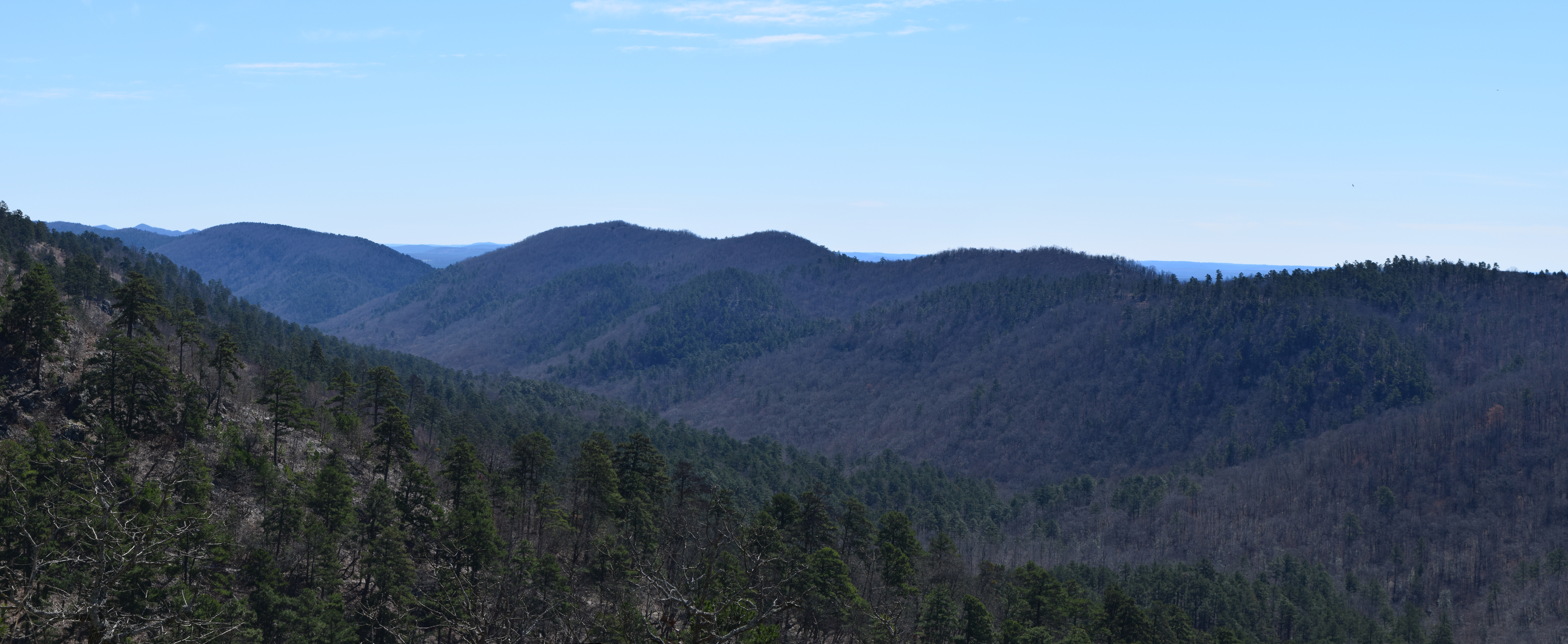
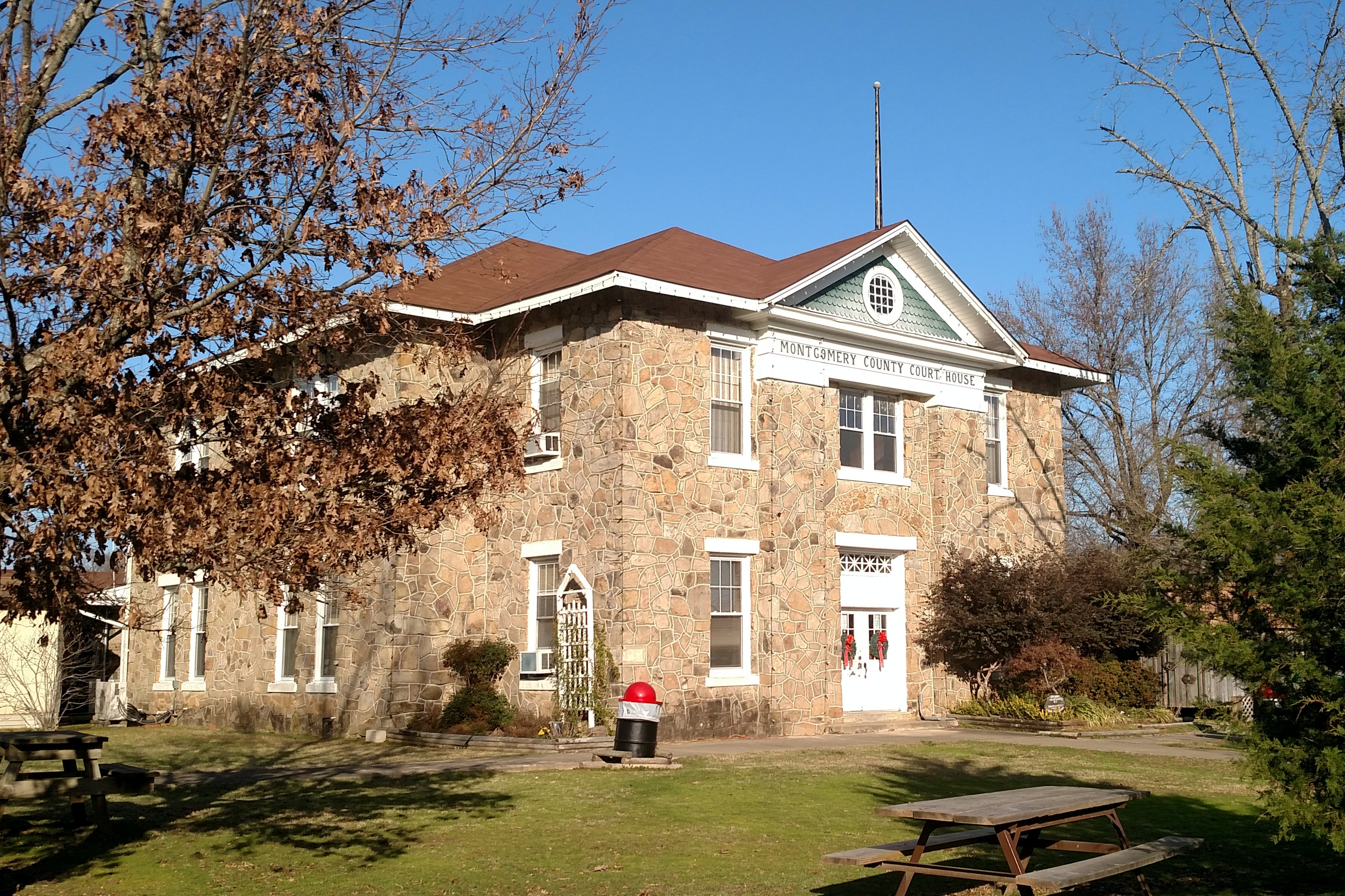
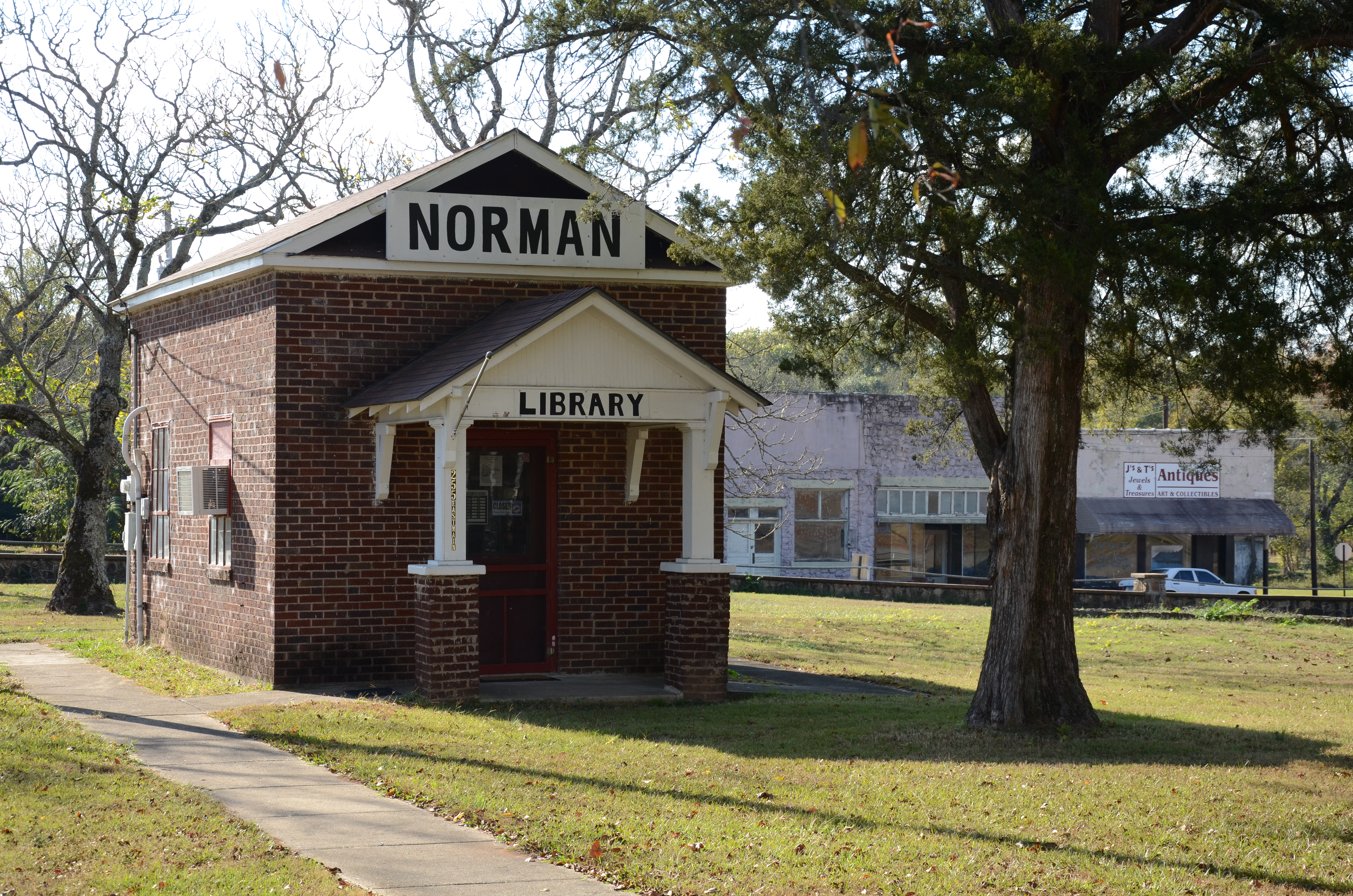
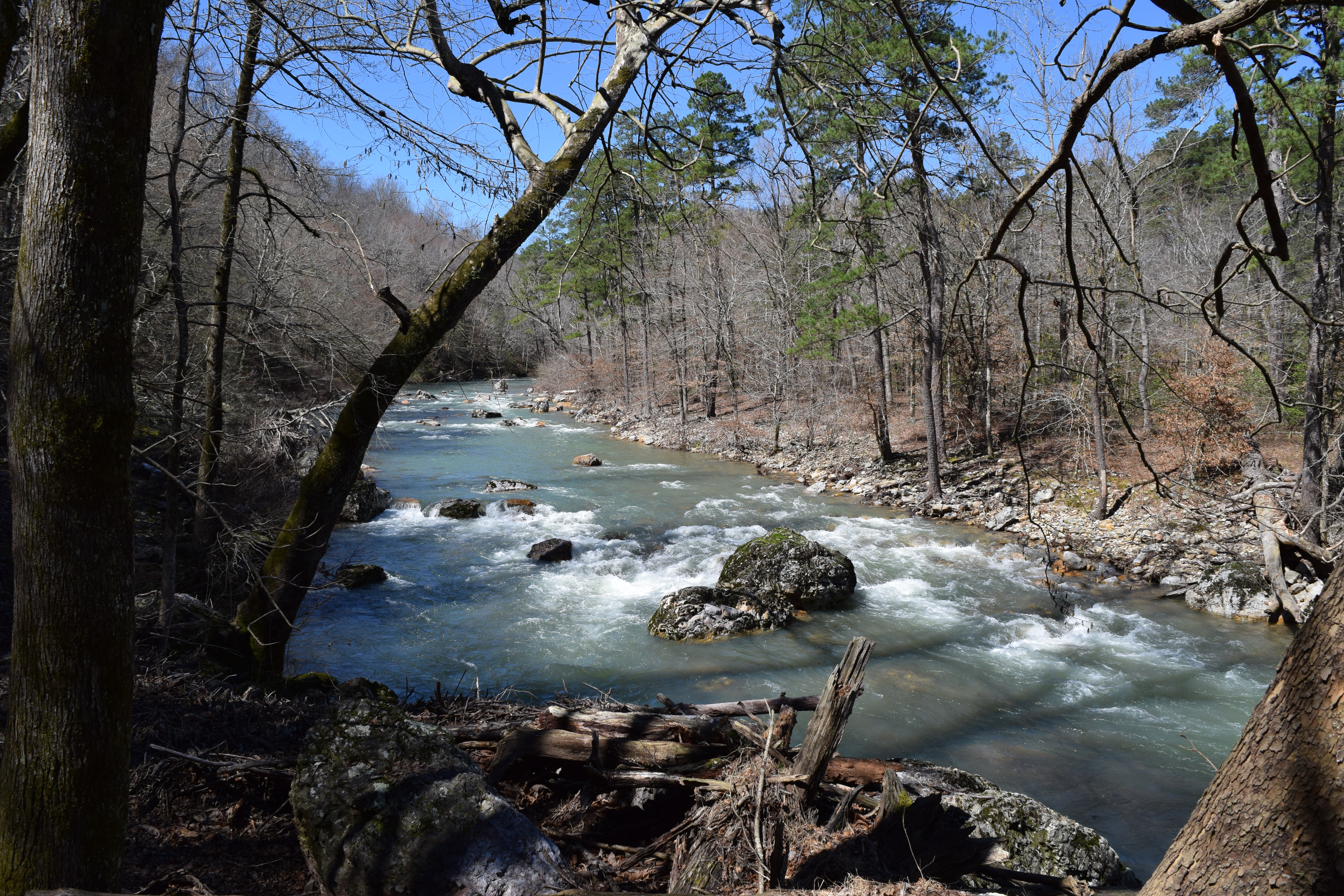
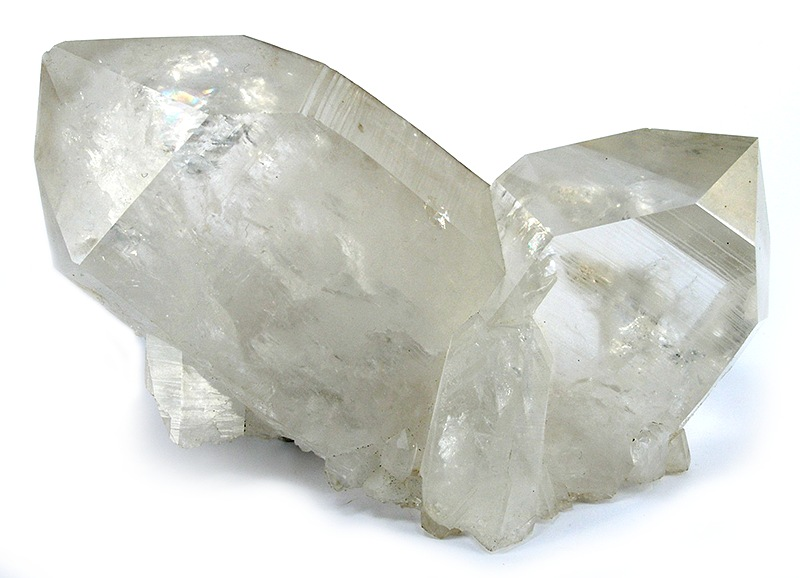
- Clockwise from top: Eagle Rock Vista in the Ouachita Mountains, the Norman Public Library, Quartz from a Montgomery County mine, the Little Missouri River, and the Montgomery County Courthouse in Mount Ida

- Location within the U.S. state of Arkansas
- Coordinates: 34°32′08″N 93°39′52″W
- Country: United States
- State: Arkansas
- Founded: December 9, 1842
- Named for: Richard Montgomery
- Seat: Mount Ida
- Largest city: Mount Ida

Area
  - Total: 800 sq mi (2,100 km^{2})
  - Land: 780 sq mi (2,000 km^{2})
  - Water: 20 sq mi (52 km^{2}) 2.6%

Population (2020)
  - Total: 8,484
  - Estimate (2025): 8,579 ▲
  - Density: 11/sq mi (4.2/km^{2})
- Time zone: UTC−6 (Central)
  - Summer (DST): UTC−5 (CDT)
- Congressional district: 4th
- Website: montgomerycounty.arkansas.gov

Montgomery County is a county in the Ouachita Mountains region of the U.S. state of Arkansas. As of the 2020 United States census, the population was 8,484. The county seat is Mount Ida. Montgomery County is Arkansas's 45th county, formed on December 9, 1842, and named after Richard Montgomery, an American Revolutionary War general.

== History ==
Stone spear and dart points found in the area verify that people from the Dalton tradition were present in Montgomery County around 8500 BC. Early signs of houses and American Indian cemeteries are present in and around Caddo Gap, Arkansas, indicating the definite presence of the Caddo Indians having settled in the area in the 13th century and 14th century. In 1541, the explorer Hernando de Soto fought the Tula Indians at Caddo Gap, and he was injured during that battle.

The first white settlers arrived in 1812, when Martin and Mary Collier settled what is now Caddo Gap. They befriended the local tribes, and seemingly had no problems from them whatsoever. Granville Whittington arrived in 1835, and built a road that led from Hot Springs, Arkansas to his farm about a mile north of the settlement of Montgomery. By 1836 when Arkansas received statehood, most of the native Indians were gone. Some of the native Indian women had intermingled and intermarried with local white settlers. Whittington opened a general store that drew customers from the surrounding area, and in 1842 he opened the Mount Ida Post Office in Mount Ida. West of the Ouachita River, settlers from a wagon train wintered in what is now Oden, and decided to stay when the weather cleared. Montgomery County was named after General Richard Montgomery, an American general who died during the American Revolution.

Originally part of the Louisiana Purchase, it was first claimed by Spain, then France, and in 1813 was part of Arkansas County, then in 1818 was part of Clark County. On December 9, 1842, Montgomery County became its own county, with Montgomery as its county seat. In 1850 Salem became the county seat, but later that same year the county seat changed again, to Mount Ida, where Whittington's Post Office was located. Mount Ida incorporated in 1854.

=== Civil War era ===
When the Civil War broke out, most of Montgomery County favored the Confederacy. Mount Ida settlers John Lavender and John Simpson formed one company to serve in the Confederate Army, and the 4th Arkansas Infantry Regiment originated in Mount Ida also, but after the war few from the company organized by Lavender and Simpson returned to Montgomery County. With mostly women left to tend to the farms, soldiers from both the Confederate and the Union Army raided homes and farms for supplies, leaving settlers with little to eat. After the war, soldiers from both armies settled in the area, building schools and homes. In 1884 Oden built a steam saw, a cotton gin and a gristmill.

=== Up to modern times ===
With the arrival of the Missouri Pacific Railroad in Caddo Gap around the turn of the 20th century, Caddo Gap and Black Springs began to thrive. In 1910 the county population reached its peak, with sawmills springing up in several locations. That same year, the town of Womble was settled. It changed its name to Norman in 1925. In 1918 the logging camp of Mauldin, Arkansas sprang up, and a railroad line was built to it from Norman. However, almost overnight in 1936, Mauldin closed up, dismantled everything, and moved on having depleted the virgin timber in the area. This, combined with the Great Depression, had a devastating effect on the county.

Many people moved away to find work elsewhere, while others found employment with the Civilian Conservation Corps. During World War II, people continued to leave Montgomery County, with the men going off to war, and others leaving to find employment in war plants. Mining became one source of local employment for a time, but did not last. Most mines were due to a large abundance of quartz in the county. In 1922 there were eighty three school districts in Montgomery County. Today there are three, Caddo Hills, Mount Ida, and Ouachita River. Cattle, swine, and poultry are now the main areas of employment in the region.

== Geography ==
According to the U.S. Census Bureau, the county has a total area of 800 square miles (2,100 km^{2}), of which 780 square miles (2,000 km^{2}) is land and 20 square miles (52 km^{2}) (2.6%) is water.

=== Major highways ===
- U.S. Highway 70
- U.S. Highway 270
- Highway 8
- Highway 27
- Highway 88
- Highway 182
- Highway 188
- Highway 240
- Highway 298
- Highway 369
- Highway 379
- Highway 949

=== Adjacent counties ===
- Yell County (north)
- Garland County (east)
- Hot Spring County (southeast)
- Clark County (southeast)
- Pike County (south)
- Howard County (southwest)
- Polk County (west)
- Scott County (northwest)

=== National protected area ===
- Ouachita National Forest (part)

== Demographics ==
Historical population
Census	Pop.	Note	%±
1850	1,958		—
1860	3,633		85.5%
1870	2,984		−17.9%
1880	5,729		92.0%
1890	7,923		38.3%
1900	9,444		19.2%
1910	12,455		31.9%
1920	11,112		−10.8%
1930	10,768		−3.1%
1940	8,876		−17.6%
1950	6,680		−24.7%
1960	5,370		−19.6%
1970	5,821		8.4%
1980	7,771		33.5%
1990	7,841		0.9%
2000	9,245		17.9%
2010	9,487		2.6%
2020	8,484		−10.6%
2025 (est.)	8,579	▲	1.1%
U.S. Decennial Census; 1790–1960 1900–1990; 1990–2000 2010

=== 2020 census ===
As of the 2020 United States census, the county had a population of 8,484. The median age was 50.6 years. 19.8% of residents were under the age of 18 and 26.8% of residents were 65 years of age or older. For every 100 females there were 98.0 males, and for every 100 females age 18 and over there were 95.5 males age 18 and over.

The racial makeup of the county was 89.3% White, 0.2% Black or African American, 1.2% American Indian and Alaska Native, 0.6% Asian, 0.1% Native Hawaiian and Pacific Islander, 2.7% from some other race, and 6.0% from two or more races. Hispanic or Latino residents of any race comprised 4.9% of the population.

Less than 0.1% of residents lived in urban areas, while 100.0% lived in rural areas.

There were 3,651 households in the county, of which 24.0% had children under the age of 18 living in them. Of all households, 51.4% were married-couple households, 19.9% were households with a male householder and no spouse or partner present, and 24.2% were households with a female householder and no spouse or partner present. About 30.8% of all households were made up of individuals and 17.0% had someone living alone who was 65 years of age or older.

There were 5,435 housing units, of which 32.8% were vacant. Among occupied housing units, 79.6% were owner-occupied and 20.4% were renter-occupied. The homeowner vacancy rate was 1.7% and the rental vacancy rate was 9.8%.

=== 2000 census ===
As of the 2000 United States census, there were 9,245 people, 3,785 households, and 2,747 families residing in the county. The population density was 12 people per square mile (4.6 people/km^{2}). There were 5,048 housing units at an average density of 6 per square mile (2.3/km^{2}). The racial makeup of the county was 95.42% White, 0.29% Black or African American, 1.11% Native American, 0.37% Asian, 0.01% Pacific Islander, 1.56% from other races, and 1.23% from two or more races. 2.53% of the population were Hispanic or Latino of any race.

There were 3,785 households, out of which 28.00% had children under the age of 18 living with them, 62.60% were married couples living together, 7.00% had a female householder with no husband present, and 27.40% were non-families. 24.50% of all households were made up of individuals, and 12.20% had someone living alone who was 65 years of age or older. The average household size was 2.41 and the average family size was 2.85.

In the county, the population was spread out, with 23.50% under the age of 18, 6.20% from 18 to 24, 25.00% from 25 to 44, 26.30% from 45 to 64, and 18.90% who were 65 years of age or older. The median age was 42 years. For every 100 females there were 96.20 males. For every 100 females age 18 and over, there were 95.00 males.

The median income for a household in the county was $28,421, and the median income for a family was $32,769. Males had a median income of $25,865 versus $18,063 for females. The per capita income for the county was $14,668. About 13.00% of families and 17.00% of the population were below the poverty line, including 22.50% of those under age 18 and 16.00% of those age 65 or over.

== Government ==
=== Government ===
The county government is a constitutional body granted specific powers by the Constitution of Arkansas and the Arkansas Code. The quorum court is the legislative branch of the county government and controls all spending and revenue collection. Representatives are called justices of the peace and are elected from county districts every even-numbered year. The number of districts in a county vary from nine to fifteen, and district boundaries are drawn by the county election commission. The Montgomery County Quorum Court has nine members. Presiding over quorum court meetings is the county judge, who serves as the chief operating officer of the county. The county judge is elected at-large and does not vote in quorum court business, although capable of vetoing quorum court decisions.

Montgomery County, Arkansas Elected countywide officials
Position	Officeholder	Party
County Judge	Bart Williams	Republican
County/Circuit Clerk	Regina Powell	Republican
Sheriff/Collector	Neal Thomas	Republican
Treasurer	Missy Keenom	Republican
Assessor	Tammy McCarter	Republican
Coroner	Jeffery Blansett	Republican

The composition of the Quorum Court following the 2024 elections is 9 Republicans. Justices of the Peace (members) of the Quorum Court following the elections are:

- District 1: Susan James (R)
- District 2: Tommy Beshears (R)
- District 3: Matt Rae (R)
- District 4: Steve Irwin (R)
- District 5: Kenn C. Greene (R)
- District 6: Melissa Powell (R)
- District 7: Nathan Howell (R)
- District 8: Tonya Roberts (R)
- District 9: David W. McCarter (R)

Additionally, the townships of Montgomery County are entitled to elect their own respective constables, as set forth by the Constitution of Arkansas. Constables are largely of historical significance as they were used to keep the peace in rural areas when travel was more difficult. The township constables as of the 2024 elections are:

- Central District: Joshua Sublett (R)
- South District: Brandon Vines (R)

=== Politics ===
Over the past few election cycles Montgomery County has trended heavily towards the GOP. The last Democrat (as of 2024) to carry this county was Bill Clinton in 1996.

United States presidential election results for Montgomery County, Arkansas
Year	Republican		Democratic		Third party(ies)	
Year	No.	%	No.	%	No.	%
1896	220	17.92%	1,008	82.08%	0	0.00%
1900	293	38.15%	468	60.94%	7	0.91%
1904	491	56.50%	342	39.36%	36	4.14%
1908	522	43.98%	553	46.59%	112	9.44%
1912	221	21.44%	471	45.68%	339	32.88%
1916	432	31.51%	939	68.49%	0	0.00%
1920	615	54.96%	430	38.43%	74	6.61%
1924	360	40.82%	431	48.87%	91	10.32%
1928	976	56.91%	726	42.33%	13	0.76%
1932	211	12.13%	1,495	85.97%	33	1.90%
1936	465	30.61%	1,034	68.07%	20	1.32%
1940	400	28.23%	1,012	71.42%	5	0.35%
1944	349	37.77%	573	62.01%	2	0.22%
1948	236	18.99%	935	75.22%	72	5.79%
1952	815	50.25%	807	49.75%	0	0.00%
1956	965	52.76%	846	46.25%	18	0.98%
1960	836	49.85%	788	46.99%	53	3.16%
1964	832	37.78%	1,358	61.67%	12	0.54%
1968	885	35.04%	649	25.69%	992	39.27%
1972	1,555	68.17%	688	30.16%	38	1.67%
1976	924	27.63%	2,420	72.37%	0	0.00%
1980	1,585	43.88%	1,878	51.99%	149	4.13%
1984	2,221	59.12%	1,497	39.85%	39	1.04%
1988	1,752	55.99%	1,362	43.53%	15	0.48%
1992	1,205	32.46%	1,904	51.29%	603	16.24%
1996	1,137	32.86%	1,830	52.89%	493	14.25%
2000	2,128	56.91%	1,438	38.46%	173	4.63%
2004	2,367	59.80%	1,524	38.50%	67	1.69%
2008	2,365	65.30%	1,092	30.15%	165	4.56%
2012	2,369	69.59%	920	27.03%	115	3.38%
2016	2,643	74.26%	748	21.02%	168	4.72%
2020	3,046	78.65%	731	18.87%	96	2.48%
2024	2,987	80.58%	645	17.40%	75	2.02%

== Communities ==
=== Cities ===
- Mount Ida (county seat)

=== Towns ===
- Black Springs
- Norman
- Oden

=== Census-designated places ===
- Caddo Gap
- Pencil Bluff

=== Townships ===
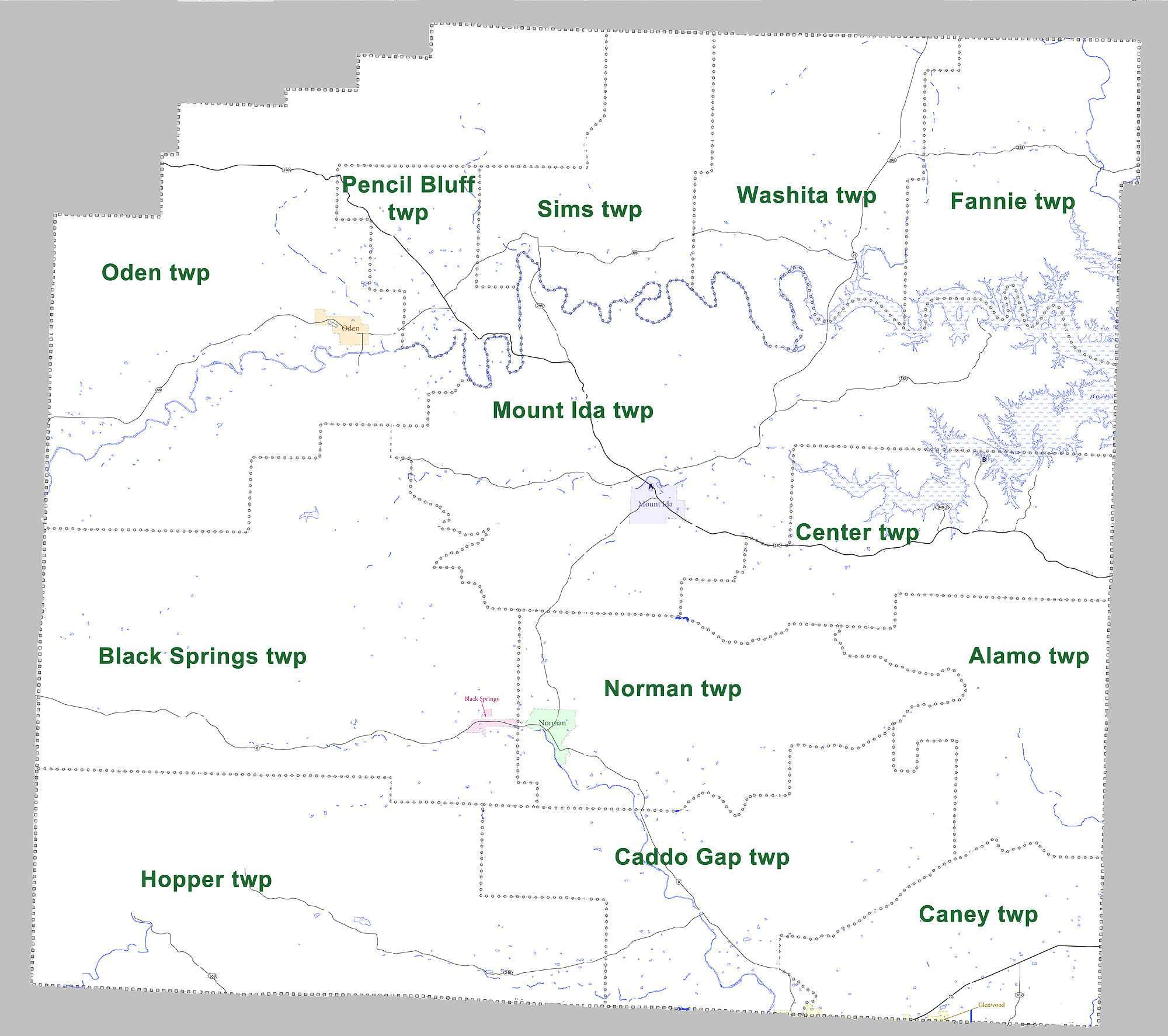
Townships in Montgomery County, Arkansas as of 2010

Townships in Arkansas are the divisions of a county. Each township includes unincorporated areas; some may have incorporated cities or towns within part of their boundaries. Arkansas townships have limited purposes in modern times. However, the United States census does list Arkansas population based on townships (sometimes referred to as "county subdivisions" or "minor civil divisions"). Townships are also of value for historical purposes in terms of genealogical research. Each town or city is within one or more townships in an Arkansas county based on census maps and publications. The townships of Montgomery County are listed below; listed in parentheses are the cities, towns, and/or census-designated places that are fully or partially inside the township.

- Alamo
- Black Springs (Black Springs)
- Caddo Gap
- Caney (small parts of Glenwood)
- Center
- Fannie
- Hopper
- Mount Ida (Mount Ida)
- Norman (Norman)
- Oden (Oden)
- Pencil Bluff
- Sims
- Washita

== Notable people ==
- Osro Cobb, (1904–1996), Republican member of the Arkansas House of Representatives from 1927 to 1930; later the state Republican chairman, and the United States Attorney for the Eastern District of Arkansas during the Little Rock Integration Crisis
- Mack Ray Edwards (1918–1971), child sex abuser/serial killer; committed suicide by hanging in his prison cell
- Lon Warneke, (1909–1976), Major League Baseball pitcher for the Chicago Cubs and St. Louis Cardinals, was born in Mount Ida.

== See also ==
- National Register of Historic Places listings in Montgomery County, Arkansas
