= Mount Ida, Arkansas =

- City
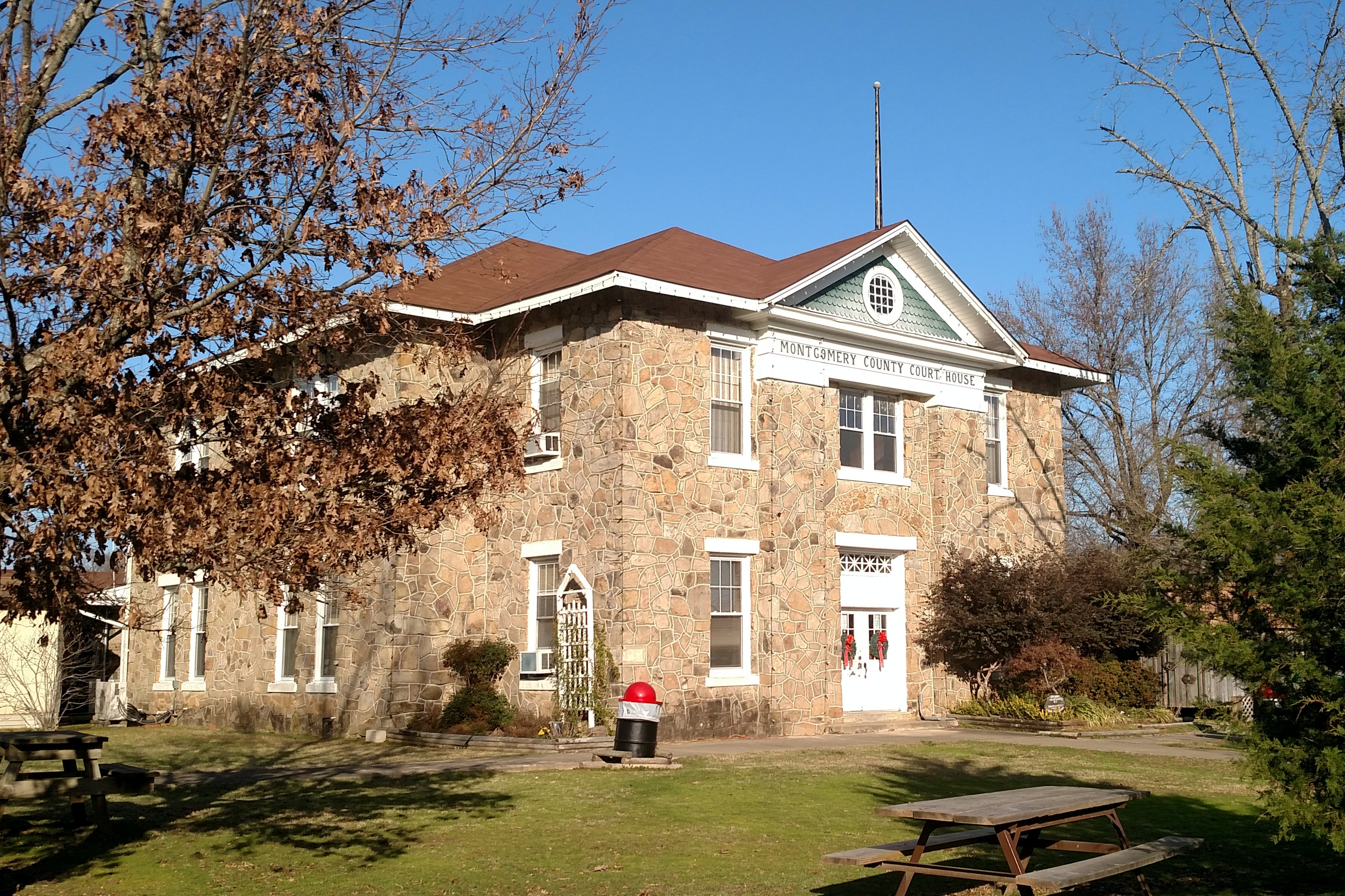
- Montgomery County Courthouse in downtown Mount Ida
- Motto: "Quartz Crystal Capital of the World"
- Location in Montgomery County, Arkansas
- Coordinates: 34°33′03″N 93°37′35″W
- Country: United States
- State: Arkansas
- County: Montgomery
- Incorporated (city): May 30, 1890

Area
  - Total: 1.60 sq mi (4.14 km^{2})
  - Land: 1.57 sq mi (4.06 km^{2})
  - Water: 0.031 sq mi (0.08 km^{2})
- Elevation: 659 ft (201 m)

Population (2020)
  - Total: 996
  - Estimate (2025): 1,005 ▲
  - Density: 634.7/sq mi (245.06/km^{2})
- Time zone: UTC-6 (Central (CST))
  - Summer (DST): UTC-5 (CDT)
- ZIP code: 71957
- Area code: 870
- FIPS code: 05-47690
- GNIS feature ID: 2404320

Mount Ida is a city in and the county seat of Montgomery County, Arkansas, United States. Founded in 1842, the city saw a silver boom in the 1880s bring early prosperity and economic development to the area.

Today, the economy is largely ranching, poultry farming, silviculture, and tourism around Lake Ouachita. It is known as the quartz crystal capital of the U.S. and is known worldwide for its quartz deposits. The population was 996 as of the 2020 census.

== History ==
Mount Ida was incorporated on May 30, 1890.

Episode 133, entitled "What's in my Pocket?", of the popular podcast Small Town Murder, hosted by James Pietragallo and Jimmie Whisman, featured Mount Ida on August 22, 2019.

== Geography ==
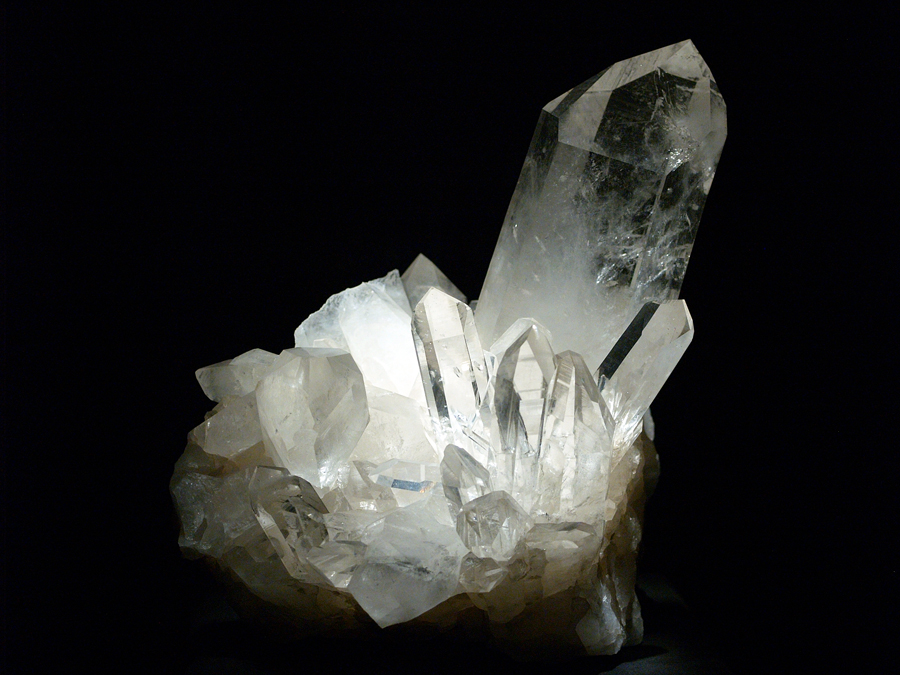
Arkansas quartz crystals

Mount Ida is located in central Montgomery County on the south bank of the South Fork of the Ouachita River. US Route 270 and Arkansas Highway 27 pass through the town. US 270 leads east 36 miles (58 km) to Hot Springs and northwest 86 miles (138 km) to Heavener, Oklahoma, while AR 27 leads northeast 46 miles (74 km) to Danville and southwest 9 miles (14 km) to Norman. Mount Ida, the mountain, is about 5 miles (8 km) southwest of the town along Route 27.

According to the United States Census Bureau, the city of Mount Ida has a total area of 1.60 square miles (4.14 km^{2}), of which 0.03 square miles (0.08 km^{2}), or 1.94%, are water.

=== Climate ===
The climate in this area is characterized by hot, humid summers and generally mild to cool winters. According to the Köppen Climate Classification system, Mount Ida has a humid subtropical climate, abbreviated "Cfa" on climate maps.

Climate data for Mount Ida, Arkansas (1991–2020 normals, extremes 1883–present)
Month	Jan	Feb	Mar	Apr	May	Jun	Jul	Aug	Sep	Oct	Nov	Dec	Year
Record high °F (°C)	87 (31)	86 (30)	91 (33)	93 (34)	97 (36)	108 (42)	110 (43)	116 (47)	107 (42)	100 (38)	89 (32)	83 (28)	116 (47)
Mean daily maximum °F (°C)	53.0 (11.7)	56.9 (13.8)	65.4 (18.6)	73.6 (23.1)	80.5 (26.9)	88.4 (31.3)	92.9 (33.8)	92.7 (33.7)	86.3 (30.2)	75.3 (24.1)	63.5 (17.5)	55.0 (12.8)	73.6 (23.1)
Daily mean °F (°C)	41.8 (5.4)	45.5 (7.5)	53.3 (11.8)	61.5 (16.4)	69.4 (20.8)	77.2 (25.1)	81.0 (27.2)	80.4 (26.9)	73.4 (23.0)	62.2 (16.8)	51.5 (10.8)	43.6 (6.4)	61.7 (16.5)
Mean daily minimum °F (°C)	30.7 (−0.7)	34.0 (1.1)	41.2 (5.1)	49.3 (9.6)	58.3 (14.6)	66.1 (18.9)	69.2 (20.7)	68.2 (20.1)	60.5 (15.8)	49.1 (9.5)	39.6 (4.2)	32.2 (0.1)	49.9 (9.9)
Record low °F (°C)	−15 (−26)	−21 (−29)	4 (−16)	20 (−7)	30 (−1)	41 (5)	47 (8)	43 (6)	31 (−1)	20 (−7)	6 (−14)	−6 (−21)	−21 (−29)
Average precipitation inches (mm)	3.81 (97)	4.04 (103)	5.01 (127)	6.17 (157)	5.44 (138)	4.77 (121)	4.20 (107)	3.66 (93)	4.14 (105)	4.44 (113)	5.25 (133)	4.82 (122)	55.75 (1,416)
Average precipitation days (≥ 0.01 in)	8.6	9.9	10.9	9.9	12.0	9.8	10.2	8.3	7.6	9.3	9.1	9.4	115.0
Source: NOAA

== Demographics ==
Historical population
Census	Pop.	Note	%±
1920	298		—
1930	512		71.8%
1940	490		−4.3%
1950	566		15.5%
1960	564		−0.4%
1970	819		45.2%
1980	1,023		24.9%
1990	775		−24.2%
2000	981		26.6%
2010	1,076		9.7%
2020	996		−7.4%
2025 (est.)	1,005	▲	0.9%
U.S. Decennial Census

=== 2020 census ===
Mount Ida racial composition
Race	Number	Percentage
White (non-Hispanic)	869	87.25%
Black or African American (non-Hispanic)	4	0.4%
Native American	16	1.61%
Asian	1	0.1%
Pacific Islander	3	0.3%
Other/Mixed	55	5.52%
Hispanic or Latino	48	4.82%

As of the 2020 United States census, there were 996 people, 428 households, and 273 families residing in the city.

=== 2000 census ===
As of the census of 2000, there were 981 people, 412 households, and 257 families residing in the city. The population density was 598.5 inhabitants per square mile (231.1/km^{2}). There were 471 housing units at an average density of 287.4 per square mile (111.0/km^{2}). The racial makeup of the city was 96.53% White, 0.10% Black or African American, 1.94% Native American, 0.31% Asian, 0.10% from other races, and 1.02% from two or more races. 0.51% of the population were Hispanic or Latino of any race.

There were 412 households, out of which 22.1% had children under the age of 18 living with them, 46.8% were married couples living together, 11.9% had a female householder with no husband present, and 37.6% were non-families. 35.4% of all households were made up of individuals, and 23.3% had someone living alone who was 65 years of age or older. The average household size was 2.15 and the average family size was 2.74.

In the city, the population was spread out, with 19.2% under the age of 18, 6.6% from 18 to 24, 18.3% from 25 to 44, 21.7% from 45 to 64, and 34.1% who were 65 years of age or older. The median age was 50 years. For every 100 females, there were 78.0 males. For every 100 females age 18 and over, there were 72.0 males.

The median income for a household in the city was $21,438, and the median income for a family was $30,714. Males had a median income of $25,875 versus $20,179 for females. The per capita income for the city was $13,532. About 18.9% of families and 23.4% of the population were below the poverty line, including 29.2% of those under age 18 and 16.0% of those age 65 or over.

== Parks and recreation ==
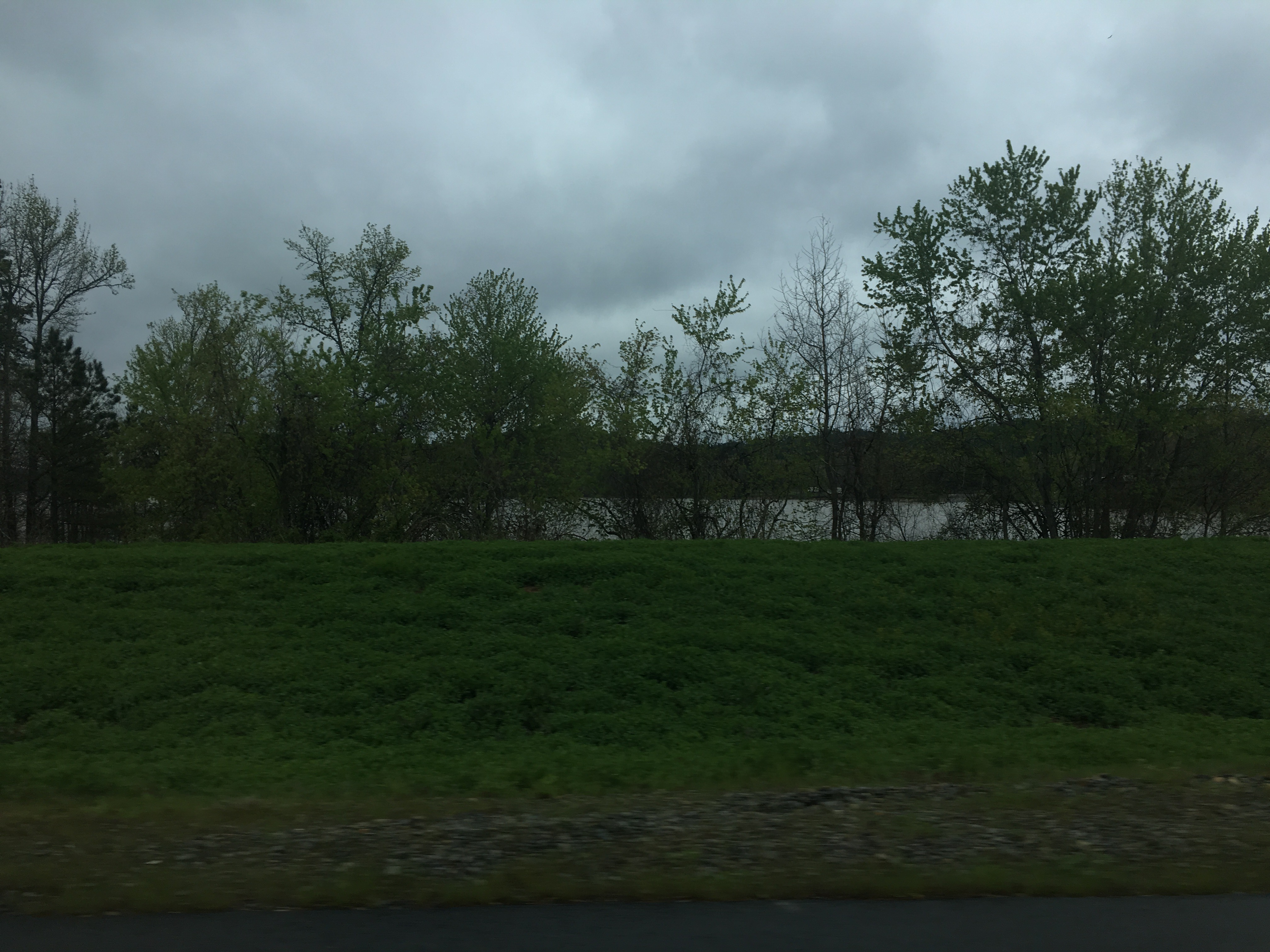
Lake Ouachita north of Mount Ida, Arkansas

The Ouachita National Forest is located in Montgomery County, and is close to Mount Ida. It is the South's oldest and largest national forest, and offers scenic areas like Little Missouri Falls, and hiking and backpacking trails. Lake Ouachita, one of the largest lakes in the region, is partially situated within Montgomery County.

== Notable people ==
- Mark Davis, professional sport fisherman of the Bass Anglers Sportsman Society; born in Mount Ida
- Lon Warneke, Major League Baseball player, Major League umpire; born in Mount Ida
- Charles L. Watkins, first Parliamentarian of the United States Senate; born and raised in Mount Ida
