= Arkansas Highway 296 =

State highway in Arkansas, United States

Highway 296

Route information
- Maintained by ArDOT
- Length: 25.68 mi (41.33 km)
- Existed: April 24, 1963–present

Major junctions
- West end: US 59 / US 71 in Texarkana
- US 67 near Texarkana
- East end: US 82

Location
- Country: United States
- State: Arkansas
- Counties: Miller

Highway system
- Arkansas Highway System; Interstate; US; State; Business; Spurs; Suffixed; Scenic; Heritage
← AR 295	→ AR 297

Highway 296 (AR 296, Ark. 296, and Hwy. 296) is an east–west state highway in Miller County. The route begins at US Highway 59 (US 59) and US 71 in Texarkana (State Line Avenue) and runs east to US 82 in the eastern part of the county. Highway 296 serves as an arterial street in Texarkana west of US 67, but is decidedly rural in its length east of US 67, passing through sparsely populated wooded areas typical of the Arkansas Timberlands. The highway was created on April 24, 1963, but was extended throughout the 1960s and 1970s during a period which Arkansas's state highway system grew greatly. Highway 296 is maintained by the Arkansas State Highway and Transportation Department (AHTD).

== Route description ==
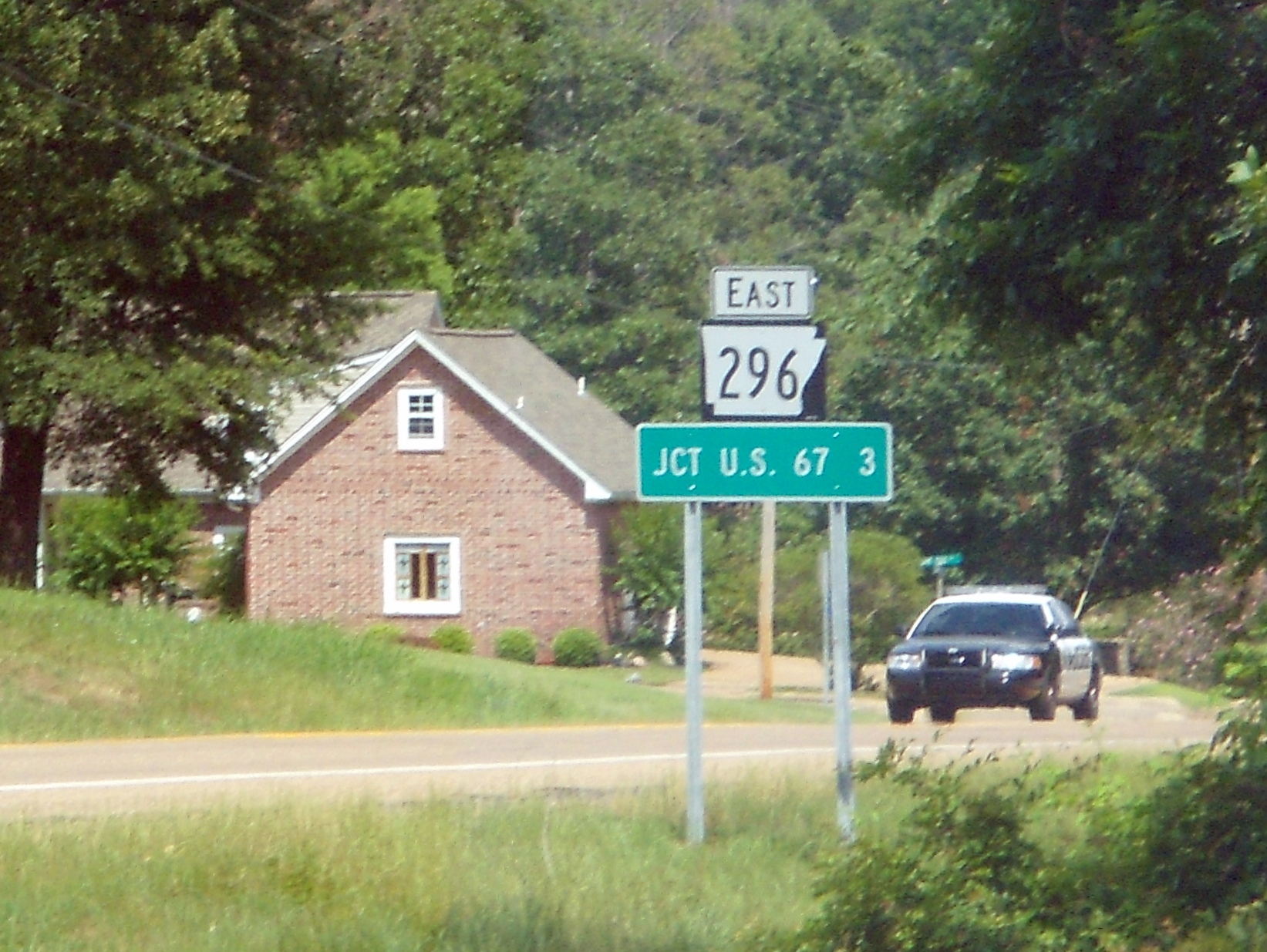
First Highway 296 reassurance marker east of the junction with Four States Fair Parkway in Texarkana

Highway 296 begins at US 59/US 71 in Texarkana (State Line Avenue) just east of the Texas state line. It travels east as Sugar Hill Road through low-density residential area, crossing under Interstate 49 (I-49) and over I-30 without connections to either. Just east of the Texarkana city limits, Highway 296 intersects US 67, beginning a concurrency south.

The pair reenters Texarkana, running south as Broad Street toward the Texarkana Regional Airport. Just north of the airport, Highway 296 ends the overlap with US 67 and turns east with Highway 237. After a short, 0.09 miles (0.14 km) overlap with Highway 237 east as Rondo Lane, Highway 296 turns northeast, following railroad tracks. The highway continues northeast for approximately 1 mile (1.6 km) before running due east as a section line road. Once east of the Texarkana city limits, Highway 296 begins to wind east through the Arkansas Timberlands countryside, roughly following Finn Bayou east to Hervey. Now very near the Red River and the Lafayette county line, the highway turns due south and intersects US 82 four miles (6.4 km) northwest of Garland, where it terminates.

== History ==
Highway 296 was created by the Arkansas State Highway Commission (ASHC) on April 24, 1963, by adopting a county road between US 67 at Mandeville and Hervey to the state highway system. On February 22, 1967, the ASHC authorized the AHTD to prepare plans for construction of an interchange between I-30 and Sugar Hill Road in Texarkana. On February 28, 1968, the ASHC extended Highway 296 to run between US 67 and I-30 as part of a program to connect newly built Interstate highways with the US highways they paralleled, despite the interchange requested to be studied in 1967 never coming to fruition. The highway was extended west to US 59/US 71 and east to US 82 in accordance with Act 9 of 1973 by the Arkansas General Assembly on June 28, 1973. The act directed county judges and legislators to designate up to 12 miles (19 km) of county roads as state highways in each county.

== Major intersections ==
Mile markers reset at some concurrencies. The entire route is in Miller County.

Location	mi	km	Destinations	Notes
Texarkana	0.00	0.00	US 59 / US 71 (State Line Avenue) – Ashdown, Texarkana	Western terminus of western segment
	4.64	7.47	US 67 north – Hope	Eastern terminus of western segment
Gap in route; see US 67 and AR 237
Texarkana	0.00	0.00	US 67 (Broad Street) / AR 237 south (Rondo Lane)	Western terminus of eastern segment
	21.04	33.86	US 82 – Texarkana, Lewisville	Eastern terminus of eastern segment
1.000 mi = 1.609 km; 1.000 km = 0.621 mi: Concurrency terminus
