= State Line Avenue =

Road in Texarkana, Texas–Arkansas, United States

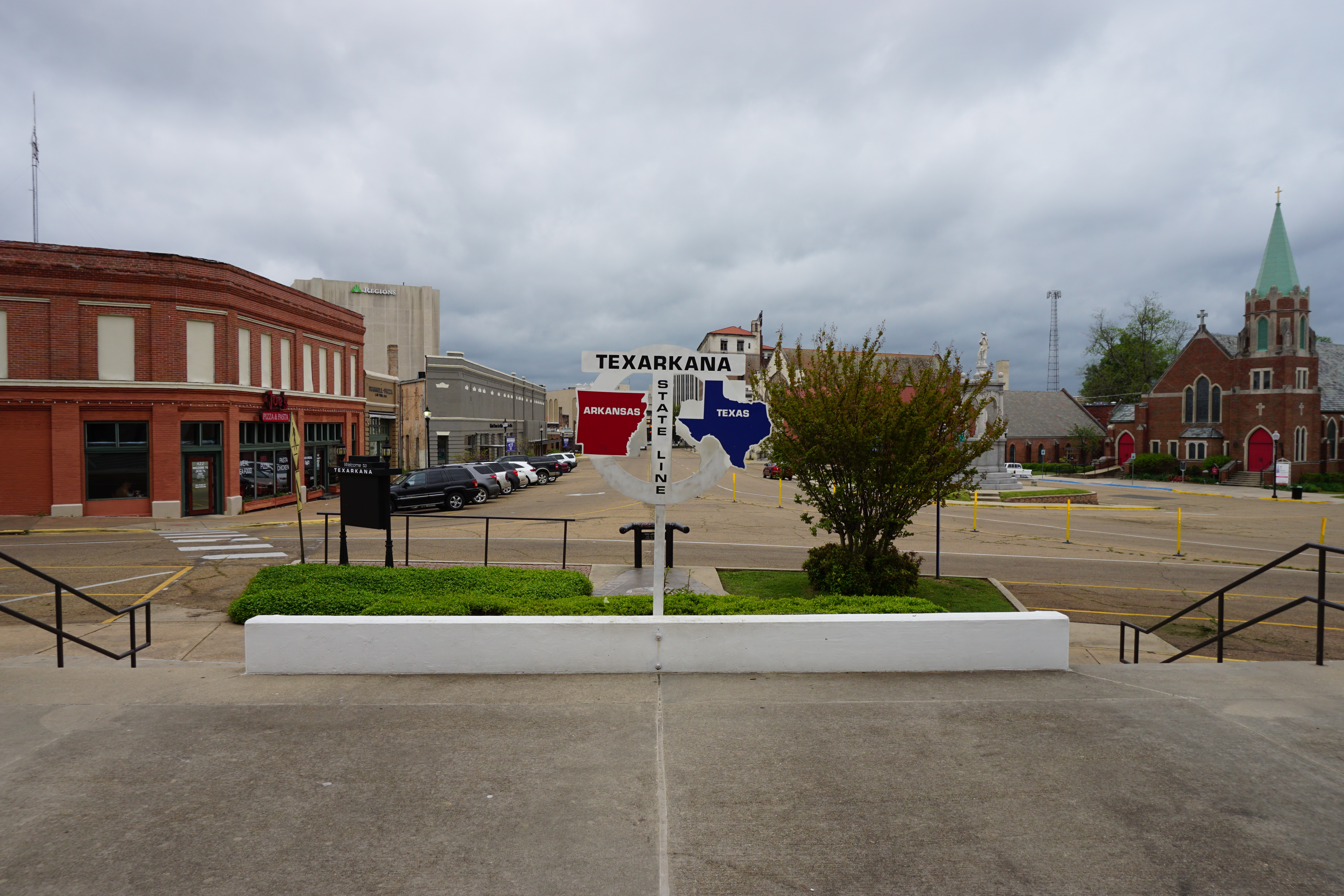
State Line Avenue divides Texarkana between Texas to the west and Arkansas to the east.

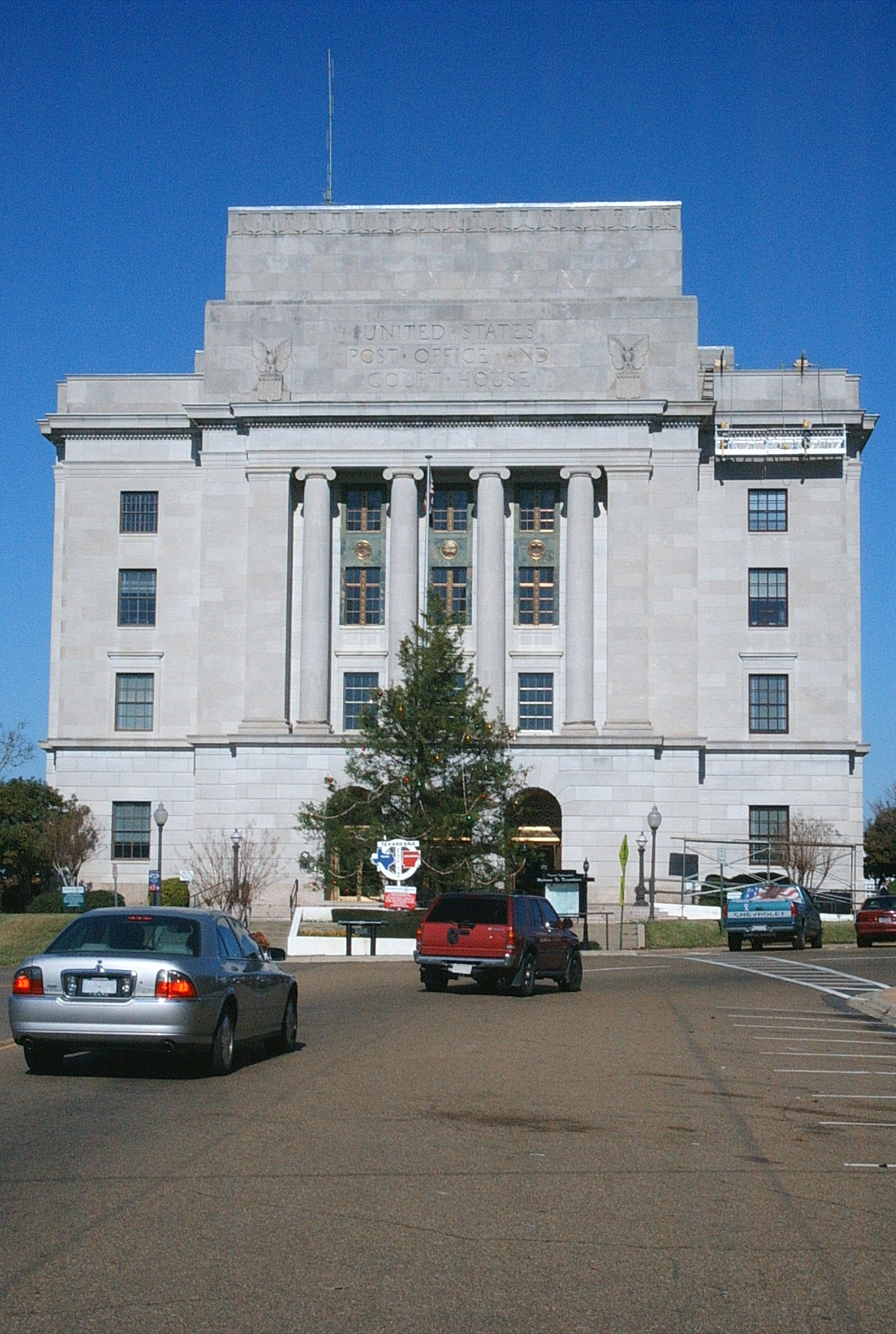
State Line Avenue is the site of Texarkana's Federal Building and Courthouse, which physically occupies two states.

State Line Avenue is a north–south arterial road in Texarkana, United States. It follows approximately 11 miles (18 km) of the Texas-Arkansas state line, and divides the cities. The street's centerline does not follow the state boundary precisely, but the southbound lanes of State Line Avenue are located in Texarkana, Texas (Bowie County), and the northbound lanes are in Texarkana, Arkansas (Miller County). State Line Avenue consists of two non-continuous portions, separated by a one-mile (1.6 km) gap directly south of the downtown area.

State Line Avenue's southern terminus is at Broad Street, but until 1980 it terminated at Texarkana Union Station. At the west end of downtown, the "Texas Viaduct" carries traffic over a rail yard to South State Line Avenue. Approximately five miles (8.0 km) south of the viaduct the road veers eastward, becoming Miller County Road 28, en route to Pleasant Hill.

From here, State Line Avenue continues north through downtown Texarkana, where the street splits apart and the traffic island in the middle is occupied by the city's U.S. Post Office and Federal Building, the only such building to be located in two states. One block north, State Line Avenue crosses US 67/US 71/US 82 and continues north carrying US 71, which intersects from the east only.

Because Bowie County, Texas, is a dry county, several liquor stores line the Arkansas side of midtown State Line Avenue. Customers from Texas regularly cross the state line to purchase alcoholic beverages. State Line Road travels north carrying US 71, lined with retail outlets, for about three miles (4.8 km) more before intersecting I-30. Here, there is a concentration of hotels dominating all four quadrants of the interchange, with over a dozen different lodging chains being represented here. Also at this interchange, US 59 ends its 3.5 miles (5.6 km) concurrency with I-30 by exiting the freeway from the west and traveling north along State Line Avenue/US 71.

Continuing north, State Line Avenue carries the US 59/US 71 concurrency until the Red River bridge.

== Major intersections ==
Texas			Arkansas		
← Denison		Red River		Fulton →	
← Northridge Country Club		Lakeridge Dr.	Sugar Hill Road	AR 296	AR 296 →
← Aledo	I-30 west	Interstate 30		I-30 east	North Little Rock →
← Laredo	US 59 south	Interstate 30			
← Loop 14	Loop 14 south	Texas Blvd	Arkansas Blvd	Texarkana Regional Airport →	
← Presidio	US 67 south	Dr. Martin Luther King, Jr. Blvd/ East 7th Street		US 67 north	Sabula →
← Alamogordo	US 82 west	Dr. Martin Luther King, Jr. Blvd/ East 7th Street		US 71 south	Krotz Springs →
		Dr. Martin Luther King, Jr. Blvd/ East 7th Street		US 82 east	Brunswick →
← Loop 151 to US 59	Loop 151 north to US 59 / I-369	The Loop		I-49 north	I-49 →
