= Loop (Texarkana) =

Highway in Texas and Arkansas

Texarkana Loop

Route information
- Length: 21.4 mi (34.4 km)
- Component highways: I-49; I-369; US 59; Loop 151 / AR 151

Major junctions
- North end: I-30 / US 59 in Texarkana, TX
- US 82 in Texarkana, TX; US 67 in Texarkana, TX; US 59 / SH 93 in Texarkana, TX; I-49 / US 71 in Texarkana, AR; US 71 in Texarkana, AR; US 82 in Texarkana, AR; I-30 in Texarkana, AR
- West end: US 59 / US 71 in Texarkana, AR

Location
- Country: United States
- States: Texas, Arkansas
- Counties: TX: Bowie; AR: Miller

Highway system
- Interstate Highway System; Main; Auxiliary; Suffixed; Business; Future
- United States Numbered Highway System; List; Special; Divided
- Highways in Texas; Interstate; US; State; Former; Toll; Loops; Spurs; FM/RM; Park; Rec
- Arkansas Highway System; Interstate; US; State; Business; Spurs; Suffixed; Scenic; Heritage

The Loop is a 21.4-mile-long (34.4 km) beltway around Texarkana, TX and Texarkana, AR, which are twin cities in the U.S. states of Arkansas and Texas. Consisting of a section of Interstate 49 (I-49) in Arkansas, and Loop 151 and a section of I-369 and U.S. Route 59 (US 59) in Texas, it forms a three-quarter loop around the east, south and west sides of the city. (I-30 completes the circle on the north side.) The Loop is built to Interstate Highway standards.

The south side is bisected by State Line Avenue, which travels north–south along the state line. The entire half in Arkansas is I-49, except for a small portion which carries Arkansas Highway 151 (AR 151). US 59 has an interchange with the Loop near the southwest corner, only the south side in Texas is Loop 151. Old US 59 into Texarkana (Lake Drive) is now Texas State Highway 93 (SH 93).

== Route description ==
The Loop consists of I-30, I-369, Loop 151, and AR 151. US 59 is concurrent with the beltway from the southwest corner of Texarkana to State Line Avenue. I-30 is the northern portion of the route, running north of both the twin cities. The eastern section of the Loop consists of I-49 and AR 151, and runs from US 59/71 north of I-30 to an interchange with I-49 on the southeast side of Texarkana. The southern section of the loop consists of Loop 151 and AR 151. It runs from I-49 in southeast Texarkana to I-369 in southwest Texarkana. The western section of the loop is formed by I-369. I-369 continues north on the western side of Texarkana to a stack interchange with I-30 in northwest Texarkana.

== History ==
Previously in Texas, the "151" designation was originally used for Spur 151, which was designated on May 18, 1944, from Denison to the southern boundary of the Federal Government Property. Spur 151 was cancelled on May 21, 1946, and instead replaced by SH 75A, which in turn became SH 91 on December 21, 1994. Loop 151 was designated on August 27, 1958, from I-30 to US 82. On January 20, 1966, Loop 151 extended south to US 59. On December 21, 1982, Loop 151 was transferred to US 59, so Loop 151 was reassigned to the old route of US 59. On February 7, 1985, Loop 151 was transferred to SH 93, so Loop 151 was reused for the route from US 59 to Arkansas, its current route.

In fall 2000, the Arkansas State Highway and Transportation Department had submitted its portion of the loop as Interstate 130 (I-130). However, the American Association of State Highway and Transportation Officials denied the part from US 71 west to Texas, as "the state of Texas has not submitted a companion application for a suitable terminus in Texas", but the piece from US 71 north to I-30 was approved on December 8, 2000, as Future I-130. Once it was upgraded to interstate standards and added to the Interstate Highway System by the Federal Highway Administration, it was to be signed as I-130. Arkansas used the American Recovery and Reinvestment Act of 2009 (ARRA) funds to pave the final segment of future I-130, from the Arkansas Boulevard interchange to a new freeway-to-freeway interchange with I-30. Once this section was opened, the only remaining requirement to become I-130 would have been to upgrade the at-grade intersection with 19th Street to a full interchange; the right-of-way for this was reserved years ago. However, with I-49 also pending completion between Texarkana and Shreveport, Louisiana (including a segment in Arkansas also being built with ARRA funds), future I-130 was instead made part of I-49 by summer 2014.

In May 2013, the final designated portion of AR 245 was removed from service and re-designated Four States Fair Parkway. AR 245 was the former designation of Arkansas's section of the loop.

Interstate 369 was designated on May 30, and signs of the highway were installed on September 23, 2013.

== Future ==
Future plans calls for a northwest portion to be constructed according to 2001 Environmental Impact Statement (EIS).

== Exit list ==
State	County	Location	mi	km	Exit	Destinations	Notes
Texas	Bowie	Texarkana	0.00	0.00	—	I-30 / US 59 north / University Avenue – Little Rock, Dallas I-369 begins	Northern end of US 59 concurrency; northern terminus of I-369; exit 220A on I-30
Texas	Bowie	Texarkana	0.2	0.32	114B	FM 559 (Richmond Road)	Northbound exit only
Texas	Bowie	Texarkana	0.4	0.64	114A	US 82 (New Boston Road)	
Texas	Bowie	Texarkana	1.2	1.9	113	Westlawn Drive – Wake Village	
Texas	Bowie	Texarkana	2.1	3.4	112	US 67 (7th Street)	
Texas	Bowie	Texarkana	3.2	5.1	111B	Frontage Road	Southbound exit and northbound entrance
Texas	Bowie	Texarkana	3.8	6.1	I-369 ends, Loop 151 begins		
Texas	Bowie	Texarkana	3.8	6.1	111A	US 59 south / SH 93 north to FM 3527 – Houston	No westbound access to FM 3527; southern end of US 59 concurrency; southern terminus of SH 93; exit number not signed westbound
Texas	Bowie	Texarkana	4.5	7.2	—	FM 3527 (Leopard Drive)	Westbound exit and eastbound entrance
Texas	Bowie	Texarkana	5.7	9.2	—	FM 558 (Buchanan Road)	
Texas–Arkansas state line	Bowie–Miller county line	Texarkana	7.3 0.00	11.7 0.00	—	S. State Line Avenue	Eastern terminus of Loop 151; western terminus of AR 151
Arkansas	Miller	Texarkana	1.4– 1.9	2.3– 3.1	1	I-49 south – Shreveport AR 151 ends	Southern end of I-49 concurrency; northern terminus of AR 151; exit 29B on I-49; exit number not signed southbound
Arkansas	Miller	Texarkana	1.4– 1.9	2.3– 3.1	29	US 71 – Texarkana	Northbound exit and southbound entrance
Arkansas	Miller	Texarkana	3.2	5.1	31	AR 196 (Genoa Road)	
Arkansas	Miller	Texarkana	4.6	7.4	32	US 82 (9th Street) to 19th Street	Northbound exit and southbound entrance; serves Magnolia and El Dorado
Arkansas	Miller	Texarkana	5.2	8.4	32	19th Street to US 82 (9th Street)	Southbound exit and northbound entrance; serves Magnolia and El Dorado
Arkansas	Miller	Texarkana	6.8	10.9	35	Four States Fair Parkway / Arkansas Boulevard	Serves Texarkana Regional Airport
Arkansas	Miller	Texarkana	8.9	14.3	37	I-30 – Hope, Little Rock, Texarkana, Dallas	Signed as exits 37A (east) and 37B (west)
Arkansas	Miller		12.2	19.6	41	Sanderson Lane	
Arkansas–Texas state line	Miller–Bowie county line		14.1	22.7	42	US 71 (US 59) – Texarkana, Ashdown, Fort Smith I-49 ends	Current northern terminus of I-49; at-grade intersection; exit number not signed
1.000 mi = 1.609 km; 1.000 km = 0.621 mi: Concurrency terminus; Incomplete access; Route transition
