= Redwater High School =

Location
- 120 Red River Road; Redwater, Bowie County, Texas 75573; United States; 33.366199°N 94.249881°W

Information
- School type: Public, high school
- Locale: Rural: Distant
- School district: Redwater ISD
- NCES School ID: 483675004109
- Principal: Shaun George
- Teaching staff: 38.72 (FTE)
- Grades: 9‍–‍12
- Enrollment: 351 (2023‍–‍2024)
- Student to teacher ratio: 9.07
- Colors: Blue and white
- Team name: Dragons
- Website: rhs.redwaterisd.org

Redwater High School is a public high school located in Redwater, Texas. It is the sole high school in the Redwater Independent School District and is classified as a 3A school by the University Interscholastic League. During 2022‍–‍2023, Redwater High School had an enrollment of 339 students and a student to teacher ratio of 8.83. The school received an overall rating of "B" from the Texas Education Agency for the 2024‍–‍2025 school year

== Athletics ==
The Redwater Dragons compete in the following sports:

- Baseball
- Basketball
- Cross Country
- Football
- Golf
- Powerlifting
- Softball
- Tennis
- Track and Field
- Volleyball
