= Victory City (disambiguation) =

Victory City may refer to:

- Ciudad de Victoria, a tourism enterprise zone in the Philippines
- Victory City, Texas, an unincorporated community in Texas
- Victory City (novel), a 2023 novel by Salman Rushdie
