= Arkansas Highway 129 =

State highway in Arkansas, United States

Highway 129

Route information
- Maintained by ArDOT
- Existed: 1928–present

Section 1
- Length: 15.02 mi (24.17 km)
- South end: LA 33 at the Louisiana state line in Huttig
- North end: US 82 in Strong

Section 2
- Length: 4.30 mi (6.92 km)
- South end: US 63 at Old Union
- North end: CR 185 at Lawson

Location
- Country: United States
- State: Arkansas
- Counties: Union

Highway system
- Arkansas Highway System; Interstate; US; State; Business; Spurs; Suffixed; Scenic; Heritage
← AR 128	→ AR 130

Highway 129 (AR 129, Ark. 129, and Hwy. 129) is a designation for two north–south state highways in Union County. A southern route of 15.02 miles (24.17 km) runs north from Louisiana Highway 33 (LA 33) at the Louisiana state line to US Route 82 (US 82) in Strong. A second route of 4.30 miles (6.92 km) begins at US 63 and runs south to Lawson.

== Route description ==
=== Louisiana to Strong ===
From the south, Highway 129 begins as a continuation of LA 33 at the state line. Heading north, Highway 129 produces a business route, Highway 129B, which serves the residential areas of Huttig. After about 9 miles (14 km), Highway 129 joins with Highway 275, running concurrently until an intersection with US 82 terminates Highway 129. AR 275 continues north to US 63.

AR 129 is an undivided, two-lane road for its entire route.

=== US 63 to Lawson ===
Highway 129 begins at US 63 at Old Union and runs southeast to Union County Road 185 at Lawson. A 2010 study of annual average daily traffic (AADT) by the Arkansas State Highway and Transportation Department (AHTD) reveals that about 500 vehicles use the daily basis around Lawson, and around 1,000 vehicles per day use the road near the northern terminus.

== History ==
Highway 129 first shows up on the 1928 Arkansas state highway map as a short route from the Louisiana state line to State Road 2 in Huttig. The route was later extended to Strong around 1930 as State Road 2 was rerouted through Crossett. The short segment to Lawson was added between 1965 and 1966 and remains along the original alignment today.

== Major intersections ==
The entire route is in Union County.

Location	mi	km	Destinations	Notes
	0.00	0.00	LA 33 – Marion	Southern terminus
	2.52	4.06	AR 129B north – Huttig	Southern end of AR 129B
	2.95	4.75	AR 129B south – Huttig	Northern end of AR 129B
	13.86	22.31	AR 275 south – Farmerville	Begin AR 275 concurrency
Strong	15.02	24.17	US 82 / AR 275 north	Northern terminus
Gap in route
Old Union	0.00	0.00	US 63	Northern terminus
Lawson	4.30	6.92	CR 185	Southern terminus
1.000 mi = 1.609 km; 1.000 km = 0.621 mi

== Huttig business route ==
Highway 129B
- Location: Huttig
- Length: 2.24 mi (3.60 km)

Highway 129 Business (AR 129B, Ark. 129B, and Hwy. 129B) is a north–south state highway business route at Huttig. The route of 2.24 miles (3.60 km) serves to connect Huttig to the state highway system.

=== Major intersections ===
The entire route is in Union County.

Location	mi	km	Destinations	Notes
	0.00	0.00	AR 129	Southern terminus
	2.24	3.60	AR 129	Northern terminus
1.000 mi = 1.609 km; 1.000 km = 0.621 mi

== See also ==
- List of state highways in Arkansas
