= U.S. Route 82 in Arkansas =

Segment of American highway

U.S. Highway 82
- US 82 highlighted in red

Route information
- Maintained by ArDOT
- Length: 190.71 mi (306.92 km)
- Existed: July 1, 1931–present

Major junctions
- West end: US 59 / US 67 / US 71 / US 82 at the Texas state line in Texarkana
- I-49 in Texarkana; US 371 in Magnolia; US 79 in Magnolia; US 63 / US 167 / AR 7 in El Dorado; US 425 in Hamburg; US 165 in Montrose; US 65 / US 278 in Lake Village
- East end: US 82 / US 278 at the Mississippi state line near Lake Village

Location
- Country: United States
- State: Arkansas
- Counties: Miller, Lafayette, Columbia, Union, Ashley, Chicot

Highway system
- United States Numbered Highway System; List; Special; Divided; Arkansas Highway System; Interstate; US; State; Business; Spurs; Suffixed; Scenic; Heritage
← AR 81	→ AR 83

U.S. Route 82 (US 82) is a major east–west arterial highway across Arkansas's lowest tier of counties. It enters Arkansas from Texas, concurrent with US 67, at a junction with US 71 on the border between Texarkana, Texas and Texarkana, Arkansas. The route leaves Arkansas on the Lake Village Bridge over the Mississippi River near Lake Village, crossing into Mississippi.

== Route description ==
US 82 runs across the southern tier of counties in Arkansas, serving three cities of regional importance: Texarkana, Magnolia, and El Dorado in the Arkansas Timberlands. The eastern half of the route runs through the Lower Arkansas Delta, serving small towns and agricultural areas.

US 82 enters the state from Texarkana, TX concurrent with US 67 as a pair of one-way streets. Running east as 7th Street (the westbound half of the couplet is Dr. Martin Luther King Jr. Blvd), the road enters Arkansas at an intersection with State Line Avenue. The junction provides US 67/ US 82 with access northward to US 59/US 71 via US 71Y (unsigned). At Hazel Street, US 67/US 82 intersects US 59/US 71, beginning a brief concurrency east to Hickory St, when US 59/US 71 turns south toward Shreveport, LA. The intersection is near the J.K. Wadley House, listed on the National Register of Historic Places. The two one-way streets combine at Hickory St and run east as 9th Street to Broad Street, where US 67 turns northeast. Continuing east, US 82 intersects Interstate 49 (I-49) with a diamond interchange, the only junction with an Interstate highway in Arkansas. In east Texarkana, US 82 intersects Highway 237 south of the Texarkana Regional Airport.

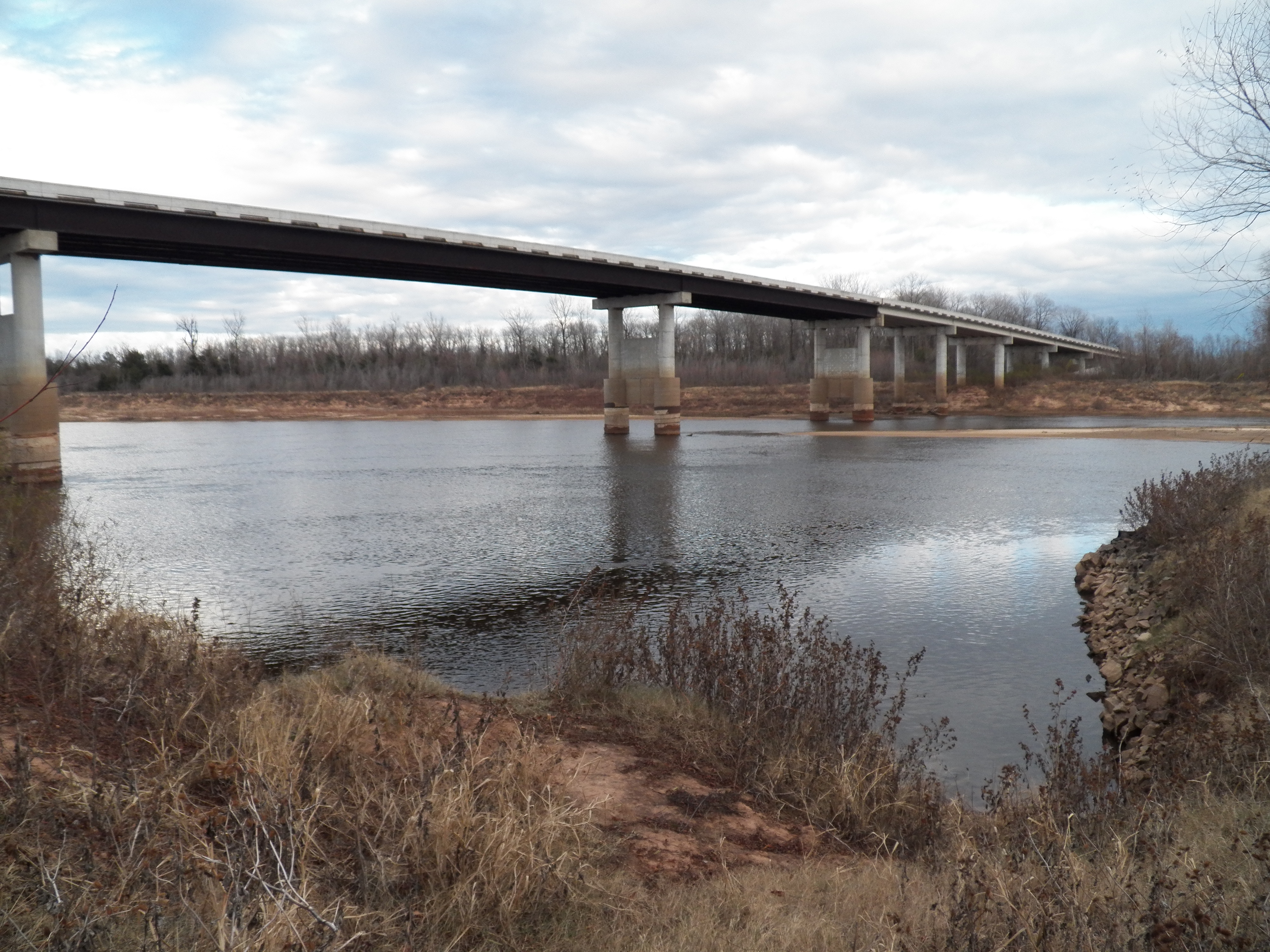
Highway 82 crosses the Red River

East of Texarkana, US 82 runs to the east side of Miller County near the Lafayette County line and Red River. The route intersects Highway 296 before turning south toward Garland, where it intersects Highway 134. US 82 turns east and crosses the Red River to enter Lafayette County. US 82 runs east to Lewisville, the county seat of Lafayette County, where it intersects Highway 29 just south of downtown Lewisville. The route continues east to Stamps, where a concurrency begins with Highway 53 to Buckner, where Highway 53 turns north. East of Buckley, the highway crosses into Columbia County, with the county line following Dorcheat Bayou.

After passing over Dorcheat Bayou, US 82 serves as the northern terminus of Highway 344 near Lake Columbia. Continuing east to Lumber, US 82 intersects Highway 98 and turns southeast toward Magnolia. Highway 98 in this area is a former alignment of US 82, which formerly ran through Waldo and McNeil. US 82 intersects US 371 near the northwest corner of Magnolia; giving access to downtown Magnolia. US 82 serves as the northern boundary for Magnolia and Southern Arkansas University (SAU), including Walker Stadium at Goodheart Field, the football stadium. US 82 serves as the northern terminus of Highway 355 (Washington Street), which serves as the main road through campus. On the eastern side of the city, US 82 intersects and overlaps US 79 for 2.20 miles (3.54 km) until a junction with US 82B (Main Street). US 82B runs west toward downtown Magnolia, US 79 continues south to Haynesville, Louisiana, and US 82 turns east as a section line road toward El Dorado.

Entering Union County, US 82 serves as the southern terminus of Highway 57 at Marysville and Highway 172 at Cairo before passing the South Arkansas Regional Airport. Shortly after entering the city limits of El Dorado, US 82 veers right onto a divided highway, with a former alignment continuing toward the central business district as a business route. Along the city's southwest side, US 82 serves as a northern terminus of Highway 15 at exit 18. In the city's southeast corner, an interchange with US 167, US 63, and Highway 7 gives access to Camden, Hampton, and Bernice, LA. US 82 reconnects with the business route and runs east to Strong, where it has a junction with Highway 275 and Highway 129. East of Strong, US 82 enters the Felsenthal National Wildlife Refuge, passing north of Lake Jack Lee to cross the Ouachita River and enter Ashley County.

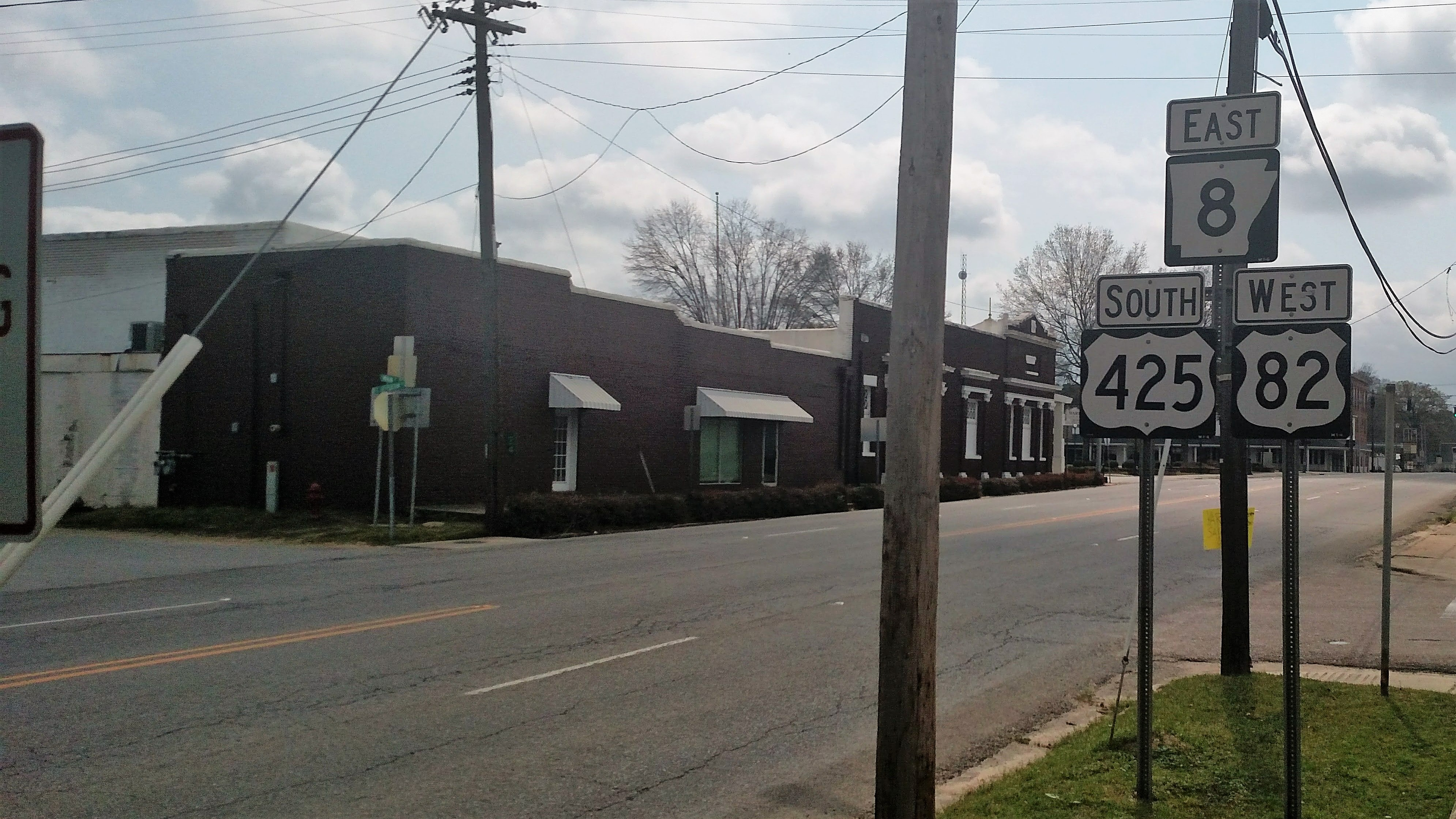
US 82 overlaps with US 425 and Highway 8 in Hamburg

Highway 82 serves as the northern terminus of Highway 82 Spur, leading to the Port of Crossett, before the route exits the NWR. Entering Crossett, the route has an overlap with Highway 169 and passes a Georgia Pacific plant. North of downtown, Highway 82 intersects Highway 133 Truck, followed by a short overlap with Highway 133. The highway exits the town heading due east, turns north and begins an overlap with Highway 52 and US 425. Shortly after turning north, Highway 52 breaks from the concurrency toward the west, with US 82/US 425 continuing north to Hamburg. Upon entering the city, US 82/US 425 begins overlaps with Highway 52, passing the First United Methodist Church and Hamburg Commercial Historic District. North of downtown, US 82 turns east onto St. Louis Street, with US 425 and Highway 8 continuing north on Main Street. The route runs northeast to Thebes, where it has a junction with Highway 160 before bypassing Montrose, where US 82B serves the downtown business district. US 82 has a grade-separated intersection with US 165 in Montrose before continuing east into Chicot County.

The route continues east to Lake Village; from there across the Mississippi River to Greenville, MS.

== History ==
The route was designated on July 1, 1931. In Arkansas, it replaced State Road 2.

US 82 was realigned around Waldo and Magnolia on February 25, 1954 on to present-day US 371. The former alignment of US 82 was redesignated at Highway 98. On May 20, 1970, this segment was bypassed by a new terrain US 82. The former routings were renumbered Highway 98 and Highway 19 (now US 371), and the Magnolia business route was created.

- El Dorado was bypassed in the 1980s; Highway 2 is now a business route.
- The segment between Crossett and Hamburg has been rerouted several times, most recently in the 1970s. Highway 2 is now parts of Highway 133 and Highway 52 north of Crossett, a short spur of Highway 189 in Hamburg, and a county road from the end of Highway 189 south to Highway 52.
- Montrose was bypassed in the 1940s by a railroad overpass; Highway 2 is now a minor business route.

In 1989, the Arkansas General Assembly passed Act 622. This act authorized governor Bill Clinton to sign a compact with Texas, Mississippi, and Alabama to four-lane US 82 across the four states. The compact also created the U.S. Highway 82 Four Lane Construction Authority to assist the effort. Mike Kinard, state senator from Magnolia, sponsored the bill. Mississippi joined the effort in 1989, appointing three citizens to the Authority. However, it appears the Authority was never created; with Texas, Alabama, and United States Congress coordination and approval never coming to pass.

== Major intersections ==
County	Location	mi	km	Exit	Destinations	Notes
Miller	Texarkana	0.00	0.00		US 67 south / US 82 west – Dallas, Paris	Continuation into Texas
Miller	Texarkana	0.00	0.00		US 71 north (State Line Avenue)	Western end of US 71 concurrency eastbound; Texas state line
Miller	Texarkana	0.10	0.16		US 71 north (Hazel Street)	Western end of US 71 concurrency westbound
Miller	Texarkana	0.46	0.74		US 71 south (Hickory Street)	East end of US 71 concurrency
Miller	Texarkana	0.95	1.53		US 67 north (Broad Street) – Airport	Eastern end of US 67 concurrency
Miller	Texarkana	2.32	3.73		I-49 south – Shreveport, LA To I-30 / I-49 north	Exit 32 on I-30
Miller	Texarkana	3.85	6.20		AR 237 (Rondo Road) to AR 196 – Rondo	
Miller		17.72	28.52		AR 296 west	Eastern terminus of AR 296
Miller	Garland	21.22	34.15		AR 134 west – Garland	Eastern terminus of AR 134
Red River		22.24– 22.56	35.79– 36.31	Miller–Lafayette county line		
Lafayette	Lewisville	29.89	48.10		AR 29 (Maple Street) – Hope, Bradley	
Lafayette	Stamps	34.23	55.09		AR 53 south	Western end of AR 53 concurrency
Lafayette	Buckner	38.34	61.70		AR 53 north (Main Street) – Bodcaw	Eastern end of AR 53 concurrency
Dorcheat Bayou		39.51– 39.59	63.59– 63.71	Lafayette–Columbia county line		
Columbia		41.46	66.72		AR 344 east – Lake Columbia	Western terminus of AR 344
Columbia		43.71	70.34		AR 98 east – Waldo	Western terminus of AR 98
Columbia	Magnolia	50.48	81.24		US 371 – Waldo, Magnolia	
Columbia	Magnolia	51.32	82.59		AR 355 south – Magnolia, Southern Arkansas University	Northern terminus of AR 355; access to Magnolia Regional Medical Center
Columbia	Magnolia	52.68	84.78		US 79 north – Camden, Logoly State Park	Western end of US 79 concurrency
Columbia	Magnolia	54.88	88.32		US 79 south / US 82B west – Minden, LA, Shreveport, LA, Magnolia Business District	Eastern end of US 79 concurrency; eastern terminus of US 82B
Columbia		64.58	103.93		AR 98 – Village, Atlanta	
Union	Marysville	70.56	113.56		AR 57 north – Mount Holly	Southern terminus of AR 57
Union	Cairo	75.86	122.08		AR 172 east – Smackover	Eastern terminus of AR 172
Union		82.99– 83.79	133.56– 134.85		AR 335	
Union	El Dorado	85.59	137.74	17	US 82B east (Hillsboro Street) – El Dorado Business District	Western terminus of US 82B
Union	El Dorado	86.87	139.80	18	AR 15 south (Haynesville Highway) – Parker's Chapel, El Dorado	Northern terminus of AR 15
Union	El Dorado	90.33	145.37	22	US 63 south (Haynesville Hwy) / US 167 / AR 7 – Junction City, El Dorado	
Union	El Dorado	91.35	147.01		US 82B west – El Dorado Business District	Eastern terminus of US 82B
Union	Strong	108.09	173.95		AR 129 south (Concord Street) / AR 275 – Felsenthal Lock & Dam	Northern terminus of AR 129
Ashley	Felsenthal NWR	123.80	199.24		US 82S south – Port of Crossett	Northern terminus of US 82B
Ashley	Crossett	130.95– 131.14	210.74– 211.05		AR 169 (Hancock Road / Texas Street) – Industrial Park	
Ashley	Crossett	131.82	212.14		AR 133T south (Dr. MLK Jr. Drive)	Northern terminus of AR 133T
Ashley	Crossett	132.15– 132.67	212.67– 213.51		AR 133 (Main Street)	
Ashley		140.47	226.06		US 425 south / AR 52 east – Bastrop, LA	Western end of US 425/AR 52 concurrency
Ashley		143.11	230.31		AR 52 west – North Crossett	Eastern end of AR 52 concurrency
Ashley	Hamburg	146.80	236.25		AR 189 west (Jackson Street) – Ashley County Fairgrounds	Western end of AR 189 concurrency
Ashley	Hamburg	147.07	236.69		AR 8 east (Parker Street) – Parkdale	Western end of AR 8 concurrency
Ashley	Hamburg	147.30	237.06		AR 189 west (Washington Street)	Eastern end of AR 189 concurrency
Ashley	Hamburg	147.42	237.25		US 425 north / AR 8 west (Main Street) – Monticello	Eastern end of US 425/AR 8 concurrency
Ashley	Thebes	161.02	259.14		AR 160 east – Portland	Western terminus of AR 160
Ashley	Montrose	165.68	266.64		US 82B east – Montrose Business District	Western terminus of US 82B
Ashley	Montrose	166.82	268.47		US 165 – Wilmot, Portland, McGehee	
Ashley	Montrose	166.9	268.6		US 82B west – Montrose Business District	Eastern terminus of US 82B (Note: The milepost of this intersection is not specified by AHTD beyond 0.1 miles (0.16 km).)
Chicot		171.9	276.6		AR 293 north	Southern terminus of AR 293 (Note: The milepost of this intersection is not specified by AHTD beyond 0.1 miles (0.16 km).)
Chicot	Lake Village	178.86	287.85		US 65 north / US 278 east / AR 144 west (St. Mary Street) – Pine Bluff, Lake Village Business District	Western end of US 65/US 278 concurrency; western terminus of AR 144
Chicot	Lake Village	181.28	291.74		AR 159 (Lakeshore Drive)	
Chicot	Fairview	183.52	295.35		US 65 south – Eudora, Lake Providence	Eastern end of US 65 concurrency
Chicot	Shives	188.38	303.17		AR 142 east	Western terminus of AR 142
Mississippi River		188.41– 190.71	303.22– 306.92	Greenville Bridge		
Mississippi River		188.41– 190.71	303.22– 306.92		US 82 east / US 278 east – Greenville	Continuation into Mississippi
1.000 mi = 1.609 km; 1.000 km = 0.621 mi: Concurrency terminus

== See also ==
- Red River Bridge (Arkansas) – Former bridge carrying US 82

== Notes ==
U.S. Route 82
Previous state: Texas	Arkansas	Next state: Mississippi
