= Victory City, Texas =

- Unincorporated community
- Location within Texas Location within the United States
- Coordinates: 33°27′54″N 94°14′13″W
- Country: United States
- State: Texas
- County: Bowie
- Elevation: 354 ft (108 m)
- Time zone: UTC-6 (Central (CST))
  - Summer (DST): UTC-5 (CDT)
- Area codes: 903 & 430
- GNIS feature ID: 1370639

Victory City is an unincorporated community in Bowie County, in the U.S. state of Texas. According to the Handbook of Texas, the community had a population of 250 in 2000. It is located within the Texarkana metropolitan area.

== History ==
Victory City was founded 1940s when the Lone Star Army Ammunition Plant was built; many townspeople worked at the plant. Its name is a reference to World War II. Its population was recorded as 250 in 2000 and has a cemetery in Hooks.

== Geography ==
Victory City is located just north of Interstate 30 on the Texas and Pacific Railway and U.S. Highway 82, 11 mi (18 km) west of Texarkana and 1.4 mi (2.3 km) west of Leary in east-central Bowie County.

== Education ==
Victory City is served by the Leary Independent School District.
