= Arkansas Highway 275 =

State highway in Arkansas, United States

Highway 275

Route information
- Maintained by ArDOT
- Length: 18.92 mi (30.45 km)

Major junctions
- South end: LA 549 at the Louisiana state line near Strong
- AR 129 near Strong; US 82 in Strong
- North end: US 63 near Moro Bay

Location
- Country: United States
- State: Arkansas

Highway system
- Arkansas Highway System; Interstate; US; State; Business; Spurs; Suffixed; Scenic; Heritage
← AR 274	→ AR 276

Arkansas Highway 275 (AR 275) is a state highway in Arkansas that serves Union County. It spans 18.92 miles (30.45 km).

== Route description ==
From the south, AR 275 begins as a continuation of LA 549 at the state line. Heading north, AR 275 meets AR 129, and the two are signed together towards Strong. AR 129/275 then meet U.S. Route 82 (US 82) in Strong, with AR 129 ending at the intersection.

AR 275 continues north towards Moro Bay, passing through relatively rural areas. AR 275 ends at an intersection with US 63.

AR 275 is an undivided, two-lane road for its entire route.

== Major intersections ==
The entire route is in Union County.

Location	mi	km	Destinations	Notes
	0.0	0.0	LA 549 – Farmerville	Southern terminus; Louisiana state line
	6.0	9.7	AR 129 south – Huttig	Southern end of AR 129 concurrency
Strong	7.2	11.6	US 82 – El Dorado, Crossett	Northern terminus of AR 129
Moro Bay	19.0	30.6	US 63 – Hermitage	Northern terminus
1.000 mi = 1.609 km; 1.000 km = 0.621 mi: Concurrency terminus
