= Interstate 30 =

Interstate Highway in Texas and Arkansas

Interstate 30
- I-30 highlighted in red

Route information
- Length: 366.76 mi (590.24 km)
- Existed: August 14, 1957–present
- NHS: Entire route

Major junctions
- West end: I-20 near Aledo, TX
- I-820 in Fort Worth, TX; I-35W / US 287 / US 377 in Fort Worth, TX; I-35E / US 77 in Dallas, TX; I-45 / I-345 in Dallas, TX; I-635 in Mesquite, TX; I-369 / US 59 in Texarkana, TX; I-49 in Texarkana, AR; I-430 / US 70 in Little Rock, AR; I-440 / I-530 / US 65 / US 167 in Little Rock, AR; I-630 in Little Rock, AR
- East end: I-40 / US 65 / US 67 / US 167 / AR 107 in North Little Rock, AR

Location
- Country: United States
- States: Texas, Arkansas
- Counties: TX: Parker, Tarrant, Dallas, Rockwall, Hunt, Hopkins, Franklin, Titus, Morris, Bowie; AR: Miller, Hempstead, Nevada, Clark, Hot Spring, Saline, Pulaski

Highway system
- Interstate Highway System; Main; Auxiliary; Suffixed; Business; Future
- Highways in Texas; Interstate; US; State; Former; Toll; Loops; Spurs; FM/RM; Park; Rec
- Arkansas Highway System; Interstate; US; State; Business; Spurs; Suffixed; Scenic; Heritage
← SH 29	TX	→ SH 30
← AR 29	AR	→ AR 30

Interstate 30 (I-30 (Note: In Texas, some sources use "IH 30", as "IH" is an abbreviation used by the Texas Department of Transportation for Interstate Highways.)) is a major Interstate Highway in the southern states of Texas and Arkansas in the United States. I-30 travels 366.76 miles (590.24 km) from I-20 west of Fort Worth, Texas, northeast via Dallas, and Texarkana, Texas, to I-40 in North Little Rock, Arkansas. The highway parallels U.S. Route 67 (US 67) except for the portion west of Downtown Dallas (which was once part of I-20). Between the termini, I-30 has interchanges with I-35W, I-35E, and I-45. I-30 is known as the Tom Landry Freeway between I-35W and I-35E, within the core of the Dallas–Fort Worth metroplex.

== Route description ==
Lengths
	mi	km
TX	223.74	360.07
AR	143.02	230.17
Total	366.76	590.24

The largest metropolitan areas that I-30 travels through include the Dallas–Fort Worth metroplex, the Texarkana metropolitan area, and the Little Rock metropolitan area.

=== Texas ===
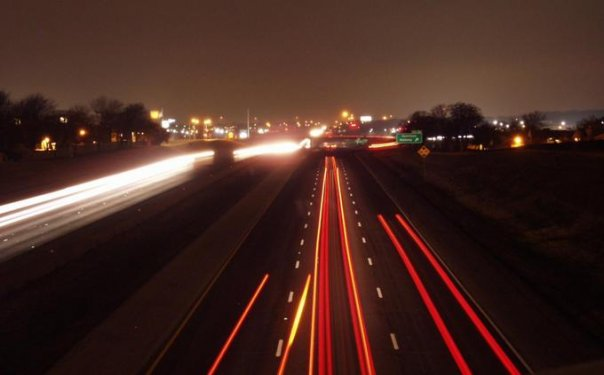
Tom Landry Freeway at Eastchase in Fort Worth, Texas

The western end and zero mile point of I-30 in Texas is at its interchange with I-20 in Parker County near Aledo. It then travels near Downtown Fort Worth on a new routing further south than the now removed Lancaster Elevated section of the freeway. The section of I-30 between Dallas and Fort Worth is designated the Tom Landry Highway in honor of the longtime Dallas Cowboys coach. This section was previously known as the Dallas–Fort Worth Turnpike, which preceded the Interstate System. The section from Downtown Dallas to Arlington was widened to over 16 lanes in some sections by 2010.

In Dallas, I-30 is known as East R.L. Thornton Freeway between Downtown Dallas and the eastern suburb of Mesquite. I-30 picks up the name from I-35E south at the Mixmaster interchange. The Mixmaster is scheduled to be reconstructed as part of the Horseshoe project, derived from the larger Pegasus Project. The section from Downtown Dallas to State Highway Loop 12 (Loop 12, Buckner Boulevard) is eight lanes plus an HOV lane. This section will be reconstructed under the East Corridor project to 12 lanes by 2025–2030. From Rockwall to a point past Sulphur Springs, I-30 runs concurrently with US 67. Through Greenville, I-30 is known as Martin Luther King Jr. Freeway. I-30 continues northeasterly through East Texas until a few miles from the Oklahoma state line, when the route turns east toward Arkansas.

=== Arkansas ===
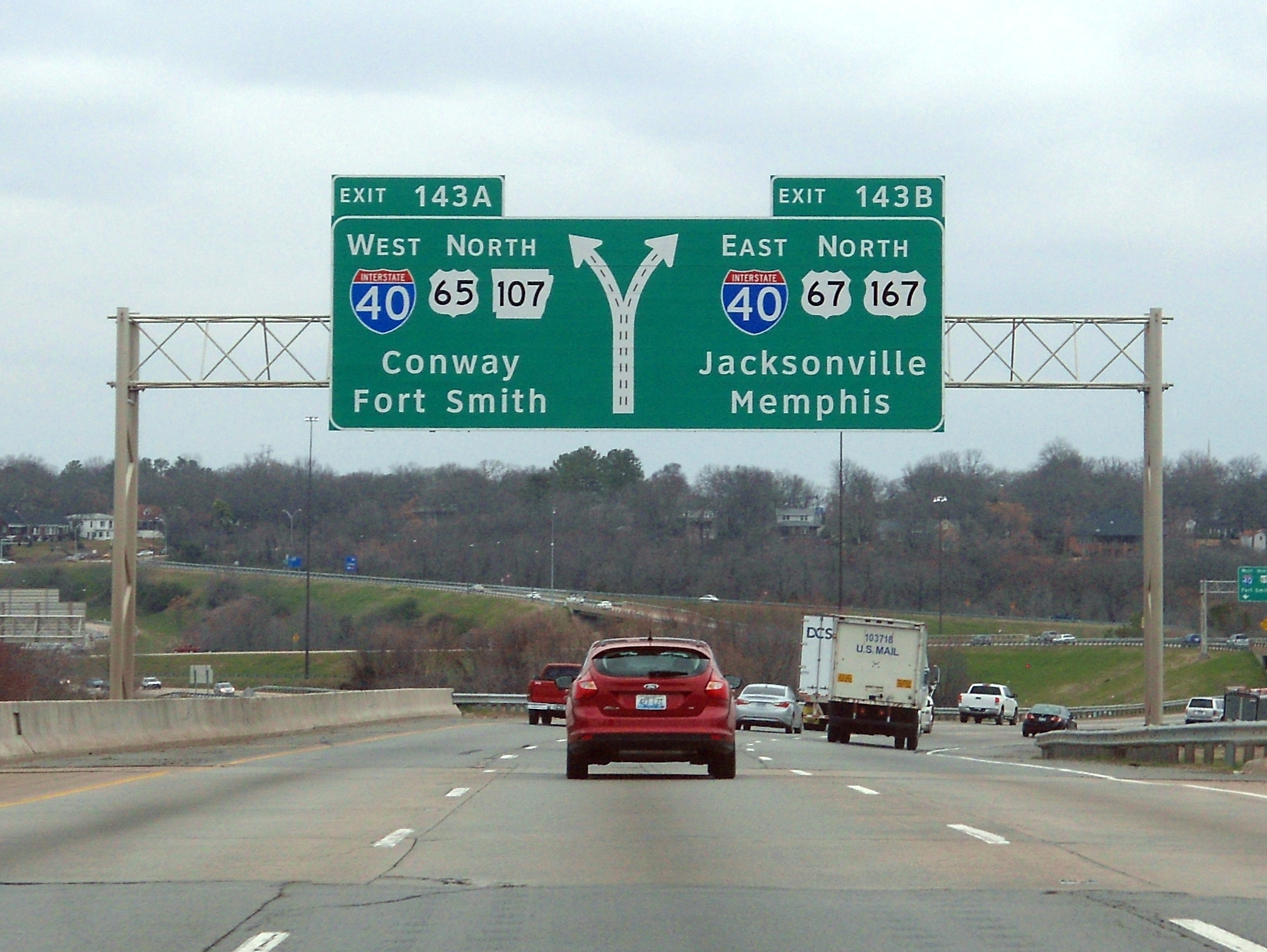
I-30's eastern terminus at I-40 in North Little Rock, Arkansas

I-30 enters southwestern Arkansas at Texarkana. I-30 intersects I-49, after which it travels northeast. I-30 then passes through Hope, Prescott, Gurdon, Arkadelphia, and Malvern. At Malvern, drivers can use US 70 or US 270 to travel into historic Hot Springs or beyond into Ouachita National Forest. There, US 70 and US 67 join I-30 and stay with the interstate into the Little Rock city limits. Northeast of Malvern, I-30 passes through Benton before reaching the Little Rock city limits. From Benton to its end at I-40, I-30 is a six-lane highway with up to 85,000 vehicles per day. As I-30 enters Little Rock, I-430 leaves its parent route to create a western bypass of the city. Just south of downtown, I-30 meets the western terminus of I-440 and the northern terminus of another auxiliary route in I-530. I-530 travels 46 miles (74 km) south to Pine Bluff. At this three-way junction of Interstates, I-30 turns due north for the final few miles of its route. Here, I-30 passes through the capitol district of Little Rock. I-30 also creates one final auxiliary route in I-630, or the Wilbur D. Mills Freeway, which splits Downtown Little Rock in an east–west direction before coming to its other end at I-430 just west of downtown. After passing I-630, I-30 crosses the Arkansas River into North Little Rock and comes to its eastern terminus, despite facing north, at I-40. At its end, I-30 is joined by US 65, US 67, and US 167. US 65 joins I-40 westbound, while US 67 and US 167 join I-40 eastbound from I-30's eastern terminus.

== History ==
Dallas–Fort Worth Turnpike signage

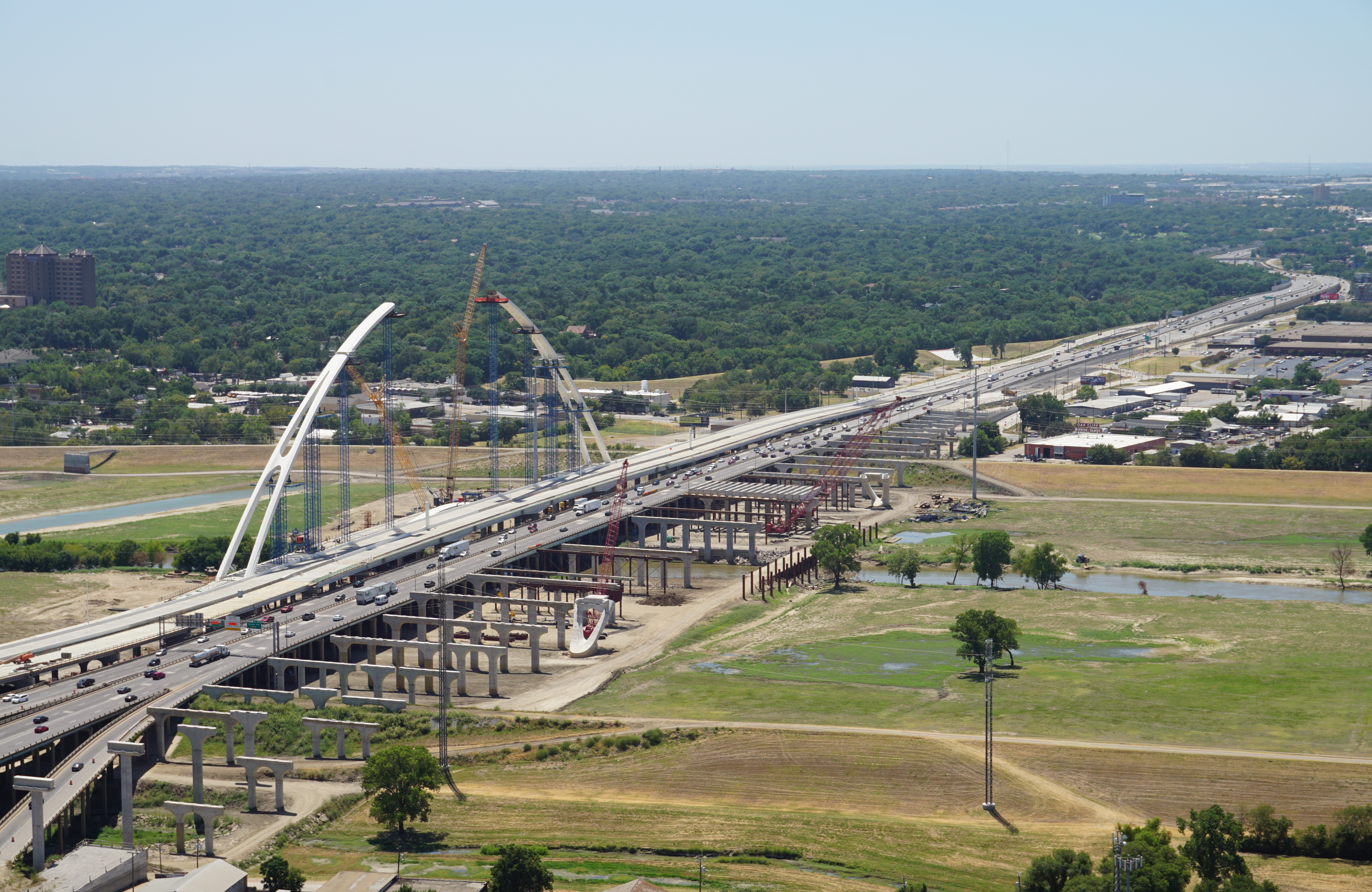
I-30 as viewed from Reunion Tower in Dallas as of August 2015 during the construction of the Margaret McDermott Bridge

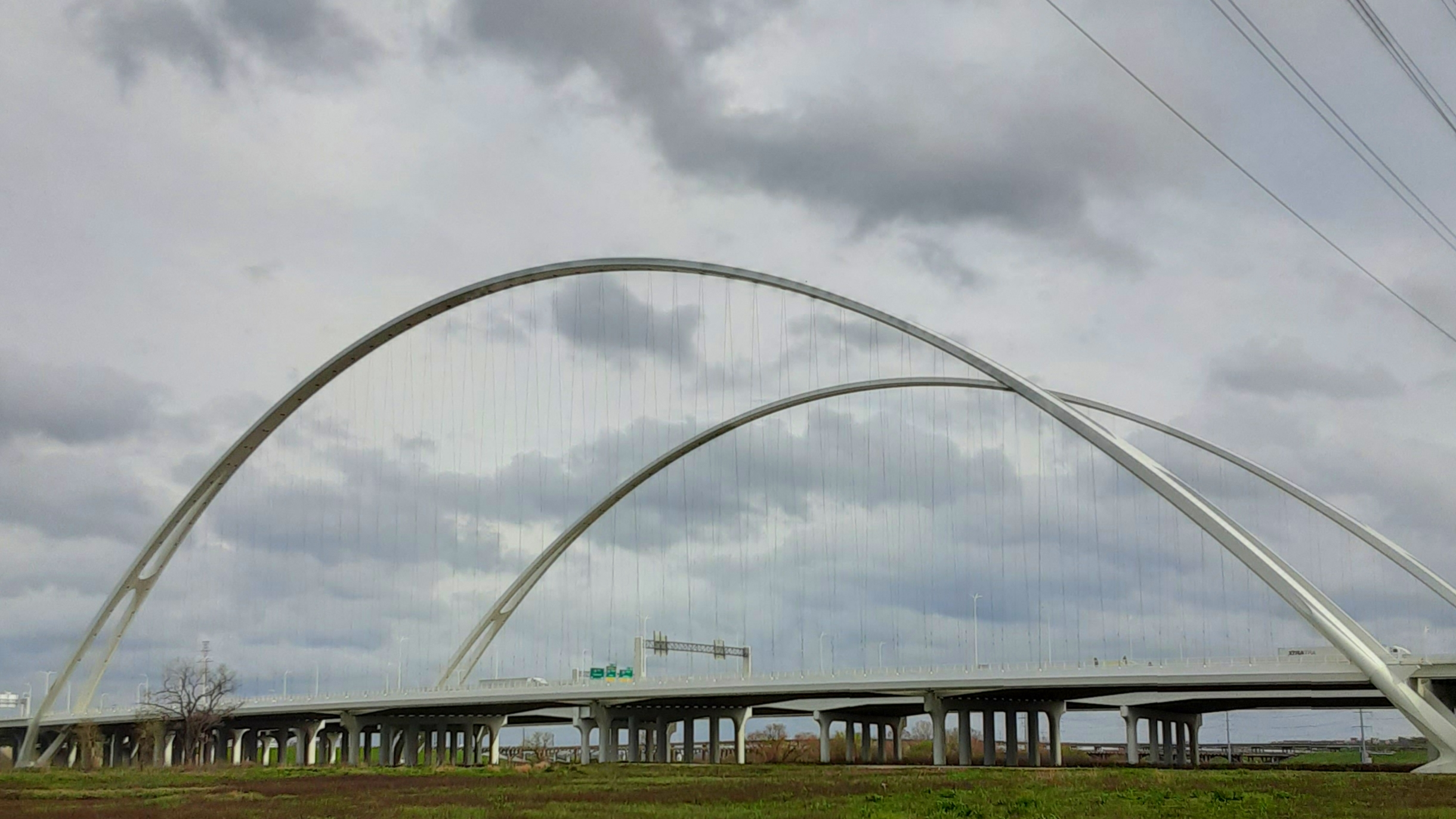
The Margaret McDermott Bridge on I-30 crosses the Trinity River in west Dallas. This bridge was completed in 2016 as part of the Horseshoe Project and the Trinity River Project.

The very first fully controlled-access part of what is now I-30 was the Dallas–Fort Worth Turnpike, a 30-mile (48 km) controlled-access tollway in the Dallas–Fort Worth area. Completed by 1957, it operated as a toll road between 1957 and 1977, afterward becoming a nondescript part of I-20 and then I-30. The road, three lanes in each direction but later widened, is the only direct connection between Downtown Fort Worth and Downtown Dallas. In October 2001, the former turnpike was named the Tom Landry Highway, after the late Dallas Cowboys coach.

The proposed expressway was studied as early as 1944 but was turned down by the state engineer due to the expense. However, in 1953, the state legislature created the Texas Turnpike Authority, which, in 1955, raised $58.5 million (equivalent to $533.08 million in 2024) to build the project. Construction started later that year. On August 27, 1957, the highway was open to traffic, but the official opening came a week later on September 5. The turnpike's presence stimulated growth in Arlington and Grand Prairie and facilitated construction of Six Flags Over Texas. At the end of 1977, the bonds were paid off, and the freeway was handed over to the state Department of Transportation, toll collection ceased, and the tollbooths were removed in the first week of 1978.

The existing US 67 route was already in heavy use in the early 1950s, at which point it was twinned from just east of Dallas to Rockwall and also a rural section near Greenville and a few miles in Hopkins County. There were still a few at-grade crossings on these two sections into the 1980s. The twinned US 67 routes were upgraded to Interstate Highway standards beginning in 1961, forming the R.L. Thornton Freeway. By the mid-1960s, much of I-30 was under construction outside the metroplex as well. The majority of the route was completed by 1965, but a 40-mile (64 km) stretch through rural areas built on a new alignment well away from US 67 between Mount Pleasant and New Boston remained unfinished. This remaining segment was finally built and opened to traffic in 1971, completing I-30.

Originally, the west end of I-30 was at the current intersection of I-30 and US 80 near the border of Mesquite and Dallas. I-20 went into Downtown Dallas and across the former turnpike through Downtown Fort Worth and to points west. Later, I-20 took its current southerly route around Dallas and Fort Worth, and I-30 assumed the former I-20 route from US 80 to Western Fort Worth, and later to the current interchange with I-20 near Aledo. I-30 was proposed to be extended along the US 67 freeway from Little Rock. However, this conflicted with the Missouri Department of Transportation's plan to extend I-57, which is also planned to use US 67. In April 2016, a provision designating US 67 from North Little Rock to Walnut Ridge, as "Future I-57" was added to the federal fiscal year 2017 Transportation, Housing and Urban Development funding bill. The provision would also give Arkansas the ability to request any segment of the road built to Interstate Highway standards be officially added to the Interstate Highway System as I-57.

If I-30 had been extended, there were plans to upgrade AR 226 to Interstate standards and designate it as I-730. This would eventually become part of US 78 in 2023.

I-130 was a proposed auxiliary route of I-30 that was planned to be concurrent with I-49. Once the eastern segment of the Texarkana Loop had been upgraded to Interstate standards, I-130 was to have been signed; however, it is now part of I-49.

== Future ==
The Texas Department of Transportation is currently upgrading a 16-mile-long (26 km) section of I-30 between exit 62 in Garland to exit 77 at the Rockwall-Hunt county line. The work will widen the interstate from six to eight lanes, rebuild bridges, including the bridge over Lake Ray Hubbard, and reconstruct interchanges. Full completion of the project is expected by the end of 2027.

== Exit list ==
State	County	Location	mi	km	Exit	Destinations	Notes
Texas	Parker		0.0	0.0		I-20 west – Weatherford, Abilene	Western terminus; exit 421 on I-20
Texas	Parker		1.7	2.7	1A	Walsh Ranch Parkway	Exit opened in May 2016
Texas	Tarrant	Fort Worth	2.3	3.7	1B	Linkcrest Drive	
Texas	Tarrant	Fort Worth	3.3	5.3	2	Spur 580 east	Western terminus of Spur 580; former US 80
Texas	Tarrant	Fort Worth	4.3	6.9	3	RM 2871 / Chapel Creek Boulevard	
Texas	Tarrant	Fort Worth	5.2	8.4	5A	Alemeda Street	Eastbound exit and westbound entrance
Texas	Tarrant	Fort Worth	5.6	9.0	5	I-820	Signed as exits 5B (north) and 5C (south) eastbound, exits 5A (north) and 5B (south) westbound; exits 3A-B on I-820
Texas	Tarrant	Fort Worth–White Settlement line	6.6	10.6	6	Las Vegas Trail	
Texas	Tarrant	Fort Worth–White Settlement line	7.5	12.1	7A	Cherry Lane	
Texas	Tarrant	Fort Worth	7.8	12.6	7B	SH 183 (Alta Mere Drive) / Spur 341 (Lockheed Boulevard)	
Texas	Tarrant	Fort Worth	8.8	14.2	8A	Green Oaks Road	No direct eastbound exit (signed at exit 7B)
Texas	Tarrant	Fort Worth	9.1	14.6	8B	Ridgmar Boulevard, Ridglea Avenue	
Texas	Tarrant	Fort Worth	9.7	15.6	9A	Bryant Irvin Road	
Texas	Tarrant	Fort Worth	10.1	16.3	9B	US 377 south (Camp Bowie Boulevard) / Horne Street	Western end of US 377 concurrency
Texas	Tarrant	Fort Worth	11.1	17.9	10	Hulen Street	
Texas	Tarrant	Fort Worth	12.2	19.6	11	Montgomery Street – Cultural District	
Texas	Tarrant	Fort Worth	12.4	20.0	12A	University Drive – City Parks, TCU, Ft Worth Zoo	
Texas	Tarrant	Fort Worth	13.1	21.1	12B	Rosedale Street	Eastbound exit and westbound entrance; access to Medical City Fort Worth
Texas	Tarrant	Fort Worth	13.3	21.4	12C	Forest Park Boulevard	No direct westbound exit (signed at exit 13A)
Texas	Tarrant	Fort Worth	13.4	21.6	12B	Chisholm Trail Parkway south	Westbound exit and eastbound entrance
Texas	Tarrant	Fort Worth	13.6	21.9	13A	Summit Avenue, 8th Avenue	Signed as exit 13 eastbound; access to Harris Methodist Hospital, Cook Children's Medical Center, Baylor All Saints Medical Center, and Plaza Medical Center of Fort Worth
Texas	Tarrant	Fort Worth	14.5	23.3	13B	SH 199 (Henderson Street)	Eastbound access via exit 13
Texas	Tarrant	Fort Worth	15.0	24.1	15A	Lancaster Avenue, Cherry Street – Convention Center, Downtown	Eastbound access via exit 13; access to Fort Worth Central Station
Texas	Tarrant	Fort Worth	15.2	24.5	15A	I-35W / US 287 north / US 377 north – Denton, Waco	Eastern end of US 377 concurrency; signed as exits 15B (south) and 15C (north) westbound; exit 51 on I-35W
Texas	Tarrant	Fort Worth	15.5	24.9	15B	US 287 south / SH 180 east (East Lancaster Avenue)	Eastbound exit and westbound entrance
Texas	Tarrant	Fort Worth	16.6	26.7	16	Riverside Drive	Westbound exit and eastbound entrance; signed as exits 16A (south) and 16B (north)
Texas	Tarrant	Fort Worth	17.2	27.7	16 (EB) 16C (WB)	Beach Street	Signed as exit 16 eastbound, 16C westbound
Texas	Tarrant	Fort Worth	19.0	30.6	18	Oakland Boulevard, Bridge Street	
Texas	Tarrant	Fort Worth	19.4	31.2	19	Brentwood Stair Road	Eastbound exit and entrance
Texas	Tarrant	Fort Worth	21.3	34.3	21A (EB) 21B-C	I-820	Signed as exits 21A eastbound, 21B (north) and 21C (south) westbound; exits 28A-B on I-820
Texas	Tarrant	Fort Worth	21.5	34.6	21B (EB) 21A (WB)	Bridgewood Drive	
Texas	Tarrant	Fort Worth	23.5	37.8	23	Cooks Lane	
Texas	Tarrant	Fort Worth	24.4	39.3	24	Eastchase Parkway	
Texas	Tarrant	Arlington	26.6	42.8	26	Fielder Road	
Texas	Tarrant	Arlington	27.4	44.1	27A (EB) 27 (WB)	Lamar Boulevard, Cooper Street	Signed as exit 27 eastbound, 27 westbound; access to Arlington Memorial Hospital
Texas	Tarrant	Arlington	27.8	44.7	27B (EB) 28 (WB)	FM 157 (Collins Street) / Center Street	Signed as exits 28A (Center Street) and 28B (FM 157) westbound
Texas	Tarrant	Arlington	28.8	46.3	28	Nolan Ryan Expressway, Baird Farm Road, AT&T Way	No westbound exit
Texas	Tarrant	Arlington			♦	AT&T Way, Baird Farm Road	HOV access only; westbound exit and eastbound entrance
Texas	Tarrant	Arlington			29	Ballpark Way, AT&T Way, Baird Farm Road	
Texas	Tarrant	Arlington	30.8	49.6	30A	Six Flags Drive	
Texas	Tarrant	Arlington			30	SH 360 – DFW Airport	Stack interchange; signed as exits 30B (south) and 30C (north)
Texas	Tarrant–Dallas county line	Grand Prairie	32.3	52.0	32	Pres. George Bush Turnpike / SH 161	Signed as exits 32A (north) and 32B (south)
Texas	Dallas	Grand Prairie	34.4	55.4	34	Belt Line Road	
Texas	Dallas	Grand Prairie	35.8	57.6	36	MacArthur Boulevard	
Texas	Dallas	Dallas	39.5	63.6	38	Loop 12	
Texas	Dallas	Dallas	40.1	64.5	39	Cockrell Hill Road	
Texas	Dallas	Dallas	41.3	66.5	41	Westmoreland Road	
Texas	Dallas	Dallas	41.9	67.4	42	Hampton Road	Signed as exits 42A (south) and 42 (north) eastbound
Texas	Dallas	Dallas	43.8	70.5	44	Sylvan Avenue	No eastbound exit
Texas	Dallas	Dallas	44.1	71.0	44	Beckley Avenue, Riverfront Boulevard	No westbound exit; access to Methodist Medical Center of Dallas
Texas	Dallas	Dallas			Margaret McDermott Bridge over the Trinity River		
Texas	Dallas	Dallas	45.2	72.7	45 (EB) 46A (WB)	I-35E (US 67 south / US 77) – Denton, Waco, Convention Center	Western end of US 67 concurrency; Horseshoe Interchange; signed as exits 45A (north) and 45B (south) eastbound; exits 427A-428B on I-35
Texas	Dallas	Dallas	46.1	74.2	45C	Lamar Street	Closed; now part of exit 45B; was eastbound exit and westbound entrance
Texas	Dallas	Dallas	46.8	75.3	46A	Griffin Street, Cadiz Street	Closed; now part of exit 45B; was eastbound exit and westbound entrance
Texas	Dallas	Dallas	47.1	75.8	46B	Ervay Street	Westbound exit and eastbound entrance
Texas	Dallas	Dallas	47.4	76.3	47A	Cesar Chavez Boulevard	No direct eastbound exit
Texas	Dallas	Dallas	47.6	76.6	46 (EB) 47B (WB)	I-45 south / US 75 north – Houston, McKinney	Access to US 75 via I-345; northern terminus and exit 284A on I-45
Texas	Dallas	Dallas	48.1	77.4	47C	First Avenue, 2nd Avenue – Fair Park	Signed as exit 47 eastbound; signed for 1st Avenue westbound, 2nd Avenue eastbound
Texas	Dallas	Dallas	48.6	78.2	48A	Haskell Avenue, Peak Street, Carroll Avenue	Access to Baylor University Medical Center at Dallas; Haskell Avenue and Peak Street not signed westbound
Texas	Dallas	Dallas	49.2	79.2	48B	SH 78 (East Grand Avenue) / Barry Avenue, Munger Boulevard – Fair Park	
Texas	Dallas	Dallas	49.8	80.1	49A	SH 78 (East Grand Avenue) / Winslow Avenue – Fair Park	
Texas	Dallas	Dallas	50.2	80.8	49B	Dolphin Road	
Texas	Dallas	Dallas	51.0	82.1	50A	Lawnview Avenue	Eastbound exit only
Texas	Dallas	Dallas	51.2	82.4	50B	Ferguson Road	Signed as exit 50 westbound
Texas	Dallas	Dallas	52.5	84.5	52A	Jim Miller Road	
Texas	Dallas	Dallas	52.7	84.8	52B	St. Francis Avenue	
Texas	Dallas	Dallas	53.3	85.8	53A	Loop 12 (Buckner Boulevard)	
Texas	Dallas	Dallas–Mesquite line	53.7– 54.4	86.4– 87.5	53B	US 80 east – Terrell	No westbound exit; western terminus of US 80
Texas	Dallas	Dallas–Mesquite line	53.7– 54.4	86.4– 87.5	54	Big Town Boulevard	Additional ramp from US 80
Texas	Dallas	Mesquite	55.2	88.8	55	Motley Drive	
Texas	Dallas	Mesquite	56.3	90.6	56A (EB) 57 (WB)	Gus Thomasson Road, Galloway Avenue	
Texas	Dallas	Mesquite	56.9	91.6	56	I-635	Signed as exits 56B (north) and 56C (south); I-635 exits 8A-B
Texas	Dallas	Mesquite	58.1	93.5	58	Northwest Drive	
Texas	Dallas	Garland	59.2	95.3	59	Belt Line Road, Broadway Boulevard	
Texas	Dallas	Garland	60.1	96.7	60A	Rosehill Road	
Texas	Dallas	Garland	60.9	98.0	60B	Bobtown Road	Westbound access via exit 61A
Texas	Dallas	Garland	61.4	98.8	61A	Zion Road	
Texas	Dallas	Garland	61.8	99.5	61B	Pres. George Bush Turnpike	
Texas	Dallas	Garland	62.4	100.4	62	Bass Pro Drive	
Texas	Dallas	Dallas	64.4	103.6	64	Dalrock Road	
Texas	Rockwall	Rockwall	67.2	108.1	67A	Village Drive, Horizon Road	Westbound access via exit 67
Texas	Rockwall	Rockwall	67.6	108.8	67B	FM 740 (Ridge Road)	Signed as exit 67 westbound
Texas	Rockwall	Rockwall	68.0	109.4	67C	Frontage Road	Eastbound exit and westbound entrance
Texas	Rockwall	Rockwall	69.0	111.0	68	SH 205 – Rockwall, Terrell	
Texas	Rockwall	Rockwall	70.2	113.0	69	John King Boulevard	
Texas	Rockwall	Rockwall	70.6	113.6	70	FM 3549 (Stodghill Road) / Corporate Crossing	
Texas	Rockwall	Fate	72.7	117.0	73	FM 551 – Fate	
Texas	Rockwall	Royse City	75.1– 75.8	120.9– 122.0	74 (EB) 75 (WB)	Frontage Road	No entrance ramps
Texas	Rockwall	Royse City	76.8	123.6	76	Erby Campbell Boulevard	
Texas	Rockwall	Royse City	77.4	124.6	77A	FM 548 – Royse City	
Texas	Rockwall	Royse City	78.0	125.5	77B	FM 35 (Epps Road)	
Texas	Hunt	Royse City	79.8	128.4	79	FM 1565 south / FM 2642	FM 1565 not signed westbound
Texas	Hunt		81.4	131.0	81	Frontage Road	Westbound exit and eastbound entrance (currently closed due to construction)
Texas	Hunt	Caddo Mills	83.5	134.4	83	FM 1565	
Texas	Hunt		85.6	137.8	85	FM 36 – Caddo Mills	
Texas	Hunt		87.9	141.5	87	FM 1903 – Caddo Mills	
Texas	Hunt		90.2	145.2	89	FM 1570 – Airport	
Texas	Hunt	Greenville	92.1	148.2	92	Monty Stratton Parkway, Sayle Street	Sayle Street not signed eastbound
Texas	Hunt	Greenville	92.9	149.5	93	SH 34 (Wesley Street)	
Texas	Hunt	Greenville	94.5	152.1	94	US 69 / US 380 (Joe Ramsey Boulevard) / Bus. US 69 (Moulton Street)	Access to Hunt Regional Medical Center
Texas	Hunt	Greenville	96.1	154.7	95	Division Street	
Texas	Hunt	Greenville	97.1	156.3	96	Spur 302	
Texas	Hunt	Greenville	97.6	157.1	97A	Frontage Road	Westbound exit only
Texas	Hunt	Greenville	98.0	157.7	97	Lamar Street	
Texas	Hunt		102.3	164.6	101	SH 24 / FM 1737 – Commerce, Paris	
Texas	Hunt	Campbell	104.8	168.7	104	FM 513 / FM 2649 – Campbell, Lone Oak	FM 2649 not signed westbound
Texas	Hopkins	Cumby	111.2	179.0	110	FM 275 / FM 2649 – Cumby	FM 2649 not signed eastbound
Texas	Hopkins		113.7	183.0	112	FM 499	No direct eastbound exit
Texas	Hopkins		116.7	187.8	116	FM 2653 (Brashear Road) – Brashear	
Texas	Hopkins		120.4	193.8	120	Bus. US 67 north	Southern terminus of US 67 Bus.
Texas	Hopkins	Sulphur Springs	123.1	198.1	122	SH 11 / SH 19 (Hillcrest Drive) – Airport	
Texas	Hopkins	Sulphur Springs	124.2	199.9	123	FM 2297 (League Street)	
Texas	Hopkins	Sulphur Springs	125.1	201.3	124	SH 154 (Broadway Street) to SH 11 – Sulphur Springs	
Texas	Hopkins	Sulphur Springs	126.1	202.9	125	Bill Bradford Road	
Texas	Hopkins	Sulphur Springs	127.8	205.7	126	FM 1870 (College Street)	
Texas	Hopkins	Sulphur Springs	128.1	206.2	127	Bus. US 67 south / Loop 301	Northern terminus of US 67 Bus.
Texas	Hopkins		132.2	212.8	131	FM 69	
Texas	Hopkins		136.2	219.2	135	US 67 north	Eastern end of US 67 concurrency
Texas	Hopkins		137.5	221.3	136	FM 269 (Weaver Road)	
Texas	Hopkins		141.8	228.2	141	FM 900 (Saltillo Road)	
Texas	Franklin		143.4	230.8	142	County Line Road	No direct westbound exit
Texas	Franklin	Mount Vernon	147.3	237.1	146	SH 37 – Clarksville, Winnsboro	
Texas	Franklin	Mount Vernon	148.5	239.0	147	Spur 423	
Texas	Franklin		150.8	242.7	150	Ripley Road	
Texas	Titus	Winfield	154.4	248.5	153	Spur 185 – Winfield, Millers Cove	
Texas	Titus		156.8	252.3	156	Frontage Road	
Texas	Titus	Mount Pleasant	161.4	259.7	160	US 271 to US 67 / SH 49 / FM 1734 – Mount Pleasant, Paris, Pittsburg	
Texas	Titus	Mount Pleasant	162.5	261.5	162	Bus. US 271 / FM 1402 / FM 2152 – Mount Pleasant	Signed as exits 162A (Bus. US 271/FM 2152) and 162B (FM 1402) westbound; access to Titus Regional Medical Center
Texas	Titus		166.3	267.6	165	FM 1001	
Texas	Titus		171.1	275.4	170	FM 1993	
Texas	Morris		178.9	287.9	178	US 259 – De Kalb, Daingerfield	
Texas	Bowie		186.5	300.1	186	FM 561	
Texas	Bowie		192.5	309.8	192	FM 990	
Texas	Bowie		198.8	319.9	198	SH 98	
Texas	Bowie		199.8	321.5	199	US 82 – New Boston, De Kalb, Clarksville	
Texas	Bowie	New Boston	202.5	325.9	201	SH 8 – New Boston	
Texas	Bowie		206.7	332.7	206	Spur 86 – TexAmericas Center	
Texas	Bowie		208.2	335.1	207	Spur 594 – Red River Army Depot	
Texas	Bowie	Hooks	209.5	337.2	208	FM 560 – Hooks	
Texas	Bowie	Victory City	212.7	342.3	212	Spur 74 – TexAmericas Center–East	
Texas	Bowie	Leary	214.5	345.2	213	FM 2253 – Leary	
Texas	Bowie	Nash	216.2	347.9	217	Old Red Lick Road	Westbound entrance and eastbound exit; connection to FM 3419 via FM 2148 turnaround
Texas	Bowie	Nash	218.8	352.1	218	FM 989 (Kings Highway) / FM 2878 (Pleasant Grove Road)	
Texas	Bowie		219.3	352.9	219	University Avenue, Pecan Street	Pecan Street not signed westbound
Texas	Bowie	Texarkana	220.4	354.7	220A	I-369 south / US 59 south to US 71 – Houston, Shreveport	Western end of US 59 concurrency; northern terminus of I-369
Texas	Bowie	Texarkana	221.1	355.8	220B	FM 559 (Richmond Road) / Pavilion Parkway	Pavilion Parkway not signed eastbound
Texas	Bowie	Texarkana	222.5	358.1	222	SH 93 / FM 1397 (Summerhill Road)	Access to Christus St. Michael Health System
Texas–Arkansas state line	Bowie–Miller county line	Texarkana	223.74 0.00	360.07 0.00	223	US 59 north / US 71 (State Line Avenue) – Ashdown	Eastern end of US 59 concurrency
Arkansas	Miller	Texarkana	0.8	1.3	1	Jefferson Avenue	
Arkansas	Miller	Texarkana	1.9	3.1	2	Four States Fair Parkway	Former AR 245; access to Texarkana Regional Airport
Arkansas	Miller	Texarkana	3.0	4.8	3	I-49 – Houston, Shreveport, Fort Smith	Signed as exits 3A (south) and 3B (north) eastbound; exits 37A-B on I-49; former AR 549
Arkansas	Miller	Texarkana	6.3	10.1	7	AR 108 – Mandeville	
Arkansas	Miller		11.2	18.0	12	US 67 – Fulton	Eastbound exit and westbound entrance
Arkansas	Hempstead		17.5	28.2	18	Fulton	Access via US 67
Arkansas	Hempstead	Hope	29.7	47.8	30	US 278 – Hope, Nashville	
Arkansas	Hempstead	Hope	30.9	49.7	31	AR 29 – Hope	
Arkansas	Hempstead		36.0	57.9	36	AR 174 east / AR 299 north – Emmet	AR 174 not signed
Arkansas	Nevada	Prescott	43.8	70.5	44	US 371 – Prescott	Former AR 24
Arkansas	Nevada	Prescott	45.8	73.7	46	AR 19 / AR 200 west – Prescott	AR 200 not signed
Arkansas	Clark		53.3	85.8	54	AR 51 – Okolona, Gurdon	
Arkansas	Clark		62.5	100.6	63	AR 53 – Gurdon	
Arkansas	Clark		69.0	111.0	69	AR 26 east – Gum Springs	Western terminus of AR 26
Arkansas	Clark	Arkadelphia	72.4	116.5	73	AR 8 / AR 51 to AR 26 west – Arkadelphia	Access to Crater of Diamonds State Park
Arkansas	Clark	Caddo Valley	77.3	124.4	78	AR 7 (US 67) – Caddo Valley, Arkadelphia, Hot Springs	
Arkansas	Hot Spring		82.3	132.4	83	AR 283 – Friendship	
Arkansas	Hot Spring		90.9	146.3	91	AR 84 – Social Hill	
Arkansas	Hot Spring	Rockport	96.4	155.1	97	AR 84 / AR 171 north	Southern terminus of AR 171
Arkansas	Hot Spring	Rockport	97.8	157.4	98	US 270 west / US 270B east – Hot Springs, Malvern	Western end of US 270 concurrency; western terminus of US 270B; signed as exits 98A (east) and 98B (west)
Arkansas	Hot Spring	Rockport	99.3	159.8	99	US 270 east – Malvern	Eastern end of US 270 concurrency
Arkansas	Saline		106.0	170.6	106	US 67 / Old Military Road	US 67 not signed
Arkansas	Saline		111.0	178.6	111	US 70 west – Hot Springs	Western end of US 70 concurrency
Arkansas	Saline	Benton	113.3	182.3	114	US 67 south / AR 229 – Arkansas Health Center	Western end of US 67 concurrency
Arkansas	Saline	Benton	115.1	185.2	116	Sevier Street / South Street (AR 229 south)	
Arkansas	Saline	Benton	116.5	187.5	117	AR 5 / AR 35 south – Benton	Northern terminus of AR 35
Arkansas	Saline	Benton	117.5	189.1	118	AR 5 / Congo Road	AR 5 not signed
Arkansas	Saline	Benton–Bryant line	120.3	193.6	121	Alcoa Road	
Arkansas	Saline	Bryant	122.6	197.3	123	AR 183 – Bryant, Bauxite	
Arkansas	Saline	Bryant	124.1	199.7	124	Bryant Parkway	
Arkansas	Saline–Pulaski county line	Alexander–Little Rock line	125.9	202.6	126	AR 111 south (Alexander Road) – Alexander	Northern terminus of AR 111
Arkansas	Pulaski	Little Rock	128.3– 128.8	206.5– 207.3	128	Mabelvale West Road / Otter Creek Road / Bass Pro Parkway	
Arkansas	Pulaski	Little Rock	128.3– 128.8	206.5– 207.3	129	I-430 north (US 70 east) – Fort Smith	Southern terminus of I-430; eastern end of US 70 concurrency
Arkansas	Pulaski	Little Rock	130.0	209.2	130	AR 338 (Baseline Road) – Mabelvale	
Arkansas	Pulaski	Little Rock	131.3	211.3	131	McDaniel Drive	Westbound exit only
Arkansas	Pulaski	Little Rock	131.3	211.3	131	Chicot Road	Eastbound exit only
Arkansas	Pulaski	Little Rock	131.9	212.3	132	University Avenue	Former US 70
Arkansas	Pulaski	Little Rock	132.5	213.2	133	Geyer Springs Road	
Arkansas	Pulaski	Little Rock	133.8	215.3	134	Scott Hamilton Drive / Stanton Road	No eastbound access to Stanton Road
Arkansas	Pulaski	Little Rock	135.1	217.4	135	65th Street	
Arkansas	Pulaski	Little Rock	137.5– 137.7	221.3– 221.6	138	I-440 east / I-530 south / US 65 south / US 167 south – Memphis, St. Louis, Airport, Pine Bluff	Western end of US 65/US 167 concurrency; signed as exits 138A (east) and 138B (south) eastbound; exit 1B on I-530
Arkansas	Pulaski	Little Rock	138.6	223.1	139A	AR 365 (Roosevelt Road)	Former routing of US 65
Arkansas	Pulaski	Little Rock	139.4– 139.7	224.3– 224.8	139B	I-630 west	Eastern terminus of I-630
Arkansas	Pulaski	Little Rock	139.4– 139.7	224.3– 224.8	140	Downtown Little Rock	Eastbound exit and westbound entrance
Arkansas	Pulaski	Little Rock	140.5	226.1	140	Downtown Little Rock	Westbound exit and eastbound entrance; access via AR 10
Arkansas	Pulaski	Arkansas River	140.8	226.6	Freeway Bridge		
Arkansas	Pulaski	North Little Rock	141.0– 141.5	226.9– 227.7	141	US 70 (Broadway Street)	
Arkansas	Pulaski	North Little Rock	141.9	228.4	142	Curtis Sykes Drive	No eastbound entrance
Arkansas	Pulaski	North Little Rock	143.02	230.17	143	I-40 / US 65 north / US 67 north / US 167 north / AR 107 north (JFK Boulevard) – Fort Smith, St. Louis, Memphis	Eastern terminus; eastern end of US 65/US 67/US 167 concurrency; signed as exits 143B (east) and 143A (west)
1.000 mi = 1.609 km; 1.000 km = 0.621 mi: Closed/former; Concurrency terminus; Electronic toll collection; HOV only; Incomplete access

== Business routes ==
I-30 formerly had two business routes, both of which were in Arkansas. There are currently no business routes of I-30.

=== Benton ===
Interstate 30 Business
- Location: Benton, AR
- Length: 3.8 mi (6.1 km)
- Existed: c. 1960–c. 1975

Interstate 30 Business (I-30 Bus.) was a business route in Benton, Arkansas. It ran from exit 116 to exit 118 on I-30 from approximately 1960 to 1975, concurrently with US 70C.

=== Little Rock ===
Interstate 30 Business
- Location: Little Rock, AR
- Length: 9.681 mi (15.580 km)
- Existed: c. 1970–c. 2001

Interstate 30 Business (I-30 Bus.) was a business route in Little Rock, Arkansas. The route started at exit 132 on I-30 and followed US 70B nearly its entire route. In North Little Rock, the route remained concurrent with US 70 and terminated at exit 141B on I-30.
