= Red River Bridge (Arkansas) =

- Formerly listed on the U.S. National Register of Historic Places
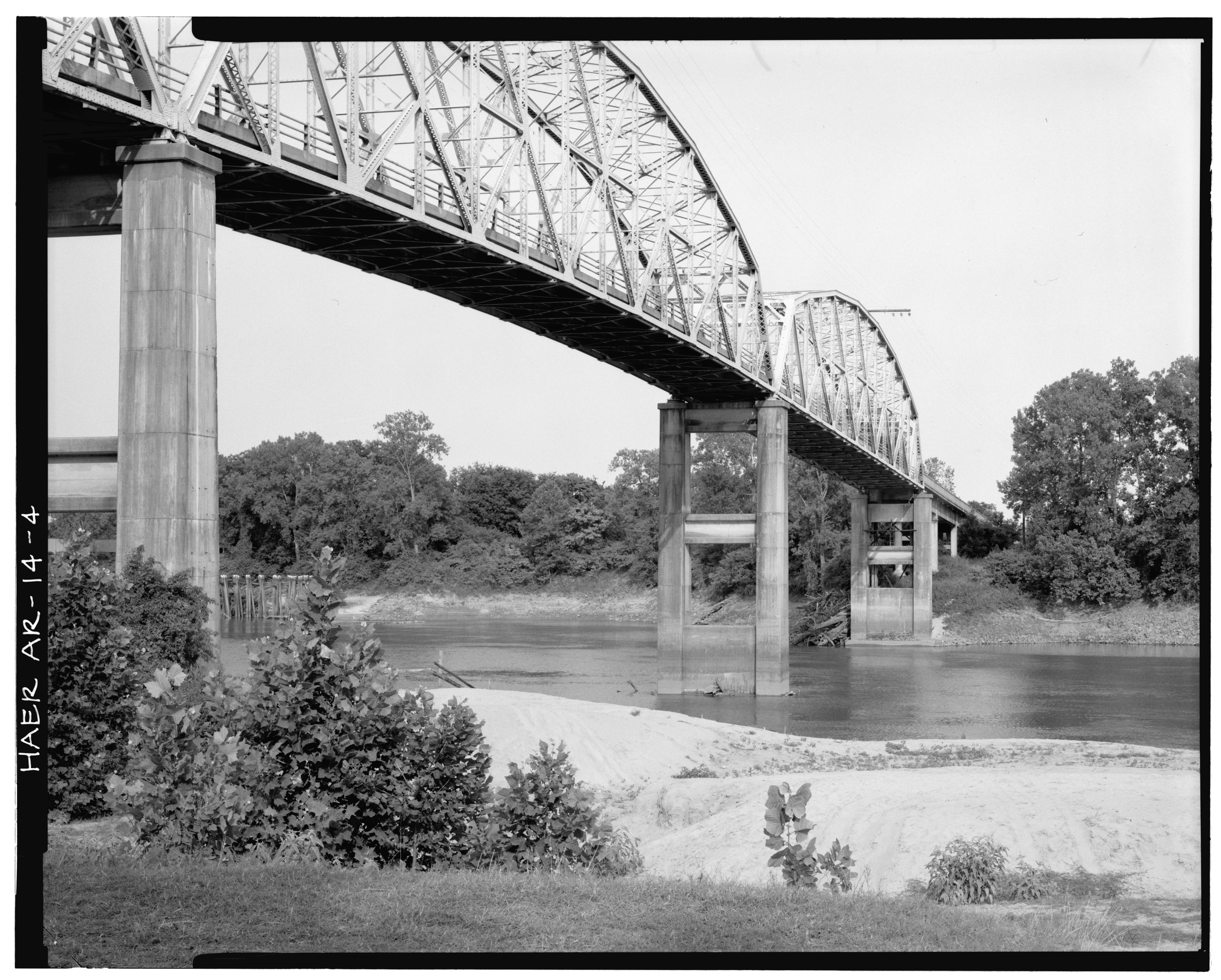
- HAER photo, c. 1988

- Location within Arkansas Location within the United States
- Location: US 82 over the Red River, Garland, Arkansas
- Coordinates: 33°21′21″N 93°42′22″W
- Area: less than one acre
- Built: 1931
- Architect: Ira G. Hedrick; Kansas City Bridge Co.
- Architectural style: Pennsylvania through truss
- MPS: Historic Bridges of Arkansas MPS
- NRHP reference No.: 90000517

Significant dates
- Added to NRHP: April 9, 1990
- Removed from NRHP: August 11, 1999

The Red River Bridge was a truss bridge crossing the Red River at Garland, Arkansas. It carried vehicular traffic from 1931 to 1990 and has since been demolished.

The southwest corner of Arkansas was cut off from the rest of the state by the Red River, which was crossed only by ferries and one railroad bridge until the twentieth century. The bridge at Garland was designed by state highway engineer Ira G. Hedrick in October 1927 and located along the old military road from El Dorado to Texarkana (later to become part of U.S. Route 82). Hedrick's design included three 300-foot (91 m) through spans of Pennsylvania truss.

The winning bid for construction was submitted by the Kansas City Bridge Company, which was given the contract in September 1929. Construction activities for the bridge disturbed traffic through Garland, and this period was marked by conflict between state highway authorities and the city. (The new bridge also threatened the ferry business owned by Garland's Mayor Beasley.) The spans (though not the approaches) were complete by the morning of September 3, 1930, when two dynamite blasts threw the central span from its piers and into the river, doing $150,000 of damage. The motive was thought to be either resentment over the use of non-union labor on the bridge or an attempt to protect the local ferry business. A highway worker arrested in December and was convicted of dynamiting the bridge, but the man he accused of hiring him was acquitted, and no other persons were brought to trial for the crime. The bridge was repaired and opened, without ceremony, on July 15, 1931. Originally opened as a toll bridge, the Arkansas General Assembly made all bridges in the state free in 1938.

In later years, the bridge proved inadequate to support heavy truck traffic on U.S. Route 82. A steel support system was added to the east end in 1986, but the bridge continued to suffer from spalling concrete on the piers. The bridge was documented by the Historic American Engineering Record in 1988. A new bridge was constructed upstream to carry U.S. Route 82 so that the old bridge could be closed. It was added to the National Register of Historic Places in 1990, but was in very poor condition, and it was ultimately demolished and removed from the National Register in 1999.

== See also ==
- List of bridges documented by the Historic American Engineering Record in Arkansas
- List of bridges on the National Register of Historic Places in Arkansas
