= Leary, Texas =

- City
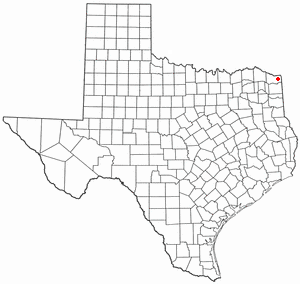
- Location of Leary, Texas

- Coordinates: 33°28′08″N 94°13′08″W
- Country: United States
- State: Texas
- County: Bowie

Area
  - Total: 1.31 sq mi (3.39 km^{2})
  - Land: 1.30 sq mi (3.37 km^{2})
  - Water: 0.0077 sq mi (0.02 km^{2})
- Elevation: 322 ft (98 m)

Population (2020)
  - Total: 433
  - Density: 386.0/sq mi (149.02/km^{2})
- Time zone: UTC-6 (Central (CST))
  - Summer (DST): UTC-5 (CDT)
- ZIP code: 75561
- Area codes: 903, 430
- FIPS code: 48-42028
- GNIS feature ID: 2410813

Leary is a city in Bowie County, Texas, United States. A part of the Texarkana metropolitan area, it had a 2020 census population of 433, a decline from 495 in 2010.

== Geography ==
Leary, in eastern Bowie County, is bordered on the south by U.S. Route 82 and the Red River Army Depot. Interstate 30 passes along the northern edge of the city, with access from exits 212 and 213. Texarkana is 10 miles (16 km) to the east, and New Boston is 12 miles (19 km) to the west. According to the United States Census Bureau, Leary has a total area of 1.3 square miles (3.4 km^{2}), of which 0.0077 square miles (0.02 km^{2}), or 0.68%, is covered by water.

== Demographics ==
Historical population
Census	Pop.	Note	%±
1970	352		—
1980	253		−28.1%
1990	395		56.1%
2000	555		40.5%
2010	495		−10.8%
2020	433		−12.5%
U.S. Decennial Census

=== 2020 census ===
As of the 2020 census, Leary had a population of 433, a median age of 44.1 years, 22.4% of residents under the age of 18, and 23.1% of residents who were 65 years of age or older. For every 100 females there were 94.2 males, and for every 100 females age 18 and over there were 89.8 males age 18 and over.

0.0% of residents lived in urban areas, while 100.0% lived in rural areas.

There were 176 households in Leary, of which 26.1% had children under the age of 18 living in them. Of all households, 50.0% were married-couple households, 14.8% were households with a male householder and no spouse or partner present, and 31.3% were households with a female householder and no spouse or partner present. About 22.2% of all households were made up of individuals, and 13.1% had someone living alone who was 65 years of age or older.

There were 197 housing units, of which 10.7% were vacant. The homeowner vacancy rate was 2.1% and the rental vacancy rate was 0.0%.

Racial composition as of the 2020 census
Race	Number	Percent
White	369	85.2%
Black or African American	14	3.2%
American Indian and Alaska Native	3	0.7%
Asian	1	0.2%
Native Hawaiian and Other Pacific Islander	0	0.0%
Some other race	9	2.1%
Two or more races	37	8.5%
Hispanic or Latino (of any race)	15	3.5%

=== 2000 census ===
According to the 2000 U.S. census, 555 people, 223 households, and 177 families resided in the city. The population density was 214.7 inhabitants per square mile (82.9/km^{2}). The 240 housing units had an average density of 92.9 per square mile (35.9/km^{2}). The racial makeup of the city was 92.07% White, 5.77% African American, 0.54% Native American, 0.36% Asian, 0.36% from other races, and 0.90% from two or more races. Hispanics or Latinos of any race were 1.08% of the population.

Of the 223 households, 27.4% had children under 18 living with them, 62.3% were married couples living together, 11.7% had a female householder with no husband present, and 20.6% were not families. About 19.7% of all households were made up of individuals, and 9.0% had someone living alone who was 65 or older. The average household size was 2.49 and the average family size was 2.82.

In the city, the age distribution was 20.5% under 18, 7.2% from 18 to 24, 24.9% from 25 to 44, 31.0% from 45 to 64, and 16.4% who were 65 or older. The median age was 44 years. For every 100 females, there were 92.7 males. For every 100 females 18 and over, there were 90.9 males.

The median income in the city for a household was $33,295 and for a family was $36,071. Males had a median income of $29,196 versus $16,250 for females. The per capita income for the city was $14,898. About 9.8% of families and 11.2% of the population were below the poverty line, including 18.3% of those under 18 and 7.2% of those 65 or over.

== Education ==
Most of Leary is served by the Leary Independent School District. Small portions of Leary are within the Red Lick and Redwater ISDs.
