= Redwater Independent School District =

School district in Texas

Redwater Independent School District is a public school district based in Redwater, Texas (USA). A very small portion of the district is within the town of Leary, which is uninhabited as it is part of the Red River Army Depot.

In 2009, the school district was rated "recognized" by the Texas Education Agency.

== Schools ==
- Redwater High School (Grades 9‍–‍12)

During 2022‍–‍2023, Redwater High School had an enrollment of 339 students in grades 9‍–‍12 and a student to teacher ratio of 8.83.

- Redwater Junior High (Grades 7‍–‍8)

During 2022‍–‍2023, Redwater Junior High had an enrollment of 180 students in grades 7‍–‍8 and a student to teacher ratio of 11.4.

- Redwater Intermediate (Grades 4‍–‍6)

During 2022‍–‍2023, Redwater Intermediate had an enrollment of 227 students in grades 4‍–‍6 and a student to teacher ratio of 12.15.

- Redwater Elementary (Grades PK‍–‍3)

During 2022‍–‍2023, Redwater Elementary had an enrollment of 313 students in grades PK‍–‍3 and a student to teacher ratio of 11.01.
