= Old Union, Arkansas =

- Unincorporated community
- Location within Arkansas Location within the United States
- Coordinates: 33°14′02″N 92°32′11″W
- Country: United States
- State: Arkansas
- County: Union
- Elevation: 213 ft (65 m)
- Time zone: UTC-6 (Central (CST))
  - Summer (DST): UTC-5 (CDT)
- Area code: 870
- GNIS feature ID: 59783

Old Union is an unincorporated community in Union County, Arkansas, United States.
