= Interstate 49 in Arkansas =

Highway in Arkansas

Interstate 49
- I-49 highlighted in red, AR 549 highlighted in blue

Route information
- Length: 124.31 mi (200.06 km)
- Existed: 2014–present
- NHS: Entire route

Southern segment
- South end: I-49 at the Louisiana state line near Ida, LA
- Major intersections: I-30 in Texarkana
- North end: US 59 / US 71 in Texarkana

Northern segment
- South end: I-40 / US 71 near Alma
- Major intersections: US 62 / AR 180 in Fayetteville; US 412 in Springdale; I-42 in Springdale; US 62 / AR 102 in Rogers
- North end: I-49 at the Missouri state line near Bella Vista

Location
- Country: United States
- State: Arkansas
- Counties: Miller, Sebastian, Crawford, Washington, Benton

Highway system
- Interstate Highway System; Main; Auxiliary; Suffixed; Business; Future; Arkansas Highway System; Interstate; US; State; Business; Spurs; Suffixed; Scenic; Heritage
← AR 48	AR	→ US 49
← I-540	AR Hwy. 549	→ I-555

Interstate 49 (I-49) is an Interstate Highway in the U.S. state of Arkansas. There are two main sections of the highway across different sides of the state. The southern section starts at the Louisiana state line, then runs to Texarkana, at the Texas state line. The northern section begins at I-40 and at U.S. Highway 71 (US 71) in Alma and runs north to the Missouri state line, where the freeway continues into Missouri. An additional small section south of Fort Smith is currently designated as Highway 549 (AR 549) until it is extended northward to the I-40 interchange, at which point it will become part of I-49.

== Route description ==
I-49 enters the state from Louisiana between Ida and Doddridge. The first interchange in Arkansas is with US 71 at exit 4. The Interstate passes near the town of Fouke, where it has another interchange with US 71. The highway enters Texarkana and has an interchange with Highway 151 and runs along the eastern portion of the Texarkana Loop. Between US 82 and US 67, I-49 passes near the Texarkana Regional Airport. The Interstate has an interchange with I-30 before leaving Texarkana. I-49 turns to the west near the Sanderson Lane exit. The Interstate terminates at US 59/US 71. In the Texarkana area, I-49 is known as the Hickerson Freeway, named after Prissy Hickerson.

The Interstate begins again at exit 12 along I-40, one mile (1.6 km) west of Alma, continuing for over 65 miles (105 km) through Crawford, Washington, and Benton counties. It goes through the Ozark Mountains and crosses several large gorge bridges. Just north of the Crawford–Washington county line is the Bobby Hopper Tunnel which is the only large highway tunnel in Arkansas. Notable cities along the route are Fayetteville, Springdale, Rogers, and Bentonville. From I-40 north to Fayetteville, I-49 runs roughly parallel to US 71. Just south of Fayetteville, I-49 combines with US 71 and US 62, forming the major expressway through the northwest Arkansas metro area. US 71 separates from I-49 just south of the Bentonville–Bella Vista city line, where it continues northwest into and through Bella Vista as Bella Vista Way, the city's main thoroughfare. I-49 instead continues westward then northward known as the Bella Vista Bypass, running just to the south and west of the city before continuing into Missouri.

=== Transit ===
Jefferson Lines provides intercity bus service along the length of I-49 in Arkansas serving Fayetteville and Fort Smith.

== History ==
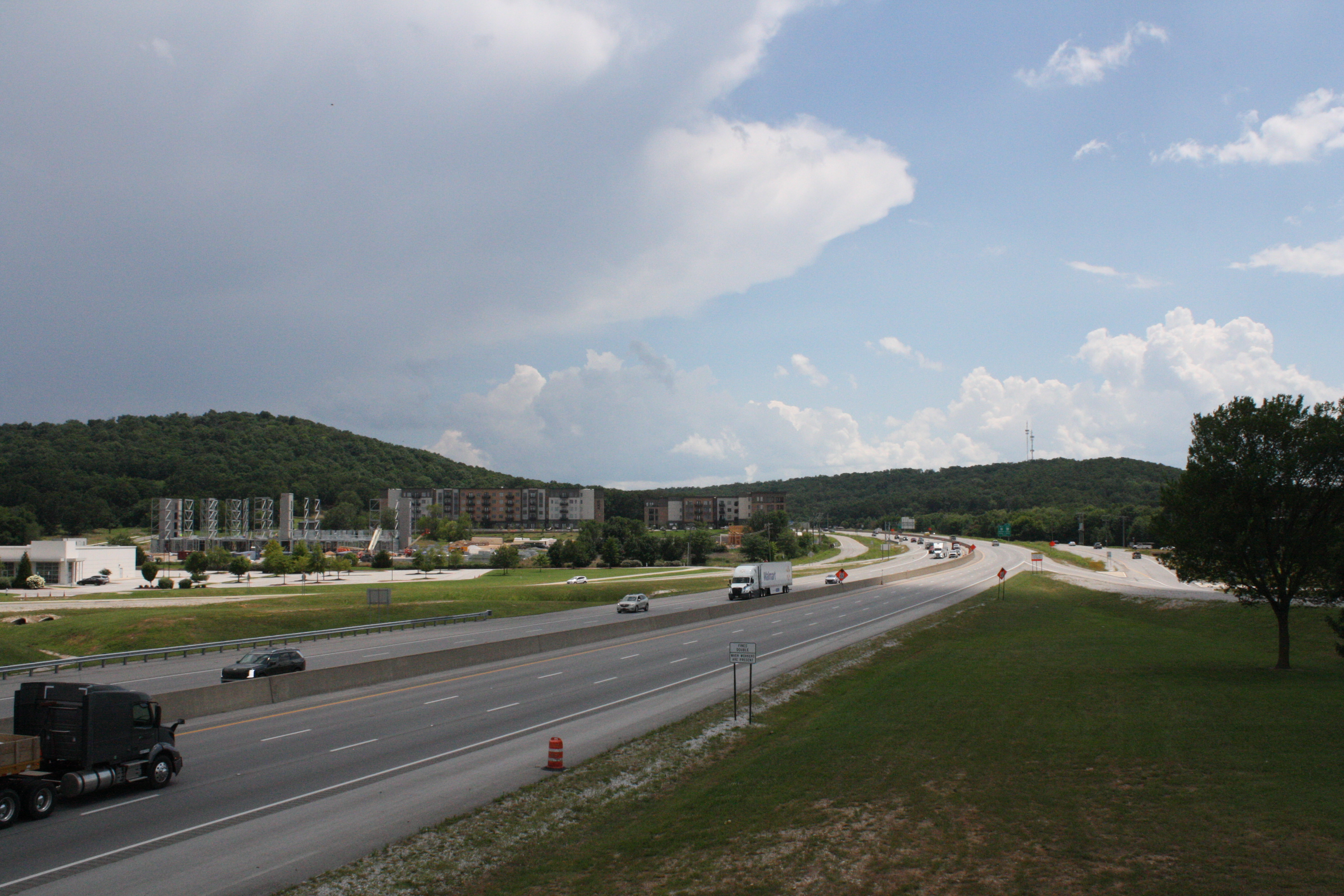
Looking south along I-49 at the Wedington Drive overpass in Fayetteville

The first portion of what would become I-49 was completed in the late 1990s and was opened to Mountainburg as AR 540. On January 8, 1999, the road was fully opened to traffic and was re-designated part of an extension of I-540, with the name "John Paul Hammerschmidt Highway", in honor of a former US Representative from Arkansas. Having been planned since the early 1970s, it created a bypass for the older US 71. The state of Arkansas had originally asked the American Association of State Highway and Transportation Officials (AASHTO) to allow this extension, between Fort Smith and Bentonville as I-49, to emphasize plans to extend the route from Shreveport, Louisiana, through Arkansas to Kansas City, Missouri. AASHTO denied the request, and the route instead opened in 1999 as a northern extension of I-540. However, this route would eventually be redesignated as I-49 in 2014 when the first leg of the Bella Vista Bypass opened. The exit numbers are still numbered from when it was I-540. From AR 72 (exit 88) to AR 16 (exit 62), the highway was upgraded to a 6-lane freeway (3 lanes in each direction).

AHTD conducted a feasibility study of adding an interchange at AR 162 in Van Buren in 1991, with the results adopted by the Arkansas State Highway Commission in 1992. The Arkansas State Highway Commission (ASHC) studied a designation for I-540 between Mountainburg and Fayetteville as an Arkansas Scenic Byway in a meeting on November 17, 1998. One of the requirements of designation is "an active organization composed of various private and governmental groups, businesses, and agencies who are interested in preservation, enhancement, marketing, and development of the route's scenic, cultural, recreational, and historic qualities". The ASHC deemed that, since the highway was a new location route, it did not have sufficient businesses to satisfy the requirement, so the ASHC deemed itself a partner organization and proceeded with a designation study. The route was added to the scenic byway system the following year.

I-49 between I-30 and US 71 was finished in May 2013. The route to the Louisiana border was completed and opened on November 10, 2014. The segment was originally going to be designated as I-130, but it was changed to I-49 in 2013. The route to the Missouri border was completed and opened on October 1, 2021. On May 15, 2023, work began to renumber the northernmost four exits to correlate with the correct log mile designations.

Highway 549 (AR 549) is a temporary designation the Arkansas Department of Transportation (ArDOT) is currently using to designate opened sections of freeway that have not yet officially become part of I-49. There are three instances in which ArDOT has used this designation.

=== Arkansas Highway 549 (south of Texarkana-Texarkana) ===
Highway 549
- Location: south of Texarkana-Texarkana
- Length: 41.94 mi (67.50 km)
- Existed: 2004–2014

The first section of road to be designated as AR 549 is now the section of I-49 in the southern part of the state. AR 549 was first opened to traffic in December 2004 as a 29.49-mile (47.46 km) route between Texarkana and Fouke. A second section, between Fouke and Doddridge, opened on October 21, 2005. A third section between Arkansas Boulevard in Texarkana and US 71 north of Texarkana opened on May 15, 2013. A fourth section 14 miles (23 km) long opened on November 10, 2014, when it officially became part of I-49. At its final length, it was 41.94 miles (67.50 km).

=== Arkansas Highway 549 (Benton County) ===
Highway 549
- Location: Benton County
- Length: 9 mi (14 km)
- Existed: 2014–2021

The second section of road to be designated as AR 549 was the Bella Vista Bypass in the northern part of the state. It bypasses Bella Vista, Arkansas hence the project name. The Bella Vista Bypass was first opened to traffic on April 22, 2014, as a three-mile (4.8 km) two-lane freeway bypassing Hiwasse, now part of the town of Gravette. The route was eventually extended to Rocky Dell Hollow Road west of Bella Vista on May 13, 2015, and I-49/US 71 in Bentonville in 2017 with ribbon cutting on May 10, 2017, which included a roundabout at the US 71 and then terminus of I-49. The Bella Vista Bypass was planned to be expanded to four lanes, connect directly into I-49 at its south end, and extend north into Missouri, having an interchange with Missouri Route 90 and rejoining US 71 near Pineville, Missouri. The groundbreaking on the final section between Rocky Dell Hollow Road and the Missouri state line occurred on October 15, 2019. The bypass opened to traffic on October 1, 2021, following a ceremonial ribbon cutting held the previous day, per ArDOT. With that, I-49 is now continuous from Kansas City, Missouri, to Alma, Arkansas. Additionally, as part of the project, the interchange with US 71/U.S. Highway 71 Business (US 71B) on the southern end of the 19-mile (31 km) bypass was reconstructed from a trumpet interchange into a single-point urban interchange, the first interchange of its type in Arkansas. The interchange was temporarily reconfigured as a roundabout interchange during construction on the bypass. The roundabout that opened in 2017 was removed. The existing Bella Vista Bypass was upgraded to a four-lane highway.

=== Arkansas Highway 549 (Fort Smith) ===
Highway 549
- Location: Fort Smith
- Length: 6.49 mi (10.44 km)
- Existed: 2015–present

The third section of road to be designated as AR 549 is a 6.5-mile (10.5 km) orphaned section bypassing Fort Smith. The section, which runs between US 71 and AR 22 and AR 255, opened to traffic following a ribbon-cutting ceremony on July 14, 2015. The designation is planned to be replaced with I-49 when the new roadway is constructed from AR 22 to I-40.

== Future ==
Eventually, I-49 will cross the entire state. It will cross into Texas for about 5 to 10 miles (8.0 to 16.1 km) and then cross over a not-yet-built bridge across the Red River into Arkansas. It will eventually reach De Queen, Arkansas, in the near future. It will then run near the western border of the state from De Queen to Fort Smith and will run parallel to US 71.

The stretch near Fort Smith is funded because voters passed Issue 1, the Connecting Arkansas Program (permanent extension of 0.5-cent road tax approved in 2012). It would have lasted for ten years (until June 30, 2023). At that time, it raised $1.8 billion. The annual impact for one year: an estimated $300 million.The estimated cost of this stretch is at $787 million, including the bridge over the Arkansas River ($300–$400 million).

In July 2021, ArDOT announced that they will be progressing to the next phase of development on the 13.6-mile (21.9 km) segment between AR 22 in Barling (project start point) and I-49 in Alma (project end point). This segment needs to be reevaluated because the approval was issued in December 1997 (named "US 71 relocation" in those documents) and has since essentially expired. The I-40 to AR 22 segment was reevaluated in 2021. This likely means that the section from Fort Smith to Texarkana (approved at the same time also) will also need to be reevaluated. The segment will connect to the existing AR 549 on the northern end. The department is also cooperating with the Federal Highway Administration (FHWA) on this project.

In 2022, some studies to reduce the cost was made. The height of the planned bridge over the Arkansas River was shortened. The new roadway will open as a 4-lane meaning it can be designated as I-49. In addition, the existing roadway designated as AR 549 will be redesignated as I-49. On October 13, 2022, groundbreaking began on the proposed southern extension of Future I-49 with construction expected to occur 2025 and should be completed by 2035 at latest. Phase 1 will be from AR 22 to H Street. Phase 2 will be from H Street to I-40. The Issue 1 approved in 2020 helped fund the project. This segment was estimated to cost $800 million, almost half of which is going to the bridge over the Arkansas River, although a more recent estimate priced the bridge at $250 million, raising up to $1 billion in 2024.ArDOT has mentioned that, after this project, they may work on extending to I-49 southward to Y City.

On August 22, 2025, ARDOT broke ground on the Interstate 49 Arkansas River Bridge with its completion set for early-2029. This came after they started clearing trees and rocks in the area of the future bridge earlier in July 2025. The following month in early-September 2025, ARDOT announced that preliminary engineering to extend I-49 from Barling to Y City had begun, although a construction timeline was not established at that time.

On May 25, 2023, ARDOT announced the proposal of a new north–south route to connect AR 642 near the Northwest Arkansas National Airport to the Bella Vista bypass (I-49) near Centerton.

== Exit list ==
State	County	Location	mi	km	Old exit	New exit (Note: Exit numbers on the section of I-49 from I-40 to the Missouri border is based on the former I-540 exit numbering; others are based on the mileage from the Louisiana state line.)	Destinations	Notes
Arkansas	Miller		0.00	0.00			I-49 south – Shreveport	Continuation into Louisiana
Arkansas	Miller		4.27	6.87		4	US 71 – Doddridge	
Arkansas	Miller		7.15	11.51		6	CR 197	
Arkansas	Miller		16.73	26.92		16	US 71 – Fouke	
Arkansas	Miller		18.34	29.52		18	North Fouke Road	
Arkansas	Miller		23.93	38.51		24	CR 10 – Ferguson	
Arkansas	Miller		26.58	42.78		26	AR 237	
Arkansas	Miller	Texarkana	28.87– 29.72	46.46– 47.83		29A	US 71 – Texarkana	Signed as exit 29 southbound
Arkansas	Miller	Texarkana	28.87– 29.72	46.46– 47.83		29B	To US 59 (I-369 north) – Dallas, Houston	Access via AR 151; exit number not signed southbound
Arkansas	Miller	Texarkana	31.19	50.20		31	AR 196 (Genoa Road)	
Arkansas	Miller	Texarkana	32.42	52.17		32	US 82 (9th Street) / 19th Street	
Arkansas	Miller	Texarkana	33.66	54.17		—	US 67 – Texarkana	Closed
Arkansas	Miller	Texarkana	34.59	55.67		35	Four States Fair Parkway / Arkansas Boulevard	Access to Texarkana Regional Airport
Arkansas	Miller	Texarkana	36.64	58.97		37	I-30 east – Hope, Little Rock I-30 west – Texarkana, Dallas	Signed as exits 37A (east) and 37B (west); exits 3A-B on I-30
Arkansas	Miller		39.95	64.29		41	Sanderson Lane	
Arkansas–Texas state line	Miller–Bowie county line		41.49	66.77		42	US 71 north (US 59) – Ashdown, Fort Smith US 71 south (US 59) – Texarkana	Current northern terminus; at-grade intersection; exit number not signed; Texarkana not signed
Texas	Bowie					44	I-369 south – Houston	ProposedAs of 2025, completion of the NE segment (I-369) of the Texarkana Loop extension remains an unfunded proposal.
Texas	Bowie					46	CR 2320 (Hush Puppy Road)	Proposed
Red River					Bridge over Red River; Bowie–Little River county line Texas–Arkansas state line			
Arkansas	Little River					51	CR 23	Proposed
Arkansas	Little River					55	AR 32 – Ashdown	Proposed
Arkansas	Little River					57	AR 108	Proposed
Arkansas	Little River	Wilton				60	AR 234 – Wilton	Proposed
Arkansas	Sevier					84	US 59 / US 70 / US 71 / US 371 – De Queen	Proposed
Arkansas	Sevier					93	CR 41 (Tower Road) – Gillham	Proposed
Arkansas	Polk	Grannis				98	CR 3 – Grannis	Proposed
Arkansas	Polk					102	US 278 – Wickes	Proposed
Arkansas	Polk					108	AR 246 – Vandervoort	Proposed
Arkansas	Polk					121	Boundary Road - Mena	Proposed
Arkansas	Polk					126	AR 88 – Mena	Proposed
Arkansas	Polk					132	CR 70	Proposed
Arkansas	Scott	"Y" City				143	US 71 / US 270	Proposed
Arkansas	Scott					157	AR 80 – Waldron	Proposed
Arkansas	Scott					160	AR 28	Proposed
Arkansas	Scott					165	AR 378	Proposed
Arkansas	Scott	Mansfield				171	US 71 – Mansfield	Proposed
Arkansas	Sebastian					175	US 71 – Huntington	Proposed
Arkansas	Sebastian					183	AR 10 – Greenwood	Proposed
Arkansas	Sebastian		0.00	0.00		187	US 71 – Fort Smith	Opened July 14, 2015 as AR 549; current southern terminus of AR 549; future southern terminus of I-49; at-grade intersection
Arkansas	Sebastian	Fort Smith	3.04	4.89		190	Massard Road	Opened July 14, 2015 as AR 549
Arkansas	Sebastian	Fort Smith	4.47	7.19		191	Roberts Boulevard	Opened July 14, 2015 as AR 549
Arkansas	Sebastian	Barling	6.49	10.44		193	AR 22 (Fort Street) / AR 255 – Barling	Opened July 14, 2015 as AR 549; current northern terminus of AR 549
Arkansas	Arkansas River				Bridge; Sebastian–Crawford county line			
Arkansas	Crawford		9.67	15.56		196	To AR 59 / Gun Club Road – Van Buren	Under construction; to be open by 2029
Arkansas	Crawford	Kibler	15.24	24.53		17	To AR 162 / Clear Creek Road – Kibler	Construction to begin in 2027; future exit 202
Arkansas	Crawford		19.23	30.95		20	I-40 (US 71) – Van Buren, Fort Smith, Alma, Little Rock	Signed as exits 20A (east) and 20B (west); current southern terminus of I-49; exit 12 on I-40
Arkansas	Crawford	Alma	20.31	32.69		21	Collum Lane	
Arkansas	Crawford		23.67	38.09		24	AR 282 – Rudy	
Arkansas	Crawford		29.10	46.83		29	To AR 282 – Mountainburg	Access via AR 282S
Arkansas	Crawford		33.53	53.96		34	AR 282 – Chester	
Arkansas	Washington		41.14– 41.44	66.21– 66.69	Bobby Hopper Tunnel			
Arkansas	Washington	Winslow	44.99	72.40		45	AR 74 – Winslow	
Arkansas	Washington	West Fork	52.78	84.94		53	AR 156 west / AR 170 – West Fork	
Arkansas	Washington	Greenland	57.88	93.15		58	Greenland	
Arkansas	Washington	Fayetteville	60.50	97.37		60	US 71 south (South Fulbright Expressway) / AR 16 east (Razorback Road) / AR 265 south (Cato Springs Road)	US 71 not signed
Arkansas	Washington	Fayetteville	61.98	99.75		61	US 71 south (South Fulbright Expressway) – Fayetteville	Southern end of US 71 concurrency; southbound exit and northbound entrance
Arkansas	Washington	Fayetteville	61.98	99.75		61	To US 62 west (West 15th Street) – Fayetteville	Proposed; northbound exit and southbound entrance; future exit 246
Arkansas	Washington	Fayetteville	61.98	99.75		62	US 62 west / AR 180 east (Martin Luther King Jr. Boulevard)	Southern end of US 62 concurrency
Arkansas	Washington	Fayetteville	63.79	102.66		64	AR 16 west / AR 16S east (Wedington Drive)	
Arkansas	Washington	Fayetteville	64.74	104.19		65	Stephen Carr Memorial Boulevard	Porter Road rededicated in July 2022,
Arkansas	Washington	Fayetteville	66.96	107.76		67A	AR 112 (Garland Avenue)	Access to University of Arkansas
Arkansas	Washington	Fayetteville	67.43	108.52		67B	US 71B north (North Fulbright Expressway)	Interchange opened in November 2017; access to Washington Regional Medical Center and Fayetteville Historic District
Arkansas	Washington	Johnson	69.88	112.46		69	Johnson Mill Boulevard	
Arkansas	Washington	Springdale	70.97	114.22		70	Don Tyson Parkway	Opened July 7, 2014;
Arkansas	Washington	Springdale	72.45	116.60		72	US 412 (Sunset Avenue)	
Arkansas	Washington	Springdale	73.86	118.87		73	Elm Springs Road	
Arkansas	Benton	Springdale	76.15	122.55		76	Wagon Wheel Road	
Arkansas	Benton	Springdale	77.55	124.80		77	I-42 west (Springdale Northern Bypass) – Elm Springs, Cave Springs	Current eastern terminus and exit 10 on I-42; eastern terminus of I-42; access to Northwest Arkansas National Airport
Arkansas	Benton	Springdale	77.55	124.80		77	AR 612 east (Springdale Northern Bypass)	Proposed
Arkansas	Benton	Lowell	78.90	126.98		78	AR 264 (West Monroe Avenue)	
Arkansas	Benton	Rogers	81.01	130.37		81	Pleasant Grove Road	
Arkansas	Benton	Rogers	82.79	133.24		82	Promenade Boulevard / West Pauline Whittaker Parkway	
Arkansas	Benton	Rogers	83.90	135.02		83	Pinnacle Hills Parkway / West New Hope Road	Future exit 268
Arkansas	Benton	Rogers–Bentonville line	85.30	137.28		85	US 71B south (West Walnut Street) / SE Walton Boulevard	
Arkansas	Benton	Bentonville	86.80	139.69		86	US 62 east (Hudson Road) / AR 102 west (SE 14th Street)	Northern end of US 62 concurrency
Arkansas	Benton	Bentonville	87.29	140.48		87	8th Street	
Arkansas	Benton	Bentonville	88.81	142.93		88	AR 72 east (East Central Avenue)	Signed as exits 88A (east) and 88B (west) northbound
Arkansas	Benton	Bentonville	92.49	148.85	93	91	US 71 north – Bentonville, Bella Vista	Northern end of US 71 concurrency; access to Bentonville via N. Walton Blvd.; single-point urban interchange;
Arkansas	Benton	Gravette	98.28	158.17	99	97	AR 72 – Centerton	
Arkansas	Benton	Gravette	101.23	162.91	102	100	AR 72 – Gravette	
Arkansas	Benton	Bella Vista	103.63	166.78	104	102	CR 34 (Rocky Dell Hollow Road)	
Arkansas	Benton						I-49 north – Joplin	Continuation into Missouri
1.000 mi = 1.609 km; 1.000 km = 0.621 mi: Concurrency terminus; Incomplete access; Unopened

== See also ==
- Boston Mountains Scenic Loop

== Notes ==
Interstate 49
Previous state: Louisiana	Arkansas	Next state: Texas
Previous state: Texas	Arkansas	Next state: Missouri
