= Interstate 369 (Texas) =

Auxiliary Interstate Highway in Bowie County, Texas, United States

Interstate 369
- I-369 highlighted in solid red; proposed corridor in pink

Route information
- Auxiliary route of I-69
- Maintained by TxDOT
- Length: 4.206 mi (6.769 km) Total proposed length after completion is 117 miles (188 km)
- Existed: September 23, 2013–present
- NHS: Entire route

Major junctions
- South end: US 59 / SH 93 / Loop 151 in Texarkana
- US 67 in Texarkana; US 82 in Texarkana
- North end: I-30 / US 59 in Texarkana

Location
- Country: United States
- State: Texas
- Counties: Bowie

Highway system
- Interstate Highway System; Main; Auxiliary; Suffixed; Business; Future; Highways in Texas; Interstate; US; State; Former; Toll; Loops; Spurs; FM/RM; Park; Rec
← SH 365	→ US 380

Interstate 369 (I-369 (Note: Some sources use "IH-369", as "IH" is an abbreviation used by TxDOT for Interstate Highways.)) is an incomplete north–south auxiliary Interstate Highway currently within Texarkana, Texas. Once complete, the freeway will run approximately 117 miles (188 km) through Northeast Texas beginning at an interchange with I-69 east of Tenaha and head northward to Carthage, Marshall, Jefferson, and Atlanta to its current northern terminus at I-30. For its entire length, I-369 is concurrent with US 59.

== Route description ==
I-369 currently begins at US 59 and Loop 151 and runs three miles (4.8 km) north where it currently ends at I-30. It does not currently connect with I-69 in the south and I-49 in the north.

== History ==
The Intermodal Surface Transportation Efficiency Act (ISTEA) of 1991 designated US 59 in Texas from Laredo to Texarkana as High Priority Corridor #20.

At its meeting on November 15, 2012, the American Association of State Highway and Transportation Officials (AASHTO) approved a 118-mile-long (190 km) highway to be numbered I-369, to connect I-69 in Tenaha to I-30 in Texarkana. The Federal Highway Administration (FHWA) approved the designation on May 24, 2013, and the Texas Transportation Commission followed suit on May 30, 2013. This action also finalized the designations of other Interstates in Texas. This action meant that the Texas Department of Transportation (TxDOT) could commence the signing of I-369, as well as the other route segments cited, at their discretion. The signage was installed and revealed on September 23, 2013. New signage that included exit numbers and mileposts corresponding to the whole proposed length was installed the week of June 22, 2020.

== Future ==
Plans call for I-369 to begin at US 59/US 84/Future I-69 in Tenaha, then head north along US 59, serving Carthage, Marshall, Jefferson, and Atlanta before entering Texarkana and merging onto its current routing at the western terminus of Loop 151 and terminating at I-30. The status of the Texarkana to Tenaha segment is unfinished; most of it is currently only in the planning and development stage, although a few construction projects have been started.

In 2001, an EIS was approved to complete a northern half of a loop around Texarkana. In 2013 Arkansas finished construction on the eastern half of that loop, extending Interstate 49 to US 71 which is located on the state border. As of 2025, no funding has been allocated by Texas to build the western half of the approved loop which, if built, presumably would get the I-369 designation.

The proposed routing of I-369 in the Marshall area has the Interstate running east of the city and using part of the existing Loop 390 corridor. Construction, which was slated to begin in 2025 before being pushed out to 2026 then moved to early 2028, will be done in three phases. The first phase (the middle section) will extend Loop 390 southward US 80 east of Marshall southward to I-20. Frontage roads will also be constructed along both I-20 and Loop 390 along with multiple new bridges, underpasses, and roundabouts. The other two phases, both of which are currently unfunded with construction not scheduled to start until 2033 or 2034, will be to extend and upgrade parts Loop 390 to reconnect back to the current US 59 both north and south of Marshall.

Public feedback on the middle section, which will would require 536 acres (217 ha) of new right-of-way and potentially displace 25 residences, four commercial buildings, and two utility locations, was requested in September 2023. Another project to upgrade the US 59/Farm to Market Road 1794 intersection in Grand Bluff to an interchange is currently under construction, completion is set for 2025.

Studies on upgrades on US 59 between Queen City and Texarkana began in mid-2017 and ended in September 2018. Public feedback for the upgrades was also requested from late July to mid-August 2018. The existing section of the US 59 corridor will be upgraded. Although currently unfunded, TxDOT anticipates letting sections of this project in either 2033 or 2034.

== Exit list ==
The entire highway is in Texarkana, Bowie County.

mi	km	Exit	Destinations	Notes
111.0	178.6	111A	US 59 south / SH 93 north / Loop 151 east to I-49 / FM 3527 – Houston	Current southern terminus; southern end of US 59 concurrency; western terminus of Loop 151; southern terminus of SH 93
111.6	179.6	111B	Frontage Road	Southbound exit and northbound entrance
112.6	181.2	112	US 67 (7th Street)	
113.6	182.8	113	Westlawn Drive / Redwater Road – Wake Village	
114.3	183.9	114A	US 82 (New Boston Road)	Signed as exit 114 southbound
114.6	184.4	114B	FM 559 (Richmond Road)	Northbound exit only
115.0	185.1	115	I-30 / US 59 north / University Avenue – Little Rock, Dallas	Northern terminus; northern end of US 59 concurrency; exit 220A on I-30
1.000 mi = 1.609 km; 1.000 km = 0.621 mi: Concurrency terminus; Incomplete access; Unopened
