= Redwater, Texas =

- City
- Seal

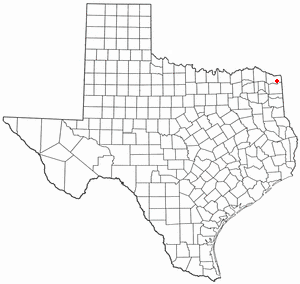
- Location of Redwater, Texas

- Coordinates: 33°21′31″N 94°15′08″W
- Country: United States
- State: Texas
- County: Bowie

Area
  - Total: 1.99 sq mi (5.16 km^{2})
  - Land: 1.99 sq mi (5.15 km^{2})
  - Water: 0 sq mi (0.00 km^{2})
- Elevation: 292 ft (89 m)

Population (2020)
  - Total: 853
  - Density: 553.2/sq mi (213.59/km^{2})
- Time zone: UTC-6 (Central (CST))
  - Summer (DST): UTC-5 (CDT)
- ZIP code: 75573
- Area codes: 903, 430
- FIPS code: 48-61340
- GNIS feature ID: 2410918
- Website: redwatertexas.com

Redwater is a city in Bowie County, Texas, United States. The population was 853 at the 2020 census. It is part of the Texarkana metropolitan area.

== History ==
Redwater is twelve miles southwest of Texarkana in southeastern Bowie County. It grew up in the mid-1870s around a sawmill operated by two men named Daniels and Spence, who named the community Ingersoll, in honor of the agnostic Robert Ingersoll. A post office was established in 1881, and by 1884 the town had an estimated population of fifty.

In 1886 a big revival meeting was held in the town, which resulted in about 110 conversions. Shortly after the meeting residents of the town, no longer wishing to honor the agnostic, decided that the name of the town should be changed. They had just completed a new well that yielded red water, and the town was renamed for this feature. The name of the post office was not officially changed until 1894. Although the population of the town swelled to an estimated 300 by 1892, by 1900 it had fallen to 128. It reached 250 in the 1920s.

During World War II the Red River Army Depot and Lone Star Army Ammunition Plant were built just north of Redwater, providing thousands of jobs for county residents. The population of Redwater jumped from 250 in the early 1940s to 457 by 1950. In 1982 Redwater had a population of 460 and five rated businesses. In 1990 the population was 894.

Redwater is also home to the first recorded set of quadruplets in the United States.

== Geography ==
According to the United States Census Bureau, the city has a total area of 2.0 square miles (5.2 km^{2}), all land.

== Demographics ==
Historical population
Census	Pop.	Note	%±
1990	824		—
2000	872		5.8%
2010	1,057		21.2%
2020	853		−19.3%
U.S. Decennial Census

=== 2020 census ===
As of the 2020 census, Redwater had a population of 853. The median age was 37.7 years. 23.8% of residents were under the age of 18 and 15.8% of residents were 65 years of age or older. For every 100 females there were 97.9 males, and for every 100 females age 18 and over there were 90.6 males age 18 and over.

0.0% of residents lived in urban areas, while 100.0% lived in rural areas.

There were 332 households in Redwater, of which 37.7% had children under the age of 18 living in them. Of all households, 43.7% were married-couple households, 18.7% were households with a male householder and no spouse or partner present, and 32.2% were households with a female householder and no spouse or partner present. About 22.0% of all households were made up of individuals and 9.3% had someone living alone who was 65 years of age or older.

There were 389 housing units, of which 14.7% were vacant. The homeowner vacancy rate was 3.1% and the rental vacancy rate was 12.9%.

Racial composition as of the 2020 census
Race	Number	Percent
White	715	83.8%
Black or African American	63	7.4%
American Indian and Alaska Native	11	1.3%
Asian	3	0.4%
Native Hawaiian and Other Pacific Islander	0	0.0%
Some other race	3	0.4%
Two or more races	58	6.8%
Hispanic or Latino (of any race)	32	3.8%

=== 2010 census ===
According to the 2010 census, there were 1,057 people in the city. The population density was 446.7 inhabitants per square mile (172.5/km^{2}). There were 357 housing units at an average density of 182.9 units per square mile (70.6 units/km^{2}). The racial makeup of the city was 87.27% White, 9.98% African American, 0.80% Native American, and 1.95% from two or more races. Hispanic or Latino of any race were 1.26% of the population.

There were 330 households, out of which 40.6% had children under the age of 18 living with them, 56.1% were married couples living together, 13.3% had a female householder with no husband present, and 25.5% were non-families. 23.0% of all households were made up of individuals, and 8.5% had someone living alone who was 65 years of age or older. The average household size was 2.64 and the average family size was 3.10.

In the city, the population was spread out, with 29.2% under the age of 18, 10.6% from 18 to 24, 28.2% from 25 to 44, 19.8% from 45 to 64, and 12.2% who were 65 years of age or older. The median age was 33 years. For every 100 females, there were 96.8 males. For every 100 females age 18 and over, there were 89.8 males.

The median income for a household in the city was $31,111, and the median income for a family was $38,000. Males had a median income of $30,600 versus $19,667 for females. The per capita income for the city was $13,843. About 10.9% of families and 16.6% of the population were below the poverty line, including 22.2% of those under age 18 and 17.1% of those age 65 or over.

== Education ==
The City of Redwater is served by the Redwater Independent School District.
