= Leary Independent School District =

School district in Texas

District information
- Grades: PK-8
- Schools: 1

Students and staff
- Students: 105
- Student–teacher ratio: 9:1

Other information
- Website: http://www.learyisd.net/

Leary Independent School District (LISD) is a public school district based in Leary, Texas (USA).

The district has one school that serves students in pre-kindergarten through eighth grade.

In the 2021–2022 school year, LISD had 105 students with 36.2% considered at-risk of dropping out. The average teacher's salary is $44,425, $14,462 less than the state average. Teachers at LISD have an average of 10.8 years of experience. For the 2021–2022 school year, the school received an accountability rating of C. Student-to-teacher ratio is 9:1. The district's enrollment for minorities is 30%. 97.1% of students in Leary ISD are economically disadvantaged.

In 2009, the school district was rated "recognized" by the Texas Education Agency.
