= Mandeville, Arkansas =

Unincorporated community in Arkansas, US

Mandeville is an unincorporated community in Miller County, Arkansas, United States.

Mandeville is the location of Old US 67, Mandeville, which is listed on the National Register of Historic Places, and described as being at AR 296, Miller County Road 138 and southeast of the current US 67.

It is located within the Texarkana metropolitan area.
