= Texarkana Regional Airport =

Airport in Arkansas, USA

Texarkana Regional Airport Webb Field

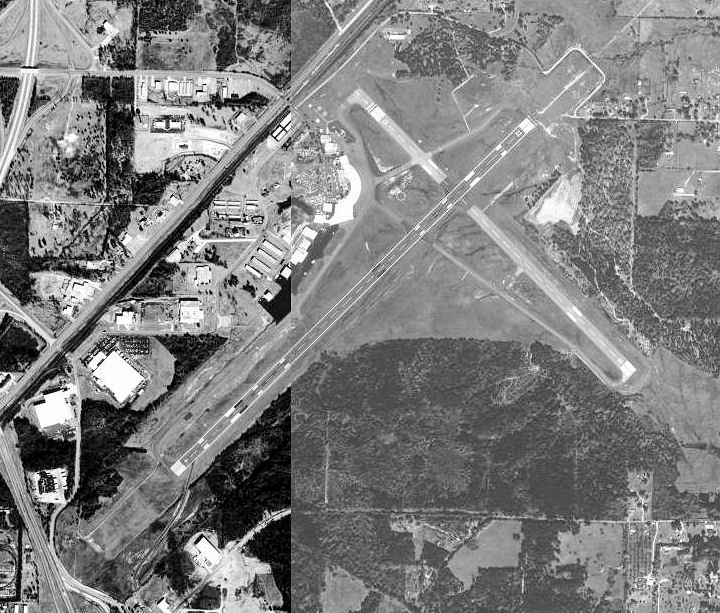
- USGS 2000 orthophoto
- IATA: TXK; ICAO: KTXK; FAA LID: TXK

Summary
- Airport type: Public
- Owner: Texarkana Airport Authority
- Serves: Texarkana
- Elevation AMSL: 390 ft (120 m)
- Coordinates: 33°27′13″N 093°59′28″W
- Website: txkairport.com

Map
- Location of airport in Arkansas TXK (the United States)

Runways
Direction	Length		Surface
Direction	ft	m	Surface
4/22	6,601	2,012	Asphalt
13/31	5,200	1,585	Asphalt

Statistics (2019)
- Passengers: 73,160
- Aircraft operations: 32,598
- Based aircraft: 52
- Source: Bureau of Transportation Statistics, Federal Aviation Administration

Texarkana Regional Airport (IATA: TXK, ICAO: KTXK, FAA LID: TXK), also known as Webb Field, is a public use airport located three nautical miles (6 km) northeast of the central business district of Texarkana, a city in Miller County, Arkansas, United States. It is owned by the Texarkana Airport Authority. The airport is located within the city limits of Texarkana, roughly 3 miles east of State Line Avenue. The front gate opens to the northwest, at the intersection of Arkansas Boulevard and U.S. Route 67. A Union Pacific Railroad line runs parallel to US 67 on the side of the highway facing the airport. It is mostly used for general aviation, but is also served by American Eagle with nonstop regional jet service to the American Airlines hub located at the Dallas/Fort Worth International Airport (DFW).

According to Bureau of Transportation Statistics records, the airport handled 73,280 passengers in 2018, 73,160 passengers in 2019, and just 33,930 passengers in 2020. It is included in the National Plan of Integrated Airport Systems for 2017–2021, which categorized it as a primary commercial service airport (greater than 10,000 enplanements per year).

== Facilities and aircraft ==
Texarkana Regional-Webb Field covers an area of 964 acres (390 ha) at an elevation of 390 feet (119 m) above mean sea level. It has two runways with asphalt surfaces: 4/22 is 6,601 by 144 feet (2,012 x 44 m) and 13/31 is 5,200 by 100 feet (1,585 x 30 m).

During calendar year 2019, the airport had 32,598 aircraft operations, an average of 89 per day: 78% general aviation, 15% air taxi, 7% military, and less than 1% scheduled commercial. In November 2021, there were 52 aircraft based at this airport: 31 single-engine, 7 multi-engine, 10 jet and 4 helicopter.

== Airline and destination ==
=== Passenger ===
American Eagle connects Texarkana Airport to Dallas/Fort Worth International Airport.

Destinations map
Destinations from Texarkana Regional Airport
(Red) = Year-round destination
(Blue) = Future destination
(Pink) = Destination being terminated

== See also ==
- Arkansas World War II Army Airfields
- List of airports in Arkansas
