= Trinity River =

Trinity River may refer to:

- Trinity River (California)
- Trinity River (Texas)
  - Trinity River Audubon Center in Texas
  - Trinity River Authority in Texas
  - Trinity River National Wildlife Refuge in Texas
  - Trinity River Project in Texas
  - Trinity River Vision Project in Texas
