= Trammell Crow Park =

Public park in Texas, United States

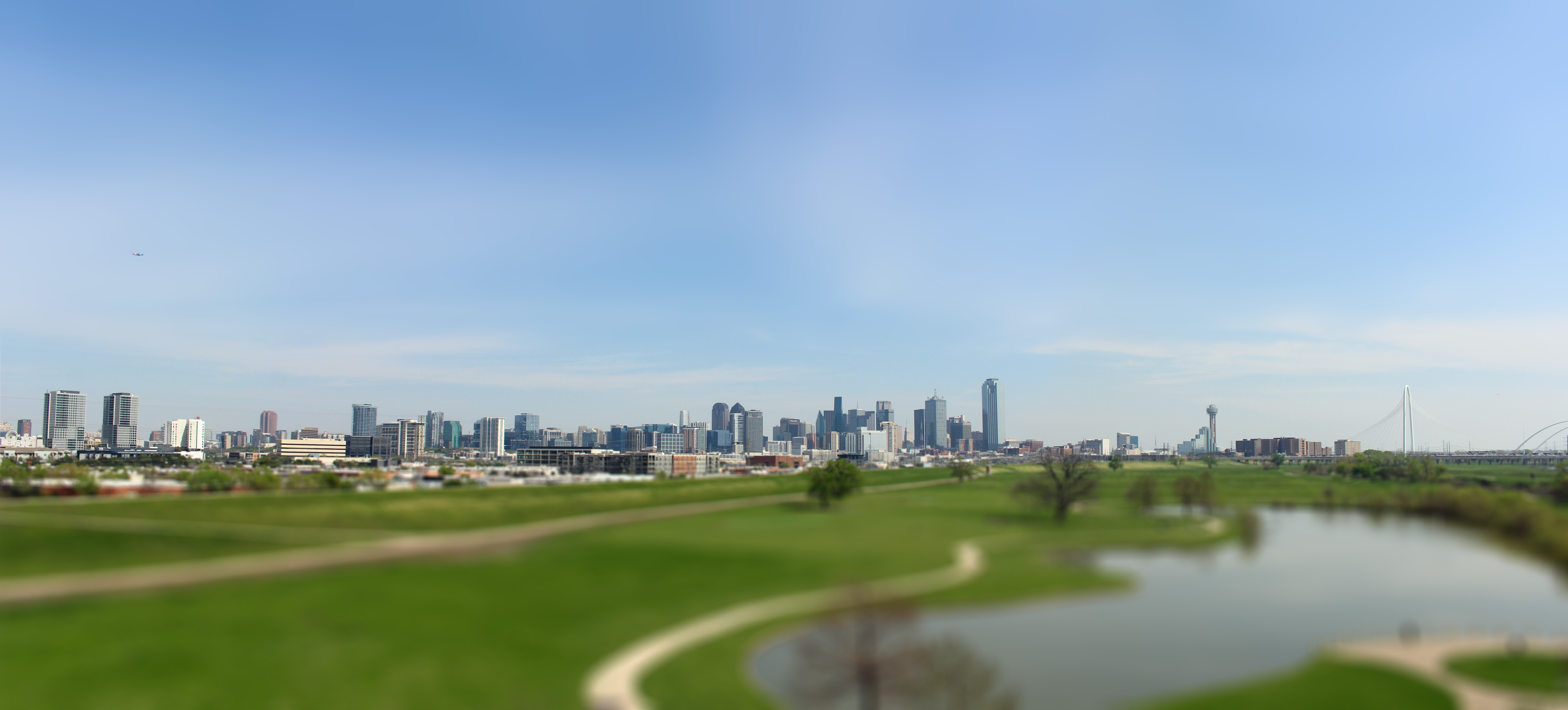
- Trammell Crow Park in 2024
- Interactive map of Trammell Crow Park
- Type: public park
- Location: Dallas, Texas
- Coordinates: 32°46′56″N 96°50′44″W
- Operator: City of Dallas
- Open: All year

Trammell Crow Park is a public park located in downtown Dallas, Texas, United States. The park spans a wide area, from the border with Irving in the west, to the downtown area to the east. The park was named for real estate developer Trammell Crow.

The Trinity River flows through the center of the park, with the West Fork, and Elm Forks entering near Irving, and numerous smaller creeks meeting the river, including Knights Branch Creek, Cedar Creek, and Coombs Creek. A number of bridges also pass over the park, notably the Margaret McDermott Bridge, Margaret Hunt Hill Bridge and the Interstate 35E.

== See also ==
- Trinity River Project
