= Trinity River Audubon Center =

Coordinates: 32.7036°N 96.7053°W

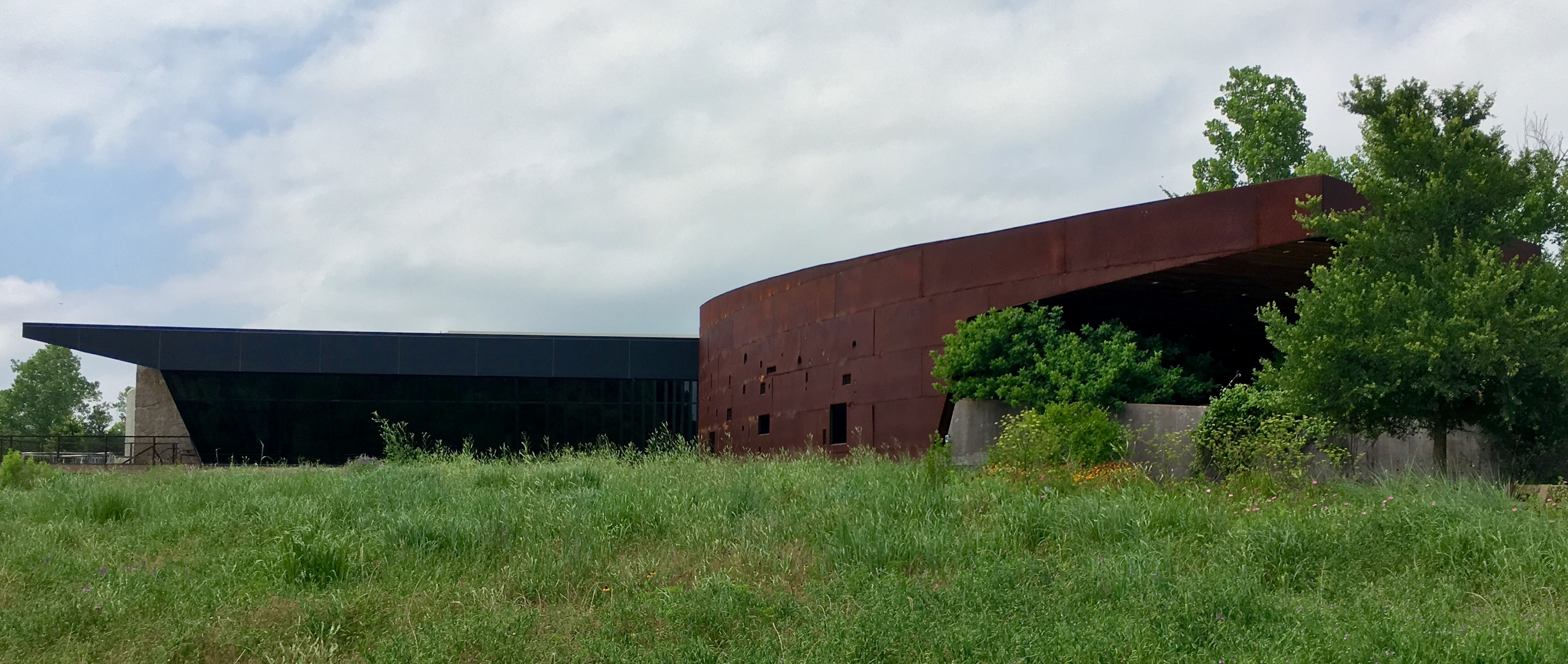
- Interactive map of the Trinity River Audubon Center area
- Alternative names: Trinity River Audubon, Trinity River Interpretive Center, TRAC

General information
- Type: Nature Center
- Location: Great Trinity Forest park, Dallas, Texas
- Current tenants: National Audubon Society
- Construction started: 2002
- Completed: 2008

Design and construction
- Architects: Antoine Predock; BRW Architects

Website
- http://trinityriver.audubon.org/

The Trinity River Audubon Center is a nature center in the Great Trinity Forest, a large urban open space park in Southeast Dallas, Texas.

== History ==
The center was completed in 2008 on the site of a former illegal landfill called Deepwood. Federal Judge Barefoot Sanders resolved a lawsuit by issuing an order resulting in the creation of a nature center on the site. Prior to becoming an illegal dump, the site was a farm and then a gravel mine.

The center was designed by Antoine Predock and BRW Architects. It is the first LEED-certified building constructed by the Parks and Recreation Department of Dallas and includes a green roof (planted), rainwater collection system, energy efficient systems, and recycled materials.

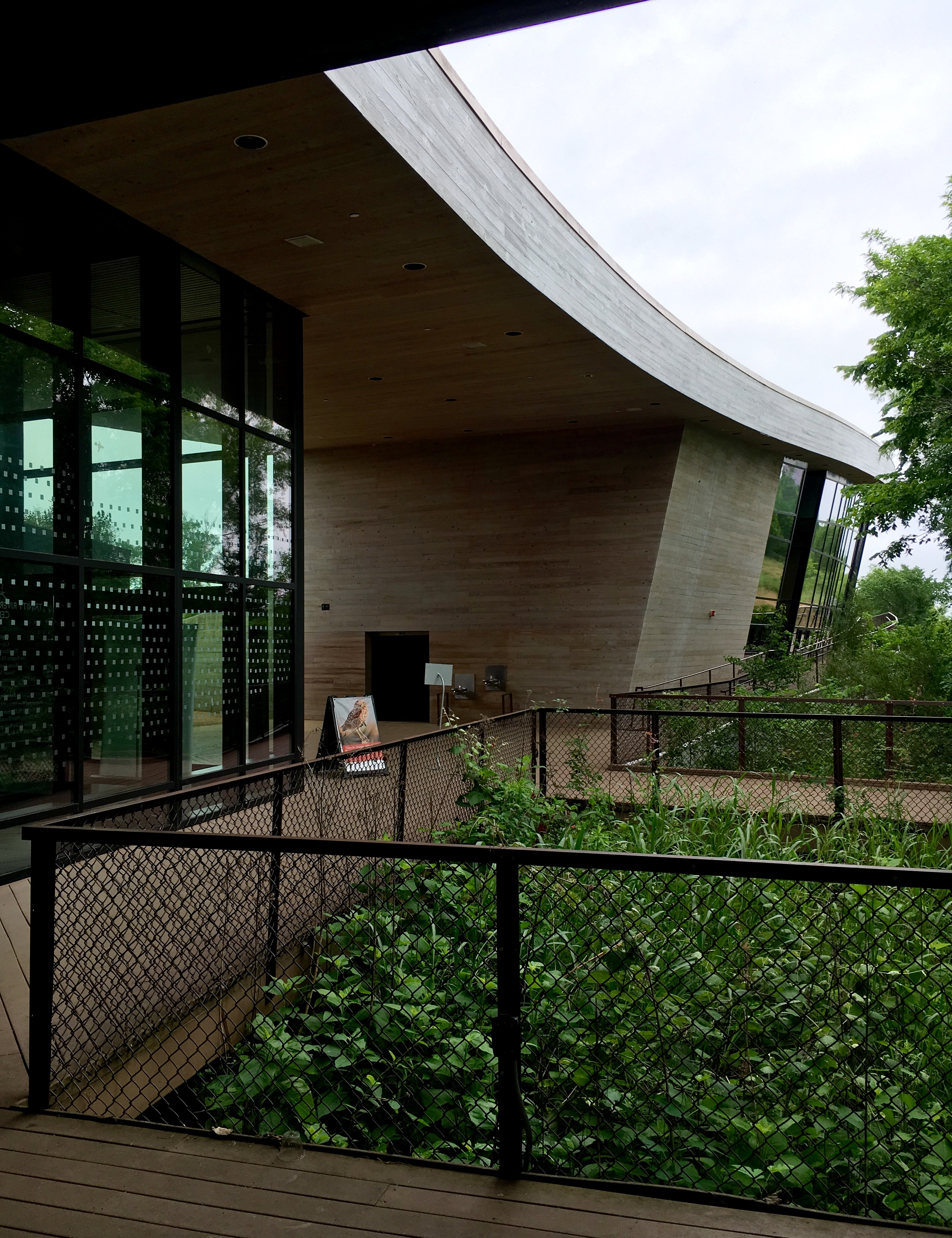

== Nature ==
The National Audubon Society has a natural history museum and nature center in the building and its surroundings.

The Great Trinity Forest urban park is located within the Texas Blackland Prairies ecoregion. Habitats within it include bottomland hardwood forests, riparian zones, wetlands, open water ponds, grasslands, and the Trinity River itself.

The center is part of the City of Dallas-Trinity River Corridor Project and consists of 120 acres. The center features five miles of nature viewing trails, a butterfly garden, outdoor picnic areas, an indoor event center, and several rentable conference rooms. The center also hosts community events, such as the annual farm-to-table outdoor dinner, Songbird Supper.

== Trinity River Project ==
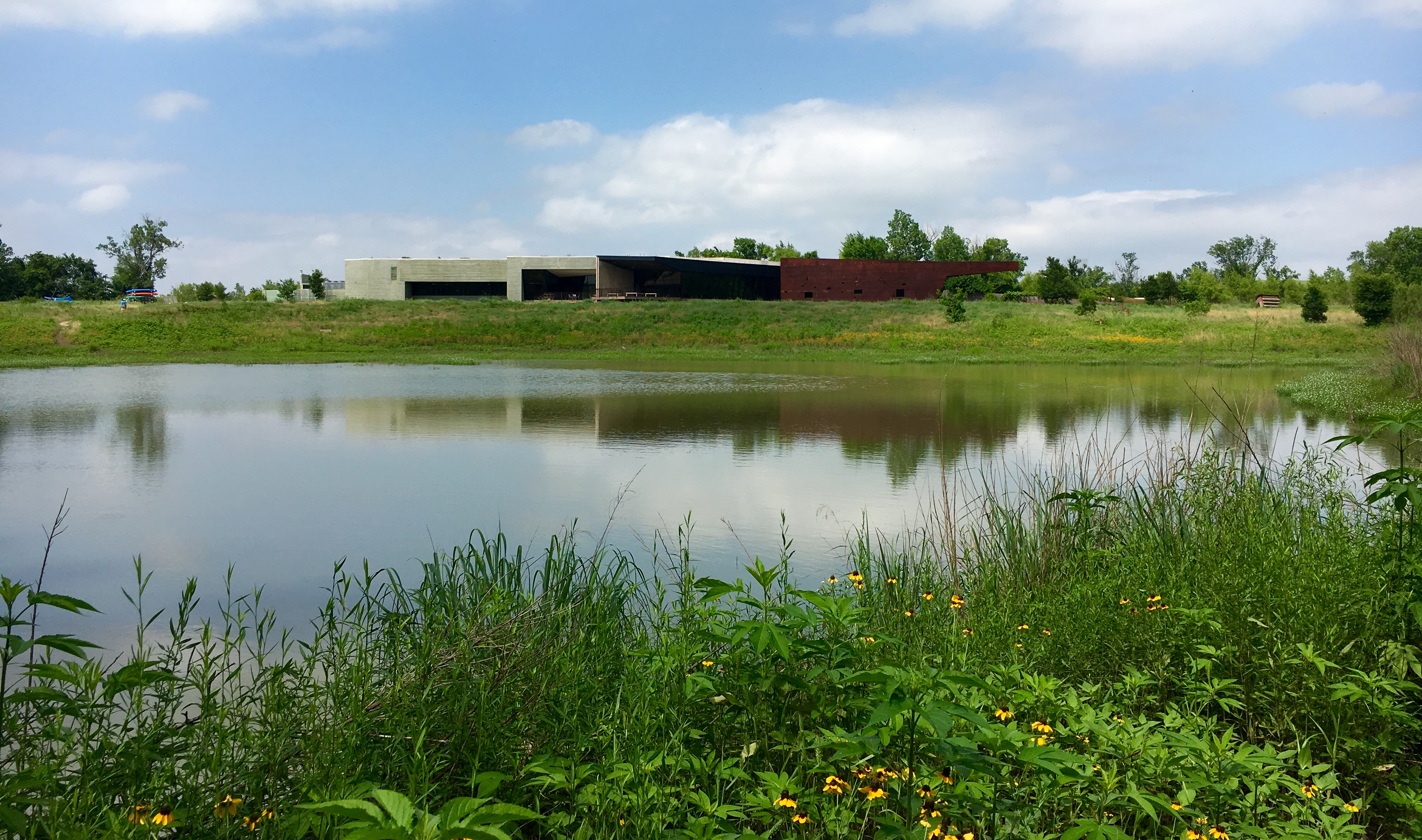
Trinity River Audubon Center viewed across adjacent pond

The center is part of the Trinity River Project, a public works project to redevelop the Trinity River in Dallas. The Trinity River Project includes other recreational amenities. There are other trails and parks along the Trinity River channel, including the Continental Avenue Bridge and the AT&T Trail. Connecting the Trinity River Audubon Center to a trailhead at Elam Road, the AT&T Trail is approximately 4.25 miles long.

== See also ==
- National Audubon Society
- Parks in Dallas, Texas
- Trinity River-related articles
