= Memorial Stadium (University of Minnesota) =

Stadium of University of Minnesota

- "The Brick House"
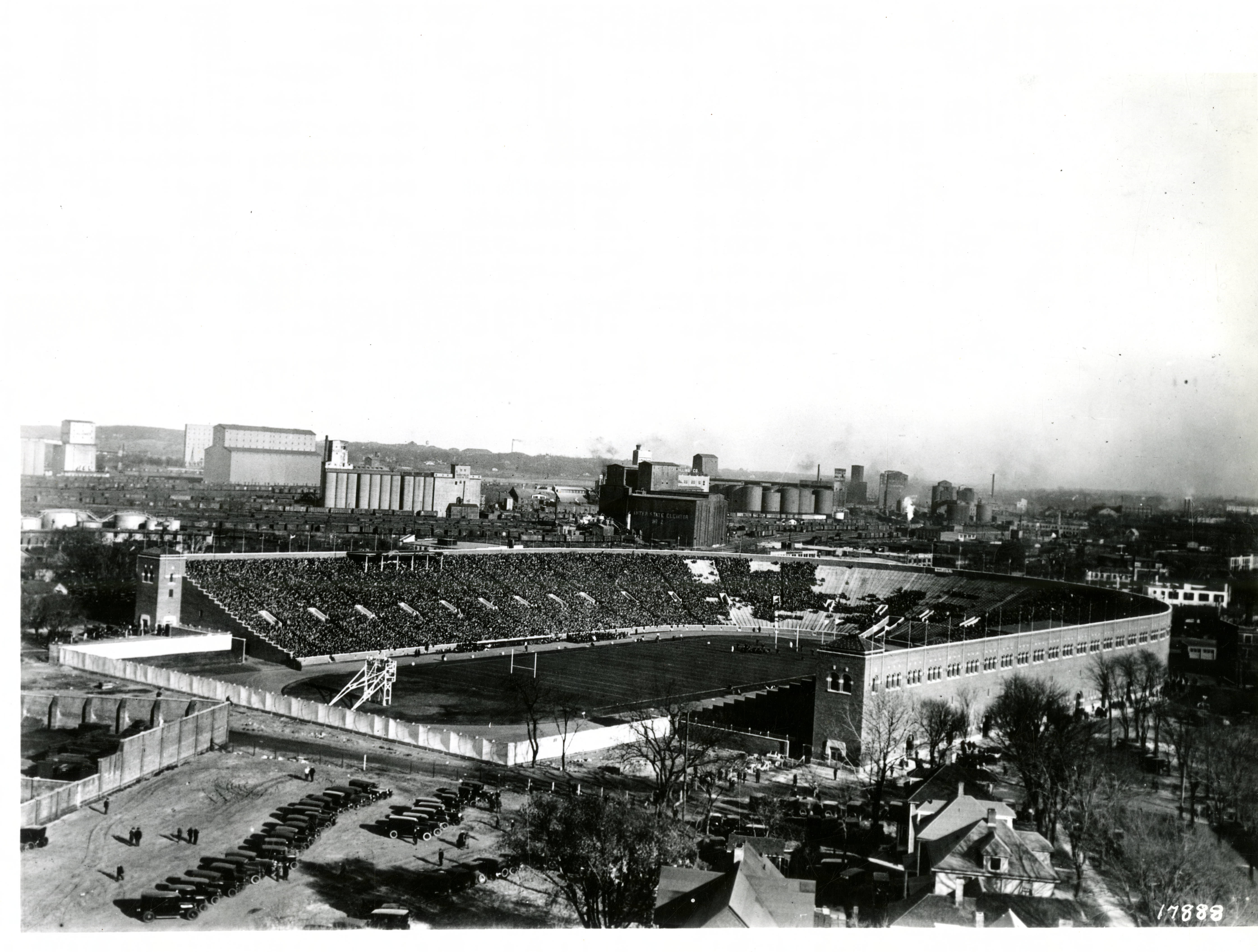
- Stadium in 1926

- Location in the United States Location in Minnesota
- Interactive map of Memorial Stadium
- Address: University Ave SE
- Location: University of Minnesota; Minneapolis, Minnesota, U.S.
- Coordinates: 44.975535°N 93.229192°W
- Owner: University of Minnesota
- Operator: University of Minnesota
- Capacity: 56,652 (1970–81); 52,809 (1924–69)
- Surface: Natural grass (1977–1981); Tartan Turf (1970–1976); Natural grass (1924–1969)

Construction
- Groundbreaking: March 6, 1924
- Opened: October 4, 1924
- Closed: November 21, 1981
- Demolished: 1992; 34 years ago

Tenant
- Minnesota Golden Gophers (NCAA) (1924–1981)

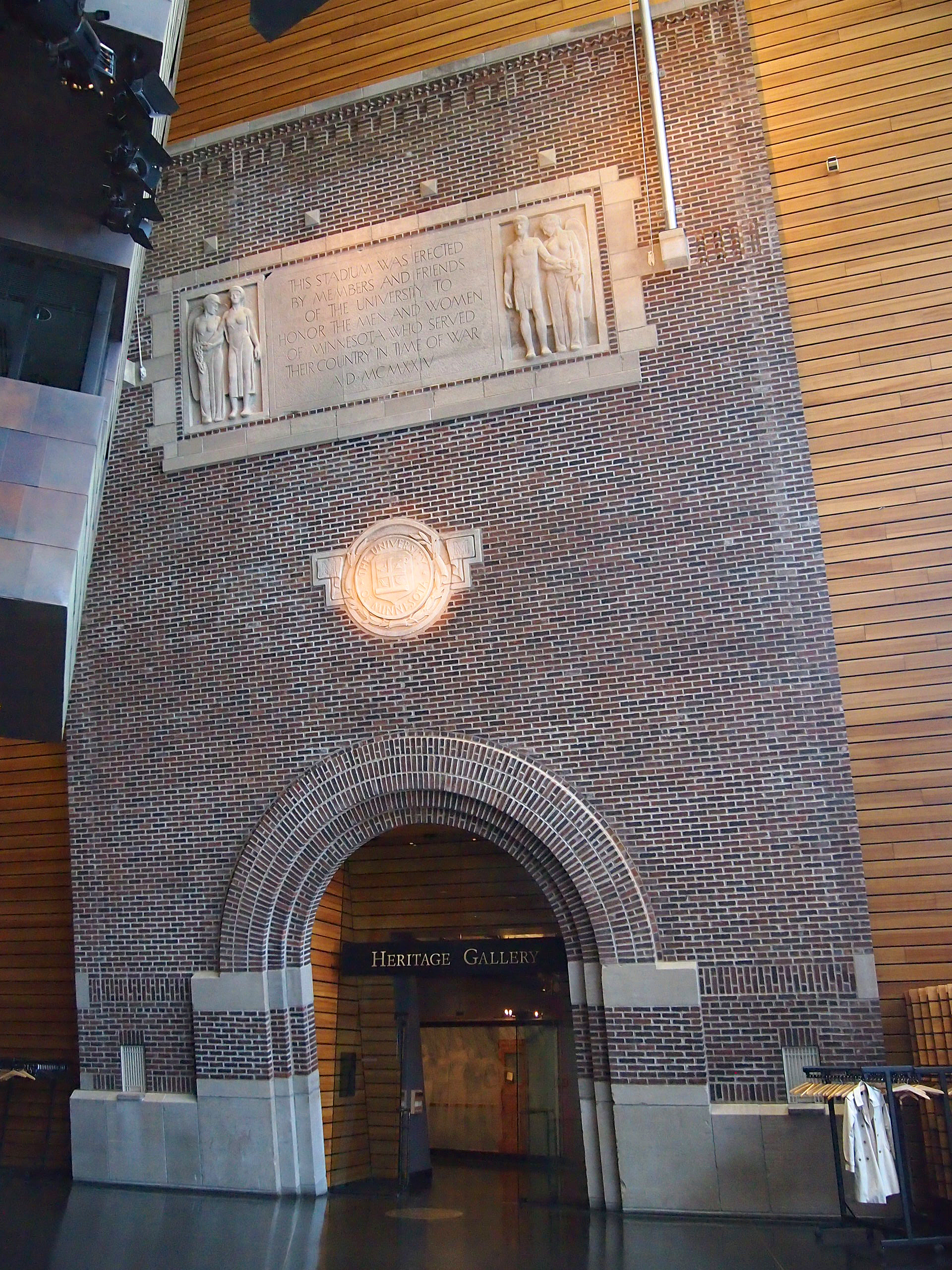
Original entrance, now inside the McNamara Alumni Center

Memorial Stadium, also known as the "Brick House", was an outdoor athletic stadium in the north central United States, located on the campus of the University of Minnesota in Minneapolis. It was the home of the Minnesota Golden Gophers football team for 58 seasons, from 1924 through 1981. Prior to 1924, the Gophers played at Northrop Field.

Starting in 1982, the Gophers played their home games in the new Hubert H. Humphrey Metrodome, and Memorial Stadium was demolished a decade later. After 27 seasons indoors, the Gophers returned to campus in 2009 at the new Huntington Bank Stadium, a block from the site of Memorial Stadium.

== History ==
Opened 102 years ago on October 14, 1924, the stadium was dedicated to the 3,527 students, graduates, and workers who served in World War I, which had ended six years earlier. It sat on approximately eleven acres (4.5 ha).

While Memorial Stadium was its home, the football team won six national championships, including three consecutive (1934–1936). The championship years were 1934, 1935, 1936, 1940, 1941, and 1960. The official capacity of the stadium during the 1970s was listed as 56,652. From the 1940s onward, temporary bleachers were occasionally brought in to boost capacity to approximately 66,000, though many of the seats were far away from the field. The stadium's attendance record was 66,284, set in 1961 against Purdue on November 18.

Memorial Stadium also served as the university's track and field venue, and was an occasional back-up venue for professional football and soccer. In 1969, the NFL's Minnesota Vikings played a regular season game on October 5 against the Green Bay Packers at Memorial Stadium. It was due to a conflict with a Minnesota Twins playoff game at Metropolitan Stadium, game three of the 1969 American League Championship Series the following day. The Vikings also played a pre-season game at Memorial in 1971, its second season with artificial turf. The artificial Tartan Turf was removed after seven seasons and returned to natural grass in 1977.

The Minnesota Kicks soccer team of the NASL played once at Memorial Stadium, a 1981 playoff game on September 6 against the Fort Lauderdale Strikers and lost 3–0. The game was moved due to a schedule conflict with the Twins at Met Stadium. It was the last game in Kicks' history.

Ancel Keys founded the Laboratory of Physiological Hygiene underneath Memorial Stadium, on the ground floor accessed at Gate 27. Here thirty-six conscientious objectors were confined during the yearlong Minnesota Starvation Experiment.

Memorial Stadium served as the anchor for Stadium Village, a small commercial area at the southeast portion of the Twin Cities campus.

== Move to Metrodome 1982 ==
Pressured by downtown Minneapolis business interests and athletic boosters, the school elected to move out of the stadium to the new Metrodome, about two miles (3 km) away, during the spring of 1982. Athletic director Paul Giel cited the advantages of recruiting by playing in a new NFL venue. Also, the attendance was expected to go up in the late fall with protection from harsh weather.

Memorial Stadium had been neglected by that time, and was badly in need of renovation. New head coach Lou Holtz gave an impassioned speech when the time came in 1984 to decide whether to remain at the Metrodome, and declared that "Athletes want to play at the Dome."

== University Aquatic center ==
Following the move, the University of Minnesota proposed a new natatorium that would extend into the field at the open end of the horseshoe and ensure that there could be no return to Memorial Stadium. After legal challenges to halt construction of the natatorium failed, the Aquatic Center opened in 1990 and the stadium was torn down two years later. The original brick entrance arch was preserved, and when the McNamara Alumni Center was built on the same site it was installed in the interior atrium over the entrance to a small museum.

== Aftermath ==
The move to the Metrodome proved to be a dismal failure in the long run, as Gophers home games lost the charm of being on a college campus. The Gophers had the lowest priority in scheduling, behind the Twins and Vikings, and had to move games if the Twins were in the baseball playoffs. The university also gave up most concession and parking revenue, although their portion of the rent was the lowest of the three Metrodome tenants.

On May 20, 2006, the state legislature passed a bill providing funding for a new on-campus stadium. It opened in the fall of 2009 as TCF Bank Stadium. The original Memorial Stadium site could not be used, due to the construction of the aquatic and alumni centers. The new stadium is located about a block from where the old stadium once stood and was designed so that the alumni center on the old site is visible through the open end of the horseshoe.

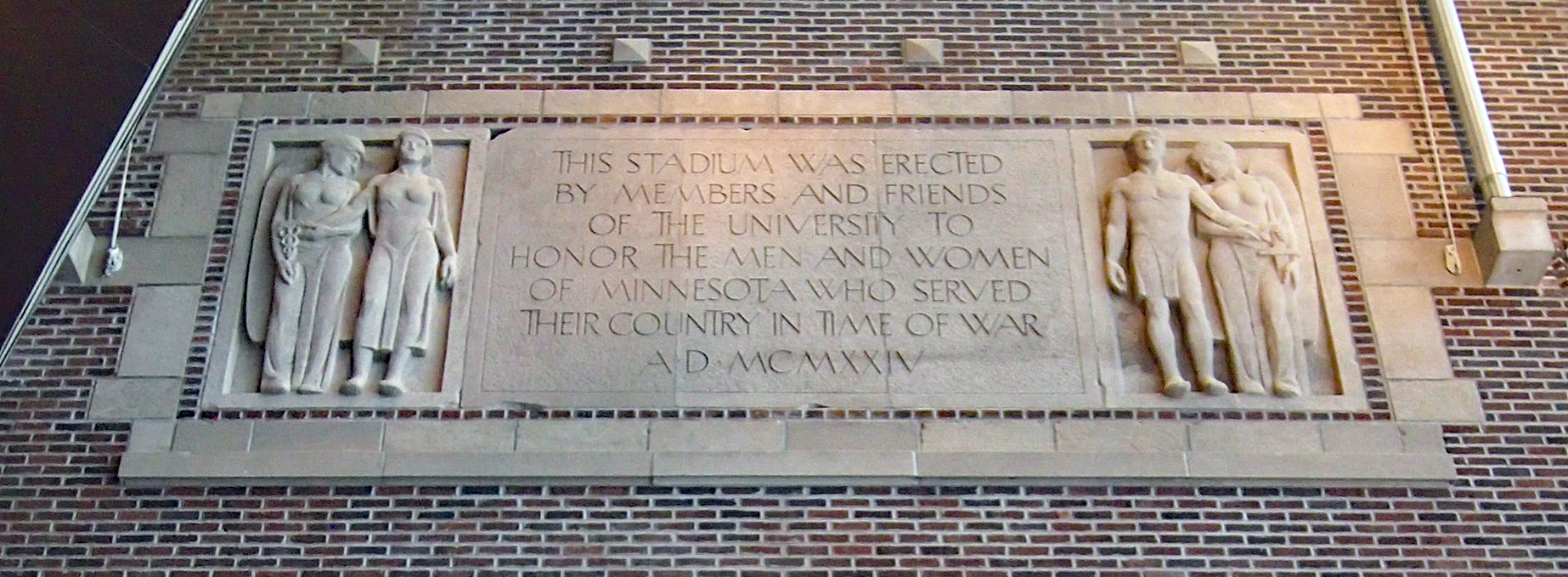
Dedication above the main entryway

== Attendance ==
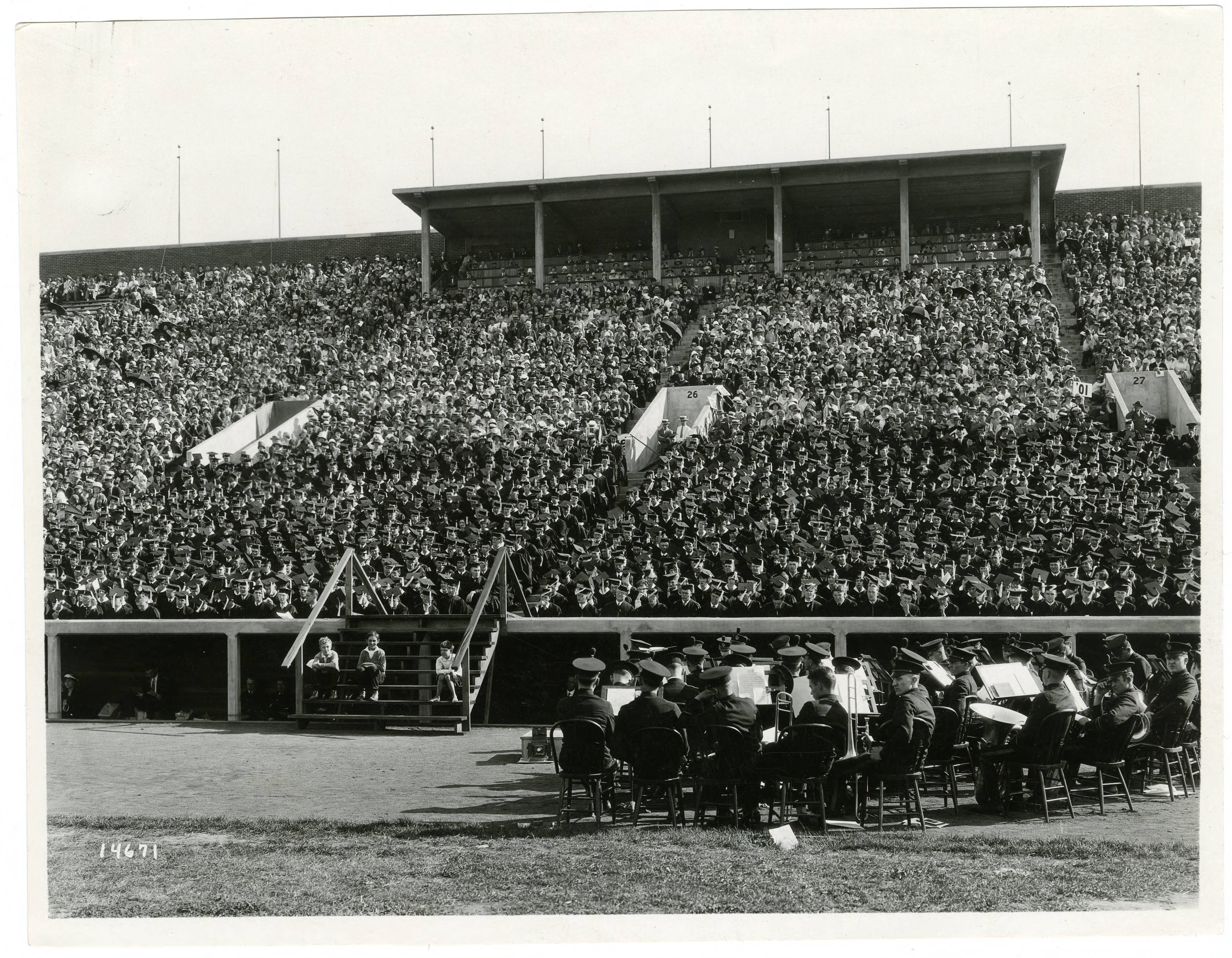
Stadium grandstand in 1925

Year	Total	Games	Season highest	Average
1924	139,772	6	Illinois (35,341)	23,297
1925	193,707	7	Notre Dame (49,009)	27,672
1926	156,032	5	Michigan (58,362)	31,206
1927	166,848	5	Wisconsin (48,443)	23,126
1928	146,185	5	Chicago (53,016)	29,237
1929	204,083	6	Michigan (58,160)	34,014
1930	167,728	6	Northwestern (50,225)	27,955
1931	115,631	5	Wisconsin (48,443)	23,126
1932	113,956	5	Northwestern (52,426)	43,557
1933	164,301	6	Iowa (41,177)	27,384
1934	192,922	5	Michigan (59,362)	38,584
1935	217,785	5	Northwestern (52,426)	43,557
1936	247,653	5	Iowa (61,172)	49,531
1937	254,188	5	Notre Dame (63,237)	50,838
1938	237,000	5	Michigan (54,212)	47,400
1939	229,954	5	Northwestern (52,372)	45,991
1940	234,990	5	Michigan (61,976)	46,998
1941	239,227	5	Northwestern (61,784)	47,845
1942	231,307	6	Michigan (52,351)	38,551
1943	182,779	7	Purdue (38,709)	26,111
1944	179,979	6	Northwestern (39,997)	29,997
1945	246,931	6	Ohio State (55,789)	41,155
1946	328,003	6	Michigan (59,037)	54,667
1947	289,612	5	Purdue (61,087)	57,922
1948	308,556	5	Purdue (65,549)	61,711
1949	305,200	5	Wisconsin (63,139)	61,040
1950	267,015	5	Iowa (60,312)	53,403
1951	224,759	5	Nebraska (54,573)	45,152
1952	270,292	5	Iowa (60,376)	54,058
1953	293,313	5	Michigan (62,795)	58,663
1954	347,555	6	Iowa (65,464)	57,926
1955	305,581	5	USC (64,074)	61,116
1956	372,654	6	Iowa (64,235)	62,109
1957	314,769	5	Purdue (64,629)	62,954
1958	282,230	5	Iowa (63,726)	56,446
1959	256,039	5	Michigan (56,082)	51,208
1960	342,199	6	Iowa (65,292)	57,033
1961	361,929	6	Purdue (66,284)	60,322
1962	368,200	6	Iowa (65,061)	61,367
1963	286,797	5	Michigan (61,817)	57,759
1964	268,908	5	Iowa (62,514)	53,782
1965	302,747	6	Michigan (58,519)	50,458
1966	248,248	5	Iowa (62,631)	49,600
1967	237,798	6	Michigan State (56,334)	39,633
1968	312,806	6	USC (60,820)	52,134
1969	272,449	6	Ohio State (52,972)	45,417
1970	225,468	5	Nebraska (52,539)	45,093
1971	207,662	6	Michigan (44,412)	34,610
1972	222,079	6	Iowa (44,196)	37,013
1973	252,917	6	Nebraska (56,782)	42,153
1974	226,127	6	Ohio State (45,411)	37,688
1975	220,081	7	Wisconsin (37,578)	31,440
1976	262,878	6	Iowa (53,222)	43,813
1977	247,118	7	Michigan (44,165)	35,303
1978	231,411	6	Ohio State (52,209)	38,569
1979	241,952	6	Purdue (47,281)	40,325
1980	265,105	6	Iowa (58,158)	44,184
1981	301,248	7	Michigan (52,875)	43,035

Events and tenants
Preceded by Northrop Field	Host of the Minnesota Gophers; 1924 – 1981	Succeeded by Hubert H. Humphrey Metrodome
