= Ronald Kirk Bridge =

Ronald Kirk Pedestrian Bridge
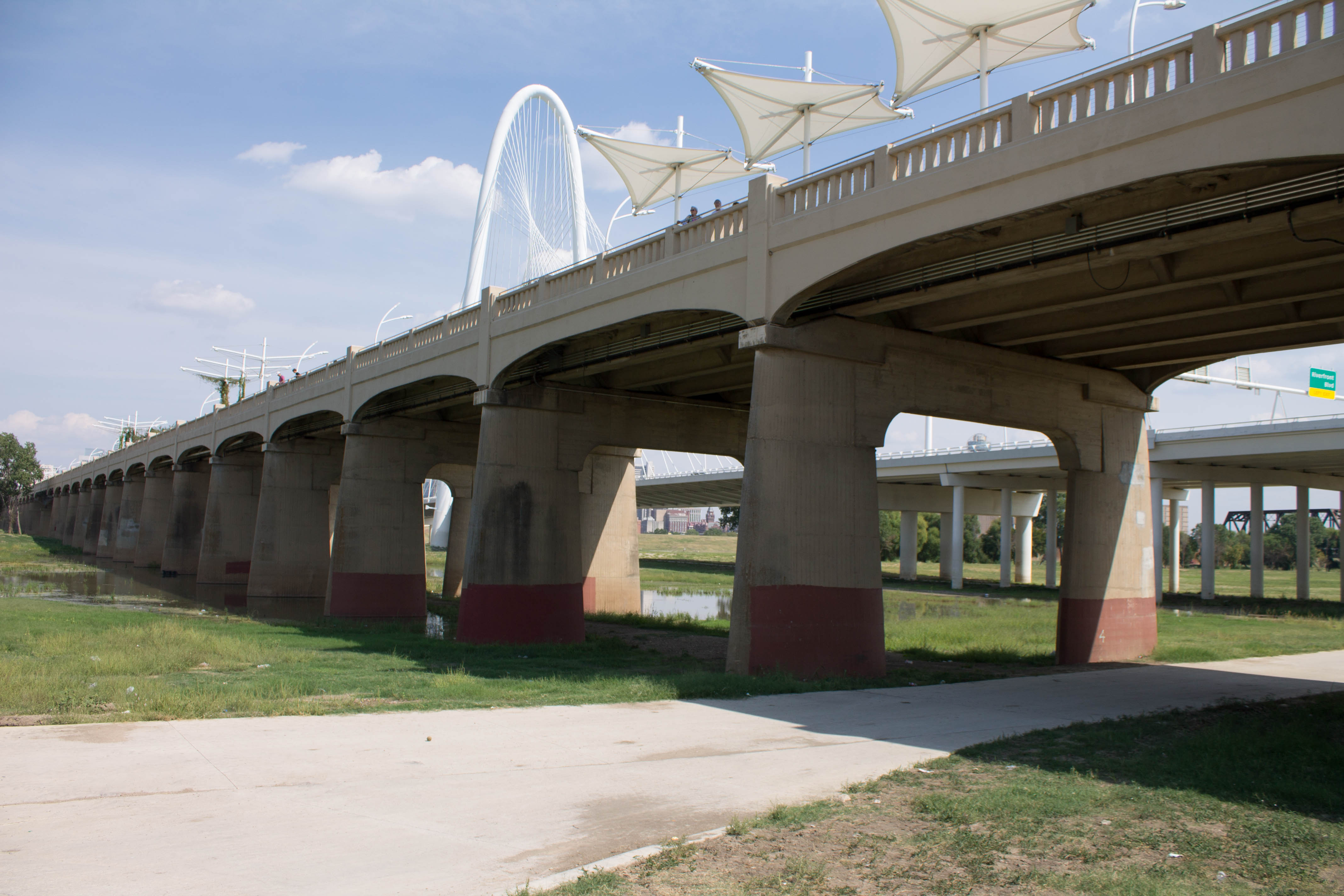
- Ronald Kirk Bridge in 2015
- Coordinates: 32°46′51″N 96°49′22″W
- Carries: Pedestrians (since June 15, 2014)
- Crosses: Trinity River
- Locale: Continental Avenue in Dallas, Texas
- Official name: Ronald Kirk Bridge
- Other name(s): Lamar-McKinney Viaduct, Continental Avenue Bridge
- Named for: Ron Kirk
- Owner: City of Dallas

Characteristics
- Design: Multi-span plate girder bridge
- Material: Concrete, steel
- Total length: 2,105 feet (642 m)
- Width: 60 feet (18 m)
- No. of spans: 43

History
- Designer: Francis Dey Hughes
- Constructed by: L. H. Lay Company
- Construction start: 1929
- Construction end: 1930
- Opened: 1932
- Closed: 2013 (vehicular)
- Replaced by: Margaret Hunt Hill Bridge (vehicular)
- Lamar-McKinney Bridge
- U.S. National Register of Historic Places
- Area: 3 acres (1.2 ha)
- MPS: Historic Road Infrastructure of Texas, 1866-1965
- NRHP reference No.: 15000708
- Added to NRHP: October 5, 2015

Location
- Interactive map of Ronald Kirk Pedestrian Bridge

The Ronald Kirk Bridge is a pedestrian bridge over the Trinity River in Dallas, Texas. It connects Downtown Dallas and West Dallas, paralleling the 2012 Margaret Hunt Hill Bridge for vehicles, and the 1930 Texas and Pacific Railway Trinity River Bridge.

== History ==
Constructed as the Lamar-McKinney Viaduct in 1933, the original road bridge was built to carry vehicles across the periodically swelling Trinity River to West Dallas. It was completed 27 years after the river's 1908 flood that submerged most of the area.

The bridge was renamed the Ronald Kirk Bridge in 2016 from its former name, the Continental Avenue Bridge. It was renamed in honor of the first African-American mayor of Dallas, Ronald Kirk.

=== Restoration ===
The bridge had fallen into a state of disrepair by 2010, when plans were being developed to reconstruct Continental Avenue and the bridge. During the reconstruction of the bridge it was decided that there was no need for it to carry vehicular traffic, since the nearby Margaret Hunt Hill Bridge was completed in 2012 to do so. The design as a footbridge complemented the nearby open park plan for Klyde Warren Park, as a recreation amenity.

The Ronald Kirk Bridge reopened on Sunday, June 15, 2014 (Father's Day). It opened with a playground, a splash park, lounge chairs, human-sized chess boards, and a ceiling of cloth to shade the area, along with many trails surrounding the bridge in the Trinity River Basin and on the levees.

This bridge is part of the greater Trinity River Project.

== See also ==
- List of bridges on the National Register of Historic Places in Texas
- List of bridges documented by the Historic American Engineering Record in Texas
- National Register of Historic Places listings in Dallas County, Texas
