= Mesa Public Library =

Branch Library in Los Alamos, New Mexico, United States

Coordinates: 35°52′59″N 106°18′14″W

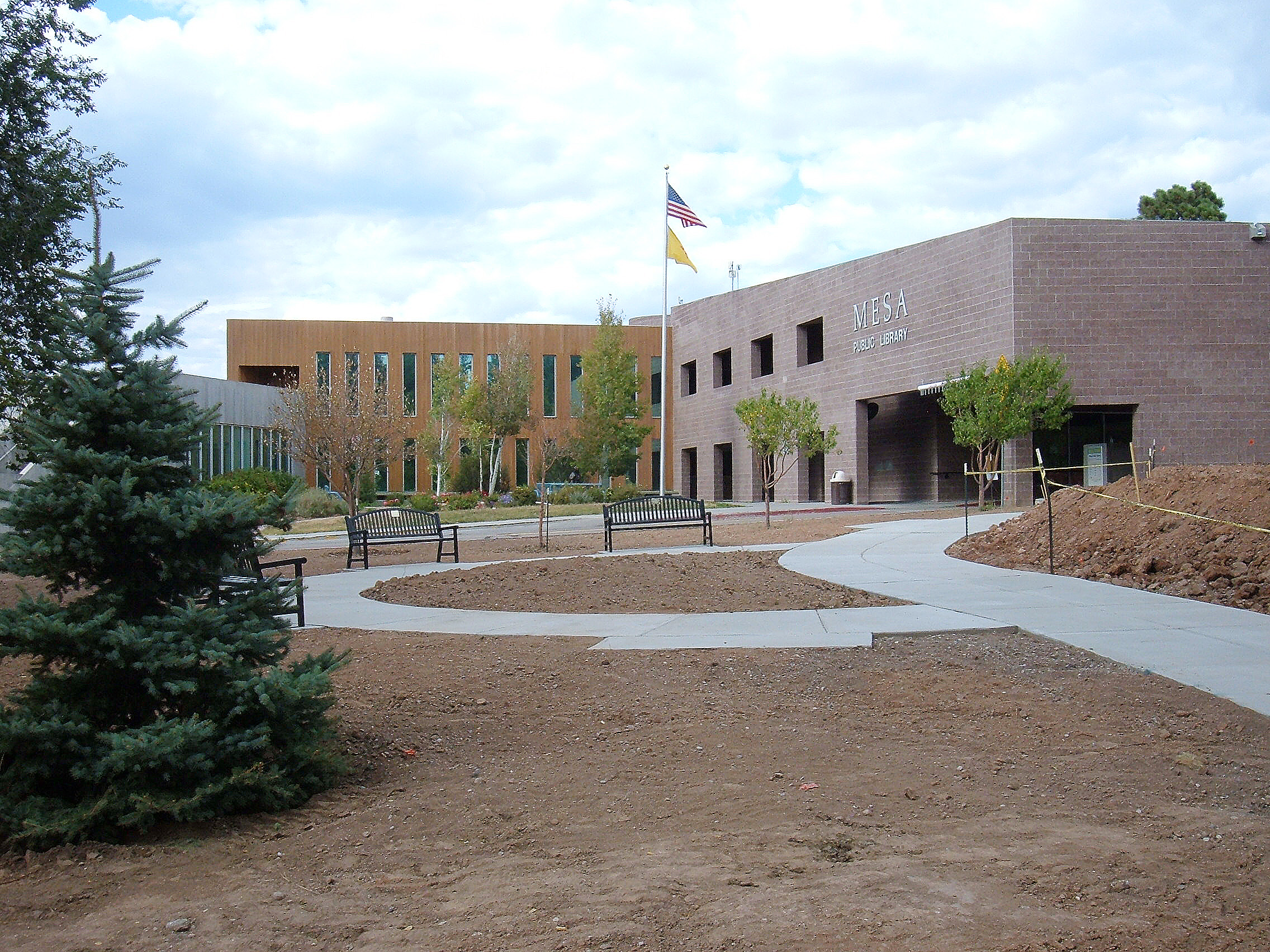
- Location: 2400 Central Avenue NE; Los Alamos, New Mexico 87544; United States
- Established: 1943

Collection
- Size: 160,000 (2015)

Access and use
- Circulation: 152,692 (2008)
- Population served: 19,022

Other information
- Website: Mesa Public Library

Mesa Public Library is the Los Alamos branch of the Los Alamos County Library System in New Mexico, United States. The library collection has more than 160,000 items which include books, CDs, DVDs, original paintings, and material in several foreign languages. The Southwest Collection contains over 3,400 fiction and nonfiction books about New Mexico and Arizona.

Layout & Amenities: Includes a raised garden bed and public art outside, community bulletin boards and outlet-equipped high tables in the lobby, a central "wedge" seating area and study carrels, and an upper-level rotunda with comfortable seating.

Friends of the Library Bookstore: Located on-site, open Monday–Thursday from 10:00 AM – 6:00 PM, Friday from 10:00 AM – 5:00 PM, and Saturday from 10:00 AM – 4:00 PM.

== History ==
The library started in 1943 as a subscription library, after the donation of $5 by 70 families living in Los Alamos. In 1945 it became free and open to all. In 1985 a branch library opened in White Rock. In 1994 the Los Alamos branch moved into a building designed by architect Antoine Predock and located west of Fuller Lodge.

In 2015, the White Rock branch moved into a new building next to the White Rock Youth Activity Center.

== Branches ==
There are two locations:

- Mesa Public Library (2400 Central Avenue, Los Alamos)
- White Rock Branch Library (10 Sherwood Boulevard, White Rock)
