= McNamara Alumni Center =

Coordinates: 44.975106°N 93.227741°W

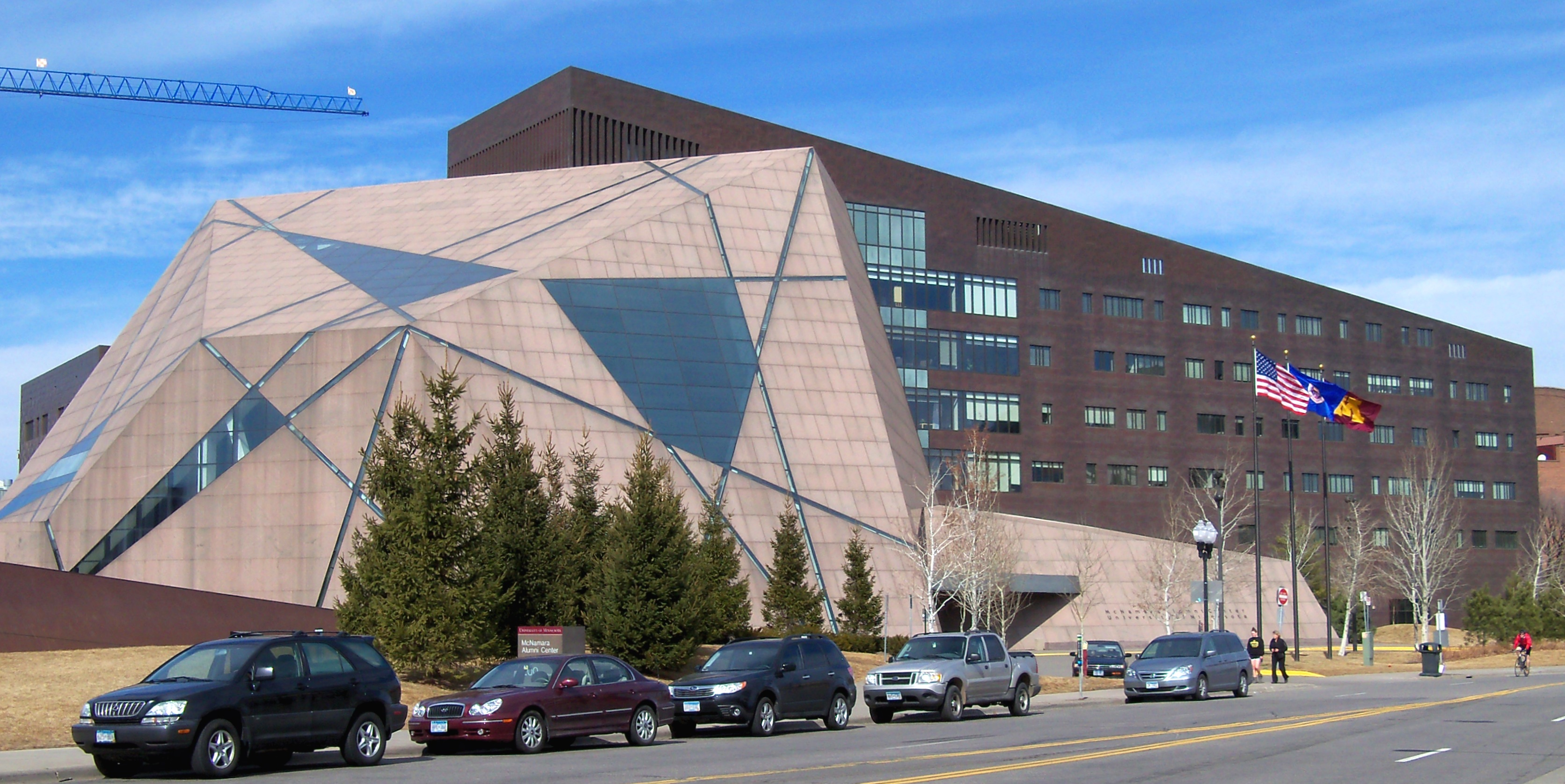
The McNamara Center in 2012

The McNamara Alumni Center is located at the University of Minnesota's Twin Cities campus in Minneapolis, Minnesota. Designed by Antoine Predock, it is one of the more architecturally striking buildings in the Twin Cities. The building, opened in 2000, contains two main components: University office space and ten meeting rooms for University and public use. The University owns the land, but the University of Minnesota Gateway Corporation, consisting of the U of M Foundation and U of M Alumni Association, owns the structure.

== Overview ==
Located at the intersection of University Avenue and Oak Street SE (200 SE Oak St, Minneapolis, MN 55414), the landmark building occupies land formerly home to Memorial Stadium and its interior features an arch that was once an entrance to the stadium. The building opened in February 2000 and is named for Richard "Pinky" McNamara, a 1956 alumnus of the university and former Gopher football player.

Architect Antoine Predock was chosen in 1996 to design the structure. KKE Architects of Minneapolis served as the project's executive architect and general manager. About 75,000 square feet (7,000 m^{2}) of copper clads the rectangular portion where university offices are located, including those of the University of Minnesota Alumni Association. Granite supported by 500 steel beams forms an asymmetrical geode-styled area of the building featuring an interior public Memorial Hall, 85-foot (26 m) tall. Some 2,200 rose-colored granite blocks weighing up to 1,000 pounds (450 kg) each form the geode's exterior. The structure required 40,000 square feet (3,700 m^{2}) of granite.
