= Flint RiverQuarium =

Aquarium in Albany, Georgia, U.S.

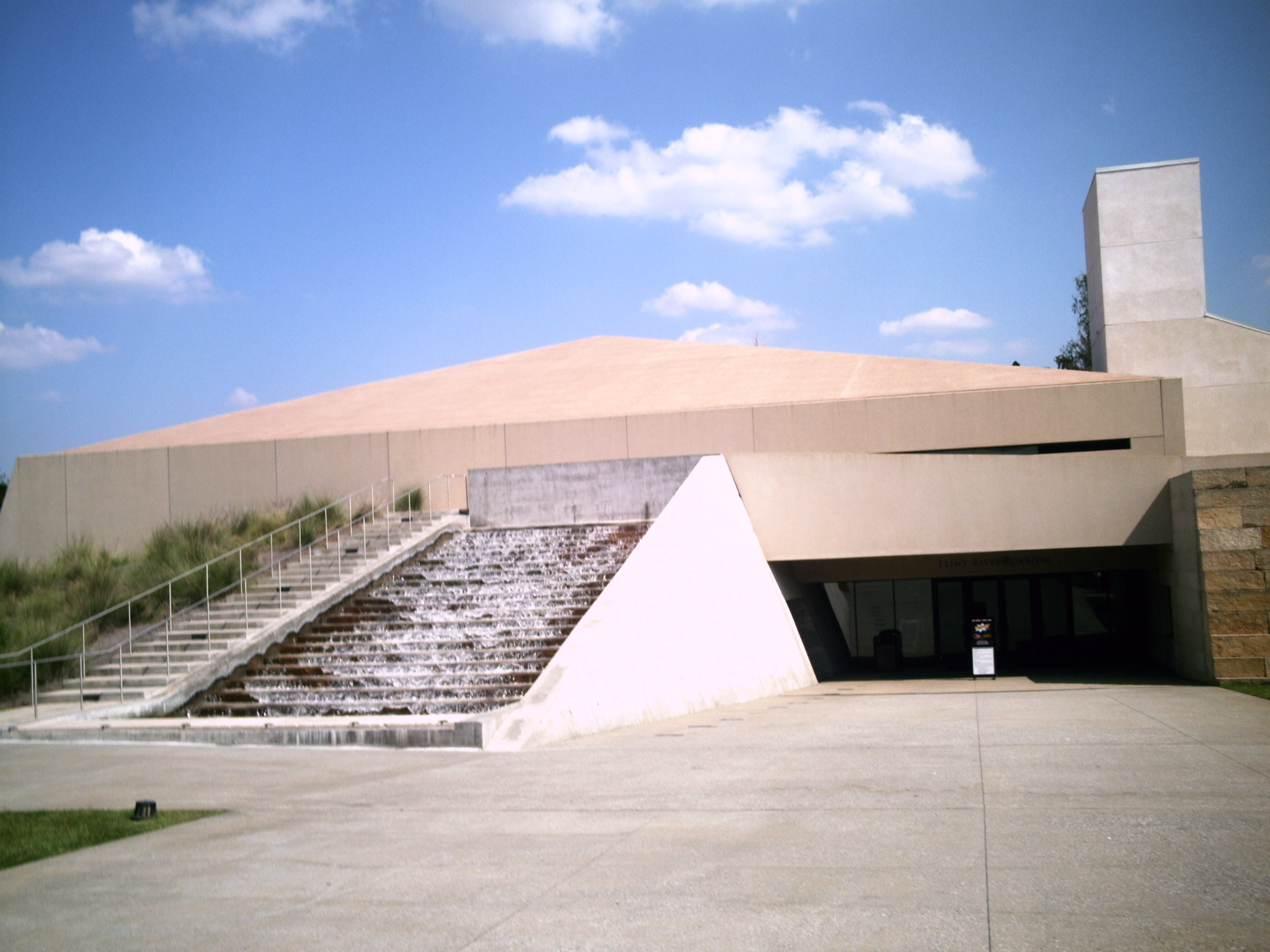
- Entrance to the RiverQuarium
- Interactive map of Flint RiverQuarium
- 31.57891°N 84.149255°W
- Date opened: 2004
- Location: Albany, Georgia
- Land area: 35,000 sq ft (3,300 m^{2}) indoors and 19,000 sq ft (1,800 m^{2}) outdoors
- No. of species: >100
- Volume of largest tank: 175,000-US-gallon (660,000 L)
- Website: www.flintriverquarium.com

The Flint RiverQuarium is a 54,000 sq ft (5,000 m^{2}) aquarium opened in 2004 and located on the banks of the Flint River in Albany, Georgia, United States.

The aquarium follows the journey of the Flint River, and highlights the ecosystems of the Apalachicola, Chattahoochee and Flint River basins.

== Features ==
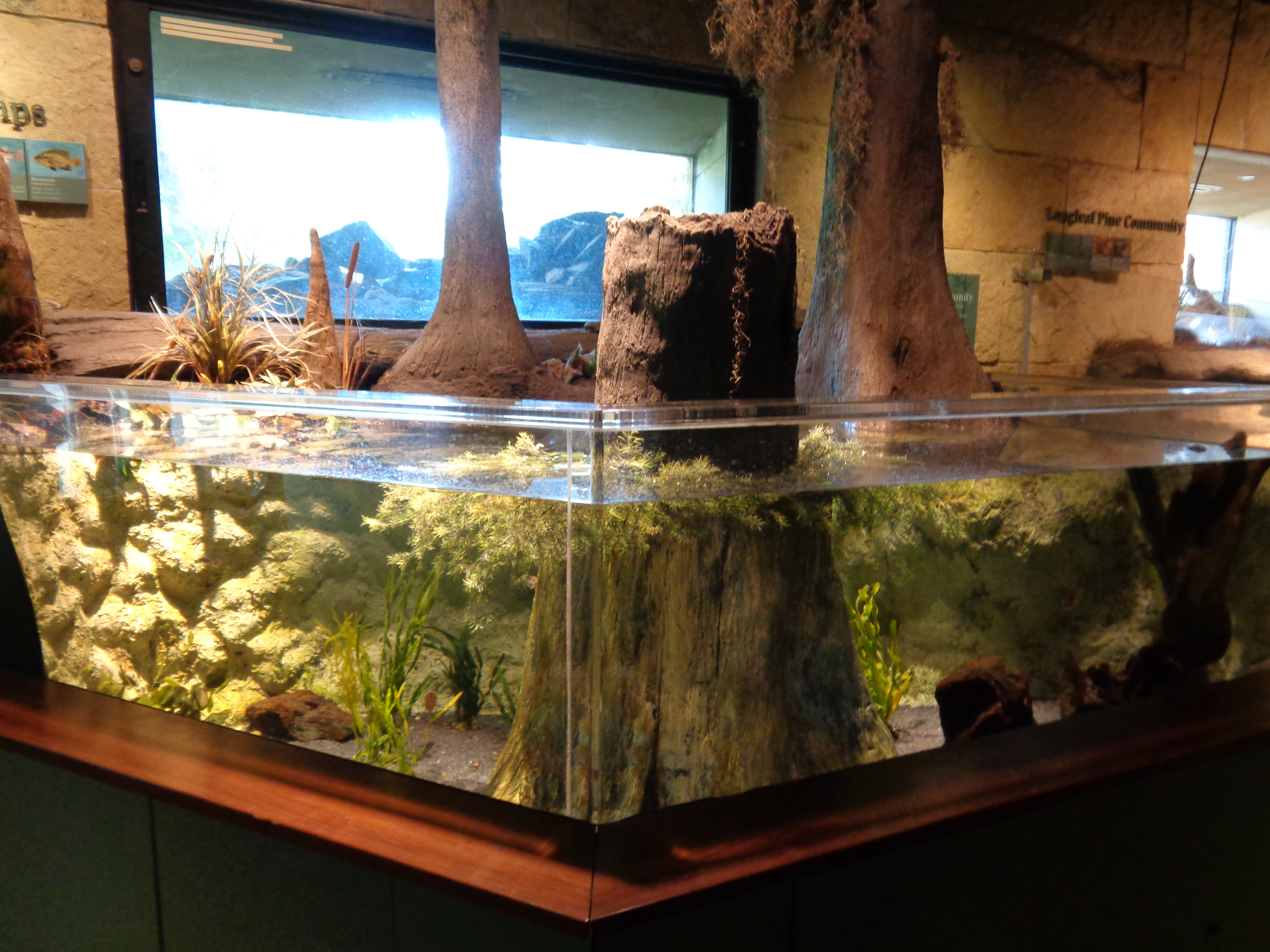
One of the exhibits inside the aquarium.

The Flint RiverQuarium features both freshwater and saltwater river ecosystem of Southwest Georgia as well as the world.

Blue Hole Spring is an open-air, 175,000-US-gallon (660,000 L), 22 ft (6.7 m) deep tank filled by a natural spring below. It exhibits the diverse life forms of the Flint River, which runs through Southwest Georgia.

The Flint River Gallery includes both freshwater and saltwater fish, and includes a live fish hatchery. In this exhibit, visitors can follow the 350-mile (560 km) journey of the Flint River to the ocean.

Discovery Caverns includes interactive displays and a cave exhibiting subterranean creatures.

The World of Water shows visitors other rivers around the world that share features and challenges with the Flint.

Spring Run Creek is home to the aquarium's alligators.

Cypress Pond Aviary is a 35-foot (11 m) high enclosure featuring birds indigenous to the Flint River basin, as well as several migratory birds that pass through the area. Although the first inhabitants of this exhibit are commercially available birds such as quail and ducks, the RiverQuarium is working with various groups to obtain non-releasable birds native to the area.

The Adventure Center is across the plaza from the RiverQuarium, and is designed to house traveling exhibits at the Aquarium.

== Architecture ==
The RiverQuarium was designed by architect Antoine Predock in association with Executive Architect Robbins Bell Kreher, and was completed in 2004. Predock was "inspired by the biology, geology and hydrology of Southwest Georgia" in creating this facility. The facility is part of the Downtown Albany RiverFront Master Plan. Located on the banks of the Flint River at Pine Avenue and Front Street, it received the American Institute of Architects (AIA) award in 2005. It is one of the city's projects to reconnect the downtown to the river and a walkway along its banks.

The building wraps around the primary exhibit, which is the 15,000-square-foot (1,400 m^{2}) naturally landscaped Blue Hole and Cypress Creek. The building is designed to allude to the "complex Ocala limestone terrain of sinks, aquifers, caves and streams that exist below the surface." The Exhibits were designed by Lyons/Zaremba Inc. of Boston, Massachusetts

== See also ==
- Radium Springs, Georgia
