= La Luz del Oeste =

Historic place in New Mexico, United States

- U.S. National Register of Historic Places
- NM State Register of Cultural Properties
- Location within New Mexico Location within the United States
- Location: Loop One NW, Albuquerque, New Mexico
- Coordinates: 35°8′28″N 106°41′47″W
- Built: 1967–74
- Architect: Antoine Predock
- NRHP reference No.: 100009493
- NMSRCP No.: 539

Significant dates
- Added to NRHP: October 27, 2023
- Designated NMSRCP: December 9, 1977

La Luz del Oeste is a planned community on the West Side of Albuquerque, New Mexico, which is notable for its architecture and urban planning as an example of the New towns movement of the mid-20th century. The development consists of 96 townhouses along with shared community spaces and 40 acres (16 ha) of land which was left undeveloped as a viewshed toward the Rio Grande bosque and Sandia Mountains. It was designed by architect Antoine Predock in his first major commission and built between 1967 and 1974. The property was added to the New Mexico State Register of Cultural Properties in 1977 and the National Register of Historic Places in 2023.

The residential units of La Luz are arranged in terraced rows facing east toward the river. Vehicle and pedestrian routes are kept separate with a series of loop roads providing access to garages and parking areas at the rear of the units, while pedestrian access is from the front via landscaped paths and courtyards. The architecture of the development combined modernism with influences from the environmental movement and traditional Pueblo architecture in its organization of public and private spaces, use of efficient materials such as adobe, and conservation of the surrounding landscape.
