= Horseshoe Project =

Highway interchange in Dallas, Texas, United States

Horseshoe Interchange
- Interactive map of Horseshoe Interchange

Location
- Dallas, Texas
- Coordinates: 32°46′11″N 96°48′30″W
- Roads at junction: I-30 (Tom Landry Freeway, East R.L. Thornton Freeway); I-35E (South R.L. Thornton Freeway, Stemmons Freeway)

Construction
- Type: Modified stack interchange
- Constructed: 1958-1962 (Mixmaster); 2013-2017 (Horseshoe) by Pegasus Link Constructors
- Maintained by: TxDOT

The Horseshoe Project was a $798 million highway project that upgraded the congested Mix Master interchange in Downtown Dallas, Texas, connecting Interstate 35E (I-35E) and Interstate 30 (I-30). Construction began during the spring of 2013 and ended in 2017. The contractor was Pegasus Link Constructors, a partnership between Balfour Beatty Infrastructure and Fluor Enterprises. The project, which used the design-build project delivery system, included construction of the Margaret McDermott Bridge partially designed by Spanish civil engineer and architect Santiago Calatrava.

== Overview ==
In its previous state, the Mix Master was among the 17 most congested roadways in Texas, seeing more than 460,000 vehicles in a week. The project aimed to replace the bridges of I-30 and I-35E that cross the Trinity River, which were built in the 1930s and 1950s. With the completion of the project, the two highways now feature a combined 23 lanes, up from 16 lanes in the original interchange. The project "included the construction of more than 73 lane miles of new roadway, 37 conventional bridges and more than 60 retaining walls."

To fund the project, $500 million came from the federal government, and the remaining $298 million came from the state and local governments.

== The Mix Master ==
The original Mix Master was constructed between 1958 and 1962 and never saw significant change after its initial completion. Minor improvements included converting the shoulders to travel lanes and elevating the HOV Lane for I-35E over the interchange to Houston Street and Jefferson Boulevard. In the 1950s, most freeway traffic in the area was headed into Downtown; now most traffic bypasses it. The original interchange was thus primarily designed to simplify entering downtown, which created some disadvantages, including incomplete access and on-ramps in close proximity to off-ramps, resulting in significant weaving in and out of traffic.

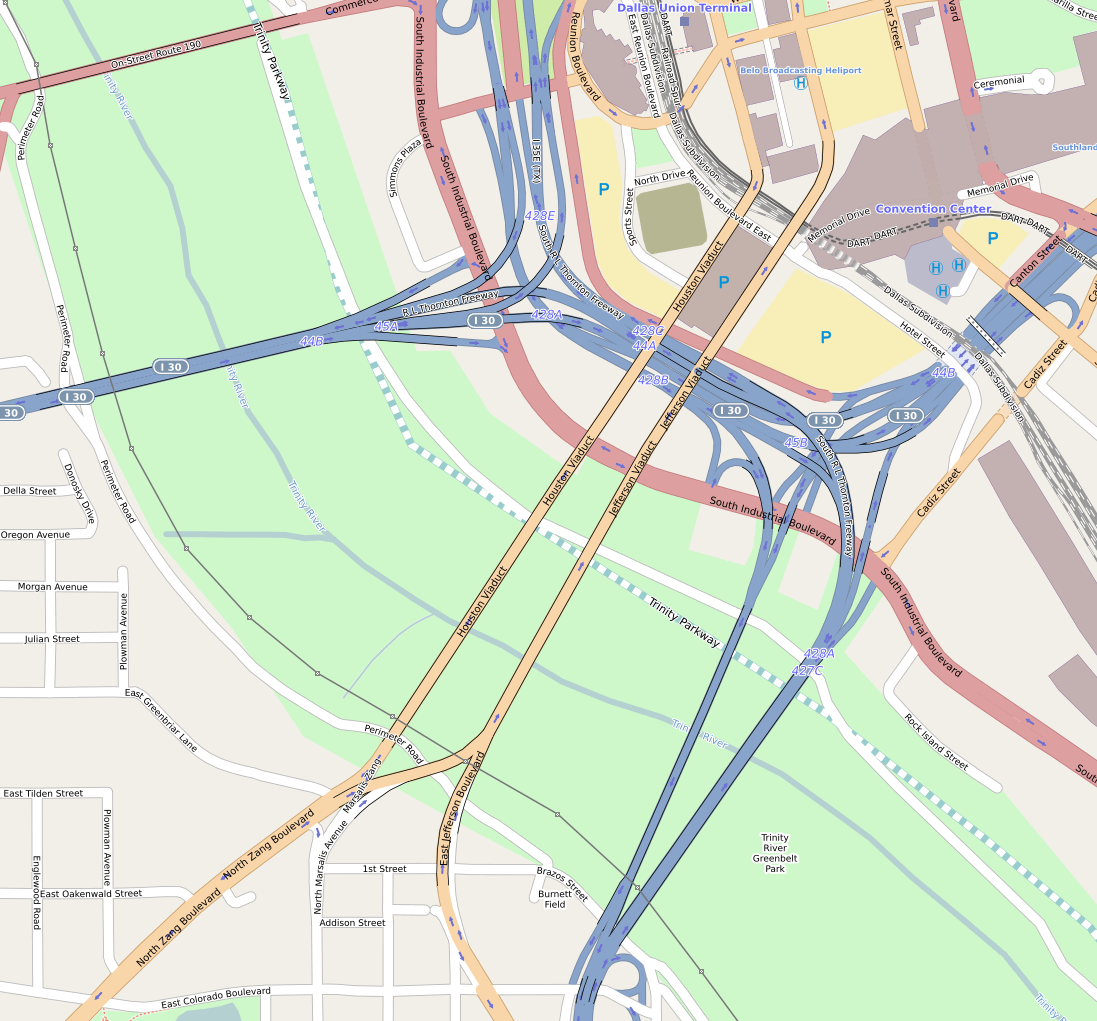
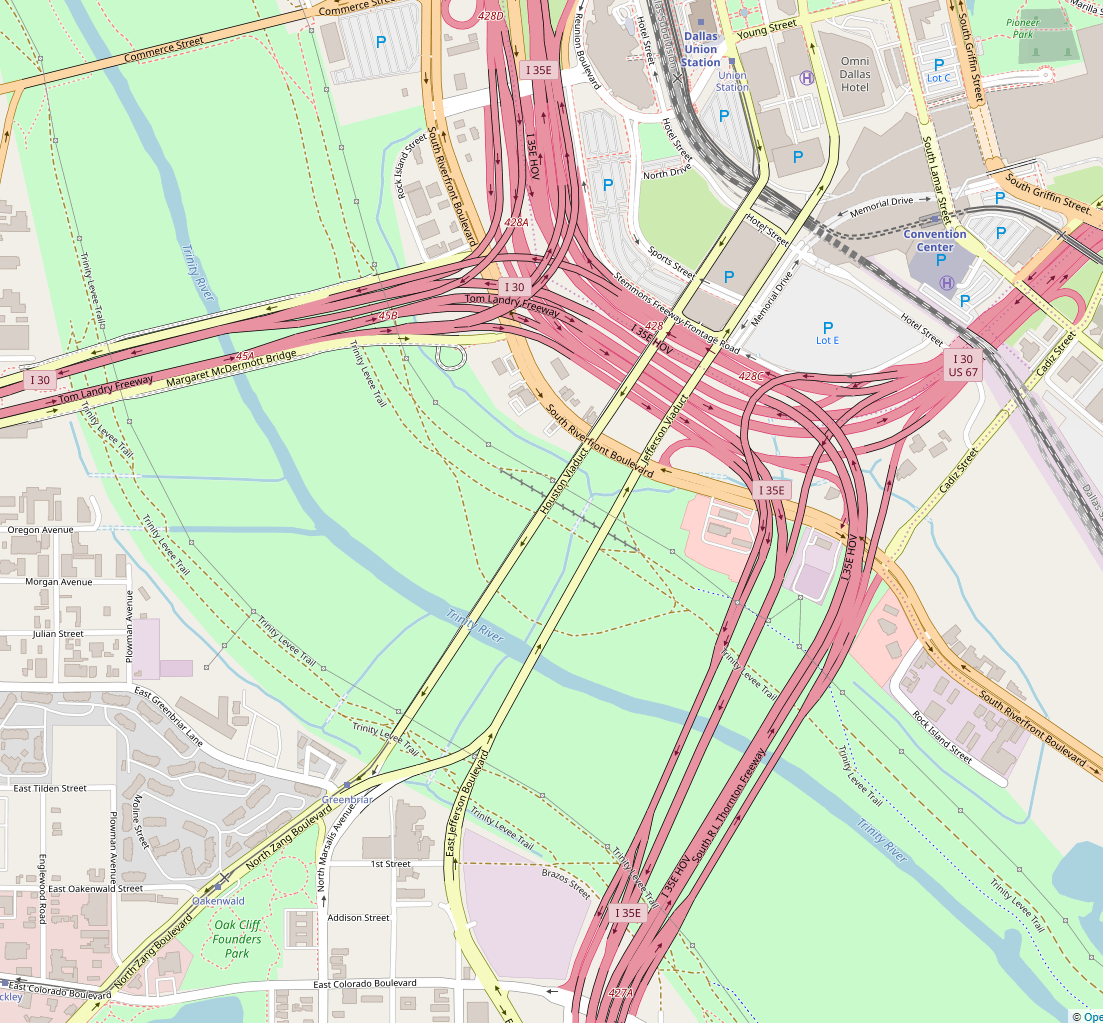
Mix Master interchange before and after Horseshoe Project completion

=== Layout ===
The Mix Master was essentially a highly modified stack interchange. Before the Horseshoe Project, there was no direct access from eastbound I-30 to southbound I-35E, or from northbound I-35E to westbound I-30. Due to this problem, many drivers used Riverfront Boulevard as a connecting route. The interchange also previously included several left-hand exits and low visibility points that the Horseshoe Project eliminated.

City streets in the area include Riverfront Boulevard, Jefferson Boulevard, Houston Street, Cadiz Street and Canton Street.

=== Awards ===
The project has won several engineering awards, including the Design-Build Institute of America's 2017 National Award of Merit in Transportation, the American Council of Engineering Companies (ACEC) of Texas's 2018 Engineer Excellence Award gold medal for transportation, and the 2018 ACEC National Engineering Excellence Honor Award.
