= Antoine Predock =

American southwestern architect (1936–2024)

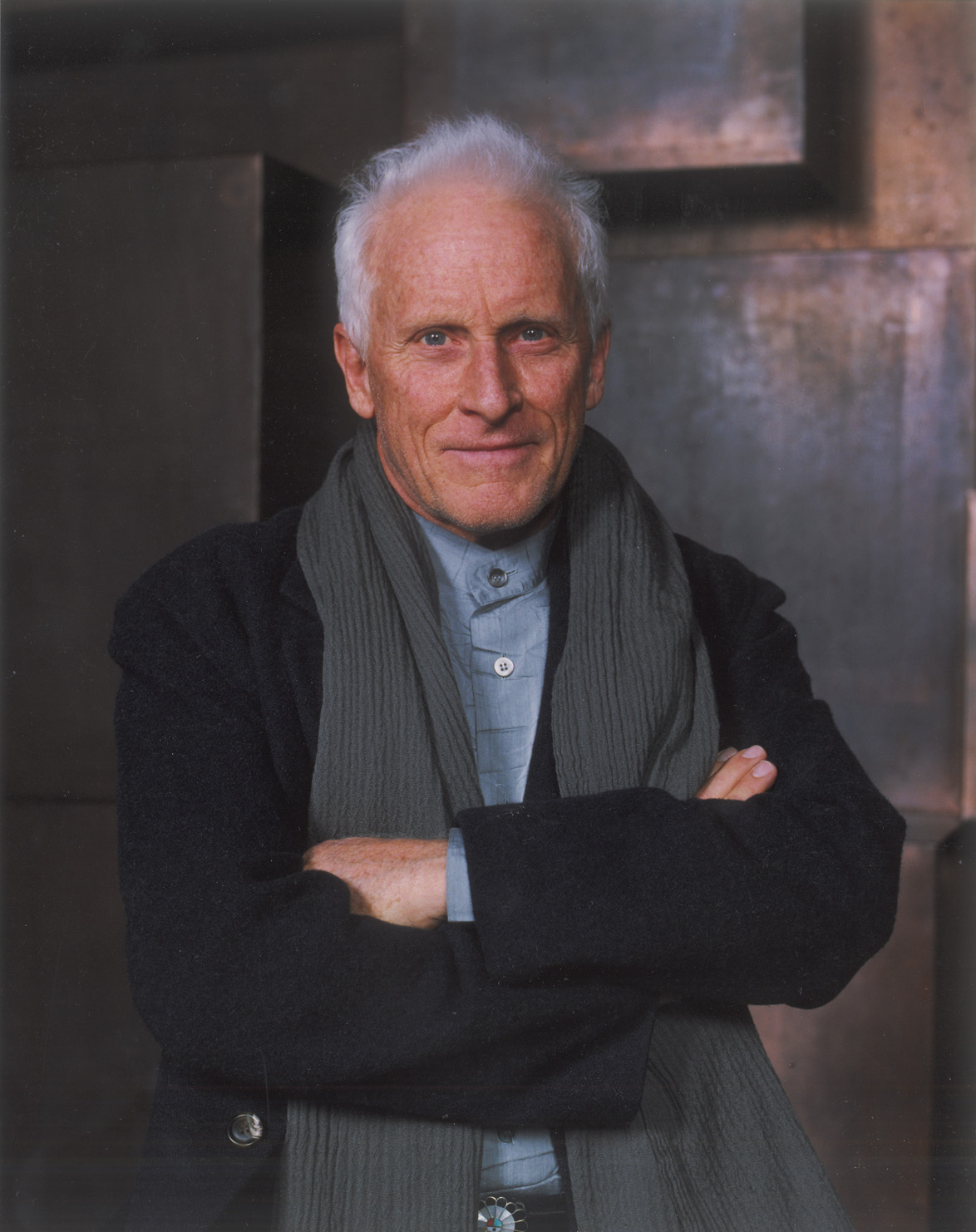
- Predock in 2005
- Born: Antoine Samuel Predock; June 24, 1936; Lebanon, Missouri, U.S.
- Died: March 2, 2024 (aged 87); Albuquerque, New Mexico, U.S.
- Education: Columbia University
- Occupation: Architect
- Spouses: Jennifer Masley (divorced); Constance DeJong (m. 2004)
- Children: 2
- Awards: Rome Prize (1985), AIA Gold Medal (2006), National Design Award (2007)
- Buildings: Petco Park
- Design: Angular, brutalist-type building designs

Antoine Samuel Predock (/ˈpriːdɒk/ PREE-dok; June 24, 1936 – March 2, 2024) was an American architect based in Albuquerque, New Mexico. He was the principal of Antoine Predock Architect PC, the studio he founded in 1967.

Predock first gained national attention with the La Luz community in Albuquerque, New Mexico. The first national design competition he won was held by the Nelson Fine Arts Center at Arizona State University. Predock's work includes the Turtle Creek House, built in 1993 for bird enthusiasts along a prehistoric trail in Texas, the Tang Teaching Museum and Art Gallery at Skidmore College, and a new ballpark for the San Diego Padres, Petco Park. He also worked on international sites such as the National Palace Museum Southern Branch in Southern Taiwan and the Canadian Museum for Human Rights in Winnipeg, Manitoba.

Predock said his design was highly influenced by his connection to New Mexico.

== Early life ==
Antoine Samuel Predock was born in Lebanon, Missouri, on June 24, 1936. He considered himself an Albuquerque native, though he did not move there until college. Predock credits his mother, who had majored in liberal arts in college, for his artistic inclination, and his father, an engineer, for his technical interests.

Predock first attended the University of Missouri in Columbia School of Engineering, then the University of New Mexico, where he studied engineering, emulating his father. Although he was a successful and academically inclined student, Predock found little fulfillment in his studies in engineering. Upon completing a technical drawing course taught by Don Schlegel, an architecture professor at UNM, Predock began to reevaluate his career choices. After a short hiatus from academic life, he returned to UNM at age 21 to study architecture. Schlegel acted as an advisor to Predock throughout the latter's time in the UNM architecture program. Eventually, Schlegel told Predock that he had taken advantage of all that UNM had to offer and encouraged him to apply elsewhere. Predock did, and was accepted to Columbia University, where he obtained his B.A. in architecture.

== Career ==
Predock established his first office in Albuquerque, New Mexico in 1967. Other offices were established in California and Taipei.

Predock and his firm planned, developed, and collaborated on over 100 buildings and projects. They were featured in over 60 exhibitions, 250 books, and over 1,000 publications. He also held various teaching positions at at least 14 universities, in the United States and elsewhere.

== Personal life and death ==
Predock's first marriage, to Jennifer Masley, ended in divorce. He married his second wife, Constance DeJong, in 2004. Predock was the father of two sons.

Predock died from idiopathic pulmonary fibrosis at his home in Albuquerque on March 2, 2024, at the age of 87.

== Awards and honors ==
- International Fellow, Royal Institute of British Architects (2015)
- Fellow, Royal Architectural Institute of Canada (2014)
- Senior Fellow, Design Futures Council (2010)
- Cooper-Hewitt National Design Museum Lifetime Achievement Award (2007)
- AIA Gold Medal (2006)
- Honorary Doctor of Humane Letters, University of Minnesota (2001)
- New Mexico Governor's Award for Excellence in the Arts (1989)
- Fellow, American Academy in Rome (1985)
- William Kinne Fellows Traveling Prize, Columbia University (1962-63)

== Projects ==
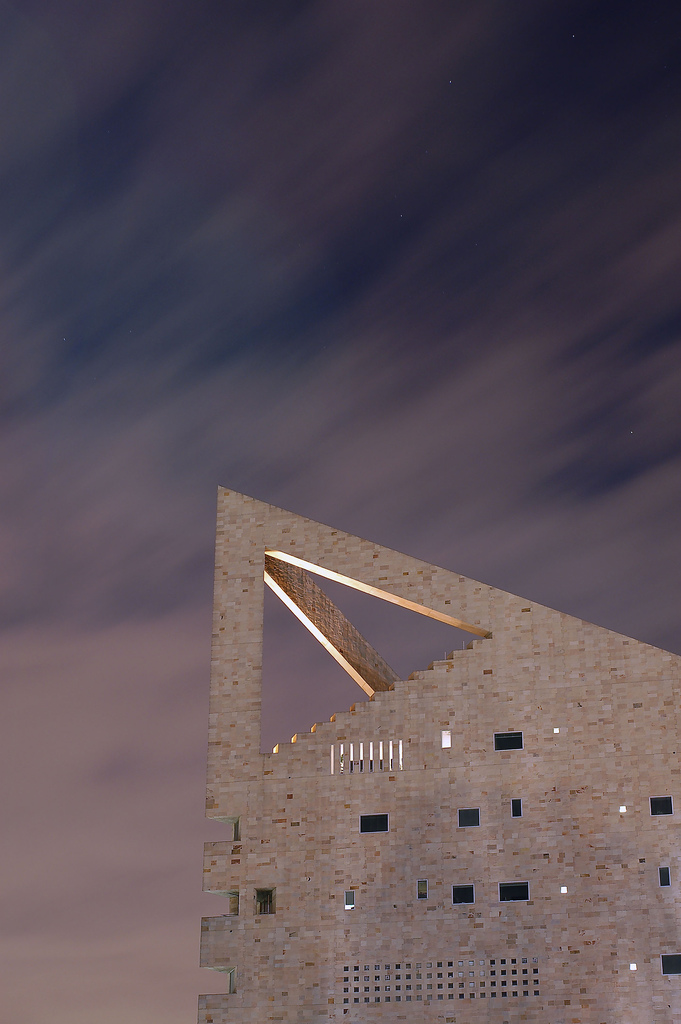
CLA Building at California State Polytechnic University, Pomona

National Palace Museum Southern Branch, Taiwan (model)

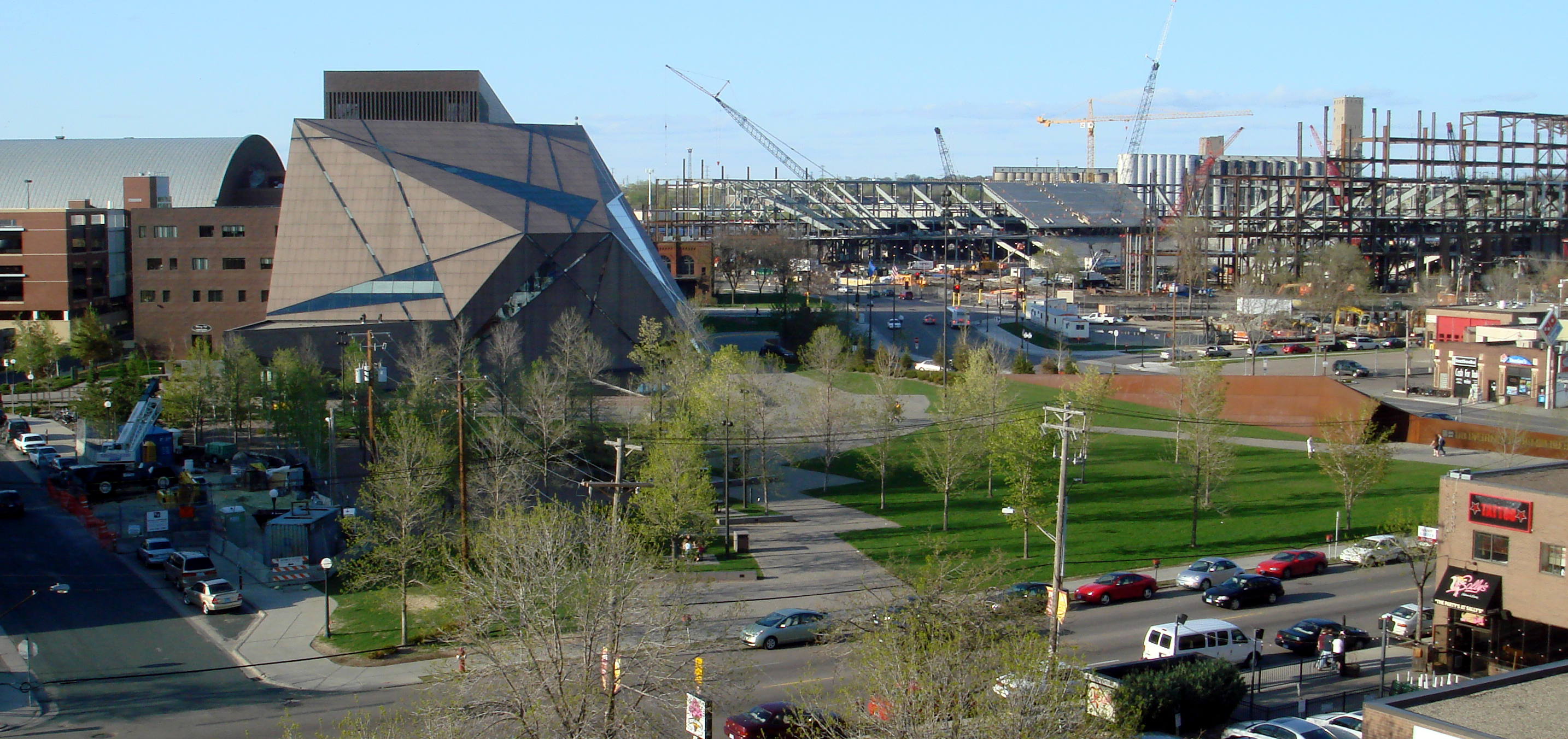
McNamara Alumni Center, Minneapolis, Minnesota.

- 1970 – La Luz Community, New Mexico
- 1971 – University of New Mexico Law School building
- 1979 – Albuquerque Museum, New Mexico
- 1982 – Rio Grande Nature Center, New Mexico
- 1989 – Nelson Fine Arts Center, Arizona State University, Arizona
- 1990 – Las Vegas Central Library + Children’s Museum, Nevada
- 1991 – Mandell Weiss Forum, University of California, San Diego
- 1991 – Venice Beach House, California
- 1992 – Classroom + Laboratory Building, California State Polytechnic University, Pomona (Cal Poly Pomona), demolished in 2022
- 1992 – Hotel Santa Fe at Euro Disney, France
- 1993 – American Heritage Center, University of Wyoming
- 1993 – Turtle Creek House, Texas
- 1994 – Mesa Public Library, Los Alamos, New Mexico
- 1994 – Social Sciences + Humanities Building, University of California, Davis
- 1994 – Thousand Oaks Civic Arts Plaza, California
- 1995 – Museum of Science & Industry, Tampa, Florida
- 1995 – Ventana Vista School, Arizona
- 1996 – Center for Integrated Systems, Stanford University, California
- 1996 – Center for Musical Arts, University of California, Santa Cruz
- 1997 – Arizona Science Center, Arizona
- 1997 – Center for Nanoscale Science + Technology, Rice University, Texas
- 1997 – Dance Studio, University of California, San Diego
- 1997 – Spencer Theater, New Mexico
- 2000 – McNamara Alumni Center, University of Minnesota
- 2000 – Tang Teaching Museum – Skidmore College, New York
- 2003 – Robert Hoag Rawlings Public Library, Colorado
- 2003 – Tacoma Art Museum, Washington
- 2004 – Austin City Hall, Texas
- 2004 – Flint RiverQuarium, Georgia
- 2004 – Performing Arts + Learning Center, Pima Community College, Arizona
- 2004 – Petco Park, the home of the San Diego Padres
- 2004 – National Palace Museum Southern Branch, Taiwan (withdrawn in 2008)
- 2006 – Discovery Canyon Campus, Colorado
- 2006 – Highlands Pond House, Colorado
- 2006 – Recreation Facility, Ohio State University, Ohio
- 2007 – George Pearl Hall, School of Architecture, University of New Mexico
- 2007 – Indian Community School, Franklin, Wisconsin
- 2007 – Doudna Fine Arts Center, Eastern Illinois University
- 2008 – Trinity River Audubon Center, Dallas, Texas
- 2008 – Edith Kinney Gaylord Cornerstone Arts Center, Colorado College
- 2014 – Canadian Museum for Human Rights, Winnipeg, Manitoba
- In Progress – Inn at The French Laundry, California
