= Margaret McDermott Bridge =

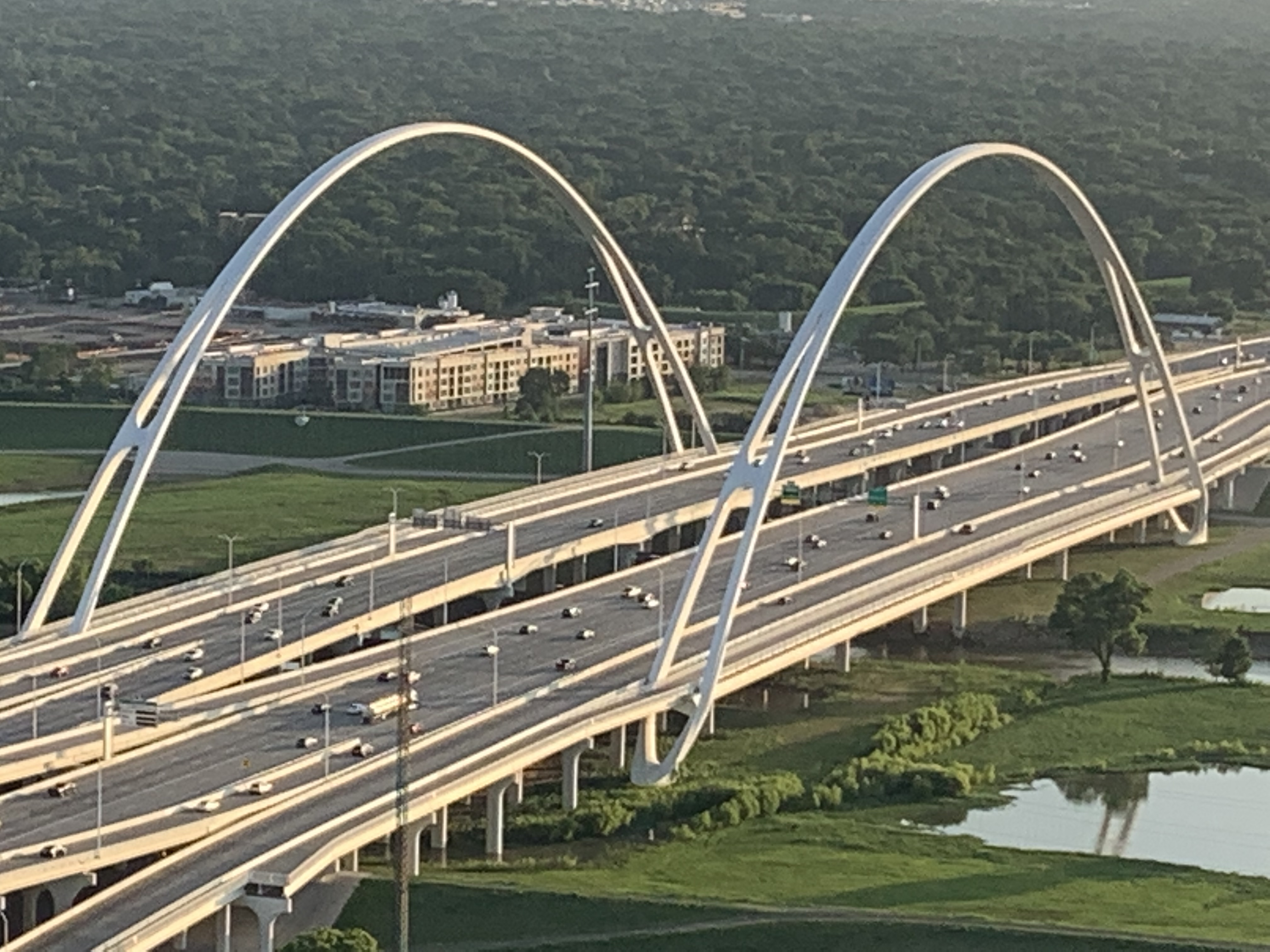
- The Margaret McDermott Bridge in Dallas as seen in July 2021
- Coordinates: 32°46′13.4″N 96°49′06.6″W
- Carries: I-30, pedestrians, bicycles
- Crosses: Trinity River
- Locale: Dallas, Texas
- Owner: TxDOT

Characteristics
- Design: Cable-stayed bridge with suspended arches
- Material: Steel, Concrete
- Height: 340 feet (100 m)
- Longest span: 1,125 feet (343 m)

History
- Designer: Santiago Calatrava, in part
- Constructed by: Balfour Beatty / Fluor PLC Joint Venture Substructure: PLC JV, Drill Shaft; Texas Shaft Superstructure: American Bridge Co.
- Fabrication by: Tampa Steel Erecting Company
- Construction start: 2012
- Construction end: 2017
- Construction cost: $100 million+
- Opened: 2013
- Inaugurated: Spring 2021
- Replaces: Interstate 30 Trinity River Bridge

Statistics
- Toll: None

Location
- Interactive map of Margaret McDermott Bridge

The Margaret McDermott Bridge is a conventional concrete pier-and-beam freeway bridge with cable-stayed bike lines over the Trinity River in Dallas, Texas. It replaced the late-1950s to early-1960s Interstate 30 (I-30) bridge, which reached its end of life. It was partially designed by Santiago Calatrava, and is part of the Trinity River Project and the Horseshoe Project. It was named for Margaret McDermott, an area philanthropist.

== History ==
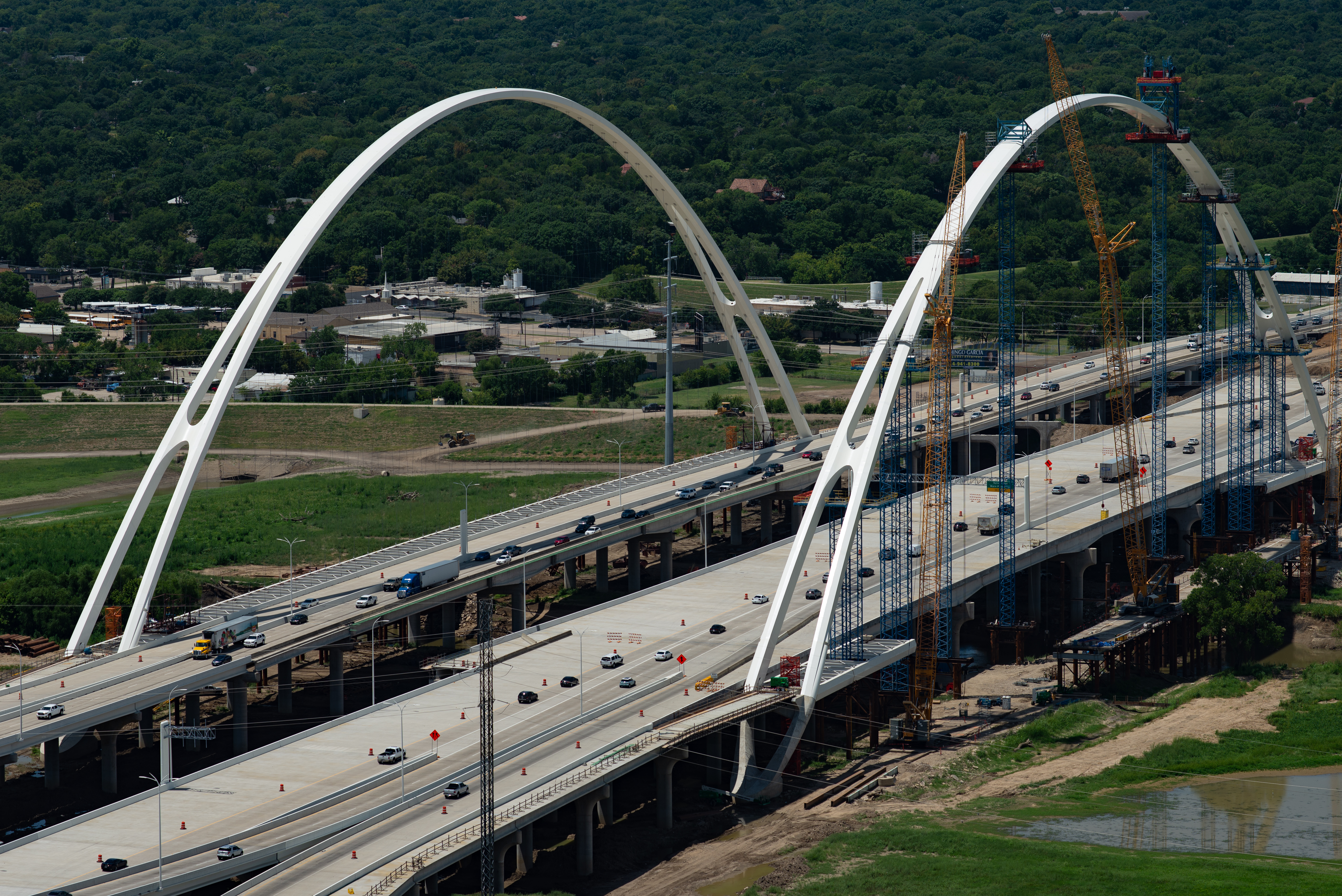
Margaret McDermott Bridge Under Construction as seen from Reunion Tower in July 2016

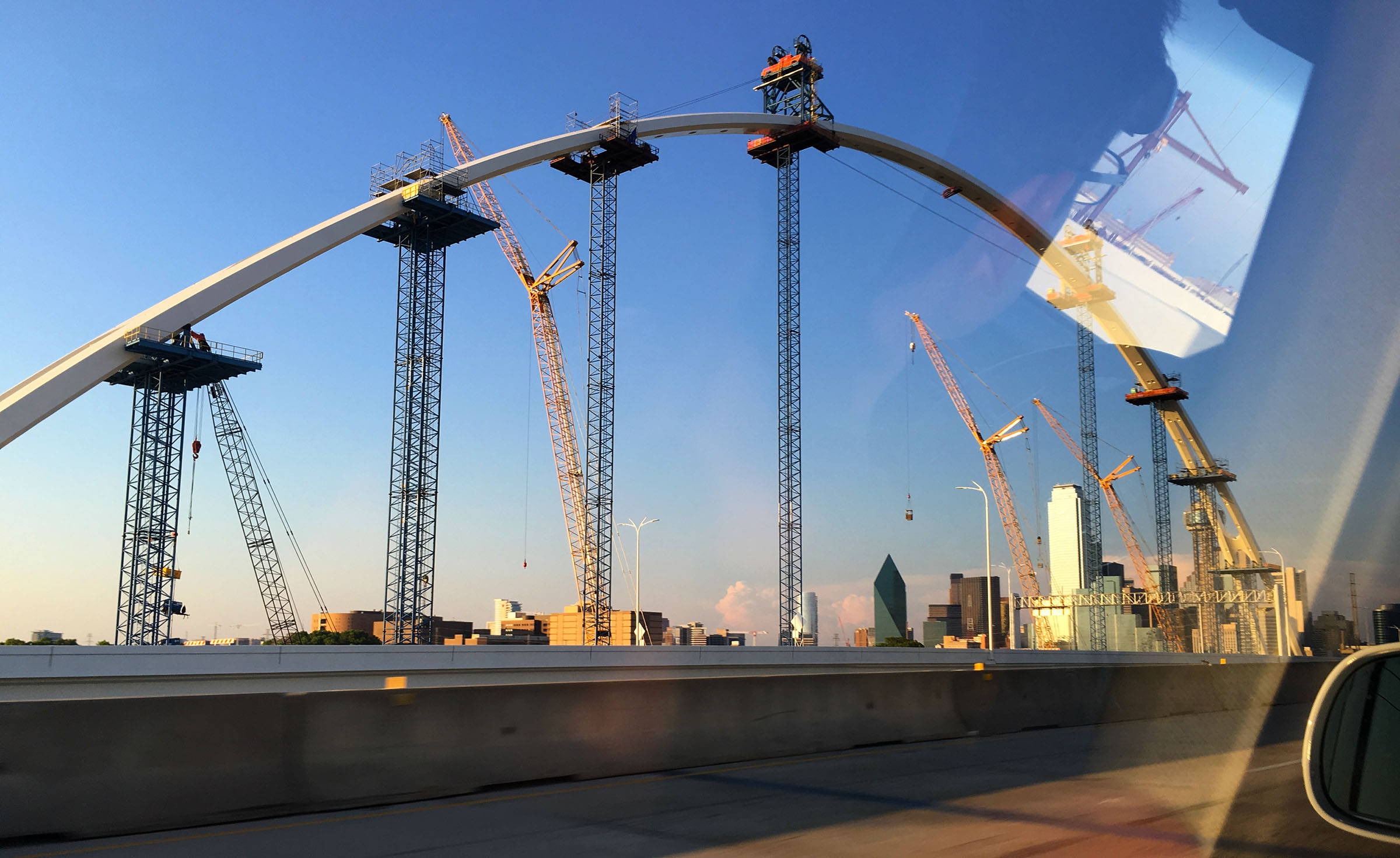
Margaret McDermott Bridge during construction in 2016

As part of the Trinity River Project and Horseshoe Project, the Margaret McDermott Bridge was one of three new Santiago Calatrava-designed bridges planned to cross the Trinity River. However, plans for the McDermott Bridge were scaled back, and plans for a third bridge along I-35E were scrapped, due to budget issues. On December 12, 2005, construction of the Margaret Hunt Hill Bridge began, and it opened on March 29, 2012.

The Margaret McDermott Bridge was planned to replace the existing I-30 bridge over the Trinity River. It was originally scheduled to begin construction in 2011 and be completed by 2014. However, in late 2011 funding for the bridge was moved to come from within the Project Pegasus initiative, with construction contracts awarded in mid-2012. The new plan featured "toned-down" elements of its original arch design, although Calatrava was still scheduled to perform the design work.

After delays, construction on the bridge began in 2012, costing over $200 million. Specifically, the arched pedestrian and bicycle bridges cost $115 million, while the actual freeway bridge was paid for by the state and cost an additional $120 million. The main concrete part of the bridge, which carries I-30 traffic, opened in 2013. The 1,200-foot-long (370 m) steel suspension arches on both sides of the bridge, which also house the pedestrian and bicycle paths, are separate from the concrete part. In April 2014, footings for the arches were constructed, while steel fabrication took place at Tampa Steel Erecting Company's plant in Florida. The superstructure subcontractor to CRC Joint Venture, American Bridge, expected steel components to arrive on site in Dallas during the fall of 2014. The steel arches were completed in 2017, and the entire bridge was planned to open by the end of the year.

Despite the concrete part of the bridge being open to I-30 traffic, the arched pedestrian and bicycle bridges remained closed, due to concerns with cables that connect the arch to the base of the bridges, and their resistance to heavy winds. When they vibrate from these winds, this has resulted in multiple incidents where the stress from the vibrations caused several cable anchor rods to fail. Furthermore, the stress has also caused the bridges to crack significantly and resulted in multiple occasions in which rods were cracked and twisted, with the small diameter of the rods resulting on putting more stress on them. The lack of testing and the multiple issues plaguing the bridges led to a large dispute; Calatrava blamed the contractor for a lack of testing and using the wrong parts, and state transportation officials blamed Calatrava and the city of Dallas. As a result of that and the need to add additional painting and lighting, the opening of the arched bridges for pedestrian and bicycle traffic was delayed until June of 2021.

In April 2019, the Dallas City Council approved a repair expected to cost over $7 million and take over three years. The arched pedestrian bridge has resulted in a dispute between the City, TxDOT, and now the engineering firm responsible for the dangerous final product. So far, there are not reports that cables have struck vehicles. In January 2021, the Dallas Morning News reported that the bridge could be open to pedestrians to walk and bike over the Trinity River before the end of the year.

The bridge officially opened to pedestrians and cyclists in June 2021.

== Architecture ==
The bridge consists of a conventional concrete pier-and-beam concrete part which has a 1,125 feet (343 m) main span. The concrete part carries 10 main lanes of I-30 traffic with one reversible high-occupancy vehicle lane and four frontage road lanes. The decorative steel arches are both 350 feet (110 m) tall, and house paths for bicycle and pedestrian facilities.
