= Margaret Hunt Hill Bridge =

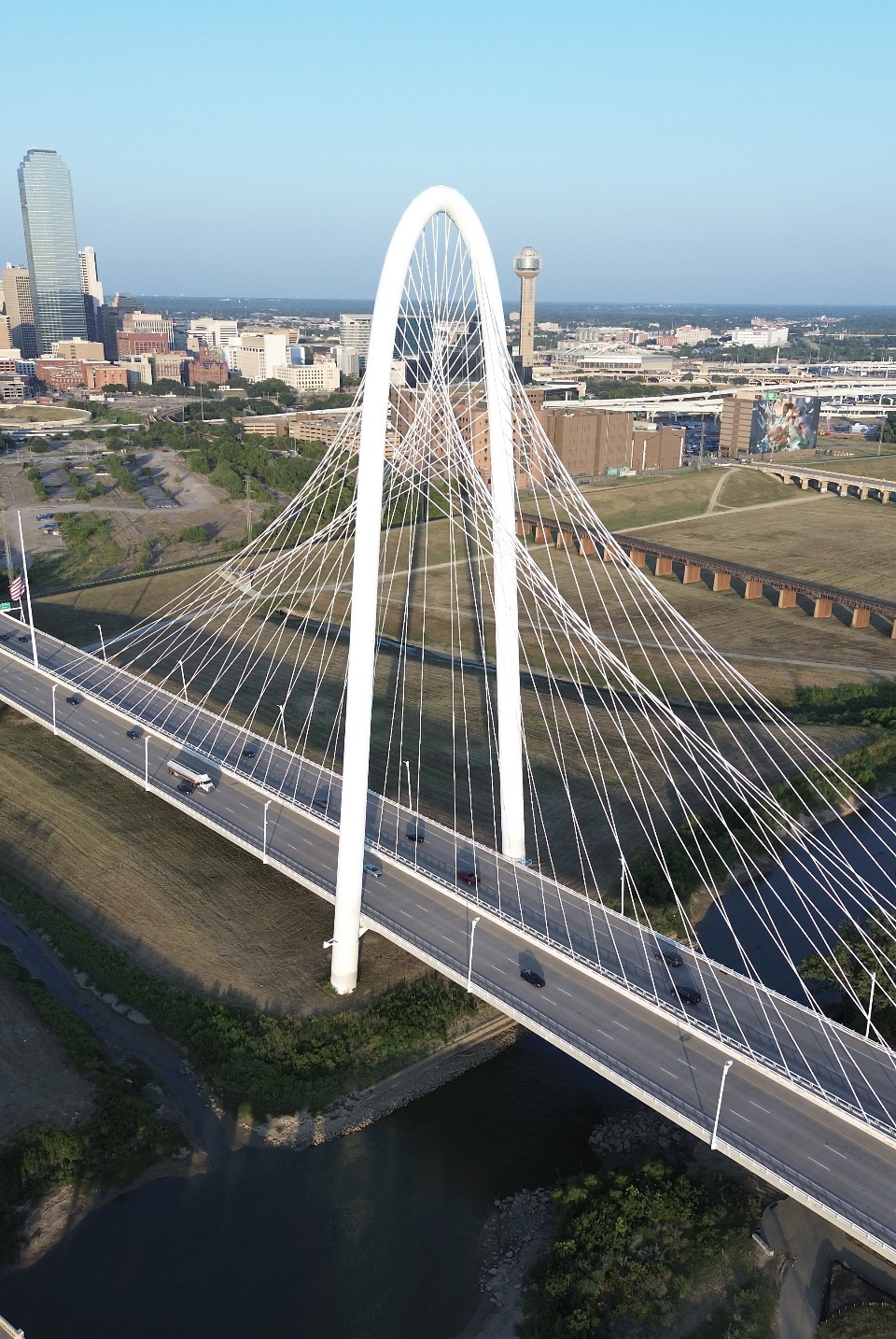
- Margaret Hunt Hill Bridge in 2026
- Coordinates: 32.7800°N 96.8221°W
- Carries: 6 lanes of Spur 366
- Crosses: Trinity River
- Locale: Dallas, Texas

Characteristics
- Design: Cable-stayed bridge
- Total length: 1,206 feet (368 m)
- Height: 400 feet (120 m) central arch pylon
- Longest span: 603 feet (184 m)

History
- Designer: Santiago Calatrava
- Opened: March 29, 2012; 14 years ago

Statistics
- Toll: None

Location
- Interactive map of Margaret Hunt Hill Bridge

The Margaret Hunt Hill Bridge is a cable-stayed bridge in Dallas, Texas, that spans the Trinity River. The bridge is named for Margaret Hunt Hill, an heiress and philanthropist. The bridge was constructed as part of the Trinity River Project. Designed by Santiago Calatrava, it is one of three such bridges planned to be built over the Trinity; the second, the Margaret McDermott Bridge, is completed; the third cancelled. The span parallels the Ronald Kirk Bridge, a walking bridge that was previously the Continental Avenue bridge.

== History ==
The bridge, which opened in March 2012, is the first of a series of bridges that the office of Santiago Calatrava designed to span the Trinity River in downtown Dallas. The bridge connects Spur 366 (Woodall Rodgers Freeway) in downtown to Singleton Boulevard in West Dallas. Construction on the bridge began in December 2005. The bridge cost $117 million to build. A Dallas Morning News analysis put the project's total cost at $182 million. Beginning in 2004, The Trinity Trust Foundation successfully worked to secure private funds in support of the Trinity River Corridor Project, including the Margaret Hunt Hill Bridge, Margaret McDermott Bridge, Ronald Kirk Bridge, trails and other components of the project.

On June 26, 2010, the signature 40-story center-support arch was topped with a central curved span, which can now be seen from many miles away in several directions. The arch provides an additional feature to the Downtown Dallas skyline.

In 2012, the bridge received an Outstanding Civil Engineering Achievement Award from the Texas section of the American Society of Civil Engineers. The bridge also received a 2012 European Convention for Constructional Steelwork Award For Steel Bridges.

On June 1, 2020 at approximately 9:00 PM, several hundred protesters marching on the bridge were arrested in a kettling maneuver when Dallas Police routed the protest onto the bridge, blocked in the demonstration on both sides, fired teargas and pepper balls into the nonviolent crowd, then detained all protesters on the bridge for several hours. On June 4, former Dallas Police Chief U. Reneé Hall announced that the protesters would not be charged following several days of attention and backlash from community members, political figures, local news outlets, and activist groups.

== Architecture ==
View of the Margaret Hunt Hill Bridge, a Santiago Calatrava-designed bridge over the Trinity River in Dallas, Texas

The cable-stayed bridge supports its 1,206 feet (368 m) length and 603 feet (184 m) main span with a steel arch perpendicular to the roadway and a peak height of 400 feet (122 m). An array of twisting cables connect the underside of the arch's curved pylon to the bridge's platform. Fifty-eight (58) white strands descend from the arch and secure themselves along the centerline of the platform. The 16 feet (4.9 m) diameter support is composed of 25 individual segments, secured with 20,000 pounds (9,100 kg) of bolts and additional 450 tons (408,233 kg) of concrete. The bridge provides six lanes for vehicular traffic.

The bridge closely resembles two of three bridges constructed in 2005-2006 above the Autostrada A1 motorway and connecting roads in Reggio Emilia, Italy, that Calatrava had earlier designed. In 2009, the European Convention for Constructional Steelwork gave the two bridges a European Steel Design Award, stating that the structures' original visual effects at different angles give the bridges "the aspect of huge musical instruments."

== Gallery ==
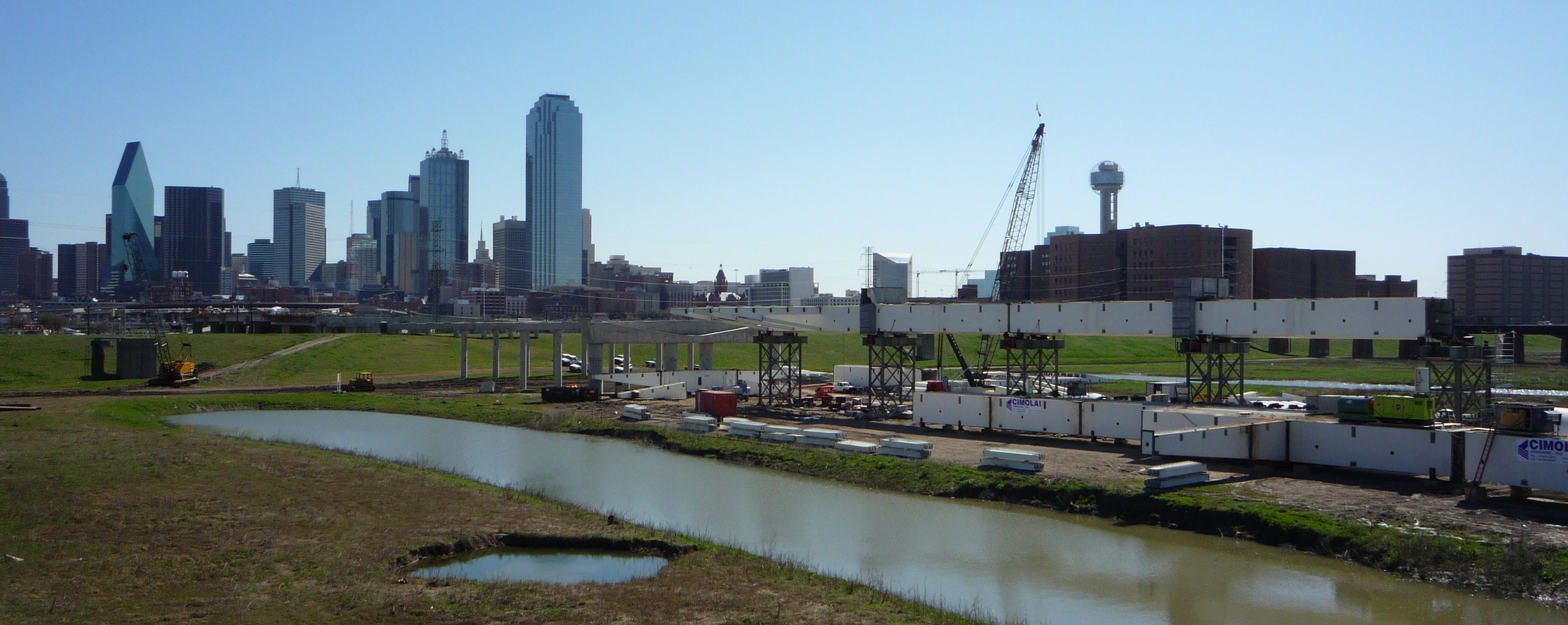
Construction in March 2010

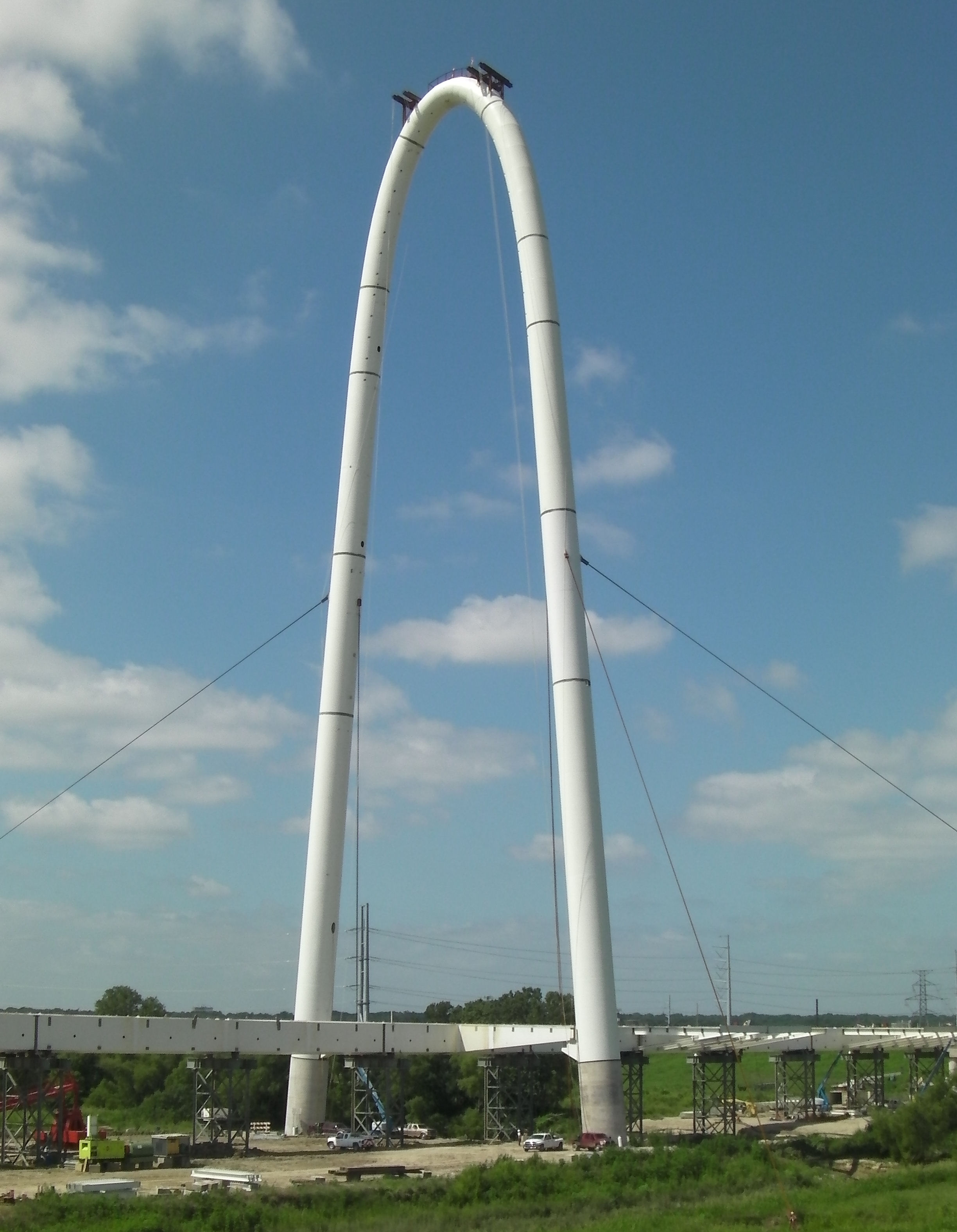
Construction in July 2010

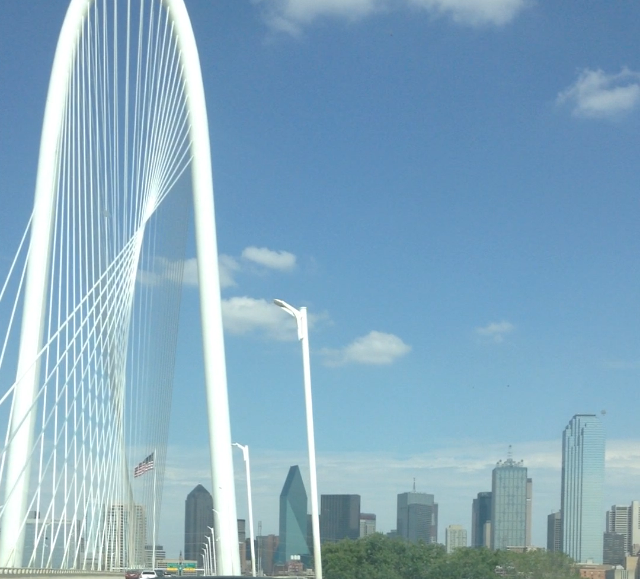
Margaret Hunt Hill Bridge with Dallas skyline in background (May 2014)

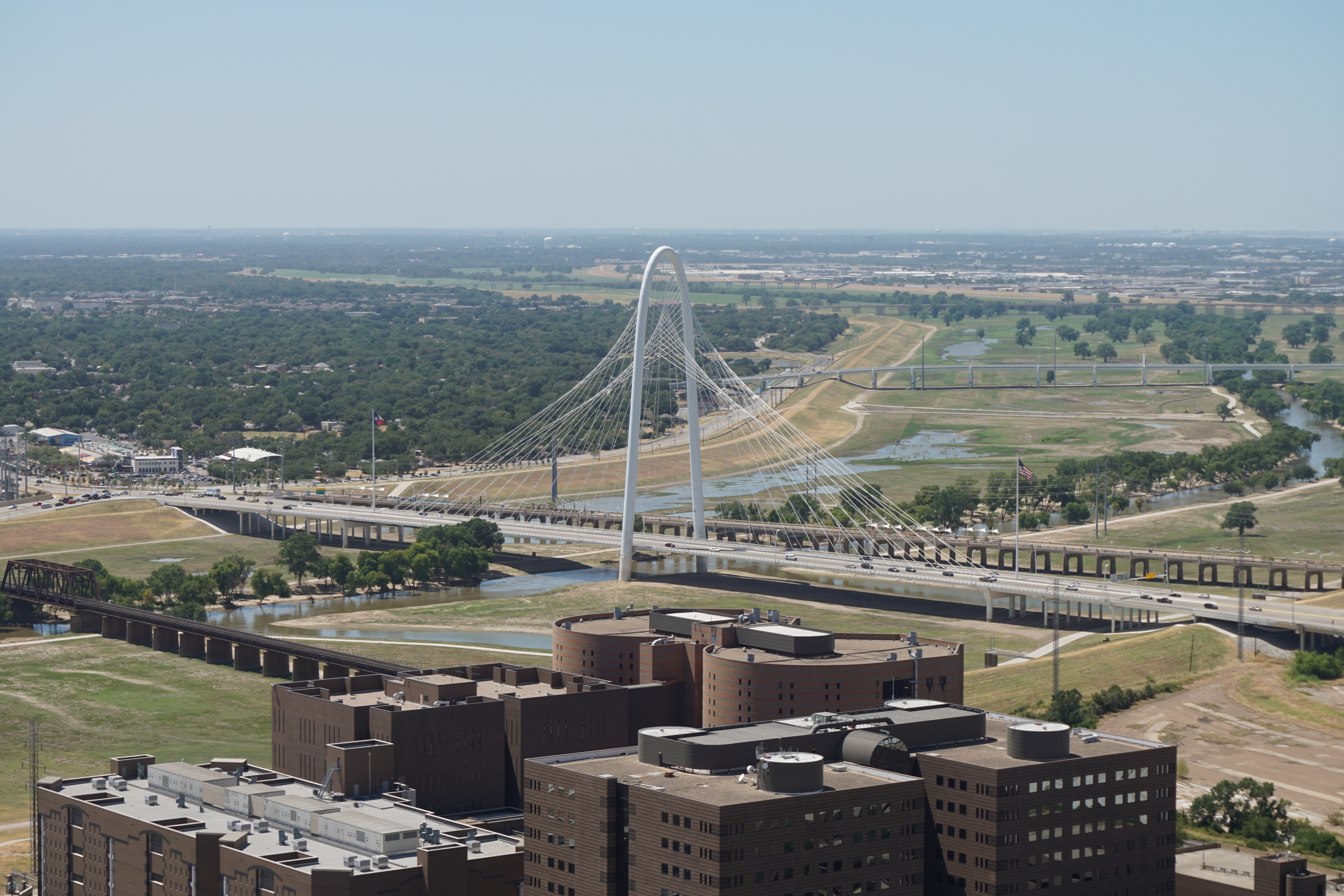
Margaret Hunt Hill Bridge as seen from the Reunion Tower (August 2015)

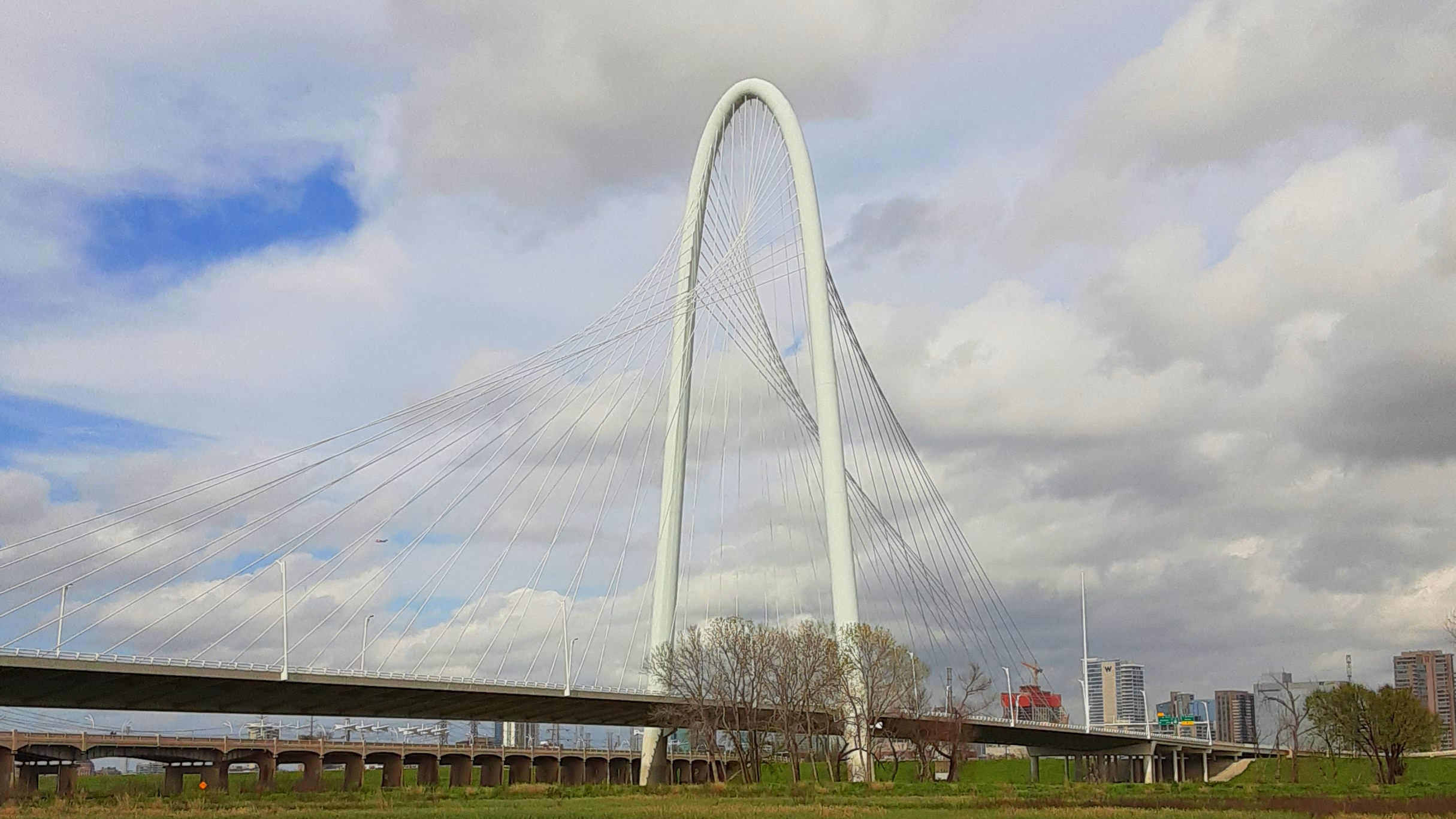
Margaret Hunt Hill Bridge in March 2020
Panoramic view of construction in July 2010.
