= Great Trinity Forest =

Urban forest on the outskirts of Dallas, Texas

Coordinates: 32.726°N 96.747°W

The Great Trinity Forest is a forested urban park located on the southern outskirts of the heavily urbanized area of southern Dallas, Texas, and it is recognized as one of the largest urban forests in the United States.

== Description ==
The park is part of the larger Trinity River Project, which when complete will be one of the largest urban parks in the world at 10,000 acres (40 km^{2}) in size.

The Great Trinity Forest portion of the project consists of 6,000 acres (24 km^{2}), primarily in the area of the Trinity River as it traverses Dallas County just south of Downtown Dallas. In 1983, the Texas Legislature designated 900 acres of the area to be the Trinity River State Park, however, the Texas Parks and Wildlife Department later said the department had no funding to own and operate such a park. In 1997, the Dallas City Council adopted the Great Trinity Forest Management Plan. In 2019, the City Council adopted a resolution protecting the forest and its some 6,000 acres; the resolution states Dallas' Park and Recreation Department should play a role in conserving and managing the area.

== Nature ==
The Great Trinity Forest urban park is located within the Texas Blackland Prairies ecoregion. Habitats within it include bottomland hardwood forests, riparian zones, wetlands, open water ponds, grasslands, and the Trinity River itself. The area includes old growth hardwoods, as well as invasive trees like the Chinese privet. Documented wildlife include swamp rabbit, feral hog, barred owl, coyote, white-tailed deer, striped skunk, armadillo, yellow-crowned night heron, wild turkey, bobcat and Cooper's hawk.

The southeast portion of a 50-mile hike-and-bike loop around Dallas — known as The Loop — runs through the Great Trinity Forest. The loop project joins 11 separate trails for form a loop around the city and is expected to be fully completed by 2027. The Trinity River Trail links the Trinity River Audubon Center, Texas Horse Park, Trinity Forest Golf Club and Joppa Preserve.

== Features ==
The Great Trinity Forest includes the remnants of a lock and dam system at McCommas Bluff. The structure was built in 1909 as part of an overarching plan to make the Trinity River navigable by steamboat from the Gulf of Mexico. An abandoned structure known as the Lock Keeper's House sat at the site and was recognized as a Texas Historic Landmark but was destroyed by fire in 2023.
