= Trinity River Project =

Public works project in Dallas, Texas

The Trinity River Project is a public works project undertaken in the 2000s in the city of Dallas, Texas, United States. Its goal is to redevelop the Trinity River. The project aims to turn the river's path into a collection of sports fields, trails, nature centers, and recreational opportunities. At 10,000 acres (4,000 ha) (including the Great Trinity Forest, which at 6,000 acres (24 km^{2}) is the largest urban bottomland forest in the world), it is one of the larger urban parks in the United States.

== History ==
In the late 1980s through mid-1990s, a large citizens' committee initiated by the Dallas City Council worked with staff from the City of Dallas and the regional Council of Governments (COG) to prepare a plan for use of the Trinity River Corridor in Dallas. Neighborhood groups, environmental groups and business interests formed the large majority of the members. Neighborhoods wanted recreational amenities; environmental groups wanted to preserve one of the largest remaining riparian forests in the state of Texas; business groups wanted to build a multi-lane highway along the river corridor. Charlie Johnson of the Loop 12 area chaired the subcommittee that named the large natural area near the confluence of White Rock Creek as The Great Trinity Forest. She was also a tireless advocate for the people of her minority neighborhood. Environmentalists such as Ned and Genie Fritz of the Texas Conservation Association and Diana Christopulos of the Sierra Club's Dallas Group were instrumental in the original conservation planning, and many others have carried it on for over 30 years. The Great Trinity River Project has since become one of the most impressive municipal efforts combining conservation, recreation and thoughtful development.

Mayor Steve Bartlett was largely supportive of the citizens' committee efforts. However, Mayor Ron Kirk initially rejected all work to date when he assumed office. He preferred business and commercial ventures.

Businesses and businessmen, like Ross Perot, Jr., have pushed in recent years to build a multimillion-dollar, landmark bridge over the river and convert the section of the river near downtown into a park area, with nearby commercial and retail services, somewhat similar to the River Walk in San Antonio or Lady Bird Lake in Austin.

In 1998, then-mayor Ron Kirk championed a much more commercial project that aimed to renovate the river through Dallas. Voters approved a bond proposal to fund a major cleanup of the river, construction of park facilities, wildlife habitats, flood-protection devices such as levees, and related road construction. Once passed, a planning process began with construction on the project starting in 2005. Proponents believe this development will bring more life, commerce, revenue to the downtown Dallas region.

In 2004, The Trinity Trust Foundation was formed to raise public awareness and secure private funds in support of the Trinity River Corridor Project, including the Margaret Hunt Hill Bridge, Margaret McDermott Bridge, Ronald Kirk Bridge, trails and other components of the project.

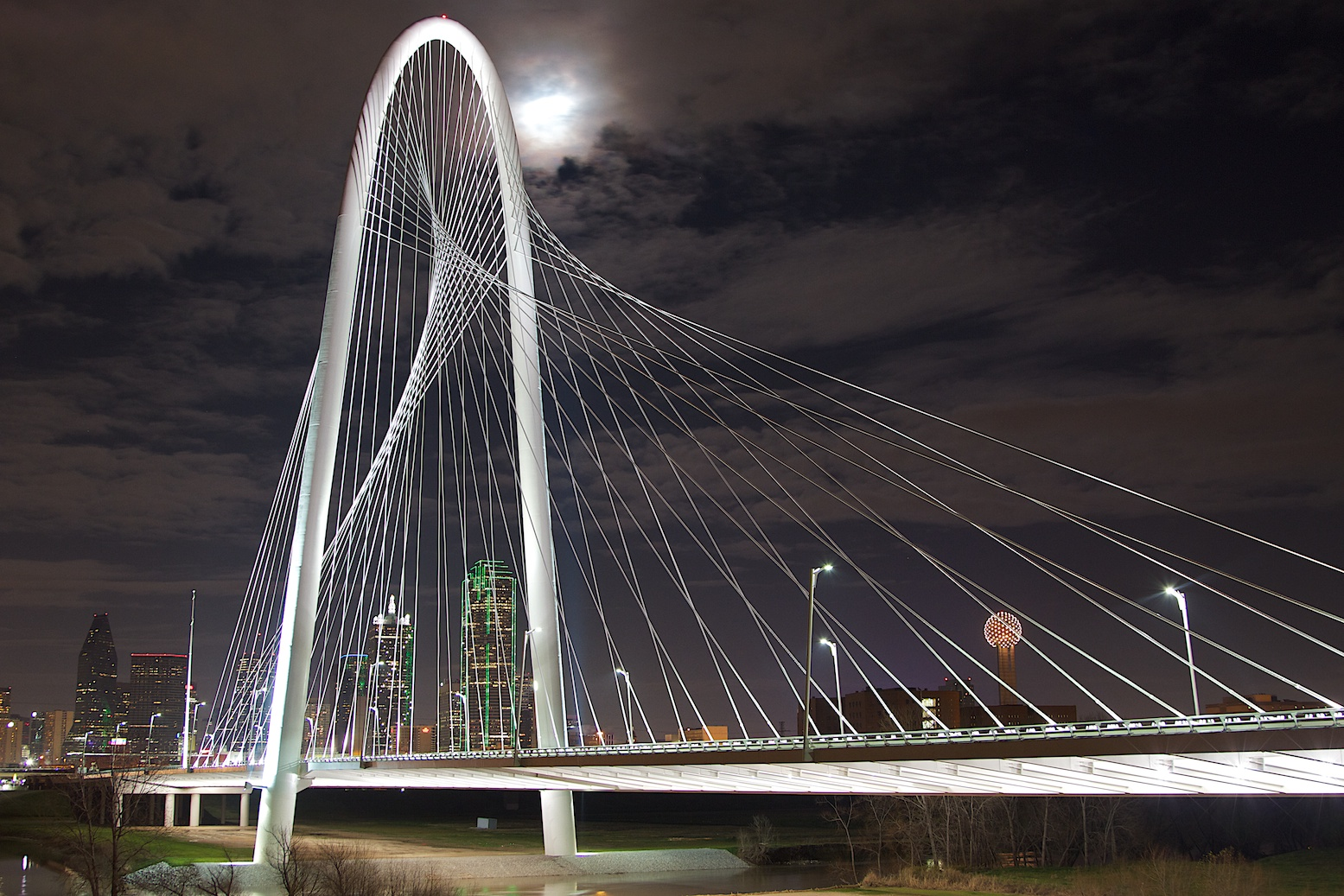
Margaret Hunt Hill Bridge (2012)

On December 12, 2005, construction on the Margaret Hunt Hill Bridge began — the bridge is one of three Santiago Calatrava-designed bridges to be constructed as part of the project. Though official construction began almost a year and a half earlier, heavy construction did not start until June 2008. Completed in 2012, it connects Woodall Rodgers Freeway in downtown to Singleton Avenue in west Dallas. The conventional concrete pier-and-beam bridge with cosmetic arches and cable stays, supporting only the bike paths, cost $235 million; its total length is 570 meters (1,870 ft) with a main span of 365 meters (1,198 ft), and an apex-height of 122 meters (400 ft).

== Components ==
The Trinity River Corridor Project has been billed as a threefold venture: one that seeks to protect downtown Dallas against future flooding, to improve transportation through the congested downtown district, and to provide a place of relaxation and play for downtown residents who currently have limited outdoor recreational opportunities.

=== Flood protection ===
Although rare, downtown Dallas has suffered severe flooding and the Trinity River Project has enlisted local and government officials for advice on extending and improving the current levee system protecting the downtown area.

Current plans to improve the existing levees are part of what is known as the Dallas Floodway Extension project. They entail extending two existing levees and raising two others, all adjacent to the downtown Dallas area.

A second component of Dallas' efforts for increased flood protection involves the construction of a series of wetlands within the Trinity basin; these wetlands are being constructed to divert excess water away from the Trinity and absorb it outside the river channel, further reducing flood danger. Two sections of wetlands are under construction, an Upper Chain and a Lower Chain, with the latter completed in 2008.

=== Transportation ===
The Trinity Parkway, the most controversial portion of the project, was a proposed nine-mile (14 km) parkway located inside the river levees but above the floodplain; it was to provide an alternate route for Dallas residents and business travelers, and relieve intense Dallas highway traffic. Under the direction of Dallas officials, the North Texas Tollway Authority (NTTA), and the Texas Department of Transportation (TxDOT), the tollway was to have been constructed on the side of the Trinity closest to downtown. It would have accommodated four lanes of traffic, with some sections possibly increased to six lanes; the parkway was to cost approximately $1.8 billion.

=== Recreation ===
The Trinity River Project incorporates several new recreational developments aimed at improving quality of life for downtown Dallas residents and visitors. These include an Audubon center (opened in October 2008 at the site of an illegal landfill in South Dallas), a set of new trails for biking, hiking, and walking, parks, a standing wave, sports complexes, a horse park, and two manmade lakes.

These amenities are set to be added to various areas adjacent to downtown Dallas. The two lakes, named the Urban Lake and the Natural Lake by project officials, are set to be built in line with the Dallas cityscape so that cars crossing the aforementioned bridges pass over the lakes before entering downtown.

The project also contains a 40,000-acre (160 km^{2}) impact zone for economic development along the Trinity River. It will include retail, restaurants, residential developments, and offices, and also attract business into the city.

Currently there exists a broad section of developed land between the skyscrapers of downtown and the water's edge of the Trinity and the two lakes. Recently, Dallas city hall has put forth new zoning laws concerning this area; this new legislation redefines the types of structures that can be built in this area and extends downtown's sphere of influence with its model of highrise and high density construction out to the Trinity river.

== Trinity Parkway Toll Road Criticism ==
Although the original bond proposal was passed in 1998, work progressed slowly.

A proposed toll road garnered significant criticism from community activists. The 1998 bond proposal for the project allowed for a "parkway" within the project area. By 2007, Dallas business and political leaders had convinced the city to plan for a six- to eight-lane tollway that would link the suburban North Dallas area to southern-bound freeways with no entrance or exit ramps near the park. Following a requirement by the Army Corps of Engineers to move the road into the proposed park area, city councilwoman Angela Hunt and local activists argued that the road would cripple the planned development. Tollway supporters pointed to the planned roadway's ability to decongest the undersized "Mixmaster" interchange between I-35, I-30 and US 75, and argued that attempting to move the road would require a cost-prohibitive exercise of eminent domain. In a referendum sparked by Hunt, voters narrowly approved the construction of the toll road, thanks primarily to voters in the suburban north end of the city. After the referendum controversy continued, citizens began to change their minds and the city council finally cancelled the road project in August 2017.

== Progress ==
The Margaret Hunt Hill Bridge, the largest portion of the Trinity project started thus far, is currently complete and open to traffic connecting Spur 366 to Singleton Blvd. Completed at a cost of $120 million, it opened March 2012.

The Margaret McDermott Bridge, the second signature bridge, will replace the existing Interstate 30 bridge over the Trinity River. It was originally scheduled to begin construction in 2011, and be completed by 2014. However, in late 2011 funding for the bridge was moved to come from within the Project Pegasus initiative, with construction contracts to be awarded in mid-2012. The new plan features 'toned-down' elements of its original arch design, although Calatrava is still scheduled to perform the design work. As of April 2014, footings for the bridge's arches have been constructed, while steel fabrication has been taking place at Tampa Steel Erecting Company's plant in Florida. The general contractor, American Bridge, expected steel components to arrive on site in Dallas during the fall of 2014.

The Trinity River Audubon Center opened in mid-October 2008. The set of trails and parks included in the project have varying start and end dates: for most, construction has already begun or will begin this year and is set to be complete in 2009.

The standing wave will also begin construction in 2008 with a completion date of spring 2009. Both the sports complex and horse park are slated to break ground in 2009, with completion dates of 2010 and 2011, respectively. The two lakes are scheduled to begin construction in 2011 with an opening date of 2014. Due to funding issues, the completion dates on many of these projects have been pushed back.

The city of Dallas spent $4 million to build the standing wave whitewater course. The attraction opened in 2011 but was almost immediately deemed unsafe. The city spent another $2 million to remove the course in 2018.

In September 2023, updated plans for a Trinity River park were revealed. The plans marked a significant departure from the vision for the development. The park would be named after Dallas businessman Harold Simmons and would come with a $325 million price significantly higher than the Trinity River Conservancy's $150 million proposed project announced in 2015. In addition, where previous plans called for a nature-oriented park inside the river levees, the new proposed project would feature amenities set mostly outside the levees in West Dallas.

== See also ==
- Trammell Crow Park
