= List of places in Arkansas: D =

Arkansas State Seal

This list of current cities, towns, unincorporated communities, and other recognized places in the U.S. state of Arkansas whose name begins with the letter D. It also includes information on the number and names of counties in which the place lies, and its lower and upper zip code bounds, if applicable.

== Cities and Towns ==
Name of place	Number of counties	Principal county	Lower zip code	Upper zip code
Dabney	1	Van Buren County	72110	
Dacus	1	Crittenden County	72301	
Daggett	1	Woodruff County		
Dagmar	1	Monroe County		
Daisy	1	Pike County	71939	
Dalark	1	Dallas County	71923	
Daleville	1	Clark County		
Dallas	1	Polk County	71953	
Dalton	1	Randolph County	72455	
Damascus	1	Columbia County		
Damascus	2	Faulkner County	72039	
Damascus	2	Van Buren County	72039	
Dansby	1	Lee County		
Danville	1	Yell County	72833	
Darcy	1	Cleburne County	72067	
Dardanelle	1	Yell County	72834	
Datto	1	Clay County	72424	
Dave	1	Hempstead County		
Davenport	1	White County	72121	
Davidson	1	Crawford County		
Davis Ford	1	Howard County		
Davis Spur	1	Craighead County		
Day	1	Izard County	72513	
Dayton	1	Sebastian County	72940	
Dean	1	Carroll County		
Deane	1	Drew County		
Deaneyville	1	Hempstead County	71857	
De Ann	1	Hempstead County	71801	
Deans Market	1	Crawford County	72921	
Dean Springs	1	Crawford County	72921	
Deanyville	1	Hempstead County		
Dearman	1	Mississippi County		
Deberrie	1	Perry County	72126	
Decatur	1	Benton County	72722	
Deckerville	1	Poinsett County	72386	
Deep Elm	1	Chicot County	71653	
Deep Elm	1	Monroe County	72069	
Deer	1	Newton County	72628	
Deerfield	1	Desha County	72379	
Degelow	1	Craighead County		
Degray	1	Clark County	71923	
Delaney	1	Madison County	72727	
Delaplaine	1	Greene County	72425	
Delaware	1	Logan County	72835	
Delfore	1	Craighead County	72438	
Delight	1	Pike County	71940	
Delight Junction	1	Clark County		
Dell	1	Mississippi County	72426	
Delmar	1	Carroll County		
Delpro	1	Mississippi County		
Delta	1	Nevada County		
Deluce	1	Arkansas County	72042	
Democrat	1	St. Francis County		
Denmark	1	Jackson County	72020	
Dennard	1	Van Buren County	72629	
Denning	1	Franklin County	72821	
Dennison Heights	1	Independence County	72542	
Denny Ford	1	Madison County		
Denton	1	Lawrence County		
Denton Island	1	Craighead County		
Denver	1	Carroll County	72630	
Denwood	1	Mississippi County	72386	
De Queen	1	Sevier County	71832	
Dermott	1	Chicot County	71638	
De Roche	1	Hot Spring County		
Des Arc	1	Prairie County	72040	
Desha	1	Independence County	72527	
Detonti	1	Saline County	72011	
De Valls Bluff	1	Prairie County	72041	
Devalls Bluff	1	Prairie County		
DeView	1	Woodruff County		
Devue	1	Monroe County		
Dew Drop	1	Jefferson County		
Dewey	1	Chicot County		
Dewey	1	White County	72121	
Dewey Mill	1	Poinsett County		
De Witt	1	Arkansas County	72042	
Dexter	1	Jefferson County		
Dialion	1	Cleveland County	71665	
Diamond Cave	1	Newton County		
Diamond City	1	Boone County	72630	
Diamond Grove	1	Sebastian County		
Diamondhead	1	Hot Spring County	71913	
Dian	1	Nevada County	71857	
Diaz	1	Jackson County	72043	
Dickey Junction	1	Newton County		
Dicus	1	Lawrence County		
Dierks	1	Howard County	71833	
Dill	1	Cleburne County	72546	
Dillen	1	Johnson County	72854	
Dills Mills	1	Nevada County		
Dilworth	1	Sevier County		
Dimple	1	Mississippi County		
Dinsmore	1	Newton County		
Divide	1	Conway County	72025	
Dixie	1	Craighead County	72437	
Dixie	1	Crittenden County		
Dixie	1	Greene County		
Dixie	1	Pulaski County		
Dixie	1	Woodruff County	72006	
Dobell	1	Poinsett County		
Dobyville	1	Clark County		
Dodd City	1	Marion County		
Doddridge	1	Miller County	71834	
Dodge City	1	Union County		
Dodson	1	Columbia County	71753	
Dodsons Corner	1	St. Francis County	72335	
Dogpatch	1	Newton County	72648	
Dogwood	1	Grant County		
Dogwood	1	Mississippi County	72319	
Dollar Junction	1	Union County		
Dollarway	1	Jefferson County	71602	
Dolph	1	Izard County	72528	
Dolton	1	Jefferson County	71668	
Donaldson	1	Hot Spring County	71941	
Dongola	1	Searcy County	72650	
Doniphan	1	White County	72143	
Donnick	1	Poinsett County		
Dooley	1	Miller County		
Dora	1	Crawford County	72956	
Dorothy	1	Craighead County		
Dota	1	Independence County		
Dotson	1	Hempstead County		
Douglas	1	Lincoln County		
Douglasville	1	Pulaski County		
Dover	1	Pope County	72837	
Dowdy	1	Independence County	72524	
Doylestown	1	Jefferson County		
Drake Field	1	Washington County	72701	
Drakes Creek	1	Madison County	72740	
Drasco	1	Cleburne County	72530	
Driftwood	1	Lawrence County		
Driggs	1	Logan County	72943	
Dripping Springs	1	Crawford County		
Driver	1	Mississippi County	72329	
Drury Spur	1	Pulaski County		
Dryden	1	Craighead County	72401	
Dryfork	1	Carroll County	72740	
Dub	1	Poinsett County		
Dublin	1	Logan County	72863	
Duce	1	Desha County	71666	
Duckett Ford	1	Howard County		
Duff	1	Searcy County	72675	
Dugger	1	Boone County		
Dumas	1	Desha County	71639	
Dumas City	1	Union County		
Duncan	1	Monroe County		
Dunlap	1	Hempstead County		
Dunn	1	Randolph County		
Dunnington	1	Independence County	72564	
Dunwhite	1	Hempstead County		
Durham	1	Washington County	72701	
Durian	1	Hot Spring County	72104	
Dutch Mills	1	Washington County	72744	
Dutton	1	Madison County	72760	
Duvall	1	Cross County		
Dyer	1	Crawford County	72935	
Dyess	1	Mississippi County	72330	

== Townships ==
Name of place	Number of counties	Principal county	Lower zip code	Upper zip code
Dallas Township	1	Calhoun County		
Dalton Township	1	Randolph County		
Danley Township	1	Faulkner County		
Danville Township	1	Yell County		
Dardanelle Township	1	Yell County		
Darysaw Township	1	Grant County		
Davidson Township	1	Randolph County		
Davidson Township	1	Sharp County		
Davis Township	1	Grant County		
Davis Township	1	Van Buren County		
Days Creek Township	1	Miller County		
Dayton Township	1	Sebastian County		
Dean Springs Township	1	Crawford County		
De Bastrop Township	1	Ashley County		
Decatur Township	1	Benton County		
Dekalb Township	1	Grant County		
Delaware Township	1	Logan County		
Delmar Township	1	Carroll County		
Demun Township	1	Randolph County		
Denmark Township	1	White County		
Dent Township	1	Lawrence County		
Dent Township	1	Woodruff County		
Denton Township	1	Scott County		
Departee Township	1	Independence County		
De Roan Township	1	Hempstead County		
De Roche Township	1	Hot Spring County		
Des Arc Township	1	Prairie County		
Des Arc Township	1	White County		
De Soto Township	1	Marion County		
De View Township	1	Woodruff County		
Diamond Township	1	Sebastian County		
Dickerson Township	1	Johnson County		
Dickerson-Hill Township	1	Johnson County		
Dickson Township	1	Benton County		
Dillard Township	1	Howard County		
District No. 1 Township	1	Washington County		
District No. 2 Township	1	Washington County		
District No. 3 Township	1	Washington County		
District No. 4 Township	1	Washington County		
District No. 5 Township	1	Washington County		
District No. 6 Township	1	Washington County		
District No. 7 Township	1	Washington County		
District No. 8 Township	1	Washington County		
District No. 9 Township	1	Washington County		
District No. 10 Township	1	Washington County		
District No. 11 Township	1	Washington County		
District No. 12 Township	1	Washington County		
District No. 13 Township	1	Washington County		
Dixon Township	1	Monroe County		
Dobson Township	1	Poinsett County		
Dodd City Township	1	Marion County		
Dogpatch Township	1	Newton County		
Dogwood Township	1	White County		
Donald Township	1	Franklin County		
Dora Township	1	Crawford County		
Dortch Township	1	Lonoke County		
Dota Township	1	Independence County		
Dover Township	1	Hot Spring County		
Dover Township	1	Pope County		
Dowell Township	1	Lawrence County		
Driggs Township	1	Logan County		
Dry Fork Township	1	Carroll County		
Dry Run Township	1	Dallas County		
Drytown Township	1	Izard County		
Duckett Township	1	Howard County		
Dudley Lake Township	1	Jefferson County		
Duncan Township	1	Monroe County		
Dunnington Township	1	Jefferson County		
Durham Township	1	Washington County		
Dutch Creek Township	1	Yell County		
Dutch Mills Township	1	Washington County		
Duty Township	1	Lawrence County		
Dyer Township	1	Crawford County		
Dyer Township	1	Saline County		
Dyess Township	1	Mississippi County		
