= Arkansas Highway 237 =

State highway in Arkansas, United States

Highway 237

Route information
- Maintained by ArDOT
- Length: 25.91 mi (41.70 km)

Major junctions
- South end: AR 160 near Brightstar
- I-49 near Texarkana; US 71 in Texarkana; US 82 in Texarkana
- North end: US 67 / AR 296 in Texarkana

Location
- Country: United States
- State: Arkansas
- Counties: Miller

Highway system
- Arkansas Highway System; Interstate; US; State; Business; Spurs; Suffixed; Scenic; Heritage
← AR 236	→ AR 238

Arkansas Highway 237 (AR 237) is a north–south state highway in Miller County, Arkansas. The route runs 25.91 miles (41.70 km) from Highway 160 west of Brightstar north to U.S. Route 67 (US 67) in Texarkana.

== Route description ==
Highway 237 begins at Highway 160 west of Brightstar. The route runs north through the Sulphur River Wildlife Management Area to intersect Interstate 49 (I-49) south of Texarkana. Now entering the city, Highway 237 forms a brief concurrency with US 71. The route now continues due north as Rondo Road to intersect Highway 196 and US 82. Now approaching Texarkana Regional Airport, Highway 237 intersects Highway 296 just before terminating at US 67.

== Major intersections ==
The entire route is in Miller County.

Location	mi	km	Destinations	Notes
	0.00	0.00	AR 160 – Doddridge, Atlanta, TX	Southern terminus
	16.55	26.63	I-49	Exit 26 on I-49; former AR 549
Texarkana	18.64	30.00	US 71 north (East Street) – Texarkana	Southern end of US 71 concurrency
Texarkana	See US 71			
Texarkana	0.00	0.00	US 71 south (East Street) – Fouke	Northern end of US 71 concurrency
Texarkana	2.79	4.49	AR 196 (Genoa Road) – Texarkana, Genoa	
Texarkana	4.23	6.81	US 82 (9th Street) – Texarkana, Garland	
Texarkana	7.19	11.57	AR 296 east (Mandeville Road) – Hervey	Western terminus of AR 296
Texarkana	7.28	11.72	US 67 (Broad Street) – Texarkana, Fulton	Northern terminus
1.000 mi = 1.609 km; 1.000 km = 0.621 mi: Concurrency terminus

== See also ==
- List of state highways in Arkansas
