= List of places in Arkansas: I =

Arkansas State Seal

This list of current cities, towns, unincorporated communities, and other recognized places in the U.S. state of Arkansas whose name begins with the letter I. It also includes information on the number and names of counties in which the place lies, and its lower and upper zip code bounds, if applicable.

== Cities and Towns ==
| Name of place | Number of counties | Principal county | Lower zip code | Upper zip code |
|---|---|---|---|---|
| Ida | 1 | Cleburne County | 72546 | |
| Imboden | 1 | Lawrence County | 72434 | |
| Immanuel | 1 | Arkansas County | 72003 | |
| Imo | 1 | Searcy County | | |
| Index | 1 | Miller County | | |
| Indian | 1 | Chicot County | 71640 | |
| Indiana | 1 | Arkansas County | | |
| Indian Bay | 1 | Monroe County | | |
| Indiandale | 1 | Garland County | 71901 | |
| Indianhead Lake Estates | 1 | Pulaski County | 72116 | |
| Industrial | 1 | Pulaski County | 72209 | |
| Ingalls | 1 | Bradley County | 71647 | |
| Ingleside | 1 | Jackson County | 72112 | |
| Ingram | 1 | Randolph County | 72455 | |
| Ink | 1 | Polk County | 71953 | |
| Ione | 1 | Logan County | 72927 | |
| Ionia | 1 | Benton County | | |
| Irma | 1 | Nevada County | | |
| Iron Springs | 1 | Nevada County | | |
| Iron Springs | 1 | Pulaski County | | |
| Ironton | 1 | Pulaski County | 72204 | |
| Island | 1 | Sebastian County | | |
| Island Town | 1 | Jackson County | | |
| Iuka | 1 | Izard County | 72519 | |
| Ivan | 1 | Dallas County | 71748 | |
| Ivesville | 1 | Pulaski County | 72207 | |
| Ivy | 1 | Dallas County | 71725 | |

== Townships ==
| Name of place | Number of counties | Principal county | Lower zip code | Upper zip code |
|---|---|---|---|---|
| Illinois Township | 1 | Pope County | | |
| Illinois Township | 1 | Washington County | | |
| Independence Township | 1 | Baxter County | | |
| Independence Township | 1 | Lee County | | |
| Independence Township | 1 | Marion County | | |
| Indian Bayou Township | 1 | Lonoke County | | |
| Indian Rock Township | 1 | Van Buren County | | |
| Ingram Township | 1 | Randolph County | | |
| Ions Creek Township | 1 | Yell County | | |
| Isbell Township | 1 | Lonoke County | | |
| Island Township | 1 | Sebastian County | | |
| Ivy Township | 1 | Franklin County | | |
