= Arkansas Highway 134 =

State highway in Arkansas, United States

Highway 134

Route information
- Maintained by ArDOT
- Length: 20.27 mi (32.62 km)

Major junctions
- West end: US 71
- East end: US 82 in Garland

Location
- Country: United States
- State: Arkansas
- Counties: Miller

Highway system
- Arkansas Highway System; Interstate; US; State; Business; Spurs; Suffixed; Scenic; Heritage
← AR 133	→ AR 135

Arkansas Highway 134 (AR 134, Hwy. 134) is an east–west state highway in Miller County, Arkansas. The route of 20.27 miles (32.62 km) runs from US Route 71 (US 71) near Fouke to US 82 in Garland.

== Route description ==
AR 134 begins near Fouke and runs east underneath Highway 549, but does not have a junction with the route. The route runs north near the Red River and runs to Highway 196. Highway 134 turns east and runs to Garland, when it terminates at US 82.

== Former Choctaw route ==
State Road 134
- Location: Choctaw
- Existed: c. 1928–c. 1931

This route first appeared on the October 1928 state highway map from Highway 9 to Choctaw; the current Highway 134 also first appeared at this time. This road remained on the map through July 1931, but was removed on the following map.

== Major intersections ==
The entire route is in Miller County.

Location	mi	km	Destinations	Notes
	0.00	0.00	US 71 – Doddridge, Fouke	Western terminus
	16.43	26.44	AR 196 west – Texarkana	
Garland	20.27	32.62	US 82 – Texarkana, Lewisville, Stamps	Eastern terminus
1.000 mi = 1.609 km; 1.000 km = 0.621 mi

== See also ==
- List of state highways in Arkansas
