= Bright Star School District =

Defunct school district in Arkansas, United States

Bright Star School District was a school district headquartered in the Bright Star School in Doddridge, Arkansas.

== History ==
The Miller County district merged into the Bright Star district in 1969.

On July 1, 2004, the Bright Star School District was merged into the Fouke School District.
