= Paup, Arkansas =

- Unincorporated community
- Location within Arkansas Location within the United States
- Coordinates: 33°30′07″N 93°56′34″W
- Country: United States
- State: Arkansas
- County: Miller
- Elevation: 259 ft (79 m)
- Time zone: UTC-6 (Central (CST))
  - Summer (DST): UTC-5 (CDT)
- Area code: 870
- GNIS feature ID: 57154

Paup is an unincorporated community in Miller County, Arkansas, United States. Paup is located on U.S. Route 67, 7.8 miles (12.6 km) northeast of Texarkana.
