= Sylverino, Arkansas =

- Unincorporated community
- Location within Arkansas Location within the United States
- Coordinates: 33°19′00″N 93°56′16″W
- Country: United States
- State: Arkansas
- County: Miller
- Elevation: 299 ft (91 m)
- Time zone: UTC-6 (Central (CST))
  - Summer (DST): UTC-5 (CDT)
- Area code: 870
- GNIS feature ID: 63127

Sylverino is an unincorporated community in Miller County, Arkansas, United States. Sylverino is located on U.S. Route 71, 9.6 miles (15.4 km) southeast of Texarkana.
