= Arkansas Highway 196 =

American highway

Highway 196

Route information
- Maintained by ArDOT
- Length: 17.78 mi (28.61 km)
- Existed: June 23, 1965–present

Major junctions
- West end: US 71 in Texarkana
- I-49 in Texarkana
- East end: AR 134 near Garland City

Location
- Country: United States
- State: Arkansas
- Counties: Miller

Highway system
- Arkansas Highway System; Interstate; US; State; Business; Spurs; Suffixed; Scenic; Heritage
← AR 195	→ AR 197

Arkansas Highway 196 (AR 196) is an east–west state highway in Miller County in the Texarkana metropolitan area.

== Route description ==
Highway 196 begins at an intersection with U.S. Route 71 (US 71) in the College Hill area of Texarkana. The highway travels in an eastern direction along Division Street through a residential area before running through an industrial area near Tennessee Road. Highway 196 has a junction with Interstate 49 (I-49) and travels through less developed areas, intersecting Highway 237 in the Greenwich Village area of Texarkana. East of Greenwich Village, the route starts to travel in a southeast direction out of the city, passes the Creekwood subdivision, then turns south at an intersection with County Road 70. Highway 196 turns back in an eastern direction near Miller CR 422 and travels through the Genoa area before ending at an intersection with Highway 134 near Garland City.

== Junction list ==
The entire route is in Miller County.

Location	mi	km	Destinations	Notes
Texarkana	0.0	0.0	US 71 (East Street)	Western terminus
Texarkana	1.5– 1.7	2.4– 2.7	I-49 to I-30 – Shreveport	Exit 31 on I-49; former AR 245
Texarkana	3.1	5.0	AR 237 (Rondo Road) to US 71 / US 82	
	17.8	28.6	AR 134 – Garland City	Eastern terminus
1.000 mi = 1.609 km; 1.000 km = 0.621 mi

== History ==
The route was created by the Arkansas State Highway Commission on June 23, 1965. It began at Forest Avenue in Texarkana and ran east of Genoa. This erroneous description was rescinded on September 29, 1965, and the western terminus was modified to the current alignment. Highway 196 was extended east to Garland City on November 23, 1966.
