= Fouke School District =

School district in Arkansas, United States

Address
- 200 North Davis Street Fouke, Arkansas, 71837; United States

District information
- Type: Public
- Grades: PreK–12
- NCES District ID: 0506360

Students and staff
- Students: 1,029
- Teachers: 102.42
- Staff: 84.52
- Student–teacher ratio: 11.07

Other information
- Website: www.foukepanthers.org

Fouke School District 15 is a public school district based in Fouke, Miller County, Arkansas, United States. The district serves an average of 1,050 students in kindergarten through grade 12 and employs more than 150 faculty and staff at its three schools and district offices.

The school district encompasses 275.03 square miles (712.3 km^{2}) of land in Miller County and serves Fouke, Doddridge, and Bloomburg.

On July 1, 2004, the Bright Star School District was merged into the Fouke School District.

The band for the school, all of beginner, middle, and high school, has won district wide competitions and is often in the first and second divisions in competitions.

== Schools ==
- Fouke High School, serving grades 9 through 12.
- Paulette Smith Middle School, serving grades 6 through 8.
- Fouke Elementary School, serving prekindergarten through grade 5.
