= Pleasant Hill, Miller County, Arkansas =

Pleasant Hill, Arkansas
- Unincorporated community
- Location within Arkansas Location within the United States
- Coordinates: 33°19′10″N 94°01′39″W
- Country: United States
- State: Arkansas
- County: Miller
- Elevation: 259 ft (79 m)
- Time zone: UTC-6 (Central (CST))
  - Summer (DST): UTC-5 (CDT)
- Area code: 870
- GNIS feature ID: 63116

Pleasant Hill is an unincorporated community in Miller County, Arkansas, United States. Pleasant Hill is located near the Texas state line, 7.3 miles (11.7 km) south of Texarkana.
