= List of lakes of Miller County, Arkansas =

There are at least 63 named lakes and reservoirs in Miller County, Arkansas.

== Lakes ==
- Adams Cut-off Lake, 33°35′05″N 093°51′35″W, el. 253 feet (77 m)
- Alligator Lake, 33°15′53″N 094°01′32″W, el. 200 feet (61 m)
- Candler Lake, 33°18′34″N 093°42′19″W, el. 217 feet (66 m)
- Clark Lake, 33°30′03″N 093°57′01″W, el. 259 feet (79 m)
- Clear Lake, 33°30′25″N 093°55′53″W, el. 256 feet (78 m)
- Cypress City Lake, 33°22′24″N 093°42′51″W, el. 213 feet (65 m)
- Cypress Lake, 33°20′01″N 093°42′33″W, el. 220 feet (67 m)
- Elliott Slough, 33°16′01″N 094°01′03″W, el. 200 feet (61 m)
- First Old River Lake, 33°29′55″N 093°46′04″W, el. 233 feet (71 m)
- Fish Lake, 33°16′39″N 093°47′04″W, el. 210 feet (64 m)
- Ford Slough, 33°15′19″N 094°00′15″W, el. 200 feet (61 m)
- Goose Lake, 33°12′07″N 093°45′05″W, el. 210 feet (64 m)
- Haley Lake, 33°10′01″N 093°46′50″W, el. 200 feet (61 m)
- Harper Lake, 33°32′52″N 093°52′56″W, el. 259 feet (79 m)
- Keller Lake, 33°18′06″N 093°43′06″W, el. 213 feet (65 m)
- Kennedy Lake, 33°07′43″N 093°53′19″W, el. 203 feet (62 m)
- Kuykendall Lake, 33°33′21″N 093°49′58″W, el. 246 feet (75 m)
- Little Pond, 33°12′13″N 093°56′54″W, el. 194 feet (59 m)
- Long Slough, 33°14′54″N 094°01′19″W, el. 200 feet (61 m)
- Mathis Slough, 33°16′32″N 094°02′00″W, el. 200 feet (61 m)
- Mercer Lake, 33°08′49″N 093°54′10″W, el. 197 feet (60 m)
- Moes Slough, 33°15′49″N 094°00′34″W, el. 200 feet (61 m)
- Nineteen hundred and forty Cut-off Lake, 33°31′24″N 093°44′39″W, el. 226 feet (69 m)
- Palmer Lake, 33°02′33″N 093°50′27″W, el. 197 feet (60 m)
- Pinhook Lake, 33°15′36″N 094°01′44″W, el. 200 feet (61 m)
- Red Lake, 33°27′41″N 093°44′57″W, el. 230 feet (70 m)
- Scott Lake, 33°34′08″N 093°50′01″W, el. 236 feet (72 m)
- Second Old River Lake, 33°28′36″N 093°44′54″W, el. 226 feet (69 m)
- Snaggy Lake, 33°15′40″N 094°01′02″W, el. 200 feet (61 m)
- Snake Lake, 33°15′15″N 093°59′06″W, el. 197 feet (60 m)
- Tobe Lake, 33°34′39″N 093°52′53″W, el. 253 feet (77 m)
- Whites Camp Lake, 33°17′10″N 094°00′17″W, el. 243 feet (74 m)
- Willow Lake, 33°32′51″N 093°49′09″W, el. 239 feet (73 m)
- Winham Lake, 33°32′42″N 094°01′41″W, el. 266 feet (81 m)

== Reservoirs ==
- Arkla Lake, 33°01′24″N 093°58′17″W, el. 253 feet (77 m)
- Boyce Lake, 33°23′28″N 093°55′54″W, el. 312 feet (95 m)
- Browns Lake, 33°17′12″N 094°00′43″W, el. 236 feet (72 m)
- Buford Lake, 33°29′01″N 093°57′20″W, el. 302 feet (92 m)
- Coca Cola Lake, 33°24′08″N 093°55′50″W, el. 308 feet (94 m)
- Country Club, 33°24′17″N 094°01′20″W, el. 315 feet (96 m)
- Cox Lake, 33°29′28″N 093°57′02″W, el. 279 feet (85 m)
- Crabtree Lake, 33°14′55″N 093°57′24″W, el. 203 feet (62 m)
- Davis Lake, 33°19′34″N 093°58′41″W, el. 246 feet (75 m)
- Davis Lake Number Two, 33°19′48″N 093°59′08″W, el. 233 feet (71 m)
- Eason Lake, 33°02′44″N 093°53′35″W, el. 213 feet (65 m)
- Gill Lake, 33°26′31″N 093°55′33″W, el. 295 feet (90 m)
- Hensley Lake, 33°20′27″N 093°47′03″W, el. 243 feet (74 m)
- Jones Lake, 33°04′15″N 093°54′54″W, el. 256 feet (78 m)
- Lower Lake, 33°18′12″N 093°59′31″W, el. 220 feet (67 m)
- Lower Moore Lake, 33°26′59″N 093°55′42″W, el. 259 feet (79 m)
- Mitchell Lake, 33°28′38″N 094°02′17″W, el. 335 feet (102 m)
- Old Bitty Lake, 33°24′32″N 093°56′34″W, el. 344 feet (105 m)
- Paradise Lake, 33°20′59″N 093°59′05″W, el. 272 feet (83 m)
- Robinson Lake, 33°29′30″N 093°59′01″W, el. 302 feet (92 m)
- Smith Lake, 33°26′24″N 093°59′18″W, el. 367 feet (112 m)
- Smith Lake, 33°14′15″N 094°00′38″W, el. 207 feet (63 m)
- State Line Lake, 33°29′15″N 094°02′31″W, el. 308 feet (94 m)
- Upper Lake, 33°18′07″N 093°59′42″W, el. 246 feet (75 m)
- Upper Moore Lake, 33°26′55″N 093°56′12″W, el. 269 feet (82 m)
- Wadley Lake, 33°29′32″N 093°59′06″W, el. 282 feet (86 m)
- Westmoreland Lake, 33°07′06″N 093°55′14″W, el. 256 feet (78 m)
- Williams Lake, 33°29′27″N 093°59′17″W, el. 285 feet (87 m)
- Wooten Lake, 33°25′23″N 093°57′27″W, el. 384 feet (117 m)

== See also ==
- List of lakes in Arkansas
