= Ferguson Crossroads, Arkansas =

- Unincorporated community
- Location within Arkansas Location within the United States
- Coordinates: 33°19′58″N 93°57′12″W
- Country: United States
- State: Arkansas
- County: Miller
- Elevation: 322 ft (98 m)
- Time zone: UTC-6 (Central (CST))
  - Summer (DST): UTC-5 (CDT)
- Area code: 870
- GNIS feature ID: 76918

Ferguson Crossroads (also known as Ferguson) is an unincorporated community in Miller County, Arkansas, United States. Ferguson Crossroads is located on U.S. Route 71, 8.2 miles (13.2 km) southeast of Texarkana.
