= Fouke High School =

Location
- 403 Panther Drive; Fouke, Arkansas 71837; United States; 33°15′47″N 93°53′1″W

Information
- Type: Public secondary
- School district: Fouke School District
- NCES District ID: 0506360
- CEEB code: 040840
- NCES School ID: 050636000380
- Principal: Amanda Whitehead
- Faculty: 51.49 (on FTE basis)
- Grades: 9–12
- Student to teacher ratio: 6.51
- Campus type: Closed
- Colors: Purple and gold
- Song: Hail, hail to our Panthers
- Fight song: We’re going to fight, fight, fight For ole Fouke High
- Athletics conference: 3A 6 (football), 3A 7 (basketball) (2012–14)
- Mascot: Panther
- Team name: Fouke Panthers
- Website: www.foukepanthers.org

Fouke High School is a secondary school in Fouke, Arkansas, United States. The school is the only secondary school serving grades 9 through 12. It is one of three public high schools in Miller County and the sole high school in the Fouke School District. For the 2010–11 school year, Fouke High School supported more than 300 students and employed more than 23 educators on a full time equivalent basis.

== Academics ==
The assumed course of study follows the Smart Core curriculum developed by the Arkansas Department of Education (ADE), which requires students to complete at least 22 units to graduate. Students complete regular courses and exams and may self-select Advanced Placement (AP) coursework and exams with the opportunity for college credit. The school is accredited by the ADE.

Students who complete either the Smart Core or Core curriculum and maintain a 2.75 GPA qualify for the Honor Seal on the graduation diploma.

== Athletics ==
The Fouke High School mascot is the Panther with purple and gold serving as its school colors.

For 2012–14, the Fouke Panthers compete in the 3A Classification in the 3A Region 6 (football) and 3A Region 7 (basketball) conferences as administered by the Arkansas Activities Association (AAA). The Panthers participate in football, baseball, softball, and track (boys/girls).

- Baseball: The baseball won a state baseball championship in spring 1999.

A trap shooting team competes as a member of the Arkansas Youth Sports Program (AYSSP) South Region administered by the Arkansas Game and Fish Commission.
