= Index, Arkansas =

- Unincorporated community
- Location within Arkansas Location within the United States
- Coordinates: 33°32′49″N 94°02′31″W
- Country: United States
- State: Arkansas
- County: Miller
- Elevation: 276 ft (84 m)
- Time zone: UTC-6 (Central (CST))
  - Summer (DST): UTC-5 (CDT)
- Area code: 870
- GNIS feature ID: 57966

Index is an unincorporated community in Miller County, Arkansas, United States. Index is located on U.S routes 59 and 71 in the northwest corner of the county, 8.4 miles (13.5 km) north of Texarkana.
