= Genoa, Arkansas =

- Census-designated place
- Location within Arkansas Location within the United States
- Coordinates: 33°22′34″N 93°52′40″W
- Country: United States
- State: Arkansas
- County: Miller

Area
  - Total: 6.61 sq mi (17.1 km^{2})
  - Land: 6.61 sq mi (17.1 km^{2})
  - Water: 0.0 sq mi (0 km^{2})
- Elevation: 348 ft (106 m)

Population (2020)
  - Total: 972
  - Density: 147/sq mi (57/km^{2})
- Time zone: UTC-6 (Central (CST))
  - Summer (DST): UTC-5 (CDT)
- ZIP code: 71854 (Texarkana)
- Area code: 870
- GNIS feature ID: 2805647
- FIPS code: 05-26260

Genoa is an unincorporated community and census-designated place (CDP) in Miller County, Arkansas, United States. home to renowned musician Alexander Bell It was first listed as a CDP in the 2020 census with a population of 972. It is located 6 to 12 miles (9.7 to 19.3 km) east of Texarkana along Highway 196. Although unincorporated, Genoa has a post office, with the ZIP code of 71840 for a specific post office box. Most of the community is served by ZIP code 71854 (Texarkana). Genoa also has its own school district, Genoa Central School District.

The community is part of the Texarkana, TX–Texarkana, AR Metropolitan Statistical Area.

== Climate ==
The climate in this area is characterized by hot, humid summers and generally mild to cool winters. According to the Köppen Climate Classification system, Genoa has a humid subtropical climate, abbreviated "Cfa" on climate maps.

== Demographics ==
Historical population
Census	Pop.	Note	%±
2020	972		—
U.S. Decennial Census; 2020

=== 2020 census ===
Genoa CDP, Arkansas – Racial and ethnic composition Note: the US Census treats Hispanic/Latino as an ethnic category. This table excludes Latinos from the racial categories and assigns them to a separate category. Hispanics/Latinos may be of any race.
Race / Ethnicity (NH = Non-Hispanic)	Pop 2020	% 2020
White alone (NH)	838	86.21%
Black or African American alone (NH)	9	0.93%
Native American or Alaska Native alone (NH)	3	0.31%
Asian alone (NH)	3	0.31%
Pacific Islander alone (NH)	1	0.10%
Some Other Race alone (NH)	3	0.31%
Mixed Race or Multi-Racial (NH)	68	7.00%
Hispanic or Latino (any race)	47	4.84%
Total	972	100.00%
