= Dooley, Arkansas =

Unincorporated community

- Unincorporated community
- Location within Arkansas Location within the United States
- Coordinates: 33°28′07″N 93°51′27″W
- Country: United States
- State: Arkansas
- County: Miller
- Elevation: 253 ft (77 m)
- Time zone: UTC-6 (Central (CST))
  - Summer (DST): UTC-5 (CDT)
- Area code: 870
- GNIS feature ID: 56994

Dooley is an unincorporated community in Miller County, Arkansas, United States. Dooley is located on Arkansas Highway 296, 11.1 miles (17.9 km) north-northeast of Texarkana.
