= Detonti, Arkansas =

- Unincorporated community
- Location within Arkansas Location within the United States
- Coordinates: 34°29′50″N 92°30′32″W
- Country: United States
- State: Arkansas
- County: Saline
- Elevation: 354 ft (108 m)
- Time zone: UTC-6 (Central (CST))
  - Summer (DST): UTC-5 (CDT)
- Area code: 501
- GNIS feature ID: 76788

Detonti (also De Tonti) is an unincorporated community in Saline County, Arkansas, United States.
