= Fouke, Arkansas =

- City
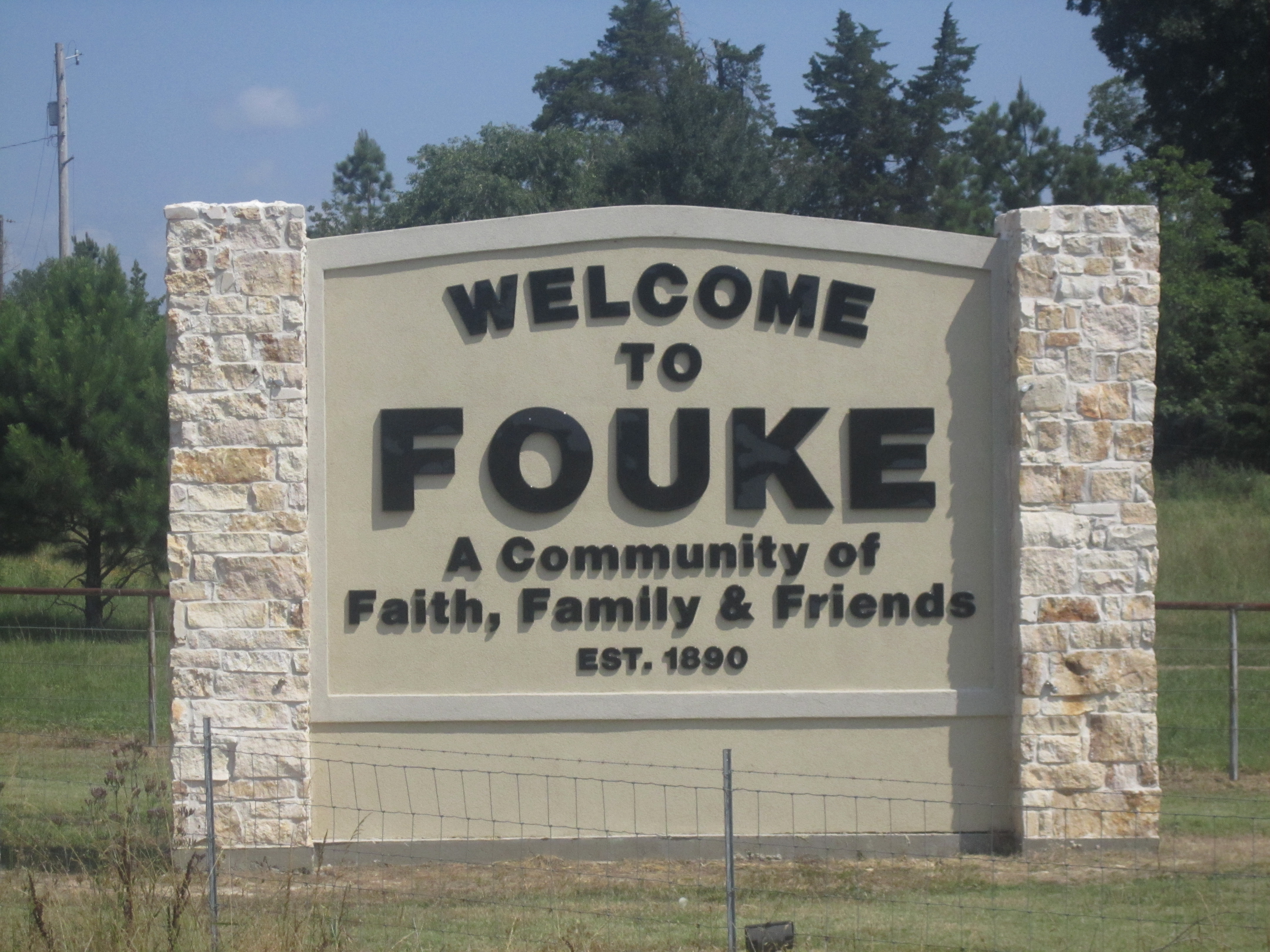

- Location in Miller County, Arkansas
- Coordinates: 33°15′39″N 93°52′45″W
- Country: United States
- State: Arkansas
- County: Miller

Area
  - Total: 1.36 sq mi (3.51 km^{2})
  - Land: 1.36 sq mi (3.51 km^{2})
  - Water: 0 sq mi (0.00 km^{2})
- Elevation: 315 ft (96 m)

Population (2020)
  - Total: 808
  - Estimate (2025): 810 ▲
  - Density: 596/sq mi (230.1/km^{2})
- Time zone: UTC-6 (Central (CST))
  - Summer (DST): UTC-5 (CDT)
- ZIP code: 71837
- Area code: 870
- FIPS code: 05-24640
- GNIS feature ID: 2403652
- Website: cityoffouke.com

Fouke /ˈfaʊk/ is a city in Miller County, Arkansas, United States. It is part of the Texarkana, Texas - Texarkana, Arkansas Metropolitan Statistical Area. The population was 810 in 2024

== Geography ==
Fouke is located in central Miller County, along U.S. Highway 71. Interstate 49 passes just to the west of the city limits and serves the city with two exits. Fouke is 15 miles (24 km) southeast of Texarkana and about 55 miles (89 km) north of Shreveport, Louisiana, by either highway. The Red River passes less than 10 miles (16 km) to the east and south of Fouke.

According to the United States Census Bureau, the city has a total area of 1.4 square miles (3.6 km^{2}), all land.

== History ==
The area around Fouke had long been inhabited by the Native American Caddo people, prior to European colonization of the Americas. Caddo tribes and European explorers traded pelts, honey, beeswax, flour, tobacco, blankets, guns, and other items. After the Louisiana Purchase, the United States established the Sulphur Fork Factory (trading post) where the Sulphur River enters the Red River. In the years following Arkansas statehood, settlers began flowing steadily into the area and the Caddo population was greatly diminished.

In 1889, Seventh Day Baptist minister James Franklin Shaw and his followers were seeking an area to establish a new colony. In 1890, they chose a site along the Texarkana, Shreveport and Natchez Railroad, where a small timber line ended at Fouke's Sawmill. The streets were named for prominent, nationally known Baptists, and upon advertising the area with the offer of reasonably priced land, affordable lumber, and free railroad passage, pioneers traveled to the area from as far away as Idaho, Illinois, and West Virginia.

James H. Fouke, a Presbyterian entrepreneur, lumberman, and railroad executive, helped them establish their colony, and in 1902 he donated land for a school. The city of Fouke was named in his honor.

By the early 1920s, the farming and timber industries had brought people of many faiths to the community. A new Texas and Pacific Railroad depot was constructed in 1906, and the community was incorporated in 1911. Population growth increased during the 1920s oil boom, and in 1928 construction of U.S. Route 71 further increased Fouke's employment opportunities.

During the Prohibition era of 1920–1936, Fouke suffered violent deaths of many men in relation to the illegal trafficking of liquor. Interstate commerce was not well coordinated during that time, which made Fouke's location attractive to those who would commit crimes and then cross the adjoining border(s).

Since the 1920s, Fouke has had a reputation as a sundown town.

The Fouke State Bank was chartered in 1914, but it went broke during the Great Depression, and job losses in the community caused many to accept work as part of Depression-era programs such as the Civilian Conservation Corps and the Works Progress Administration. It was not until World War II that large numbers of the citizens found employment at the newly established Lone Star Army Ammunition Plant and Red River Army Depot, which were located just west of Texarkana.

Since its incorporation, the city of Fouke has seen many improvements to its infrastructure. Dirt and gravel streets were paved in 1958. A new city hall, jail, and fire station were constructed in 1962. A new "Deep-Well" water system was completed in 1966, and the city's sewer system was completed in 1988.

In 1972, Fouke received national attention when Charles B. Pierce produced a movie called The Legend of Boggy Creek. The movie chronicled the alleged existence of a large, hairy, ape-like creature called the "Fouke Monster". A number of local citizens were cast, and the movie used area wetlands, rivers, and creeks for its location.

In 2001 Fouke celebrated the grand opening of the Fouke Community Center, and the grand opening of the Miller County Historical and Family Museum was celebrated in 2003.

In 2010, Fouke citizens dedicated the Veterans Memorial Park. The memorial covers two-thirds of a city block. It is a perpetually flagged and lighted monument that contains a growing list of veterans' names and military histories.

In 2011, local groups such as the Citizens for a Better Community raised funds to provide improvements that include "Welcome" signs on Highway 71 at the north and south ends of the city, along with various beautification and community service projects. They purchased one of Fouke's historic homes with a plan to renovate and restore it to create an events center and community library. By that time, the Fouke School District had become the city's largest employer, with more than 1,000 students and more than 165 employees.

In 2013, Fouke began the Boggy Creek Festival to promote the local area, bring together the community, and to share information and humor about the "Fouke Monster".

== Demographics ==
Historical population
Census	Pop.	Note	%±
1910	246		—
1920	319		29.7%
1930	363		13.8%
1940	368		1.4%
1950	336		−8.7%
1960	394		17.3%
1970	506		28.4%
1980	619		22.3%
1990	635		2.6%
2000	813		28.0%
2010	815		0.2%
2020	808		−0.9%
2025 (est.)	810	▲	0.2%
U.S. Decennial Census

=== 2020 census ===
Fouke racial composition
Race	Number	Percentage
White (non-Hispanic)	734	90.8%
Black or African American (non-Hispanic)	1	0.1%
Native American	4	0.5%
Other/Mixed	51	6.3%
Hispanic or Latino	18	2.2%

As of the 2020 United States census, there were 808 people, 281 households, and 204 families residing in the city.

=== 2000 census ===
As of the census of 2000, there were 700 people, 291 households, and 220 families residing in the city. The population density was 777.8 inhabitants per square mile (300.3/km^{2}). There were 336 housing units at an average density of 321.1 per square mile (124.0/km^{2}). The racial makeup of the city was 95.5% White, 0.3% Black or African American, 2.5% Native American, 0.6% from other races, and 1.2% from two or more races. 1.7% of the population were Hispanic or Latino of any race.

There were 291 households, out of which 47.4% had children under the age of 18 living with them, 57.7% were married couples living together, 13.4% had a female householder with no husband present, and 24.1% were non-families. 21.3% of all households were made up of individuals, and 10.3% had someone living alone who was 65 years of age or older. The average household size was 2.80 and the average family size was 3.26.

In the city, the population was spread out, with 33.8% under the age of 18, 11.8% from 18 to 24, 28.5% from 25 to 44, 16.7% from 45 to 64, and 9.2% who were 65 years of age or older. The median age was 27 years. For every 100 females, there were 95.2 males. For every 100 females age 18 and over, there were 91.8 males.

The median income for a household in the city was $25,192, and the median income for a family was $35,089. Males had a median income of $26,938 versus $20,375 for females. The per capita income for the city was $11,075. About 18.0% of families and 17.5% of the population were below the poverty line, including 17.4% of those under age 18 and 26.7% of those age 65 or over.

== Education ==
Public education for early childhood, elementary and secondary school students is primarily provided by the Fouke School District, which leads to graduation from Fouke High School.

== Media ==
Fouke is served by media from Texarkana, and Shreveport.

== Infrastructure ==
=== Highways ===
- Interstate 49
- U.S. Route 71

== Local history ==
- Historic Scoggins House Community Event Center & Library: Library, genealogy, and local historical research and event space

== Image gallery ==
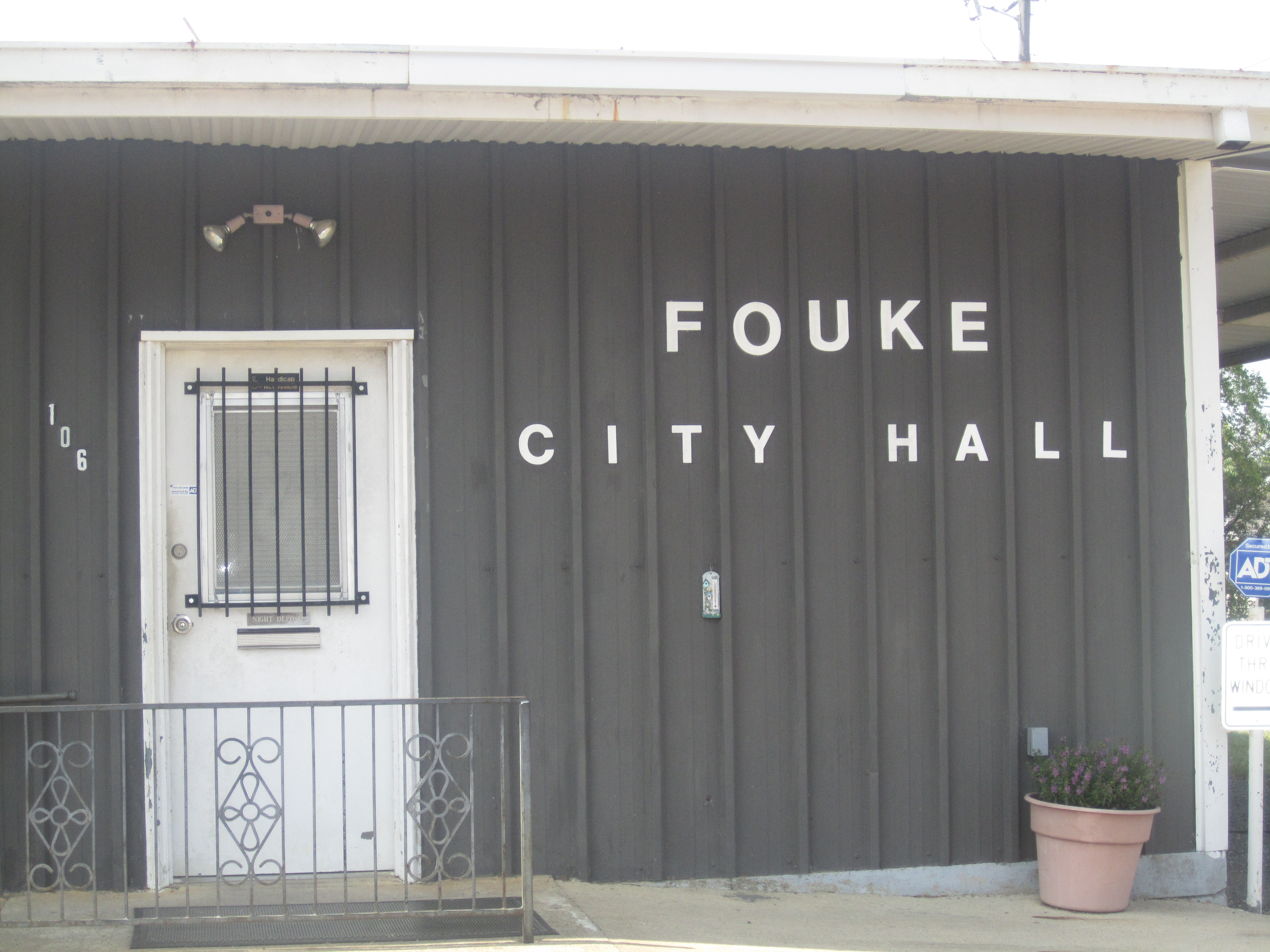
City Hall in Fouke

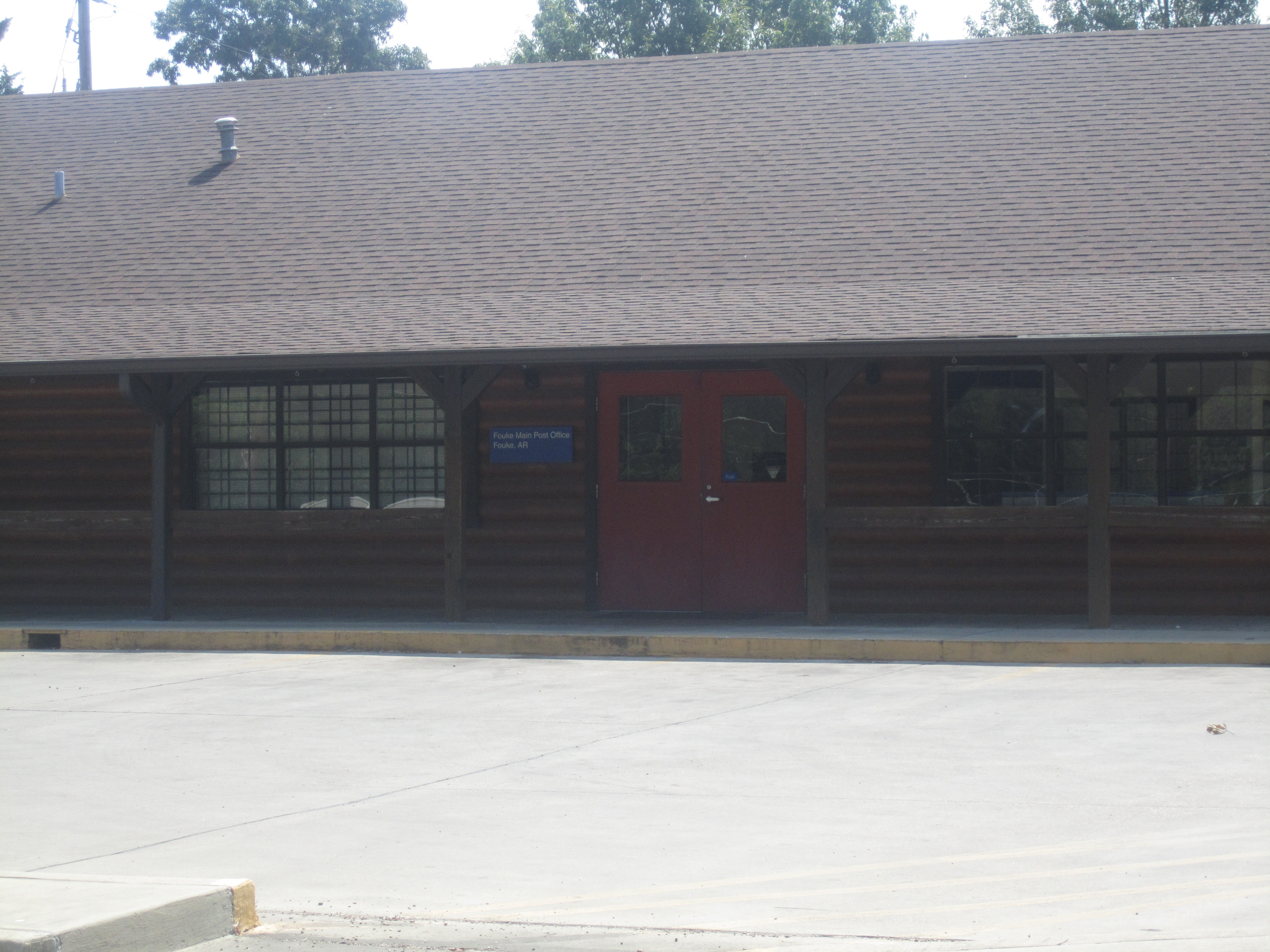
The U.S. Post Office in Fouke is of log cabin design.

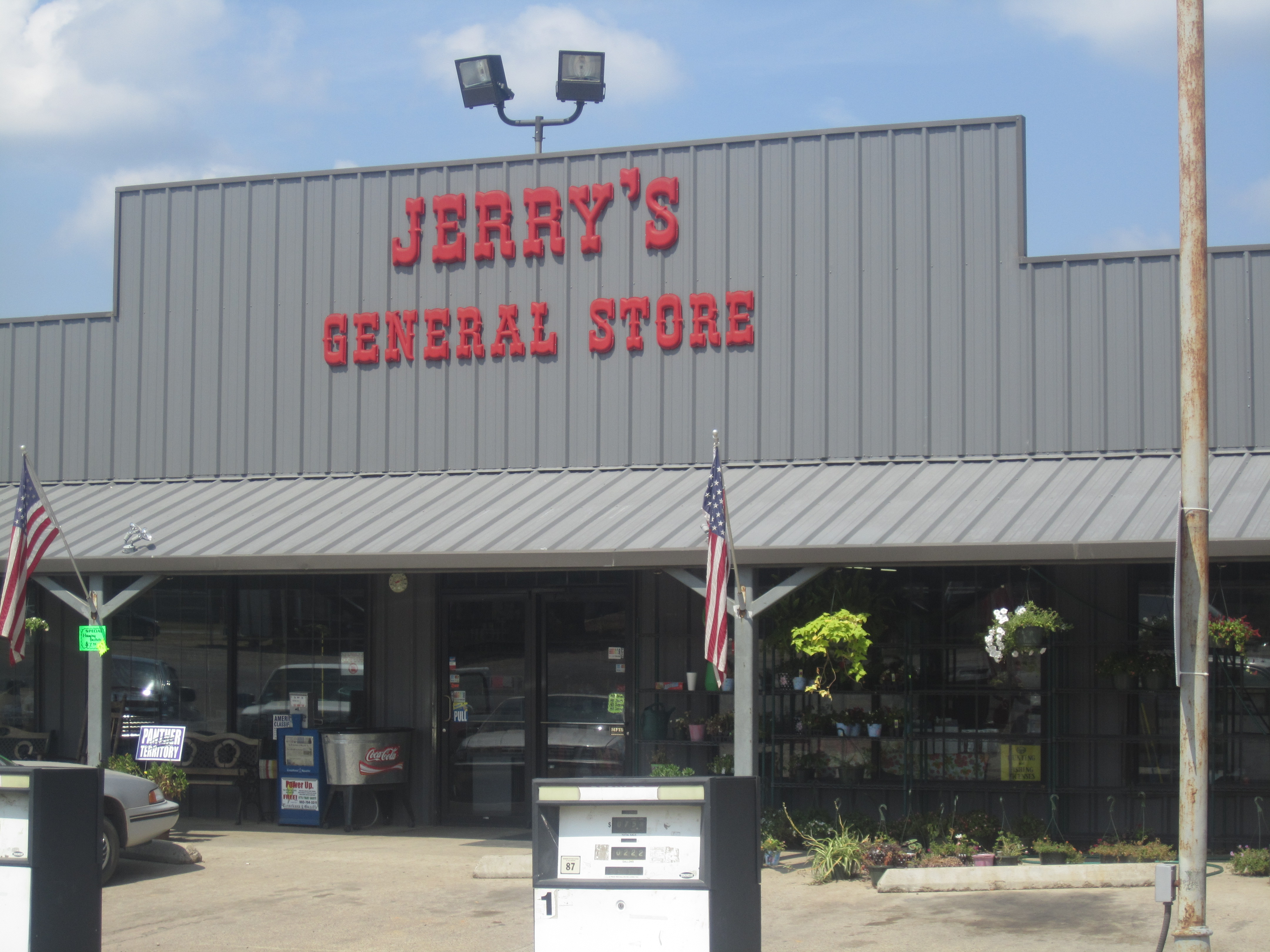
Jerry's General Store in Fouke

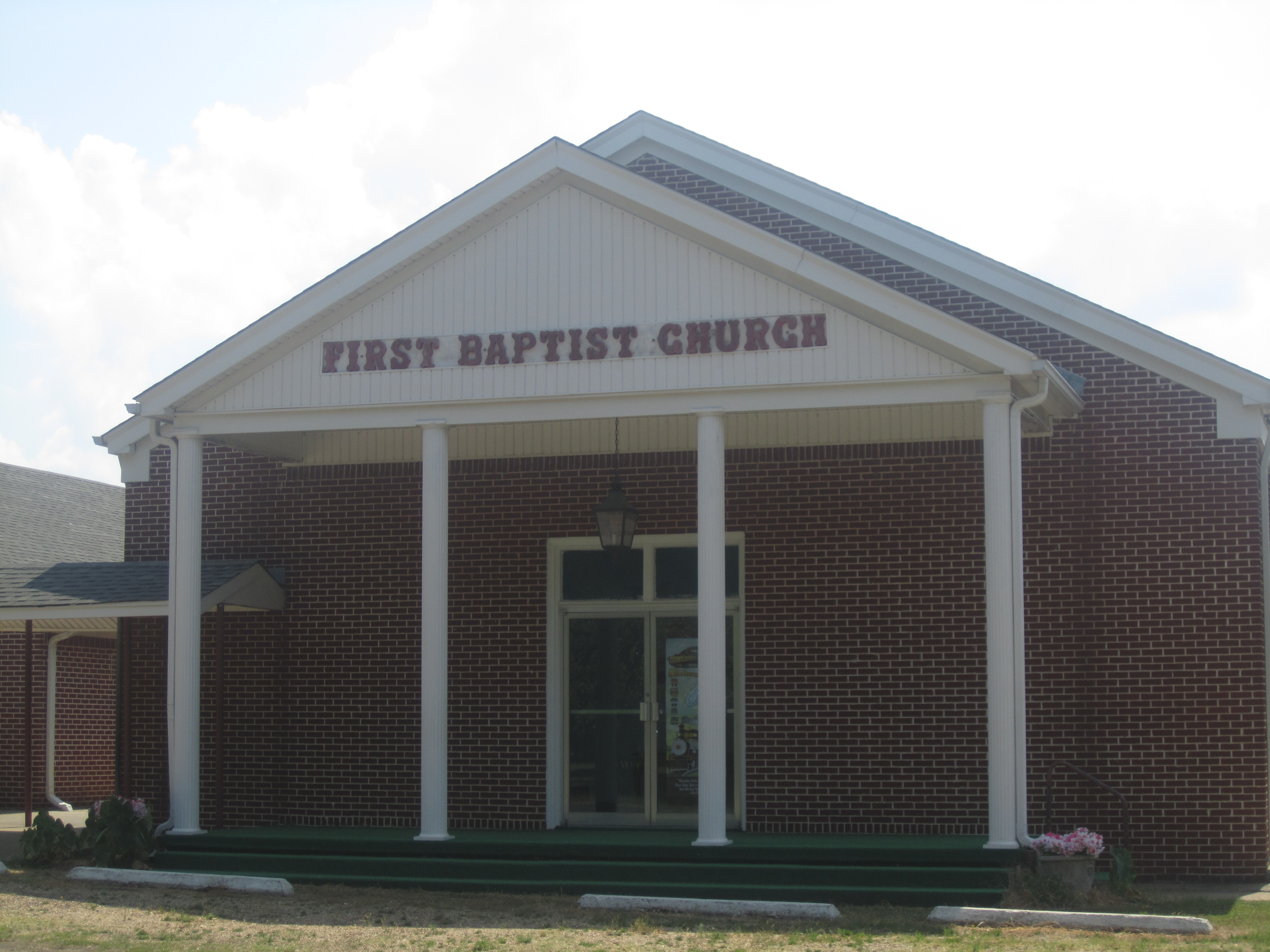
First Baptist Church of Fouke

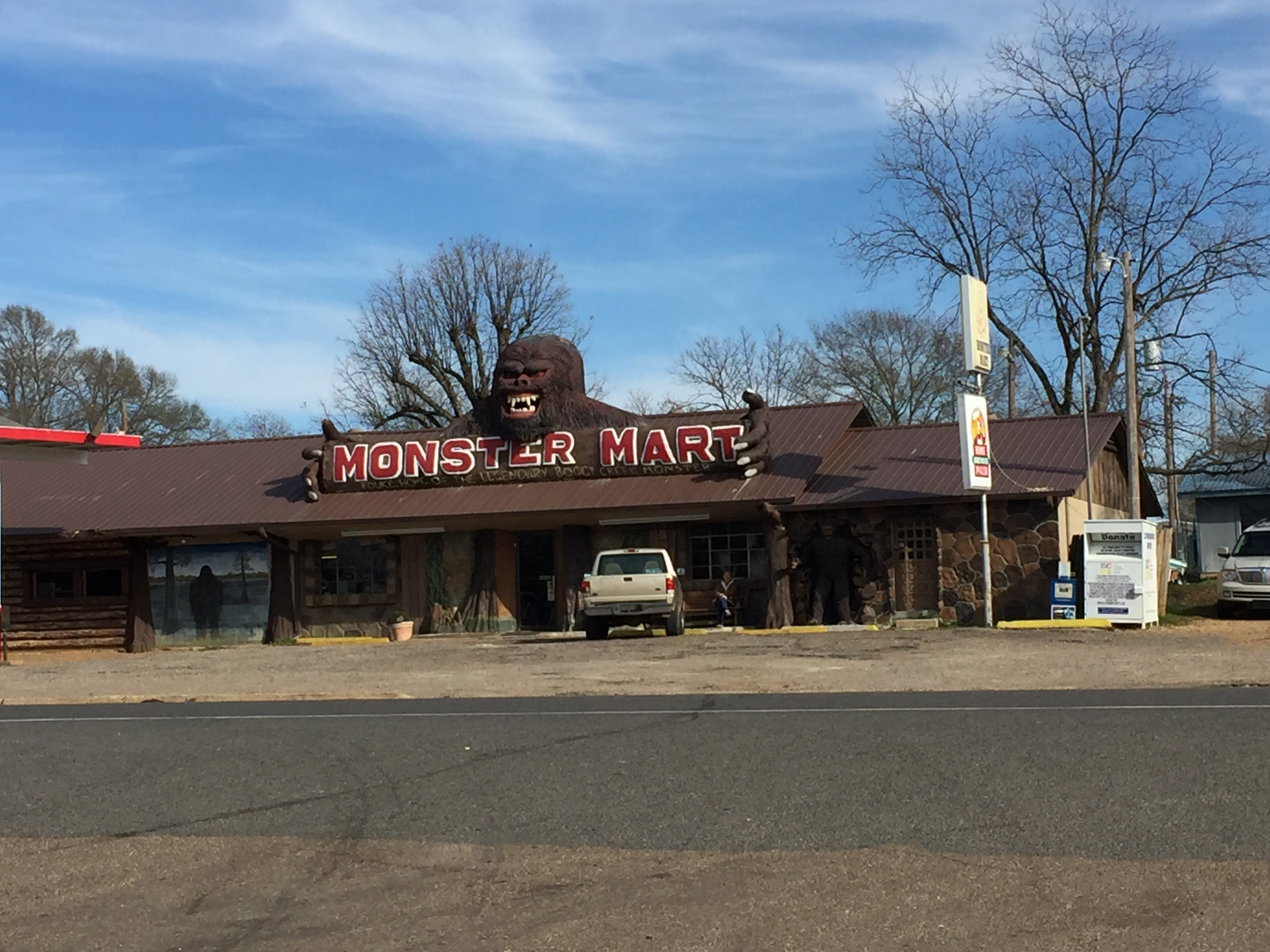
Monster Mart in Fouke

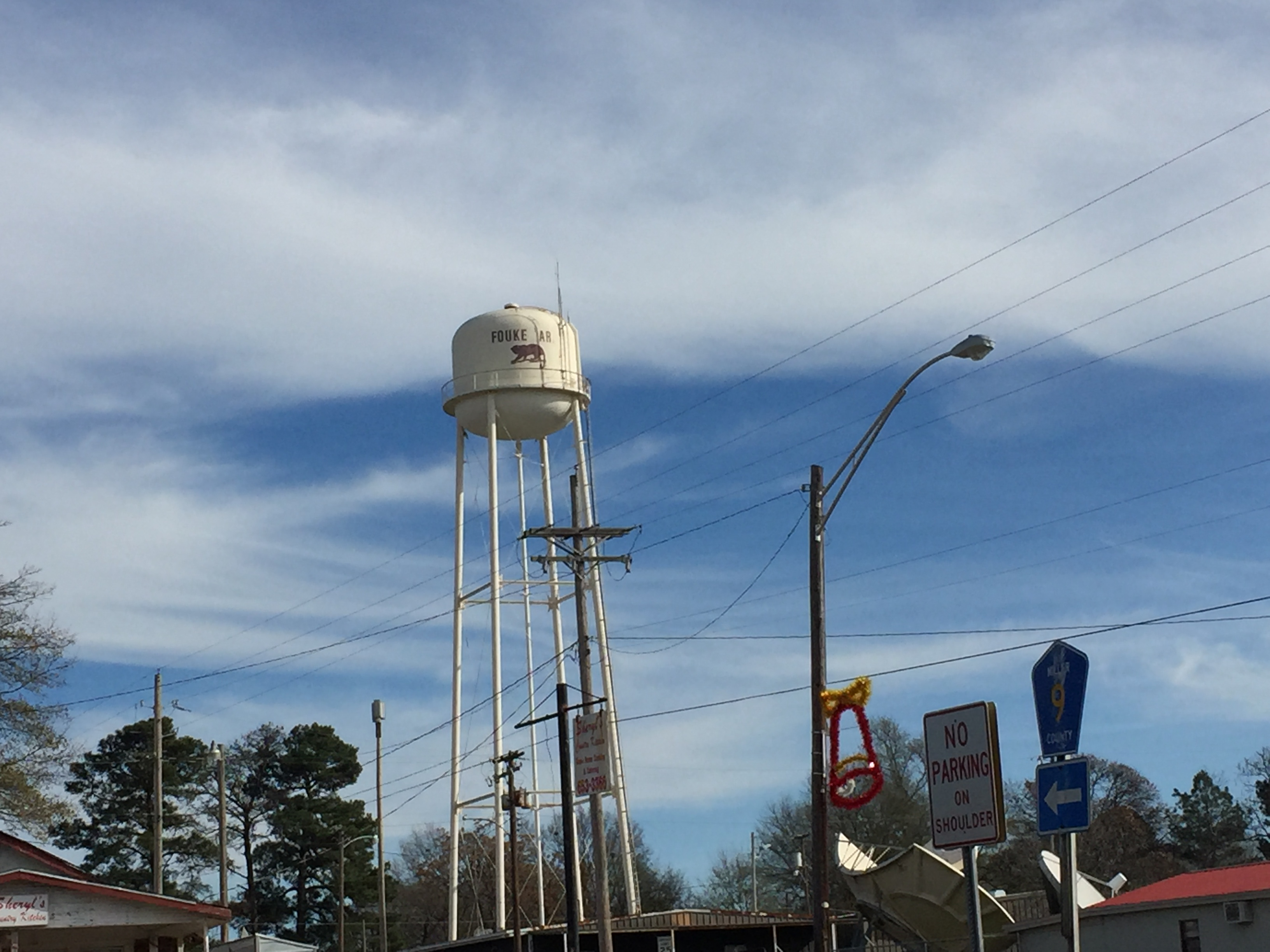
Water tower in Fouke
