= Doddridge, Arkansas =

Unincorporated community in Arkansas, US

Coordinates: 33°05′30″N 93°54′30″W

Doddridge is an unincorporated community in southern Miller County, Arkansas, United States, approximately five miles north of the Louisiana border. Doddridge is located at the junction of Arkansas Highway 160 and U.S. Route 71, and I-49 (former Highway 549) passes through the area, connecting it to Texarkana and Louisiana, as well as the confluence of the Sulphur and Red rivers. Although unincorporated, Doddridge has a post office, with the ZIP code of 71834.

The community is part of the Texarkana, TX–Texarakana, AR Metropolitan Statistical Area.

It is within the Fouke School District. It was previously served by the Bright Star School District, which operated the Bright Star School in Doddridge. On July 1, 2004, the Bright Star School District was merged into the Fouke School District.
