= Miller County, Arkansas =

County in Arkansas, United States

- County
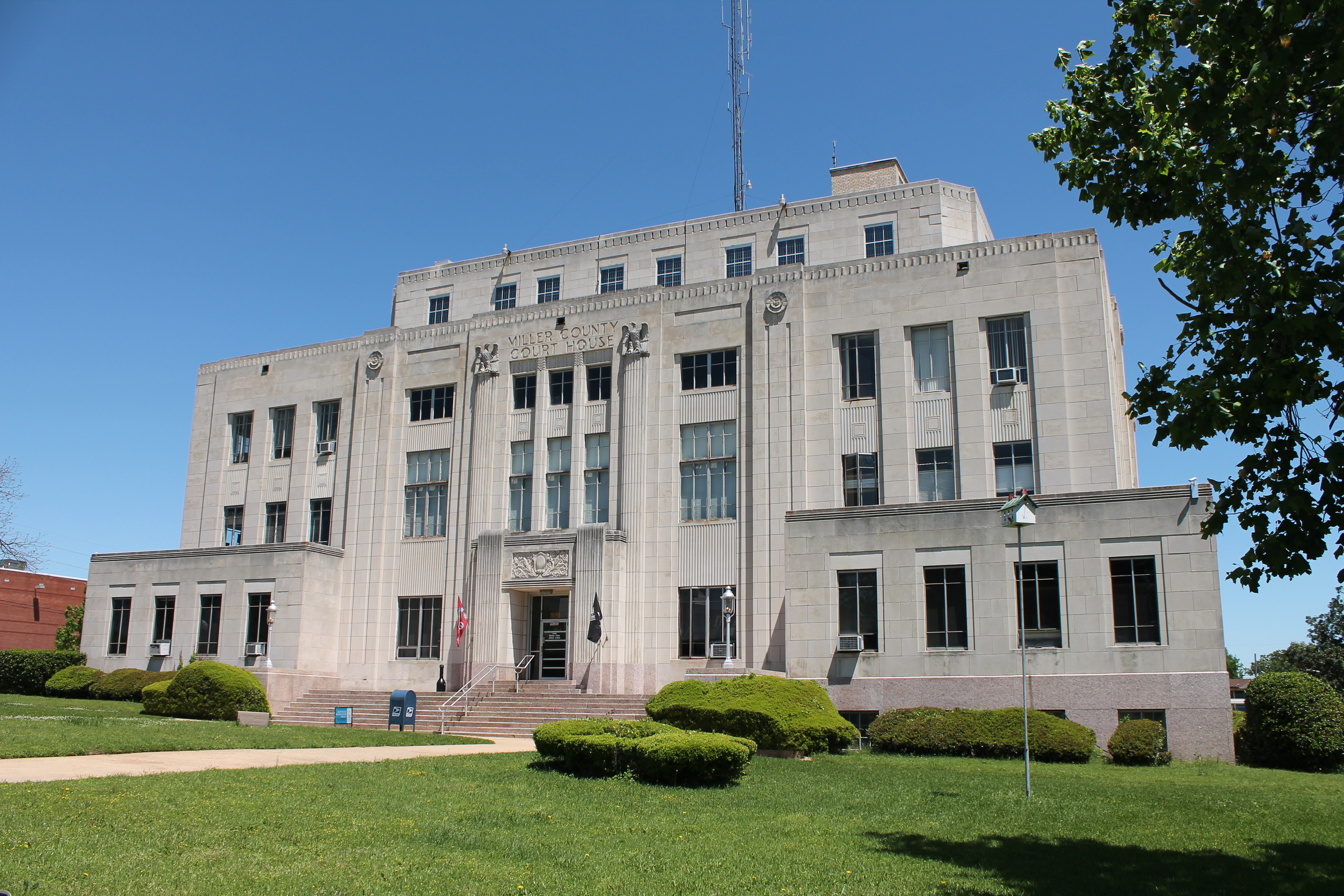
- Miller County Courthouse in Texarkana

- Location within the U.S. state of Arkansas
- Coordinates: 33°19′40″N 93°52′38″W
- Country: United States
- State: Arkansas
- Founded: April 1, 1820; recreated December 22, 1874, following abolishment in 1838
- Named for: James Miller
- Seat: Texarkana
- Largest city: Texarkana

Area
  - Total: 637.48 sq mi (1,651.1 km^{2})
  - Land: 623.98 sq mi (1,616.1 km^{2})
  - Water: 13.5 sq mi (35 km^{2}) 2.1%

Population (2020)
  - Total: 42,600
  - Estimate (2025): 42,357 ▼
  - Density: 68.3/sq mi (26.4/km^{2})
- Time zone: UTC−6 (Central)
  - Summer (DST): UTC−5 (CDT)
- Congressional district: 4th
- Website: www.millercountyar.gov

Miller County is a county located in the southwestern corner of the U.S. state of Arkansas. As of the 2020 census, the population was 42,600. The county seat is Texarkana. Miller County is part of the Texarkana, TX-AR, Metropolitan Statistical Area.

== History ==
When first formed, Miller County was Arkansas's sixth county, established on April 1, 1820, and named for James Miller, the first governor of the Arkansas Territory. Additionally, Miller County was the first of the state's counties to be formed upon the creation of the Arkansas Territory. The first five — Arkansas, Lawrence, Clark, Hempstead and Pulaski — were formed during Arkansas's days as part of the Missouri Territory. This county was abolished in 1838.

During the Reconstruction era, it was organized again on December 22, 1874, from a portion of neighboring Lafayette County.

External videos
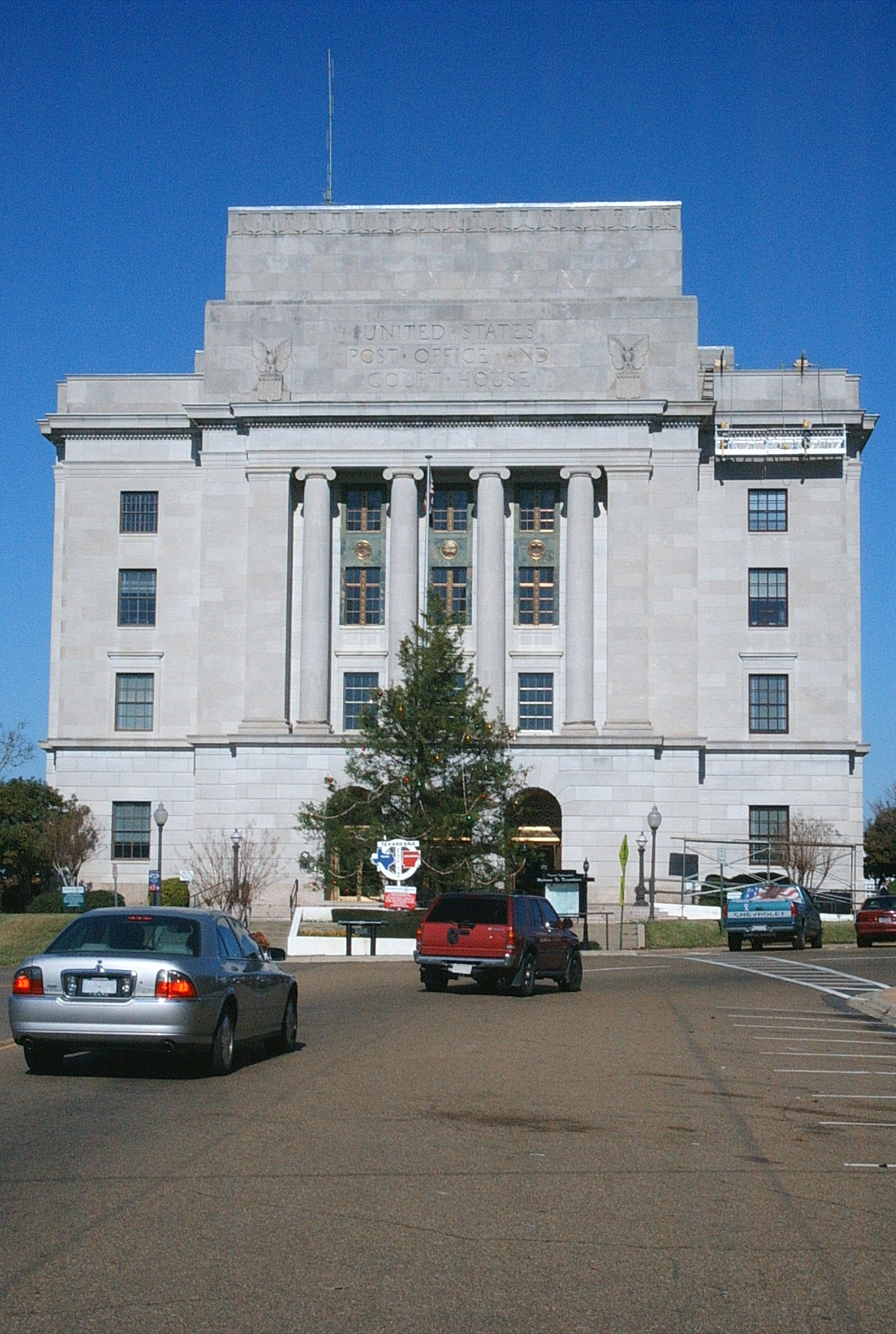
- Texarkana's National Register of Historical Places, (5:49)
- Texarkana's National Register of Historical Places Part 2, (7:11), City of Texarkana, Arkansas

When created in 1820, Miller County included most of the current Miller County, as well as several present-day Texas counties. (Note: Bowie, Red River, Lamar, Fannin, Cass, Morris, Titus, Franklin, Hopkins, Delta, and Hunt) In 1831 the county seat was located what is the current day Clarksville, Texas.

When Arkansas achieved statehood the same year as Texas declared itself an independent republic in 1836, a dispute arose over their common border, with the area in Miller County having representation in both the Arkansas legislature and the Texas congress. In 1837 and 1838, Texas organized Red River and Fannin counties, respectively, in the area. Arkansas attempted to counter by making it a misdemeanor for Miller County residents to hold office in Texas, and then by establishing a county court in Fannin. The attempts were ultimately unsuccessful. In 1845 Texas agreed to annexation by the United States, settling the boundary between Texas and Arkansas. As much of Miller County was lost to Texas, the county was dissolved, with the remaining territory returning to Lafayette County.

The modern Miller County was re-created in 1874 from the parts of Lafayette County lying west and south of the Red River.

== Geography ==
Miller County is located in the southwest corner of Arkansas in the Piney Woods, a temperate coniferous forest. The forests of pine trees initially formed a logging and silviculture industry, though many fields have been cleared from the forest to grow rice, soybeans, corn, and vegetables. The county is also within the Ark-La-Tex region, sharing a tripoint with Texas and Louisiana. The Ark-La-Tex is an economic region anchored by Shreveport, Louisiana, Tyler, Texas, Longview, Texas, and Texarkana. The Red River serves as the northern and eastern boundary of the county, though the watercourse has shifted since the county's reestablishment in 1874. The original Red River continues to serve as the county line between Little River, Hempstead, and Lafayette counties in Arkansas. According to the U.S. Census Bureau, Miller County has a total area of 637.48 square miles (1,651.1 km^{2}), of which 623.98 square miles (1,616.1 km^{2}) is land and 13.50 square miles (35.0 km^{2}) (2.1%) is water.

The county is located approximately 143 miles (230 km) southwest of Little Rock, 73 miles (117 km) north of Shreveport, Louisiana, and 204 miles (328 km) east of the Dallas–Fort Worth metroplex (DFW) in Texas. (Note: Mileages from Miller County to Little Rock, Shreveport, and DFW are based on highway miles using county seat Texarkana, Arkansas for Miller County.) Miller County is surrounded by three Arkansas counties: Little River County to the north, Hempstead County to the northeast, Lafayette County to the east; two Louisiana parishes: Bossier Parish to the southeast and Caddo Parish, to the south; and two Texas counties to the west: Cass and Bowie.

=== Ecology ===
Miller County is within the South Central Plains Level III ecoregion designated by the Environmental Protection Agency. Within the region, the county contains parts of four different Level IV ecoregions. Throughout the South Central Plains, forests are mostly swamp - southern floodplain forest, unlike the oak–hickory–pine forest of higher, better drained forests in adjacent eco-regions.

Along the north and eastern county boundary, the Red River Bottomlands follows the Red River. This eco-region contains floodplains, low terraces, oxbow lakes, meander scars, backswamps, natural levees, and the meandering Red River. Natural vegetation is southern floodplain forest unlike the oak–hickory– pine forest of higher, better drained compared to adjacent forests. However, the region has widely been cleared and drained for agriculture. The Red River is almost continuously turbid; suspended sediment concentrations are usually much higher than in the Saline River or Ouachita River due to land cover, land use, and upstream lithology differences.

South of Texarkana, the Floodplains and Low Terraces eco-region follows the Sulphur River. It contains frequently flooded forested wetlands, natural levees, swales, oxbow lakes, and meander scars. Longitudinal channel gradients are low and are less than in the Ouachita Mountains. North of the low terraces, a small strip of Pleistocene Fluvial Terraces ecoregion contains level, poorly-drained, periodically wet soils underlain by Pleistocene unconsolidated terrace deposits. Loblolly pine and oaks are common and are adapted to the prevailing hydroxeric regime; pastureland and hayland are less extensive. A vertical sequence of terraces occurs. The lowest terrace is nearly flat, clayey, and has extensive hardwood wetlands. Higher terraces become progressively older and more dissected; they are dominated by pine flatwoods, pine savanna, or prairie; flatwood wetlands are less extensive than on the lowest terrace. The mid-level terrace is veneered with windblown silt deposits (loess). Streams tend to be mildly acidic and stained by organic matter. They have more suspended solids, greater turbidity, and higher hardness values than the Tertiary Uplands.

=== Hydrology ===
Miller County is within the Red River watershed. The historic channel of the Red River defines the northern and eastern boundary of Miller County. The Sulphur River, McKinney Bayou, and Bois D'Arc Creek are also important water courses in the county; all tributary to the Red River. Swamps and bayous along the Sulphur River drain much of the western part of Miller County. A levee in the eastern part of Miller County delineates the border between the McKinney Bayou watershed, with everything east of the levee within the Red River floodplain. Areas within the levee are frequently subject to inundation by the Red, including a town evacuation of Garland City in 2015.

=== Protected areas ===
Miller County contains two protected areas: the Sandhills Natural Area owned by the Arkansas Natural Heritage Commission (ANHC), and the Sulphur River Wildlife Management Areas (WMA), owned by the Arkansas Game and Fish Commission (AGFC). The Sandhills Natural Area preserves 274 acres (111 ha) of undisturbed sandhill vegetation along rolling hills and sandy soils. It is a home to at least 40 rare species of plants, the most of any ANHC Natural Area. The Sulphur River WMA preserves 16,520 acres (6,690 ha) of bottomland hardwood forest, cypress breaks, oxbow lakes, and bayous along the Red River Valley. Established in the 1950s, the area is open to birding, camping, hunting, fishing, and hiking. Within the WMA, 500 acres (200 ha) is maintained as the Henry Moore Waterfowl Rest Area.

== Demographics ==
Historical population
Census	Pop.	Note	%±
1830	356		—
1880	9,919		—
1890	14,714		48.3%
1900	17,558		19.3%
1910	19,555		11.4%
1920	24,021		22.8%
1930	30,586		27.3%
1940	31,874		4.2%
1950	32,614		2.3%
1960	31,686		−2.8%
1970	33,385		5.4%
1980	37,766		13.1%
1990	38,467		1.9%
2000	40,443		5.1%
2010	43,462		7.5%
2020	42,600		−2.0%
2025 (est.)	42,357	▼	−0.6%
U.S. Decennial Census; 1790–1960 1900–1990; 1990–2000 2010

=== 2020 census ===
As of the 2020 census, the county had a population of 42,600. The median age was 39.9 years. 23.2% of residents were under the age of 18 and 17.3% of residents were 65 years of age or older. For every 100 females there were 95.9 males, and for every 100 females age 18 and over there were 93.1 males age 18 and over.

The racial makeup of the county was 65.8% White, 25.8% Black or African American, 0.7% American Indian and Alaska Native, 0.5% Asian, <0.1% Native Hawaiian and Pacific Islander, 1.7% from some other race, and 5.5% from two or more races. Hispanic or Latino residents of any race comprised 3.7% of the population.

60.1% of residents lived in urban areas, while 39.9% lived in rural areas.

There were 17,068 households in the county, of which 30.8% had children under the age of 18 living in them. Of all households, 42.3% were married-couple households, 19.0% were households with a male householder and no spouse or partner present, and 32.3% were households with a female householder and no spouse or partner present. About 29.1% of all households were made up of individuals and 11.5% had someone living alone who was 65 years of age or older.

There were 19,779 housing units, of which 13.7% were vacant. Among occupied housing units, 62.3% were owner-occupied and 37.7% were renter-occupied. The homeowner vacancy rate was 1.7% and the rental vacancy rate was 11.5%.

=== 2010 census ===
Racial/Ethnic Makeup of Miller County treating Hispanics as a Separate Category (2010)
1. White Non-Hispanic (70.6%)
2. Black Non-Hispanic (24.4%)
3. Native American Non-Hispanic (0.60%)
4. Asian Non-Hispanic (0.50%)
5. Pacific Islander Non-Hispanic (0.00%)
6. Other Non-Hispanic (0.10%)
7. Two or more races Non-Hispanic (1.40%)
8. Hispanic Any Race (2.40%)

As of the 2010 census, there were 43,462 people, 17,219 households, and 11,685 families residing in the county. The population density was 68 people per square mile (26 people/km^{2}). There were 19,281 housing units at an average density of 30 units per square mile (12 units/km^{2}). The racial makeup of the county was 71.6% White, 24.5% Black or African American, 0.7% Native American, 0.5% Asian, 0.04% Pacific Islander, 1.0% from other races, and 1.7% from two or more races. 2.4% of the population were Hispanic or Latino of any race.

There were 11,685 households, out of which 34.00% had children under the age of 18 living with them, 45.9% were married couples living together, 17.0% had a female householder with no husband present, and 32.1% were non-families. 27.4% of all households were made up of individuals, and 9.8% had someone living alone who was 65 years of age or older. The average household size was 2.44 and the average family size was 2.95.

In the county, the population was spread out, with 24.3% under the age of 18, 9.1% from 18 to 24, 26.6% from 25 to 44, 26.1% from 45 to 64, and 13.8% who were 65 years of age or older. The median age was 37.2 years. For every 100 females there were 97.0 males. For every 100 females age 18 and over, there were 93.6 males.

The median income for a household in the county was $40,307, and the median income for a family was $47,960. Males had a median income of $41,556 versus $30,417 for females. The per capita income for the county was $19,654. About 14.1% of families and 18.1% of the population were below the poverty line, including 29.1% of those under age 18 and 12.9% of those age 65 or over.

=== 2000 census ===
As of the 2000 census, there were 40,443 people, 15,637 households, and 11,086 families residing in the county. The population density was 65 people per square mile (25 people/km^{2}). There were 17,727 housing units at an average density of 28 units per square mile (11 units/km^{2}). The racial makeup of the county was 74.02% White, 22.99% Black or African American, 0.63% Native American, 0.37% Asian, 0.02% Pacific Islander, 0.54% from other races, and 1.43% from two or more races. 1.58% of the population were Hispanic or Latino of any race.

There were 15,637 households, out of which 34.00% had children under the age of 18 living with them, 50.90% were married couples living together, 16.00% had a female householder with no husband present, and 29.10% were non-families. 25.60% of all households were made up of individuals, and 10.70% had someone living alone who was 65 years of age or older. The average household size was 2.52 and the average family size was 3.02.

In the county, the population was spread out, with 26.50% under the age of 18, 9.70% from 18 to 24, 28.60% from 25 to 44, 22.10% from 45 to 64, and 13.10% who were 65 years of age or older. The median age was 35 years. For every 100 females there were 95.00 males. For every 100 females age 18 and over, there were 90.10 males.

The median income for a household in the county was $30,951, and the median income for a family was $36,665. Males had a median income of $33,080 versus $21,376 for females. The per capita income for the county was $16,444. About 15.40% of families and 19.30% of the population were below the poverty line, including 27.90% of those under age 18 and 16.50% of those age 65 or over.

== Human resources ==
=== Education ===
Educational attainment in Miller County is typical for a rural Arkansas county, with a 2016 study finding 85.5% of Miller County residents over age 25 held a high school degree or higher, in line with Arkansas and national averages of 85.2% and 87.0%, respectively. Miller County's proportion of population holding a bachelor's degree or higher is 14.5%, significantly below the state average of 21.5% and national average of 30.3%.

==== Primary and secondary education ====
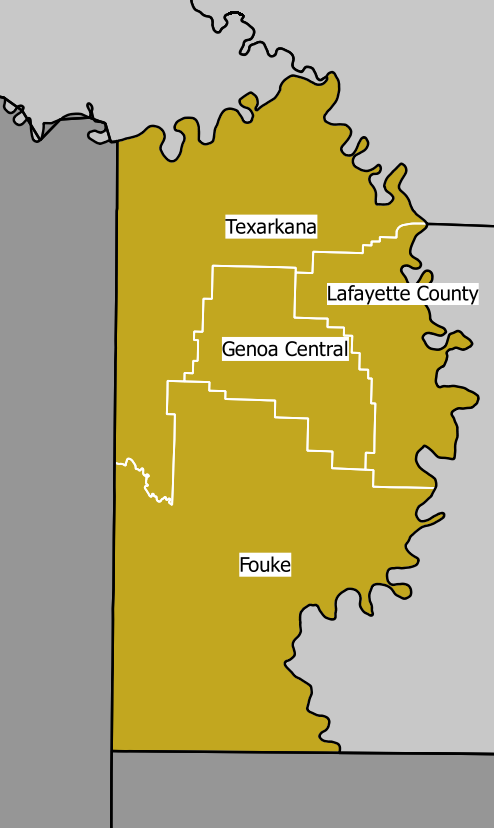
Public school district boundaries in Miller County as of July 2016

Public school districts serving sections of Miller County:

- Fouke School District
- Genoa Central School District
- Lafayette County School District
- Texarkana Arkansas School District (TASD)

Three of those districts are based in Miller County; TASD is the largest school district in Miller County, with the Fouke District serving approximately the southern half of the county, and the Genoa District serving a small area around Genoa between the two larger districts. Successful completion of the curriculum of these schools leads to graduation from Arkansas High School, Fouke High School, or Genoa Central High School respectively. All three high schools offer Advanced Placement (AP) courses and are accredited by the Arkansas Department of Education (ADE). TASD also offers graduation from the Washington Academy Charter School, an alternative public charter school, and Texarkana Area Vocational Center. Arkansas HS offers concurrent credit agreements with nearby University of Arkansas Community College at Hope (UACCH) Texarkana Campus, and is the only school in the county accredited by AdvancED.

Students in the northeast part of Miller County around Garland outside the three Miller County-based districts are within the Lafayette County School District.

==== Higher education ====
Miller County contains one institution of higher education, the Texarkana campus of University of Arkansas Community College at Hope, a public community college based in Hope, Arkansas. Texarkana, Texas contains Texas A&M University–Texarkana, a public four-year university with a high percentage of students from Arkansas, and Texarkana College, a community college. Other higher education institutions in the region include Cossatot Community College in De Queen, Arkansas, Southern Arkansas University in Magnolia, and several institutions in the vicinity of Shreveport, Louisiana.

==== Libraries ====
The Texarkana Public Library is located at 600 West 3rd Street. TPL offers books, e-books, media, reference, youth, business and genealogy services. In Fouke, the Ann & Dewey Fowler Community Library is located at 305 N Snell Street in a restored Victorian house.

=== Public health ===
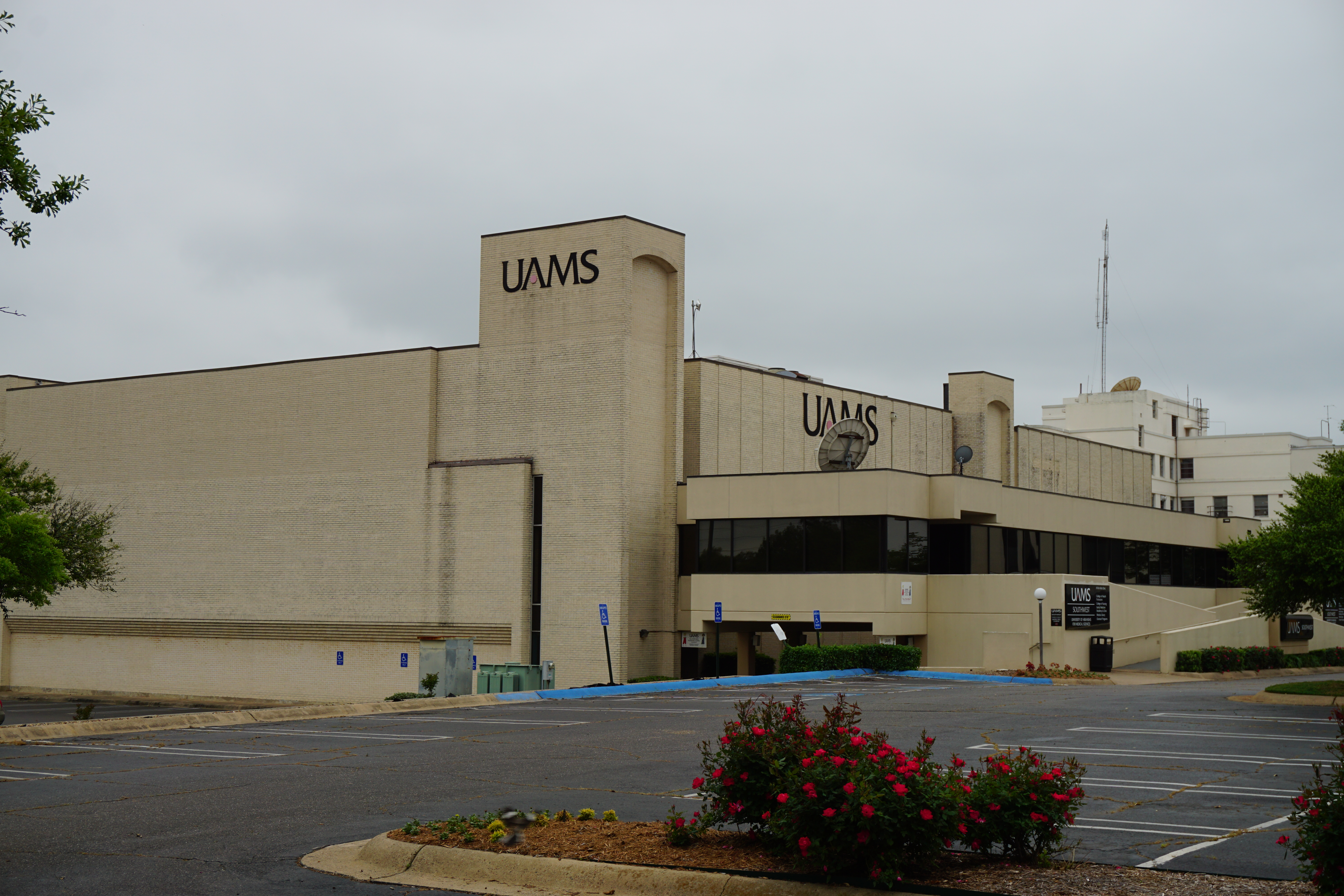
UAMS Southwest in Texarkana

Miller County's above-average poverty rate indicates a high Medicaid eligibility rate. As of 2012, 32.4% of Miller County was eligible for Medicaid, with 61.7% of children under 19 eligible for ARKids First, a program by the Arkansas Department of Human Services that combines children's Medicaid (ARKids A) and other programs for families with higher incomes (ARKids B). The county's population is significantly above healthy weight, with 54.0% of adults and 38.0% of children/adolescents ranking as overweight or obese, compared to the state averages of 67.1% and 39.3%, respectively. These rates are significantly above national averages of 62.9% and 30.3%, respectively.

The Christus St. Michael Health System and Christus Health Pine Street in Texarkana are community hospitals offering acute inpatient care, emergency care, surgery, rehabilitation, therapy, and senior care services. The facilities are both rated Level 3 Trauma Centers by the Arkansas Department of Health. The University of Arkansas for Medical Sciences (UAMS) offers a family medicine residency program at the UAMS Southwest Area Health Education Center in Texarkana. CHI St. Vincent Hot Springs in Hot Springs is a referral hospital in the region, focusing on neurosurgery, cancer treatment, cardiovascular care, and orthopaedics.

The nearest Level 1 Trauma Center is University Health in Shreveport.

=== Public safety ===
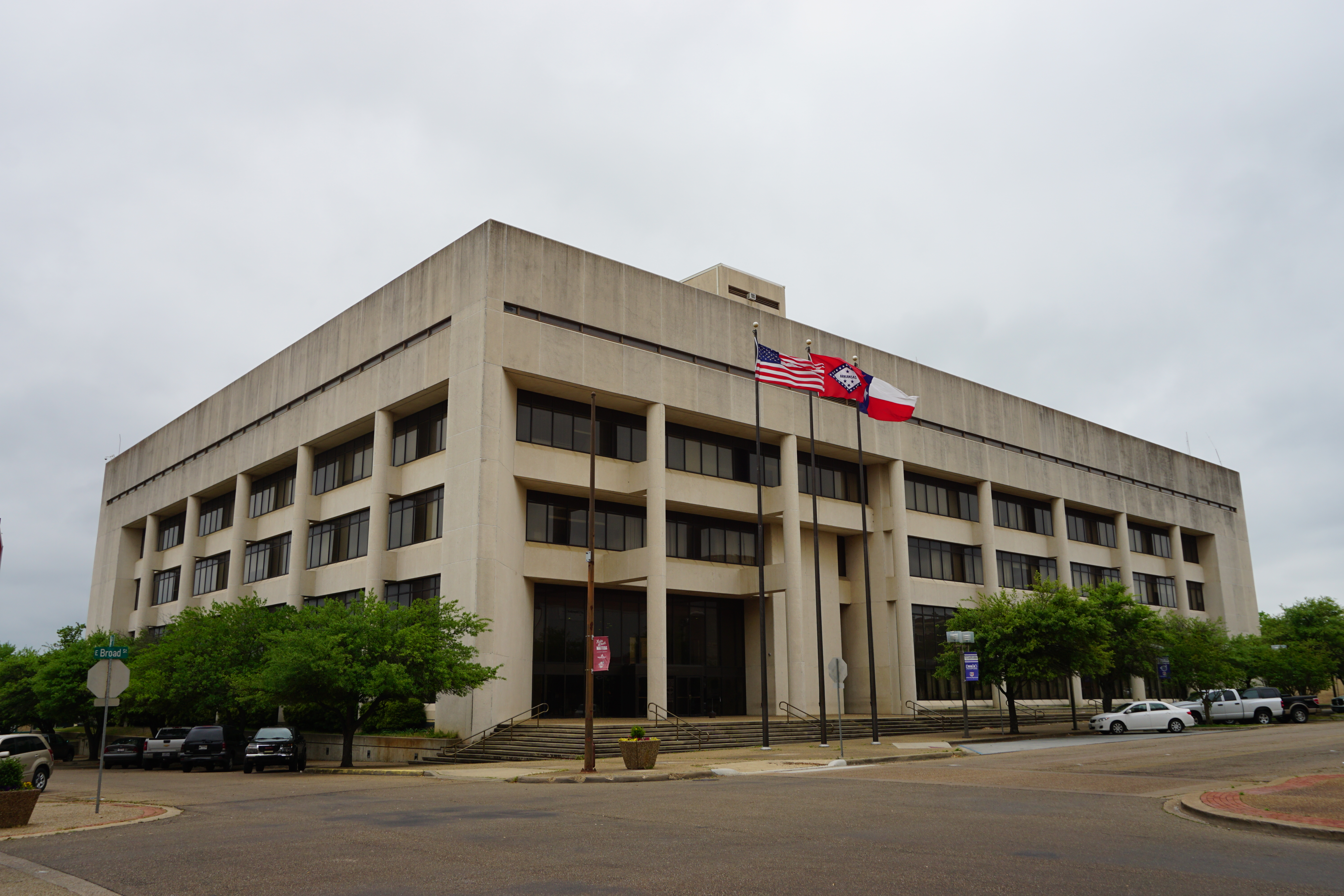
The Texarkana Department of district court is held at the Bi-State Justice Building at 100 State Line Avenue

The Miller County Sheriff's Office is the primary law enforcement agency in the county. The agency is led by the Miller County Sheriff, an official elected by countywide vote every four years.

The county is under the jurisdiction of the 37th District Court, a state district court. State district courts in Arkansas are courts of original jurisdiction for criminal, civil (up to $25,000), small claims, and traffic matters. State district courts are presided over by a full-time District Judge elected to a four-year term by a districtwide election. The judge presides over both the Texarkana Department at 100 North State Line Avenue in Texarkana and the Miller County Department at the Miller County Correctional Facility at 2300 East Street.

Superseding district court jurisdiction is the 8th Judicial Circuit Court South, which covers Miller and Lafayette counties. The 8th Circuit South contains three circuit judges, elected to six-year terms circuitwide. Circuit court is held at the Miller County Courthouse at 400 Laurel Street in Texarkana.

== Government ==
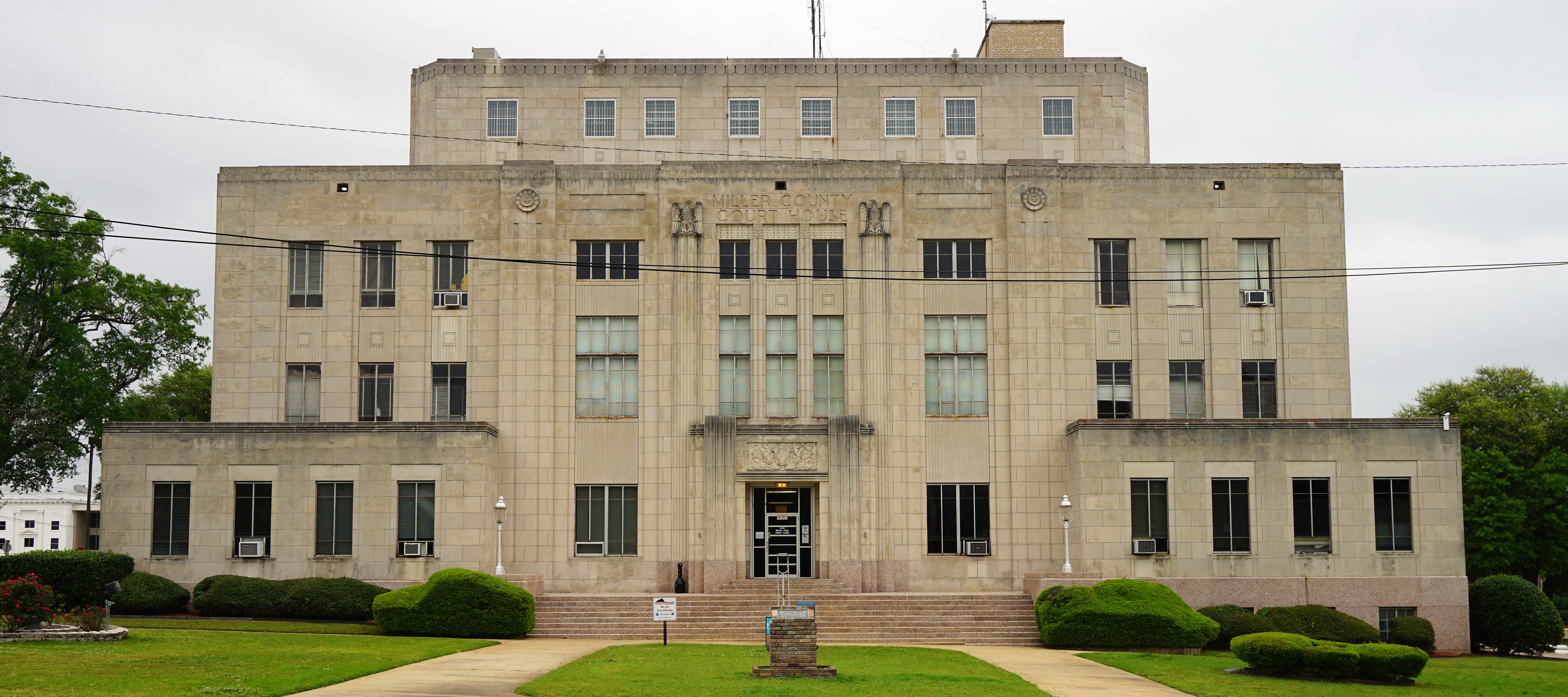
The Miller County Courthouse in Texarkana has been the seat of county government since 1939.

The county government is a constitutional body granted specific powers by the Constitution of Arkansas and the Arkansas Code. The quorum court is the legislative branch of the county government and controls all spending and revenue collection. Representatives are called justices of the peace and are elected from county districts every even-numbered year. The number of districts in a county vary from nine to fifteen, and district boundaries are drawn by the county election commission. The Miller County Quorum Court has eleven members. Presiding over quorum court meetings is the county judge, who serves as the chief operating officer of the county. The county judge is elected at-large and does not vote in quorum court business, although capable of vetoing quorum court decisions.

Miller County, Arkansas Elected countywide officials
Position	Officeholder	Party
County Judge	Cathy Hardin Harrison	Republican
County Clerk	Stephanie Harvin	Republican
Circuit Clerk	Penny Kilcrease	Republican
Sheriff	David Wayne Easley	Republican
Treasurer	Teresa Reed	Republican
Collector	Laura Bates	Republican
Assessor	Joyce Dennington	Republican
Coroner	Jan Gann	Republican

The composition of the Quorum Court following the 2024 elections is 11 Republicans.. Justices of the Peace (members) of the Quorum Court following the elections are:

- District 1: Judy Wilson (R) of Texarkana
- District 2: John Adger Smith (R) of Texarkana
- District 3: Ethan Eppinete (R) of Texarkana
- District 4: Carl Standridge (R) of Texarkana
- District 5: Ernest Keck (R) of Texarkana
- District 6: Ernest Pender (R) of Texarkana
- District 7: Larry East (R) of Texarkana
- District 8: Charles Robbie Hines (R) of Texarkana
- District 9: Howdy Smith (R) of Texarkana
- District 10: Jimmy Cowart (R) of Fouke
- District 11: Rodney Watkins (R) of Fouke

Additionally, the townships of Miller County are entitled to elect their own respective constables, as set forth by the Constitution of Arkansas. Constables are largely of historical significance as they were used to keep the peace in rural areas when travel was more difficult. The township constables as of the 2024 elections are:

- District 1: Jerry Shipp (R)
- District 2: Jamie Finley (R)
- District 3: Rebecca Potter (R)
- District 4: Art Parris (R)
- District 5: Jeff Prichett (R)
- District 6: Glen Gross (R)
- District 7: Tabitha Smith (R)
- District 8: Cliff Harvin (R)
- District 9: Leonard McDowell (R)
- District 10: William Cornett (R)
- District 11: Faron Gladden (R)

=== Politics ===
Since the mid-20th century, Miller County has transitioned from reliably Democratic to steady Republican in national, state and local elections. Miller County was part of the Solid South, a period of Democratic hegemony which began after Reconstruction following the Civil War. This resulted essentially in a one-party system, in which a candidate's victory in Democratic primary elections was tantamount to election to the office itself. The Solid South started to dissolve following the Civil Rights Act in 1964, which is when Miller County's streak of supporting Democratic candidates ended. The county would support every Republican presidential candidate after 1964, with exceptions for fellow Southerners: Alabama Governor George Wallace in 1968, Georgia Governor Jimmy Carter in 1976, and fellow Arkansan Bill Clinton in 1992 and 1996. Republican strength has been growing rapidly in Miller County, supporting George Bush with 53 and 58 percent of the vote, supporting Barack Obama’s opponents with 66 and 69 percent of the vote, and supporting Donald Trump with 70.2 and 72.1 percent of the vote.

United States presidential election results for Miller County, Arkansas
Year	Republican		Democratic		Third party(ies)	
Year	No.	%	No.	%	No.	%
1896	565	34.26%	1,073	65.07%	11	0.67%
1900	759	45.48%	855	51.23%	55	3.30%
1904	666	45.12%	763	51.69%	47	3.18%
1908	722	39.20%	1,035	56.19%	85	4.61%
1912	331	22.40%	846	57.24%	301	20.37%
1916	402	22.09%	1,418	77.91%	0	0.00%
1920	836	33.90%	1,545	62.65%	85	3.45%
1924	397	17.28%	1,460	63.56%	440	19.16%
1928	1,150	39.51%	1,752	60.19%	9	0.31%
1932	322	7.61%	3,876	91.57%	35	0.83%
1936	323	10.69%	2,689	89.01%	9	0.30%
1940	563	15.64%	3,019	83.88%	17	0.47%
1944	972	25.24%	2,873	74.60%	6	0.16%
1948	488	10.66%	2,850	62.24%	1,241	27.10%
1952	3,137	36.87%	5,337	62.72%	35	0.41%
1956	4,307	43.13%	5,402	54.09%	278	2.78%
1960	3,113	38.35%	4,550	56.06%	454	5.59%
1964	4,253	44.81%	5,190	54.68%	49	0.52%
1968	2,662	24.99%	2,929	27.49%	5,062	47.52%
1972	8,355	74.53%	2,855	25.47%	0	0.00%
1976	4,679	41.23%	6,648	58.58%	22	0.19%
1980	6,770	52.40%	5,996	46.41%	155	1.20%
1984	8,302	63.43%	4,686	35.80%	100	0.76%
1988	7,110	56.30%	5,437	43.05%	82	0.65%
1992	5,273	36.06%	7,050	48.21%	2,300	15.73%
1996	4,874	38.97%	6,469	51.73%	1,163	9.30%
2000	7,276	52.94%	6,278	45.67%	191	1.39%
2004	8,448	57.56%	6,139	41.82%	91	0.62%
2008	9,913	65.81%	4,869	32.32%	281	1.87%
2012	10,622	69.29%	4,518	29.47%	189	1.23%
2016	11,294	70.19%	4,273	26.56%	524	3.26%
2020	11,920	72.12%	4,245	25.68%	364	2.20%
2024	11,842	74.94%	3,769	23.85%	192	1.21%

In Congress, Arkansas has been represented by two Republican senators (John Boozman and Tom Cotton) since January 3, 2015, ending a long history of Democratic hegemony. In the House of Representatives, Miller County is within Arkansas's 4th congressional district, which contains Southwest Arkansas, the Arkansas River Valley, and a few Ozark counties. Arkansas's 4th district has been represented by Bruce Westerman since 2014.

In the Arkansas Senate, Miller County is within the 11th District. The district also contains Little River and Lafayette counties, and parts of Hempstead and Sevier counties. The 11th has been represented by Jimmy Hickey Jr. (R-Texarkana) since 2013. In the Arkansas House of Representatives, Miller County contains two Districts. The 1st District is almost coterminal with Texarkana, with the rest of the county within the 2nd District. The 2nd District also covers most of Lafayette County and parts of Columbia County, including Magnolia. The Texarkana district has been represented by Carol Dalby (R) since 2016, with the 2nd District represented by Lane Jean (R) since 2012.

Miller County has produced some successful politicians, including three longtime members of the U.S. House of Representatives: Mike Ross represented the Arkansas 4th from 2001 to 2013, Walter E. Rogers represented the Texas's 18th from 1951 to 1967, and Max Sandlin represented the Texas 1st from 1997 to 2005. William F. Kirby served as Arkansas Attorney General from 1907 to 1909, Arkansas Supreme Court Associate Justice from 1910 to 1916 and 1926 to 1934, and represented Arkansas in the U.S. Senate from 1916 to 1921.

=== Taxation ===
Property tax is assessed by the Miller County Assessor annually based upon the fair market value of the property and determining which tax rate, commonly called a millage in Arkansas, will apply. The rate depends upon the property's location with respect to city limits, school district, and special tax increment financing (TIF) districts. This tax is collected by the Miller County Collector between the first business day of March of each year through October 15 without penalty. The Miller County Treasurer disburses tax revenues to various government agencies, such as cities, county road departments, fire departments, libraries, and police departments in accordance with the budget set by the quorum court.

Due to Miller County's proximity to Texas, which has no state personal income tax, special taxation exemptions apply to residents with permanent addresses within the city limits of Texarkana. The Arkansas Department of Finance and Administration (DFA) requires taxpayers to submit the Texarkana Employee's Withholding Exemption Certificate with their Arkansas tax return. Taxpayers are exempt from Arkansas income tax, and residents of Texarkana, Texas are exempt from Arkansas income tax from any income earned within the city limits of Texarkana, Arkansas.

Sales and use taxes in Arkansas are voter approved and collected by the DFA. Arkansas's statewide sales and use tax has been 6.5% since July 1, 2013. Miller County has an additional sales and use tax of 1.25%, which has been in effect since October 1, 2012. Within Miller County, the City of Texarkana has an additional 2.5% sales and use tax since January 1, 2008, and the towns of Fouke and Garland having an additional 1.0% sales and use tax, each since the early 1980s The Arkansas State Treasurer disburses tax revenue to counties/cities in accordance with tax rules.

== Communities ==
=== City ===
- Texarkana (county seat)

=== Towns ===
- Fouke
- Garland

=== Census-designated place ===
- Genoa

=== Unincorporated communities ===
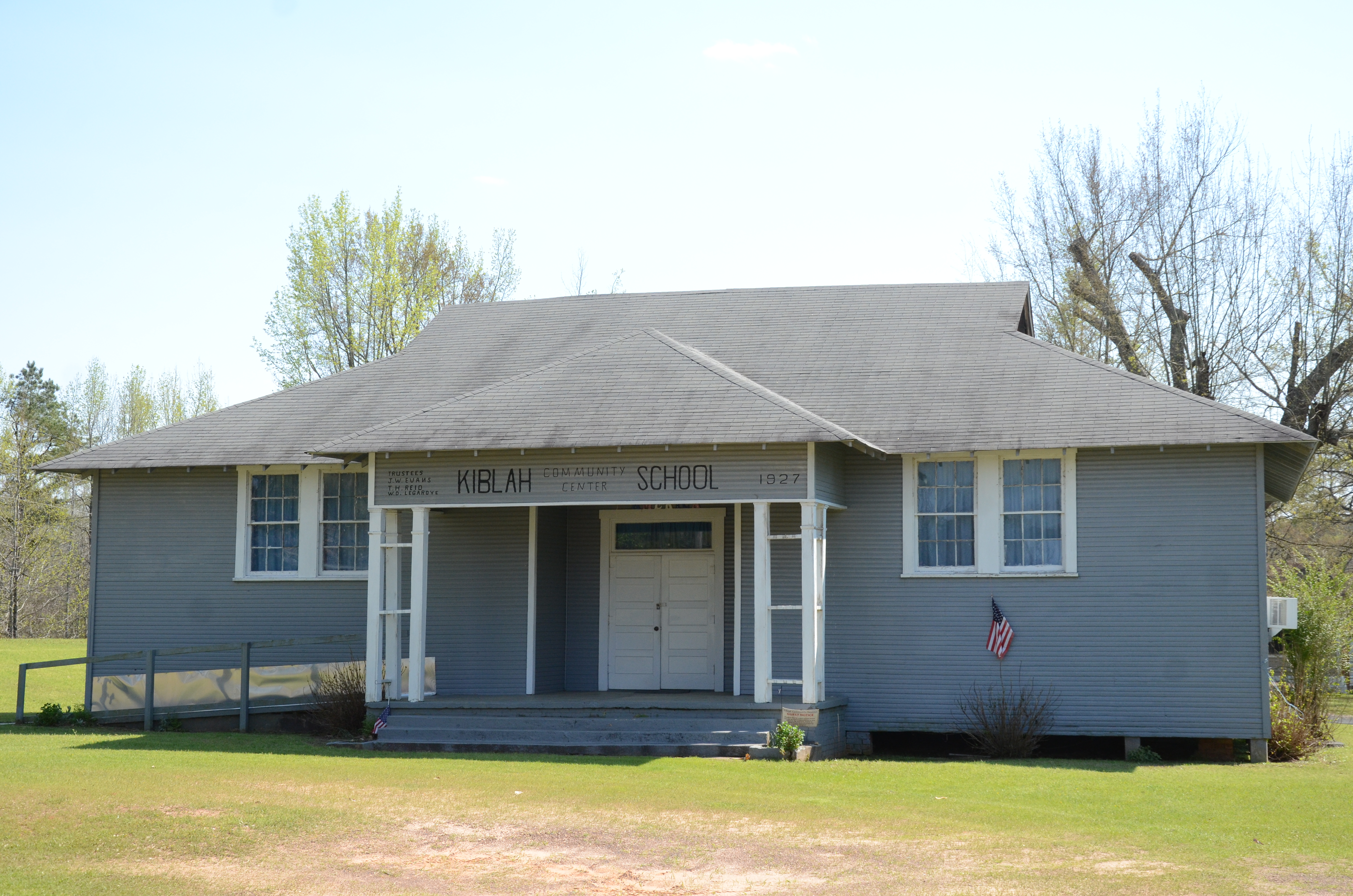
The Kiblah School served the Kiblah area from 1927 until 1949

- Artex
- Beck
- Black Diamond
- Boggy
- Boyd
- Brightstar
- Capps City
- Clear Lake Junction
- Clipper
- Doddridge
- Dooley
- Fairland
- Ferguson Crossroads
- Fort Lynn
- Gertrude
- Hammons
- Hervey
- Homan
- Index
- Jonesville
- Kiblah
- Lakewood Estates
- Mandeville
- Mayton
- McKinney
- Mount Pleasant
- Paup
- Pleasant Hill
- Ravanna
- Rocky Mound
- Rondo
- Smithville
- Sylverino

=== Historical communities ===
- Boggy
- Era
- Roverts
- Spring Bank
- Wona

=== Townships ===
Townships in Arkansas are the divisions of a county. Each township includes unincorporated areas; some may have incorporated cities or towns within part of their boundaries. Arkansas townships have limited purposes in modern times. However, the United States census does list Arkansas population based on townships (sometimes referred to as "county subdivisions" or "minor civil divisions"). Townships are also of value for historical purposes in terms of genealogical research. Each town or city is within one or more townships in an Arkansas county based on census maps and publications. The townships of Miller County are listed below; listed in parentheses are the cities, towns, and/or census-designated places that are fully or partially inside the township.

- Beech (Fouke)
- Cleveland
- Cut Off
- Days Creek
- Garland (Texarkana)
- Homan
- Red River (Garland)
- Sulphur

== Infrastructure ==
=== Major highways ===
- Interstate 30
- Interstate 49
- U.S. Highway 59
- U.S. Highway 67
- U.S. Highway 71
- U.S. Highway 82
- Highway 108
- Highway 134
- Highway 151
- Highway 160
- Highway 196
- Highway 237
- Highway 245
- Highway 296
- Highway 549
- Highway 946

=== Utilities ===
The Arkansas Department of Health (ADH) is responsible for the regulation and oversight of public water systems throughout the state. Miller County contains six community water systems: Texarkana Water Utilities (TWU), Fouke Waterworks, Miller County Public Water Authority (PWA), Garland Waterworks, Eastern Cass Water Supply Corporation, and Shady Acres Mobile Home Park. TWU, a joint department between the two Texarkana municipalities, provides drinking water and fire flows on both sides of the state line, including several partner cities in Texas. Its source waters are Lake Millwood in Arkansas and Lake Wright Patman in Texas. Miller County PWA purchases water from TWU, and has the same executive director as of February 2018. The remaining systems have retail populations served under 1,000, and are groundwater systems.

== See also ==
- List of lakes in Miller County, Arkansas
- National Register of Historic Places listings in Miller County, Arkansas
