= 1978 Bossier City tornado outbreak =

Weather event in the United States

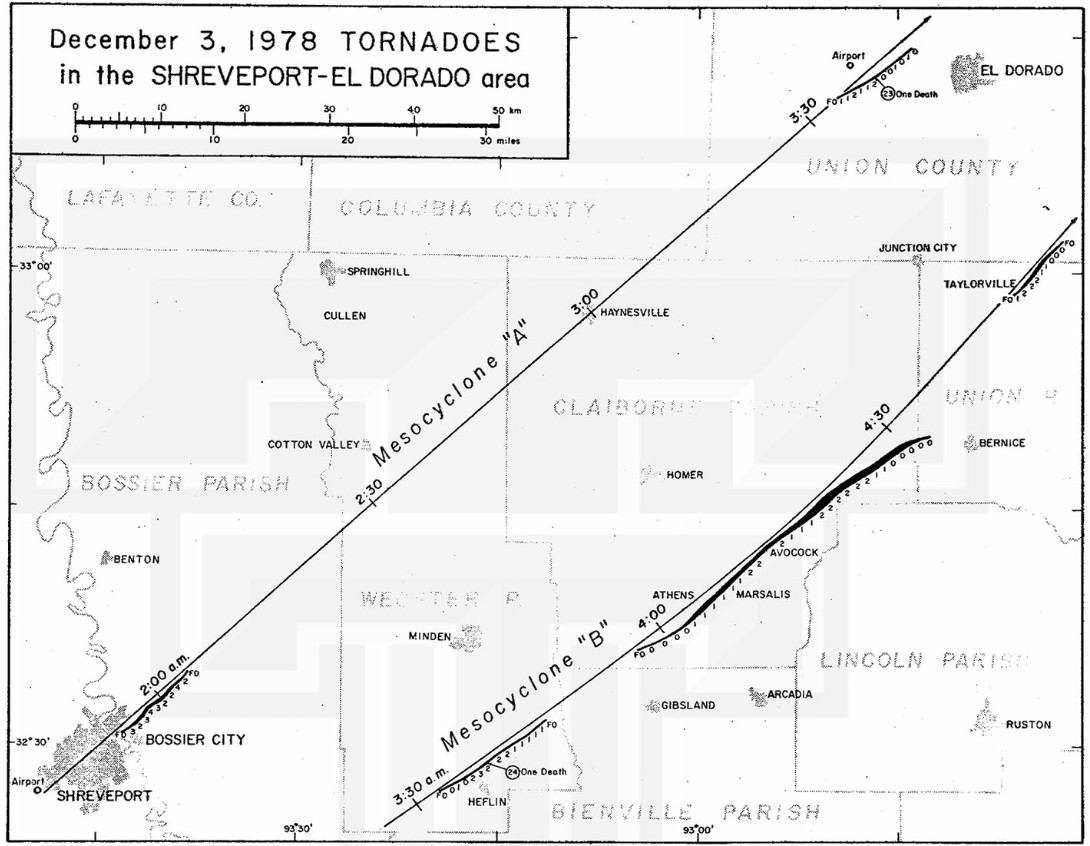
- Ted Fujita's map of the northwest Louisiana tornadoes from the outbreak

Meteorological history
- Duration: December 3, 1978

Tornado outbreak
- Tornadoes: 11
- Max. rating: F4 tornado

Overall effects
- Casualties: 5 fatalities, 277 injuries
- Areas affected: Southeastern United States
- Part of the tornado outbreaks of 1978

The 1978 Bossier City tornado outbreak was an outbreak of 11 tornadoes that occurred during the early morning hours of December 3, 1978, in Louisiana and Arkansas. The outbreak produced several significant (F2–F5) tornadoes, several of which were long tracked. The first and most destructive of the tornadoes was a violent F4 tornado touched down on the eastern bank of the Red River in Bossier City, Louisiana, at approximately 1:50 a.m. CST. The tornado produced a path up to .5 miles (0.8 km) wide and nearly 4 miles (6.4 km) long through the heart of Bossier City. The only two deaths to occur in Bossier City were two young girls who were killed when a car was thrown through their bedroom wall. The Bossier City tornado became the fifth tornado in American history to produce at least $100 million (non-adjusted) in damage.

== Meteorological synopsis ==
On Monday, November 27, 1978, a cold front moved through Northwest Louisiana. By Friday, December 1, a positively tilted trough was present in the upper atmosphere from the High Plains to the Desert Southwest. This allowed Gulf moisture to return to the lower part of the atmosphere Friday night. The placement of the upper atmospheric trough allowed very little movement of the associated front from Thursday to Saturday. At this time, the front stretched over north Texas, Southern Missouri, Southwestern Arkansas, and Southeast Oklahoma. This front was unusually strong for the month of December, and placed the Shreveport area under the right exit region of a strong jet stream. The strong synoptic-scale lifting was favorable to thunderstorm formation. Also at this time, a low pressure system had developed over Northeast Texas. This caused increased low-level wind shear that enabled the development of thunderstorms. Meanwhile, a warm temperature plume, or inversion, at the 850-millibar geopotential height allowed low-level instability to increase. CAPE thus soared to 2,179 j/kg on December 2, the evening before the outbreak began.

== Confirmed tornadoes ==
Confirmed tornadoes by Fujita rating
FU	F0	F1	F2	F3	F4	F5	Total
0	2	3	5	2	1	0	11

=== December 3 event ===
List of confirmed tornadoes – Sunday, December 3, 1978
F#	Location	County/Parish	Time (UTC)	Path length	Damage
Louisiana
F4	S of Shreveport to Bossier City	Bossier	0750	6.2 miles (10.0 km)	2 deaths – See section on this tornado – Devastated a large part of Bossier City but caused very few deaths, considering the nighttime occurrence. 266 people were injured.
F3	SW of Cotton Valley to NE of Spearsville	Bossier, Webster, Claiborne, Union	0830	61.1 miles (98.3 km)	Only minor damage occurred as this tornado passed through rural areas, though the tornado may have not been continuously in contact with the ground. The tornado snapped or blew down hundreds of trees as it crossed the Kisatchie National Forest. The path ended near Lockhart in Union Parish.
F3	NW of Heflin to E of Junction City, Arkansas	Webster, Claiborne, Union, Union (AR)	0938	60 miles (97 km)	2 deaths – The tornado skipped through the Tillman community, killing two men in trailer homes. One house sustained F3 damage north of Marsalis. Other houses sustained near-F3 damage east of Athens. In all, the tornado damaged or destroyed about 25 houses. Only minor damage occurred in Arkansas. Four people were injured.
Arkansas
F2	SW of Amy to S of Ivan	Ouachita, Dallas	0800	25.2 miles (40.6 km)	One unoccupied house was destroyed and another was moved 8 feet (2.4 m) off its foundation. The tornado also destroyed 3,000 acres (1,200 ha) of forestland.
F2	SW of El Dorado	Union	0925	6.4 miles (10.3 km)	1 death – Reportedly formed from the same storm that produced the Bossier City tornado. A tornado destroyed four trailers, six houses, and numerous outbuildings. A woman was fatally crushed in her trailer by falling trees. Seven people were injured nearby.
F1	SE of Pine Bluff	Jefferson	0930	3.8 miles (6.1 km)	A tornado damaged houses and outbuildings in Ladd.
F1	NE of Calion to SE of Harrell	Calhoun	1000	8.4 miles (13.5 km)	A tornado damaged several buildings.
F1	SE of Humphrey to N of Crocketts Bluff	Arkansas	1030	25.3 miles (40.7 km)	Damages reached $25 million.
F1	S of Holly Grove	Monroe	1055	0.5 miles (0.80 km)	Only one house was damaged.
F2	Marianna	Lee	1112	1 mile (1.6 km)	A short-lived tornado destroyed five airport buildings and two trailers. Five aircraft were damaged or destroyed, and 30 houses were damaged.
F2	SE of Star City to E of Gould	Lincoln, Desha	1115	18.6 miles (29.9 km)	Many buildings and houses were "torn apart." Estimated total damages came to $500,000.
Source: National Climatic Database Center

=== Shreveport/Bossier City, Louisiana ===
Shreveport/Bossier City, Louisiana
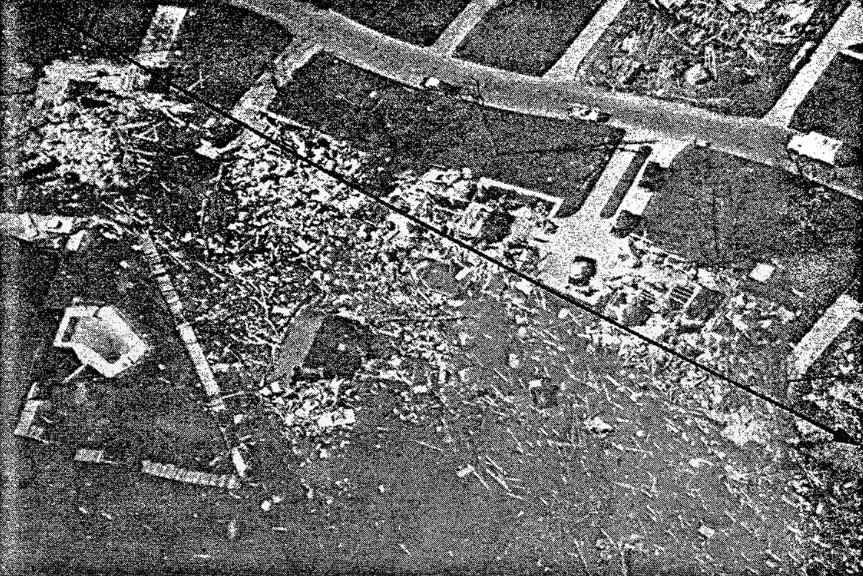
- F4 damage in Bossier City

Meteorological history
- Formed: December 3, 1978, 1:50 a.m. CDT (UTC−05:00)
- Dissipated: December 3, 1978, 1:58 a.m. CDT (UTC−05:00)
- Duration: 8 minutes

F4 tornado
- on the Fujita scale
- Highest winds: 260 mph (420 km/h)

Overall effects
- Casualties: 2 fatalities, 266 injuries
- Damage: $100 million

In Deep East Texas, a series of supercell thunderstorms developed ahead of a squall line. As thunderstorms approached the area, a Severe thunderstorm warning was issued at 1:27 a.m. CST for northern Caddo and Bossier Parishes. The supercell which spawned the tornado tracked over the town of Deadwood, Texas, before moving over Southwood High School, Pierremont Mall, and the VA Hospital in Shreveport with no reports of tornadic activity. The National Weather Service office in Shreveport clocked the supercell's winds at 52 miles per hour (84 km/h). Due to radar indication of possible rotation, the NWS issued a tornado warning at 1:33 a.m. CST. At 1:50 a.m. the tornado may have touched down just south of downtown Shreveport, causing damage, though post-storm analysis suggested that this was likely related to downburst activity. The circulation then crossed into the Central Park subdivision in western central Bossier City and made full contact with the ground. The tornado caused minor damage in the Central Park neighborhood which amounted to some roof damage and fallen trees. The tornado's track across Old Minden Road brought it through the SWEPCO power substation, creating a tangle of power lines and connectors.

The tornado then crossed Interstate 20 and then Barksdale Boulevard, making its way into the Heart of Bossier Shopping Center and causing extensive damage. As it touched down near the Heart of Bossier Shopping Center, it destroyed Christmas decorations, street lights, and sign posts. Baskin-Robbins and Pancho's were among the businesses in the Heart of Bossier Shopping Center which sustained major damage. It continued northeast across Old Minden Road striking a power substation, the Port-au-Prince apartments, the Sheraton Hotel, several houses in the adjacent Central Plaza subdivision and Rusheon Junior High School. Two buildings at the Port-au-Prince Apartments lost their roofs and cars throughout the parking lot were piled on top of each other. The Sheraton hotel and Rusheon Junior High School also sustained roof damage and broken windows. As the tornado traveled along Interstate 20, several 18-wheelers were toppled by the winds. It continued parallel to Interstate 20 into the Airline Drive Business District, where it produced widespread F3 damage. In this area, numerous businesses were damaged or completely leveled, including Pizza Hut, the Best Western, the Master Hosts Inn, Whataburger, Thrifty Liquor and K-Mart. A small area surrounding the Whataburger received high-end F3 to marginal F4 winds. One noted anomaly was the minor damage caused to the Whataburger. It was later speculated that the position of the Whataburger situated between two suction vortices.

The tornado made its way through K-Mart and the intersection of Airline Drive and U.S. Route 80 throwing several mobile homes out into the middle of U.S. Route 80. After crossing U.S. Route 80, the tornado moved through a sparsely populated area and then into the Meadowview and Swan Lake submissions, destroying substantial parts of the neighborhood. Traveling into the Meadowview neighborhood, the tornado tore through several streets of housing. It was in this neighborhood that the only two deaths occurred from this tornado. In this area the tornado was at F4 intensity, with winds estimated at 260 miles per hour (420 km/h); several I-beams weighing 700 pounds (318 kg) were thrown hundreds of feet and speared into the ground. On La Don Drive, Lisa and Jana Currington, ages 13 and 8, were killed when a car was thrown through the wall of the bedroom they were sleeping in. Aerial photography revealed a distinct swath of ground scouring in the Meadowview area. Meadowview Elementary School suffered extensive damage with one wing of the school being completely destroyed. Nearby, a National Guard armory was completely destroyed. As it crossed Interstate 220, the tornado leveled the Northwest Louisiana State School. As it passed through the Stockwell Place subdivision, the tornado again produced F4 damage to several homes. The storm continued to track northeastward until it dissipated over the Red Chute area.

Total damage from the tornado reached $100 million (1978 USD), making the tornado one of the top 30 costliest on record in the United States. Dr. Tetsuya T. Fujita surveyed the tornado damage and completed extensive surveys on the ground and from the air. He assigned the F4 rating after extensive investigation, though the F4 damage only occurred in small sections of the Meadowview, Swan Lake, and Stockwell Place subdivisions. In all, the tornado destroyed 75 homes and 51 businesses throughout a large part of Bossier City, and damaged hundreds of other buildings.
