= Arkansas Highway 335 =

Highway in Arkansas

Highway 335

Route information
- Maintained by ArDOT
- Length: 17.67 mi (28.44 km)
- Existed: June 23, 1965–present

Major junctions
- South end: AR 15 at Newell
- US 82 near El Dorado
- North end: US 167 near Norphlet

Location
- Country: United States
- State: Arkansas
- Counties: Union

Highway system
- Arkansas Highway System; Interstate; US; State; Business; Spurs; Suffixed; Scenic; Heritage
← AR 334	→ AR 336

Highway 335 (AR 335, Ark. 335, and Hwy. 335) is a north–south state highway in Union County, Arkansas. The highway begins at Highway 15 and runs northeast to U.S. Highway 167 (US 167). It is maintained by the Arkansas Department of Transportation (ArDOT).

== Route description ==
Highway 335 partially circles El Dorado within the South Arkansas region. It begins at an intersection with Highway 15 at Newell near Little Cornie Bayou. The highway runs north to a junction with US 82. The two routes form a brief concurrency eastward, before Highway 335 turns north on Wyatt Drive. The highway passes through a flat, forested area typical of the Gulf Coastal Plain, sparsely populated with residences, churches, and three cemeteries. Highway 335 intersects the four-lane divided Highway 7 (Smackover Highway / Scenic 7 Byway) north of El Dorado.

After the intersection, Highway 335 turns north toward Norphlet, where it turns east onto Tate Street and passes south of downtown and crossing the Union Pacific Railway line. East of the town, Highway 335 winds through a sparsely populated rural area, crossing Haynes Creek before terminating at US 167.

The ArDOT maintains Highway 355 like all other parts of the state highway system. As a part of these responsibilities, the department tracks the volume of traffic using its roads in surveys using a metric called average annual daily traffic (AADT). ArDOT estimates the traffic level for a segment of roadway for any average day of the year in these surveys. As of 2016, the highest estimated count was between Highway 7 and Norphlet, with 2,000 vehicles per day (VPD). It drops between 1,000 and 2,000 west of the Highway 7 intersection. East of Norphlet, Highway 335 saw 480 VPD.

No segment of Highway 335 has been listed as part of the National Highway System, a network of roads important to the nation's economy, defense, and mobility.

== Major intersections ==
Mile markers reset at concurrencies. The entire route is in Union County.

Location	mi	km	Destinations	Notes
Newell	0.00	0.00	AR 15 (Haynesville Highway) – El Dorado	Southern terminus
	2.86– 0.00	4.60– 0.00	US 82 – Magnolia, El Dorado	
	7.58	12.20	AR 7 (Smackover Highway / Scenic 7 Byway) – Camden, El Dorado	
	14.81	23.83	US 167 – Fordyce, El Dorado	Northern terminus
1.000 mi = 1.609 km; 1.000 km = 0.621 mi: Concurrency terminus

== History ==
Highway 335 was created between US 82 and Highway 7 by the Arkansas State Highway Commission on June 23, 1965. It was extended east to US 167 the following year. A second segment of Highway 335 was created in the El Dorado city limits on November 2, 1994. It was swapped in exchange for extending Highway 335 south to Highway 15.

=== Former route ===
Highway 335
- Location: El Dorado
- Length: 2 mi (3.2 km)
- Existed: November 2, 1994–April 26, 1995

Highway 335 (AR 335, Ark. 335, and Hwy. 335) is a former state highway of 2 miles (3.2 km) in El Dorado.

Route description

The route started at a diamond interchange with US 82 and Highway 15 in southwestern El Dorado.

Major intersections

The entire route was in El Dorado, Union County.

mi	km	Destinations	Notes
0	0.0	US 82 / AR 15 (Haynesville Highway) – Magnolia, Crossett, Parker's Chapel	Southern terminus
2	3.2	US 82B (Hillsboro Street) / US 167B (West Avenue)	Northern terminus
1.000 mi = 1.609 km; 1.000 km = 0.621 mi
