= Smackover High School =

Location
- 1 Buckaroo Lane; Smackover, Arkansas 71762; United States; 33°21′58″N 92°43′50″W

Information
- School type: Public comprehensive
- Status: Open
- School district: Smackover-Norphlet School District (formerly the Smackover School District)
- CEEB code: 042285
- NCES School ID: 051251001009
- Teaching staff: 35.76 (on FTE basis)
- Grades: 9-12
- Enrollment: 368 (2016-17)
- Student to teacher ratio: 10.34
- Education system: ADE Smart Core
- Classes offered: Regular, Advanced Placement (AP)
- Colors: Black and white
- Slogan: Building; Upon; Caring, Knowledge, and Spirit!
- Athletics conference: 3A 6 (football); 3A 8 (basketball)
- Mascot: Buckaroo
- Nickname: Battlin' Buckaroos
- Team name: Smackover Buckaroos
- Accreditation: ADE
- Communities served: Smackover, Norphlet, Calion, Louann, and Mount Holly.
- Website: www.smackover.net/smackover-high-school-2

Smackover High School (SHS) is a comprehensive public high school located in Smackover, Arkansas, United States. The school provides secondary education for more than 280 students in grades 9 through 12. It is one of five public high schools in Union County. It is the sole high school administered by the Smackover-Norphlet School District (formerly the Smackover School District).

Its district has territory in Union County, Ouachita County, and Columbia County. The district, and therefore the high school, serves Smackover, Norphlet, Calion, Louann, and Mount Holly.

== History ==
It was previously a grade 7-12 institution. In the 2015-2016 school year the former Norphlet High School became a middle school for the entire school district while Smackover High became the senior high school for the entire district; the Smackover district and the Norphlet School District had merged the previous year.

== Academics ==
Smackover High School is accredited by the Arkansas Department of Education (ADE). The assumed course of study follows the ADE Smart Core curriculum, which requires students complete at least 22 units prior to graduation. Students complete regular coursework and exams and may take Advanced Placement (AP) courses and exam with the opportunity to receive college credit.

== Extracurricular activities ==
The Smackover High School mascot and athletic emblem is the Buckaroo with black and white serving as the school colors.

=== Athletics ===
For 2015-2017, the Smackover Battlin' Buckaroos participate in interscholastic activities within the 3A Classification via the 3A Region 6 (football) and 3A Region 8 (basketball) conferences, as administered by the Arkansas Activities Association. The Buckaroos compete in football, cross country (boys/girls), golf (boys/girls), bowling (boys/girls), basketball (boys/girls), baseball, softball, track and field (boys/girls), and cheer.

- Football:
  - 5 State Championships(1940, 41, 43, 44, 49)
  - 19 Conference Championships(1940, 41, 48, 49, 55, 72, 73, 81, 82, 84, 85, 86, 87, 90, 97, 2005, 13, 14, 15)
  - 25 Playoff Appearances
  - 26-25 Playoff Record
  - 8 High School All American Selections
- Baseball:
  - 2 State Championships(1991 & 1998)
- Golf:
  - 3 State Championships(1977, 2003, 2012)
- Track and field:
  - 4 State Championships(1955, 1956, 1976 and 1991)

== Notable alumni ==
- Clyde Scott, American football player (Philadelphia Eagles, Detroit Lions) and hurdler, Olympic silver medalist (1948).
