= Arkansas Highway 15 =

Designation for two state highways in Arkansas

Highway 15

Route information
- Maintained by ArDOT
- Existed: 1926–present

Section 1
- Length: 21.2 mi (34.1 km)
- South end: LA 161 at the Louisiana state line in Dodge City
- North end: US 82 in El Dorado

Section 2
- Length: 18.12 mi (29.16 km)
- South end: US 79B near Altheimer
- North end: US 165 in England

Section 3
- Length: 16.33 mi (26.28 km)
- South end: US 165 in Keo
- Major intersections: US 70; I-40 near Furlow
- North end: AR 89 / AR 294 in Furlow

Location
- Country: United States
- State: Arkansas
- Counties: Union, Jefferson, Lonoke

Highway system
- Arkansas Highway System; Interstate; US; State; Business; Spurs; Suffixed; Scenic; Heritage
← AR 14	→ AR 16

Arkansas Highway 15 (AR 15) is a designation for three state highways in Arkansas. One segment of 21.2 miles (34.1 km) runs from the Louisiana state line north to U.S. Route 82 (US 82) in El Dorado. A second segment of 18.12 miles (29.16 km) runs from US 79B west of Altheimer north to US 165 in England. A third segment of 16.33 miles (26.28 km) runs from US 165 in Keo north to Highway 89 in Furlow.

== Route description ==
=== Louisiana to El Dorado ===
Highway 15 begins at the Louisiana state line as a continuation of Louisiana Highway 161 and runs northeast, cutting through South Arkansas country. The highway serves as a southern terminus for Highway 335 outside El Dorado, Highway 15's lone junction with another state road. Highway 15 next meets the four-lane U.S. Route 82 outside El Dorado, where it terminates.

=== Altheimer to England ===
The route begins at US 79B west of Altheimer and runs north, intersecting Highway 31 in Sherrill near the Sherrill Methodist Episcopal Church and the Tucker School in Tucker before entering Lonoke County, where it terminates at US 165 in England.

=== Keo to Furlow ===
The route begins at US 165 in Keo and runs due north across US 70 and I-40 before ending at Highway 89 and Highway 294 in Furlow.

== Major intersections ==
County	Location	mi	km	Destinations	Notes
Union		0.00	0.00	LA 161 south	Continuation into Louisiana
Union	Newell	16.79	27.02	AR 335 north (Del Tin Highway) to US 82	Southern terminus of AR 335
Union		21.20	34.12	US 82 – El Dorado, Magnolia, Crossett, Airport	Northern terminus; exit 18 on US 82
Gap in route
Jefferson		0.00	0.00	US 79B – Altheimer, Pine Bluff	Southern terminus
Jefferson		5.70	9.17	AR 31 to US 79B – Pine Bluff, Gethsemane	
Lonoke	England	18.12	29.16	US 165 – North Little Rock, Humnoke	Northern terminus
Lonoke	Gap in route				
Lonoke	Keo	0.00	0.00	US 165 – England, Scott	Southern terminus
Lonoke		10.93	17.59	US 70	
Lonoke		13.69	22.03	I-40 – Little Rock, Memphis	Exit 169 on I-40
Lonoke	Furlow	16.33	26.28	AR 89 / AR 294 west – Cabot, Jacksonville, Lonoke	Northern terminus; eastern terminus of AR 294
1.000 mi = 1.609 km; 1.000 km = 0.621 mi

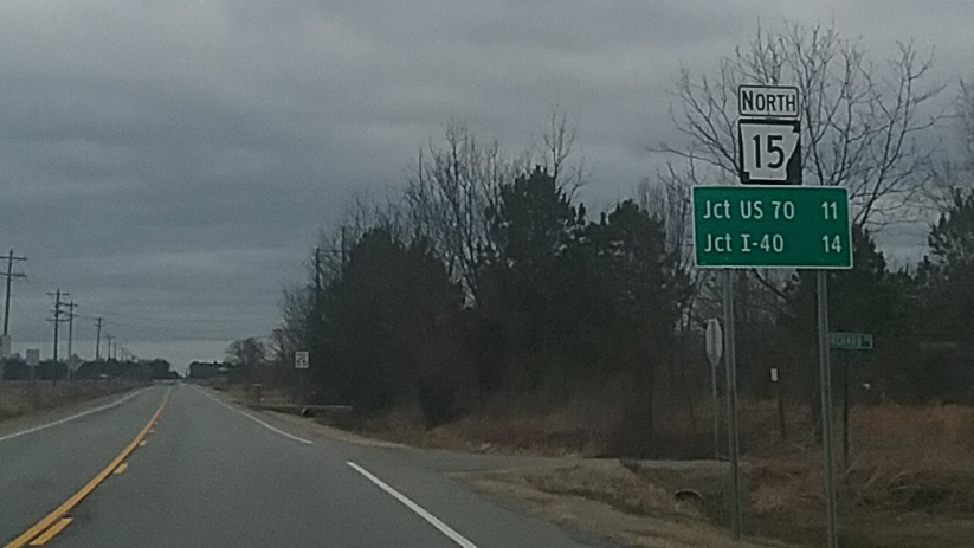
Highway 15 runs through Keo.

== History ==

Highway 15 was one of the original 1926 routes designated by the Arkansas Highway Commission. The modern day routes were connected. Highway 15 continued east from El Dorado into Bradley County through Hermitage and Warren. The route continued north into Cleveland County through Pansy and into Jefferson County, where it ran through Pine Bluff and along present-day Highway 31 north to Sherrill, where it meets with today's routing.

The original 1926 routing ended at Highway 36 in England, and no state highway ran to Furlow.

== See also ==
- List of state highways in Arkansas
