= Calion, Arkansas =

- City
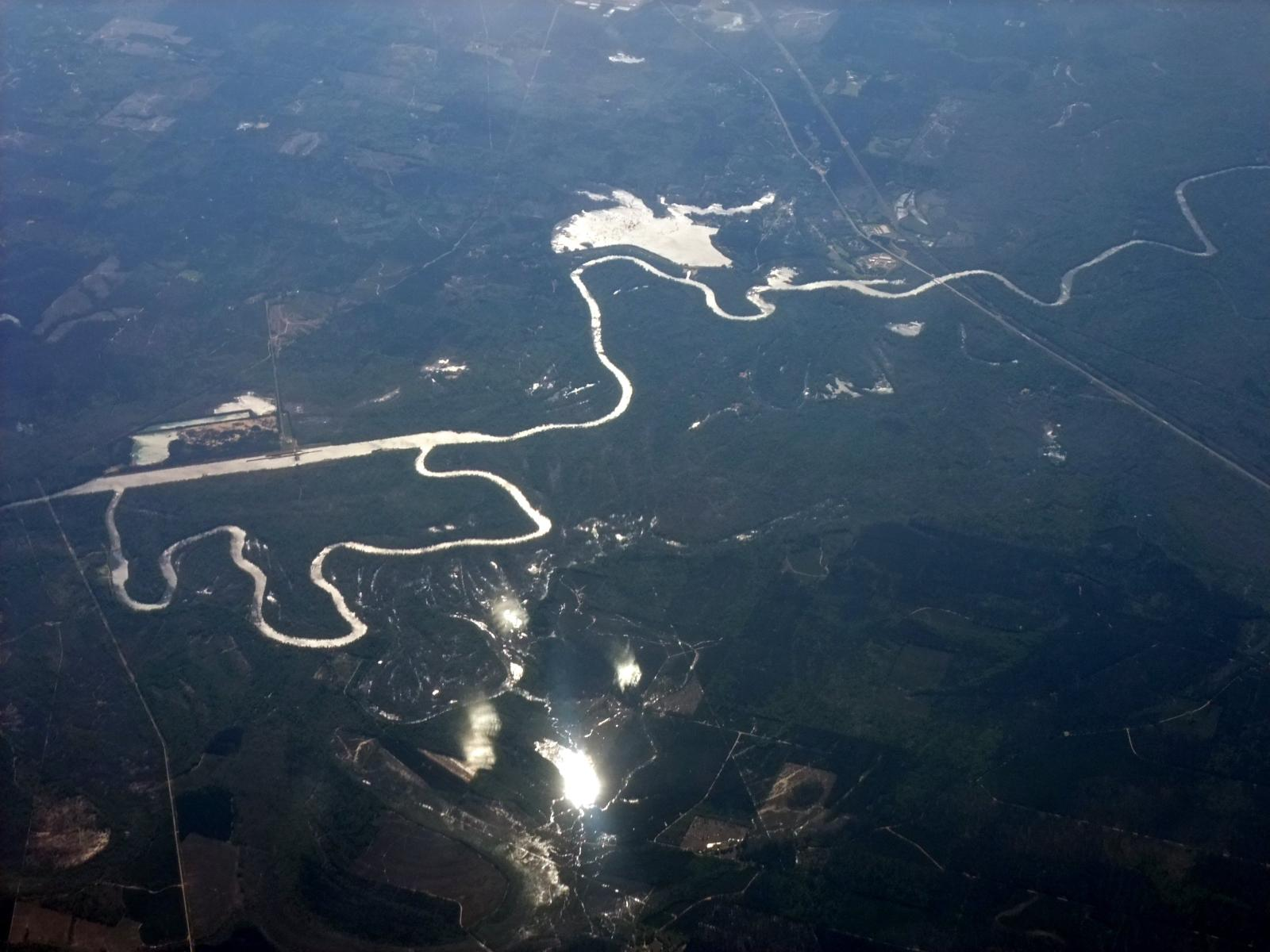
- Aerial view of Calion

- Location of Calion in Union County, Arkansas.
- Coordinates: 33°19′43″N 92°32′24″W
- Country: United States
- State: Arkansas
- County: Union

Area
  - Total: 1.31 sq mi (3.38 km^{2})
  - Land: 1.07 sq mi (2.78 km^{2})
  - Water: 0.23 sq mi (0.60 km^{2})
- Elevation: 95 ft (29 m)

Population (2020)
  - Total: 429
  - Estimate (2025): 409 ▼
  - Density: 400.1/sq mi (154.49/km^{2})
- Time zone: UTC-6 (Central (CST))
  - Summer (DST): UTC-5 (CDT)
- ZIP code: 71724
- Area code: 870
- FIPS code: 05-10600
- GNIS feature ID: 2403970

Calion is a city in Union County, Arkansas, United States. The population was 429 at the 2020 census.

== History ==
The town grew around the Ouachita River Lock and Dam, completed by the U.S. Army Corps of Engineers in 1916. It was incorporated in 1921 and named Calion after the first three letters of Calhoun County and the final three letters of Union County.

== Geography ==
According to the United States Census Bureau, the city has a total area of 1.3 square miles (3.4 km^{2}), of which 1.0 square mile (2.6 km^{2}) is land and 0.3 square miles (0.78 km^{2}) (20.77%) is water.

=== Climate ===
The climate in this area is characterized by hot, humid summers and generally mild to cool winters. According to the Köppen Climate Classification system, Calion has a humid subtropical climate, abbreviated "Cfa" on climate maps.

== Demographics ==
Historical population
| Census | Pop. | Note | %± |
|---|---|---|---|
| 1930 | 924 | | — |
| 1940 | 712 | | −22.9% |
| 1950 | 536 | | −24.7% |
| 1960 | 544 | | 1.5% |
| 1970 | 535 | | −1.7% |
| 1980 | 638 | | 19.3% |
| 1990 | 558 | | −12.5% |
| 2000 | 516 | | −7.5% |
| 2010 | 494 | | −4.3% |
| 2020 | 429 | | −13.2% |
| 2025 (est.) | 409 | ▼ | −4.7% |
U.S. Decennial Census; 2018 Estimate

As of the census of 2000, there were 516 people, 219 households, and 146 families residing in the city. The population density was 500.3 inhabitants per square mile (193.2/km^{2}). There were 274 housing units at an average density of 265.7 per square mile (102.6/km^{2}). The racial makeup of the city was 65.70% White, 33.33% Black or African American, 0.58% Native American, and 0.39% from two or more races. 1.55% of the population were Hispanic or Latino of any race.

There were 219 households, out of which 26.5% had children under the age of 18 living with them, 44.7% were married couples living together, 17.4% had a female householder with no husband present, and 33.3% were non-families. 29.7% of all households were made up of individuals, and 14.2% had someone living alone who was 65 years of age or older. The average household size was 2.36 and the average family size was 2.89.

In the city, the population was spread out, with 24.6% under the age of 18, 7.2% from 18 to 24, 24.6% from 25 to 44, 26.0% from 45 to 64, and 17.6% who were 65 years of age or older. The median age was 40 years. For every 100 females, there were 89.7 males. For every 100 females age 18 and over, there were 80.1 males.

The median income for a household in the city was $25,268, and the median income for a family was $26,042. Males had a median income of $28,750 versus $20,000 for females. The per capita income for the city was $13,860. About 25.5% of families and 25.6% of the population were below the poverty line, including 33.9% of those under age 18 and 17.2% of those age 65 or over.

== Education ==
Calion is within the Smackover-Norphlet School District which operates Smackover High School. It was previously in the Norphlet School District, which operated Norphlet Elementary School (PreK-6) and Norphlet High School (grades 7-12). On May 8, 2014, the Arkansas Board of Education (ABE) approved the merger of the Norphlet School District into the Smackover School District.

== Bibliography ==
- Thomas, Charles E. (1986). Jelly Roll, A Black Neighborhood in a Southern Mill Town. Fayetteville, Arkansas: The University of Arkansas Press. ISBN 9781557289827. LCCN 2012005191.
