= Smackover-Norphlet School District =

School district in Arkansas

Smackover-Norphlet School District No. 39 (SNSD), formerly Smackover School District 39, is a school district based in Smackover, Arkansas. It has territory in Union County, Ouachita County, and Columbia County.

The district serves Smackover, Norphlet, Calion, Louann, and Mount Holly.

== History ==
On July 1, 2004 the Mount Holly School District was consolidated into the Smackover district.

On May 8, 2014 the Arkansas Board of Education (ABE) approved the merger of the Norphlet School District into the Smackover School District, effective July 1, 2014, forming the Smackover-Norphlet School District.

In June 2018 superintendent Dave Wilcox resigned and was replaced by John Gross.

== Schools ==
Secondary:

- Smackover High School
- Norphlet Middle School

Primary:

- Smackover Elementary
  - The main school building was built in 1993 while the enrichment building was built in 1980. Circa 2005 the school had 395 students and 23 teachers.
- Norphlet Elementary School

Preschool:

- Smackover Preschool

Former schools:

- After the 2014 merger the original Norphlet Elementary and Norphlet High School (secondary for middle and high school) remained as-is, but for the 2015-2016 school year and beyond the former Norphlet High became a middle school for the entire district while Smackover High became the senior high school for the entire district.
- Mt. Holly Elementary School (acquired in 2004). The Smackover District asked for permission from the Arkansas Board of Education to close the school, as it was classified as an isolated rural area school; it received permission from the ABE in 2006.
