= General Atkinson =

General Atkinson may refer to:

- Anderson W. Atkinson (1923–1992), U.S. Air Force major general
- Leonard Atkinson (1910–1990), British Army major general

== See also ==
- Attorney General Atkinson (disambiguation)
