= Arkansas Museum of Natural Resources =

Museum in Arkansas, United States

- Location in Arkansas Arkansas Museum of Natural Resources (the United States)
- Former name: Arkansas Oil and Brine Museum
- Established: 1986
- Location: Arkansas Highway 7, Smackover, Arkansas, United States
- Coordinates: 33°20′13.2″N 92°42′52.6″W
- Type: Industrial/natural history
- Website: Arkansas Museum of Natural Resources

The Arkansas Museum of Natural Resources is a museum and Arkansas state park in Smackover, Arkansas, in the United States. The museum was formed in the 1980s to tell the history of the petroleum industry and later the brine industry as key economic movements spurred by natural resources in South Arkansas.

== History ==
Prior to the 1921 discovery of oil in nearby El Dorado, Smackover was part of the declining timber and cotton industries. With the discovery of oil in El Dorado on January 10, 1921, the area boomed with geologists looking for more.

The search for oil was then directed north towards the small town of Smackover, near the Ouachita River fault line. On July 29, 1922, the Richardson Number 1 well on the land of Charles Richardson, four miles north of Smackover erupted with new-found oil. Within a year of this discovery, the sleepy town of 100 had boomed to over 25,000.

Though not a leader in oil production, the ten-county area is still producing oil today.

== Features ==
The museum contains a 25,000 square feet (2,300 m^{2}) main exhibition center, operating replicas of oil machinery, a re-created boom-era street scene in Smackover, and a 10,800 square feet (1,000 m^{2}) collection/archive center.

== See also ==
- List of petroleum museums
