= Fordyce High School =

Location
- 100 Redbug Boulevard; Fordyce, Arkansas 71742; United States; 33°49′9″N 92°26′2″W

Information
- School type: Public comprehensive
- Status: Open
- School district: Fordyce School District
- CEEB code: 040790
- NCES School ID: 050621000335
- Teaching staff: 28.70 (on FTE basis)
- Grades: 7–12
- Enrollment: 354 (2023–2024)
- Student to teacher ratio: 12.33
- Education system: ADE Smart Core
- Classes offered: Regular (Core), Career Focus, Advanced Placement (AP)
- Colors: Cardinal and black
- Athletics conference: 3A Region 6 (football); 3A Region 8 (basketball)
- Mascot: Redbug
- Team name: Fordyce Redbugs
- Accreditation: ADE
- Affiliation: Arkansas Activities Association
- Website: www.fordyceschools.org/page/high-school

Fordyce High School (FHS) is a comprehensive public high school located in Fordyce, Arkansas, United States. The school provides secondary education in grades 9 through 12 for students encompassing 220.50 square miles (571.1 km^{2}) of land.

Most of the district (and therefore the high school attendance boundary) is in Dallas County, and there it includes Fordyce, Ivan, and Princeton. The district extends into Calhoun County.

It is the only public high school in Dallas County and the only high school administered by the Fordyce School District.

== Academics ==
The assumed course of study is the Smart Core curriculum developed by the Arkansas Department of Education. Students may engage in regular and Advanced Placement (AP) coursework and exams prior to graduation. Fordyce High School is accredited by ADE.

== Athletics ==
The Fordyce High School mascot and athletic emblem is uniquely the Redbug with cardinal and black serving as the school colors.

For 2012–14, the Fordyce Redbugs compete in interscholastic activities within the 3A Classification administered by the Arkansas Activities Association. The Redbugs play within the 3A Region 6 (football) and 3A Region 8 (basketball) conferences. The Redbugs participate in football, golf (boys/girls), basketball (boys/girls), cheer, baseball, fastpitch softball, tennis (boys/girls), track and field (boys/girls).

- Football: The Redbugs football teams have won Eight state football championships (1930, 1958, 1959, 1960, 1990, 1991, and 2019 and 2020)
- The 1990 and 1991 Redbugs were led by head coach Jim Cox.
- The 2019 Redbugs were led by head coach Tim Rodgers. The team finished with a 13–2 overall record and defeated Junction City on December 14 by a score of 28–6 to win the State title.
- The 2020 Redbugs were led by head coach Tim Rodgers. The team won 15 games to complete a perfect season. The Championship game was played at War Memorial Stadium on December 12 with Fordyce defeating Des Arc 35–32
- The private Clary Training School in Fordyce won the 1911 championship. The football stadium was renamed Redbug Field at Paul Bear Bryant Stadium in honor of the 1931 graduate who led Fordyce to a 1930 perfect season and a state championship and went on to become the winningest college football coach at the time of his retirement.
- Golf: The Redbugs boys golf teams have won five state golf championships (1963, 1964, 1965, 2009 and 2014).
- Tennis: The Redbugs boys tennis teams have won two state tennis championships (1968, 1971).

== Notable people ==
The following are notable people associated with Fordyce High School. If the person was a Fordyce High School student, the number in parentheses indicates the year of graduation; if the person was a faculty or staff member, that person's title and years of association are included:

- Anderson W. Atkinson (1941)—U.S. Air Force Major General
- Jim Benton (coach, 1941)—professional football player; NFL 1940s All-Decade Team
- Paul "Bear" Bryant (1931)—player and coach in College Football Hall of Fame; won six national championships
- Ja'Quez Cross (2021)–college football running back for the Purdue Boilermakers and the Arkansas State Red Wolves
- Raylee Johnson (1988)—NFL professional football player (1993–2004)
- Larry Lacewell (1954)—college coach, athletic director and NFL executive
- Red Parker (coach, 1953–60)—college and high school football coach; led Fordyce to 38-game win streak
- Ray E. Porter (c. 1909)—World War II major general; commanded Fifteenth United States Army
- Kevin Williams (1998)—NFL professional football player, 6-time Pro Bowl selection
