= Tornadoes of 1978 =

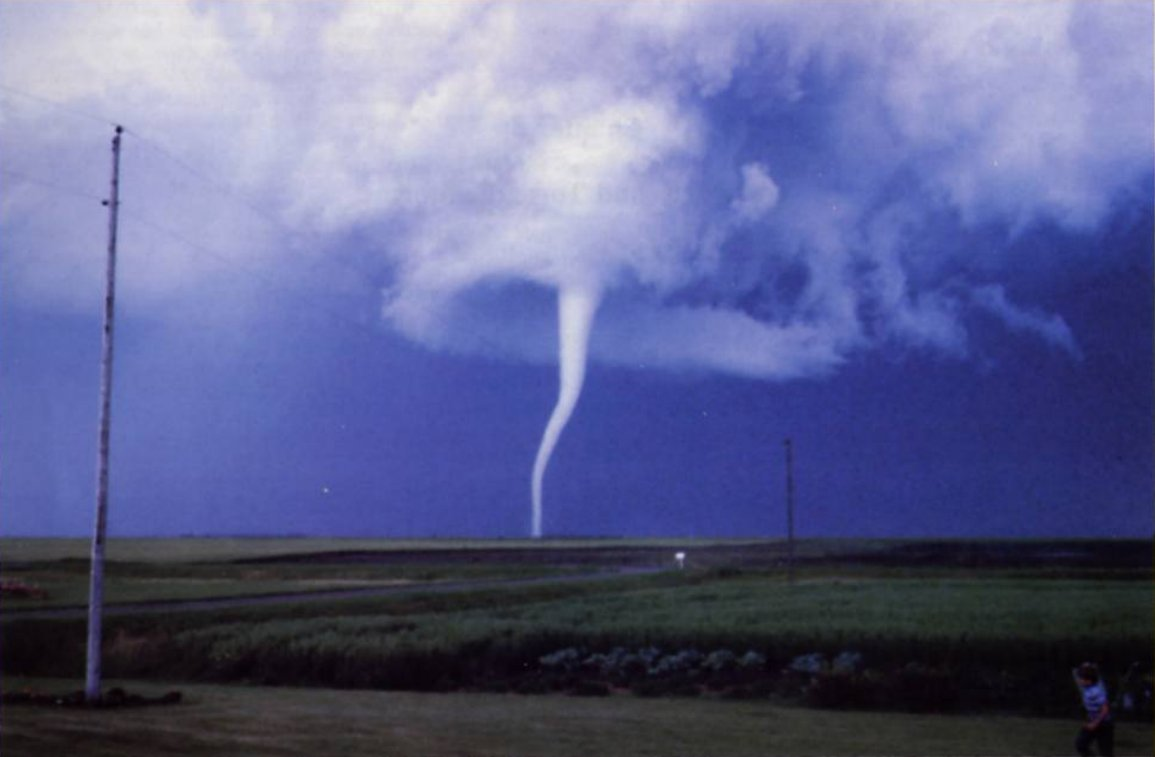
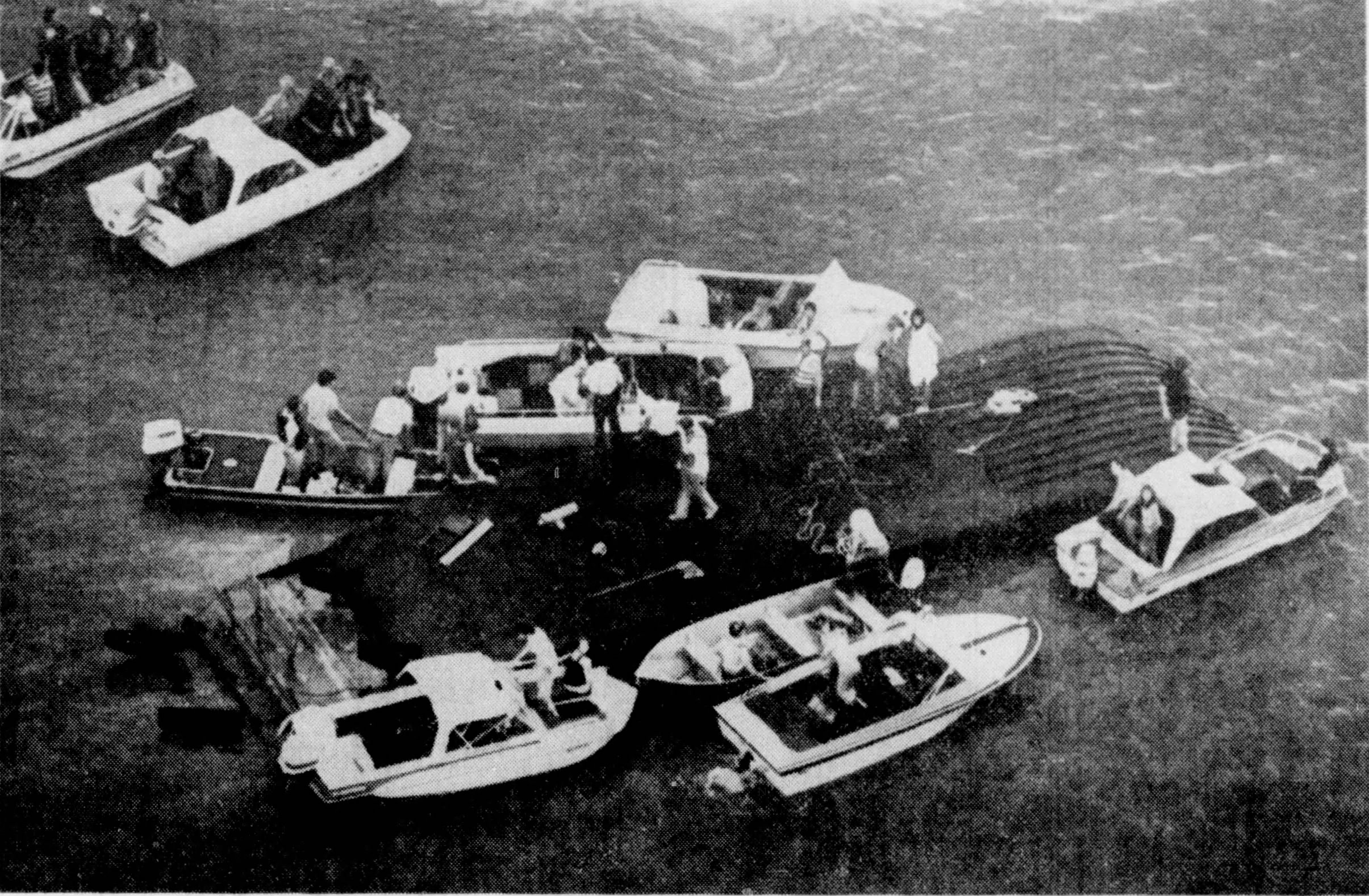
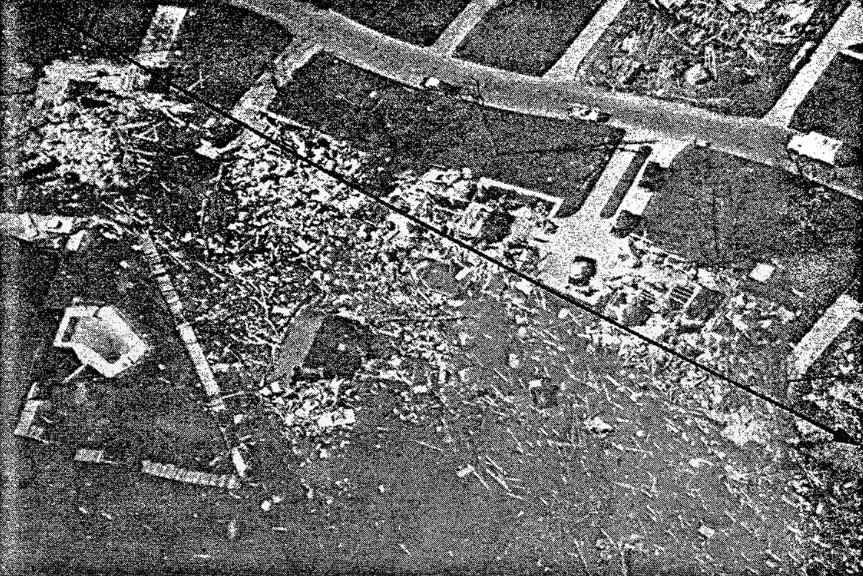
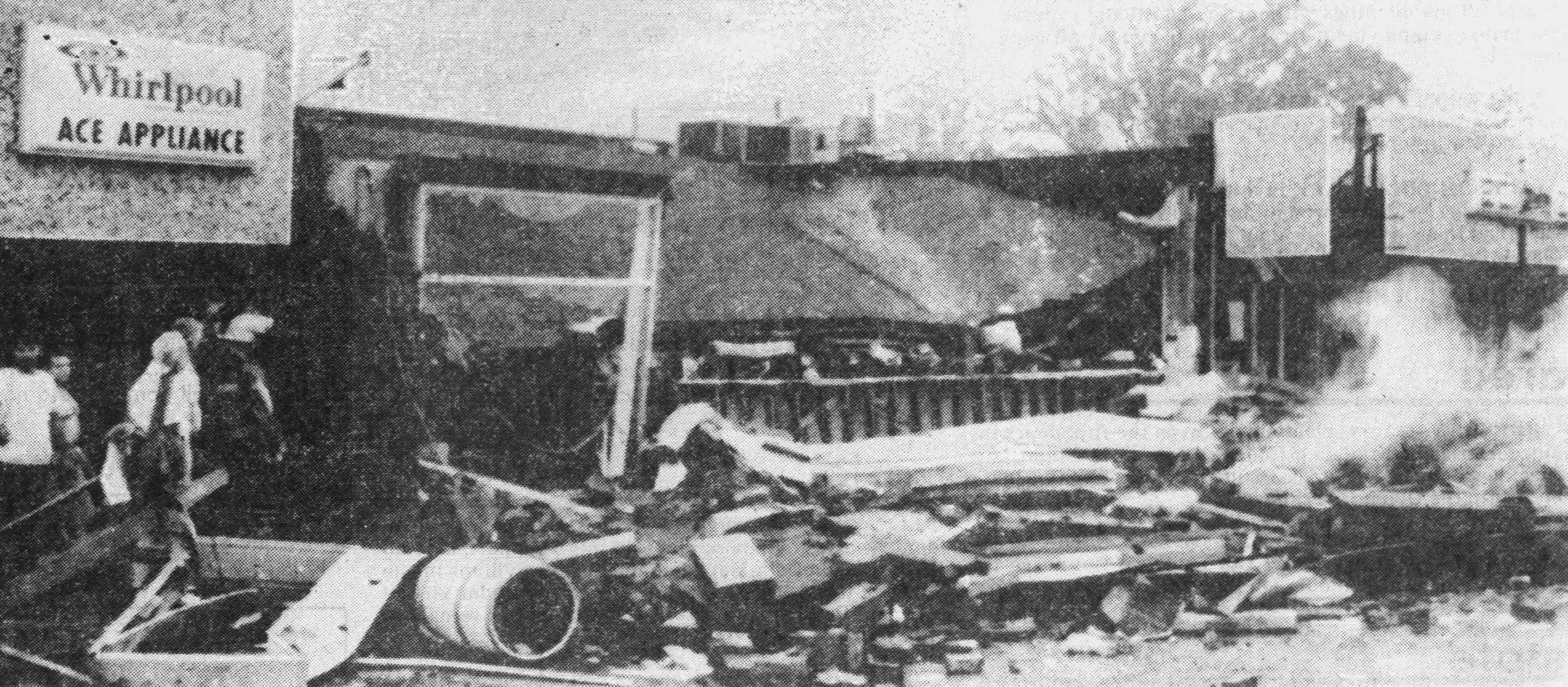
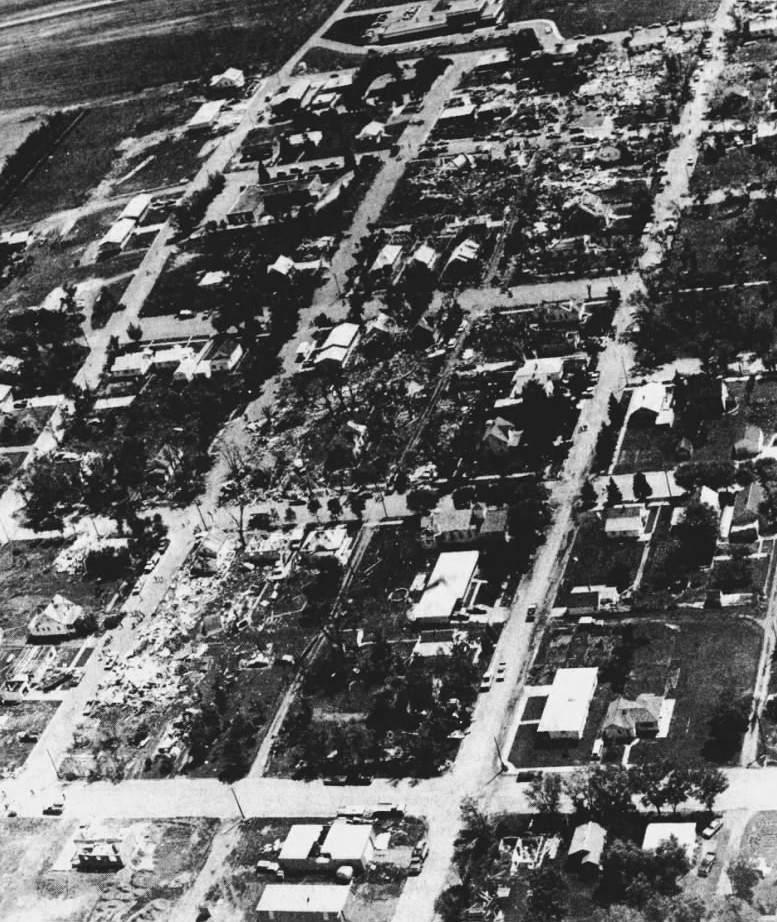
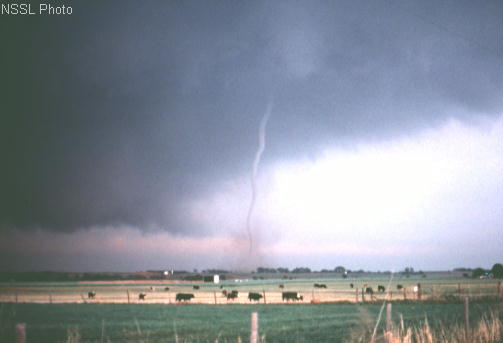
- Clockwise from top: A rope tornado near Osnabrock, North Dakota on July 24; F4 damage to homes in Bossier City, Louisiana after a tornado on December 3; An aerial photo of Elgin, North Dakota after a deadly F4 tornado on July 4; A thin rope tornado near El Reno, Oklahoma on April 30; Damage to businesses in Memphis, Tennessee after an F2 tornado on August 29; The showboat "Whippoorwill" capsized after an F1 tornado on June 17.
- Timespan: January 4 - December 24, 1978
- Maximum rated tornado: F4 tornado: Brighton, Mississippi on April 17; Monticello, Mississippi on April 18; Piedmont, Oklahoma on April 30; Elgin, North Dakota on July 4; Shreveport, Louisiana on December 3
- Tornadoes in U.S.: 595
- Damage (U.S.): Unknown
- Fatalities (U.S.): 53
- Fatalities (worldwide): >236

This page documents the tornadoes and tornado outbreaks of 1978, primarily in the United States. Most tornadoes form in the U.S., although some events may take place internationally. Tornado statistics for older years like this often appear significantly lower than modern years due to fewer reports or confirmed tornadoes.

== Synopsis ==
Fatal United States tornadoes in 1978
- Approximate touchdown location of killer tornadoes in 1978 Summary of tornadoes: January 7 – Arkansas (1 death); January 26 – Virginia (1 death); April 18 – Mississippi (4 deaths); May 4 – Florida (3 deaths); May 26 – Texas (1 death); May 31 – Kansas (3 deaths); June 17 – Kansas (16 deaths); June 25 – Illinois (1 death); July 4 – North Dakota (5 deaths); July 5 – Minnesota (4 deaths); July 23 – Pennsylvania (1 death); July 31 – North Carolina (1 death); August 29 – Mississippi (1 death); September 16 – Iowa (6 deaths); December 3 – Louisiana (2 deaths); December 3 – Arkansas (1 death); December 3 – Louisiana, Arkansas (2 deaths); Total fatalities: 53

Numbers for 1978 were really below average, but on the other hand, the death toll was well above average.

== Events ==
Confirmed tornadoes by Fujita rating
FU	F0	F1	F2	F3	F4	F5	Total
0	242	225	104	19	5	0	595

== January ==
23 tornadoes were reported in the U.S. in January.

== February ==
7 tornadoes were reported in the U.S. in February.

=== February 28 (Japan) ===
The longest tracked tornado in Japan tracked over 25 miles, the tornado started from Kanagawa Prefecture and ends in Chiba Prefecture. The tornado damaged 289 homes and injuring 36 people, the tornado itself was also responsible for Tozai Line train derailment, and the tornado itself was rated around F2-F3.

== March ==
17 tornadoes were reported in the U.S. in March.

=== March 17 (India) ===
A tornado of unknown rating killed 28 people in New Delhi causing considerable damage.

== April ==
107 tornadoes were reported in the U.S. in April, including an F4 that struck Monticello, Mississippi, killing 4 people.

=== April 10 (India) ===
A confirmed but unrated tornado hit Odisha, India, killing at least 150 people, and injuring over 700 people.

=== April 17 (India) ===
A confirmed tornado impacted the villages of Puruna Bandhaguda, Nahangi and Ramchandrapur, Keonjhar District, Odisha and caused at least 100 deaths and 500+ injuries.

=== April 30 ===
A mile wide F4-rated tornado would occur at Piedmont, Oklahoma, under a spectacular supercell formation, and was the first to be captured on videotape.

== May ==
213 tornadoes were confirmed in the U.S. in May.

=== May 4 ===
A minor tornado outbreak caused severe damage in Clearwater, Florida, killing 3 people. The damage from the Clearwater tornado was rated F3. An F2 tornado struck Gainesville, Florida, injuring at least 4 people.

=== May 12 ===
An F3 tornado caused 17 injuries in Gracey, Kentucky.

== June ==
148 tornadoes were reported in the U.S. in June. On June 20, there were three tornadoes, with the strongest being an F2 tornado in Bryans Road, Maryland.

=== June 17 ===
On June 17, an F1 tornado capsized a boat, drowning 16 people.

=== June 25 ===
A minor outbreak of tornadoes occurred in Northern Indiana. An F3 tornado touched down on the northwestern end of Indianapolis. Another F3 damaged buildings in Lafayette, Indiana. An F0 satellite tornado, the satellite tornado of the Lafayette tornado, briefly touched down in a small field at least two miles north of West Lafayette, Indiana.

== July ==
143 tornadoes were reported in the U.S. in July.

=== July 4 ===
A large F4 tornado struck the town of Elgin, North Dakota killing five people and being the deadliest in the state since an EF5 tornado that struck near the town of Enderlin almost 53 years later.

=== July 30 (Canada) ===
Although tornadoes are rare in the polar region of Canada, an F2 tornado struck Yellowknife, toppling a tower and then destroying a transmission tower. Some witnesses said that they saw a huge mile-wide wedge tornado coming. The tornado was the third tornado in the Northwest Territories region since 1960.

=== July 31 ===
Three F2 tornadoes occurred in Dare County, North Carolina and in Frederick County and Howard County in Maryland, killing one person and injuring four, with all casualties caused by the Dare County tornado.

== August ==
65 tornadoes were reported in the U.S. in August.

== September ==
20 tornadoes were reported in the U.S. in September. One notable tornado was a landspout that touched down between the Mason–Dixon line. It was also captured on film.

== October ==
7 tornadoes were reported in the U.S. in October.

=== October 28 (Argentina) ===
An F3 tornado caused severe damage to the city center of Morteros, in central Argentina. leaving five dead and 100 wounded.

== November ==
9 tornadoes were reported in the U.S. in November.

== December ==
30 tornadoes were reported in the U.S. in December.

=== December 3 ===
An F4 started the outbreak when it hit Shreveport, Louisiana, killing 2 people. An F3 killed 2 more people in Tillman, Louisiana, when a mobile home was decimated. An F2 caused considerable damage in El Dorado, Arkansas, killing one person when a woman was crushed by trees in her mobile home.

== See also ==
- Tornado
  - Tornadoes by year
  - Tornado records
  - Tornado climatology
  - Tornado myths
- List of tornado outbreaks
  - List of F5 and EF5 tornadoes
  - List of North American tornadoes and tornado outbreaks
  - List of 21st-century Canadian tornadoes and tornado outbreaks
  - List of European tornadoes and tornado outbreaks
  - List of tornadoes and tornado outbreaks in Asia
  - List of Southern Hemisphere tornadoes and tornado outbreaks
  - List of tornadoes striking downtown areas
- Tornado intensity
  - Fujita scale
  - Enhanced Fujita scale
