= Tucker School (Tucker, Arkansas) =

- U.S. National Register of Historic Places
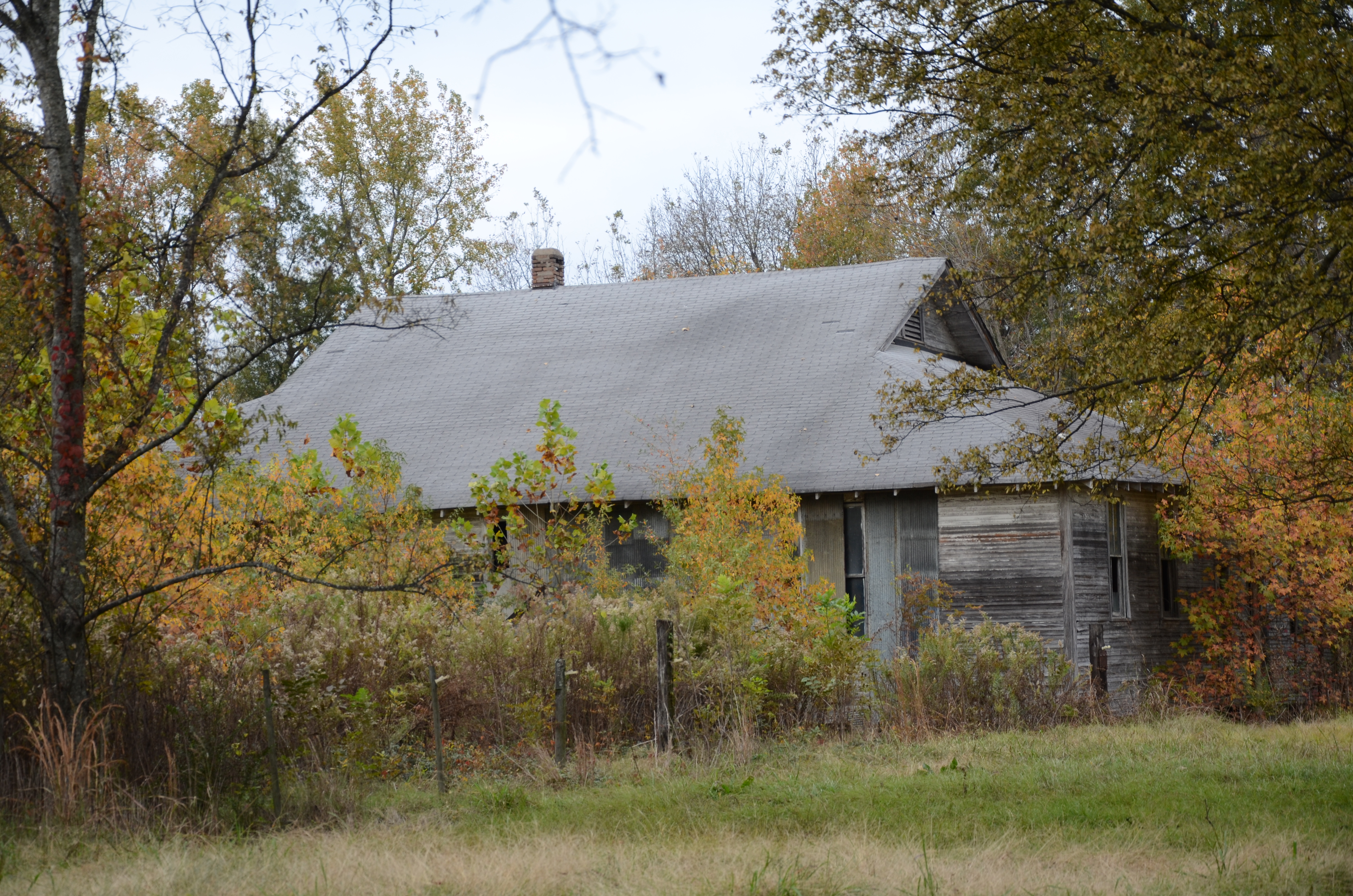

- Location within Arkansas Location within the United States
- Location: Vandalsen Dr., Tucker, Arkansas
- Coordinates: 34°26′8″N 91°57′21″W
- Area: 1.3 acres (0.53 ha)
- Built: 1915
- Architectural style: Bungalow/craftsman
- NRHP reference No.: 05000538
- Added to NRHP: June 10, 2005

The Tucker School is a historic school building on Vandalsen Drive (one block west of Arkansas Highway 15) in Tucker, Arkansas. It is a single-story wood-frame structure, with a hip roof, weatherboard siding, and a foundation of brick piers. On the building's west side, a gable-roofed vestibule projects, with a shed-roof porch in front of it, sheltering the main entrance. It was built about 1915 to serve the area's white students (African-Americans would not get a school facility until a Rosenwald school was built in 1925), and was apparently in use as a school until the early 1960s, when it was converted into a church.

The building was listed on the National Register of Historic Places in 2005. At that time, it stood vacant and boarded up.

== See also ==
- National Register of Historic Places listings in Jefferson County, Arkansas
