= Arkansas Highway 294 =

State highway in Arkansas, United States

Highway 294
- AR 294 highlighted in red

Route information
- Maintained by ArDOT
- Length: 8.21 mi (13.21 km)

Major junctions
- West end: AR 161 in Jacksonville
- East end: AR 15 / AR 89 in Furlow

Location
- Country: United States
- State: Arkansas
- Counties: Pulaski, Lonoke

Highway system
- Arkansas Highway System; Interstate; US; State; Business; Spurs; Suffixed; Scenic; Heritage
← AR 293	→ AR 295

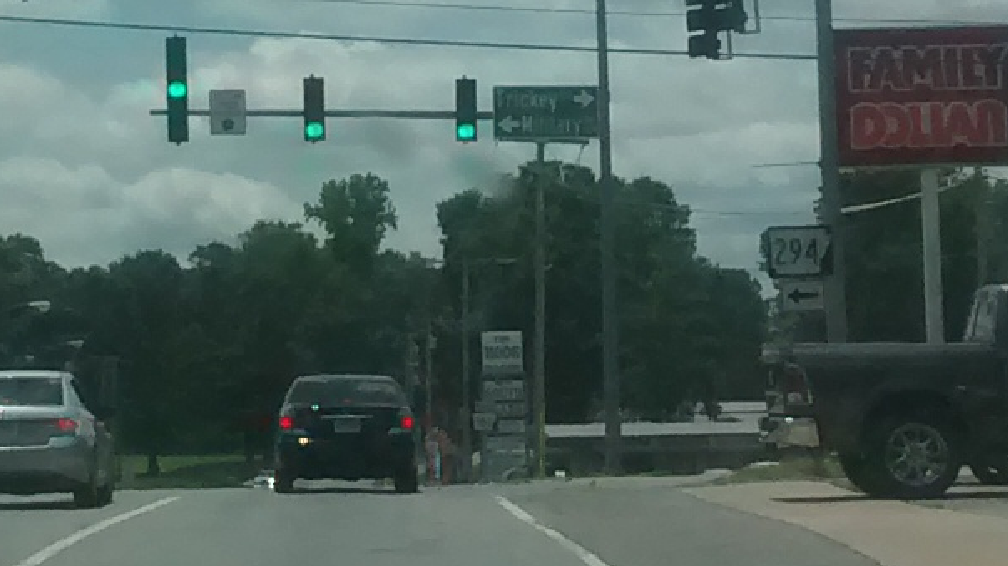
Arkansas Highway 294 in Jacksonville

Highway 294 (AR 294, Ark. 294 and Hwy. 294) is an east–west highway in central Arkansas. Its western terminus is at an intersection with AR 161 in the city of Jacksonville. Its eastern terminus is at an intersection with AR 15 and AR 89 in the unincorporated community of Furlow.

== Route description ==
The route begins at a T-intersection with AR 161 (South First Street) in Jacksonville and travels northeast along Military Road. It turns due east and leaves the city while crossing from Pulaski County into Lonoke County. East of the county line, AR 294 bends to the southeast and passes through the unincorporated community of South Bend. Upon leaving South Bend, the route turns due south for about 0.5 miles (0.80 km), then back to the east. It continues in this direction for about 1.5 miles (2.4 km) before bending slightly southeast toward Furlow. Finally, AR 294 enters Furlow, where it meets its eastern terminus at an intersection with AR 15 and AR 89. From this intersection, AR 15 heads south while AR 89 heads north and east.

== Major intersections ==
County	Location	mi	km	Destinations	Notes
Pulaski	Jacksonville	0.00	0.00	AR 161 (South First Street)	Western terminus
Lonoke	Furlow	8.21	13.21	AR 15 south / AR 89 to I-40 – Lonoke, Cabot	Eastern terminus; northern terminus of AR 15
1.000 mi = 1.609 km; 1.000 km = 0.621 mi
