= South Arkansas =

Coordinates: 33.2°N 92.7°W

- Region
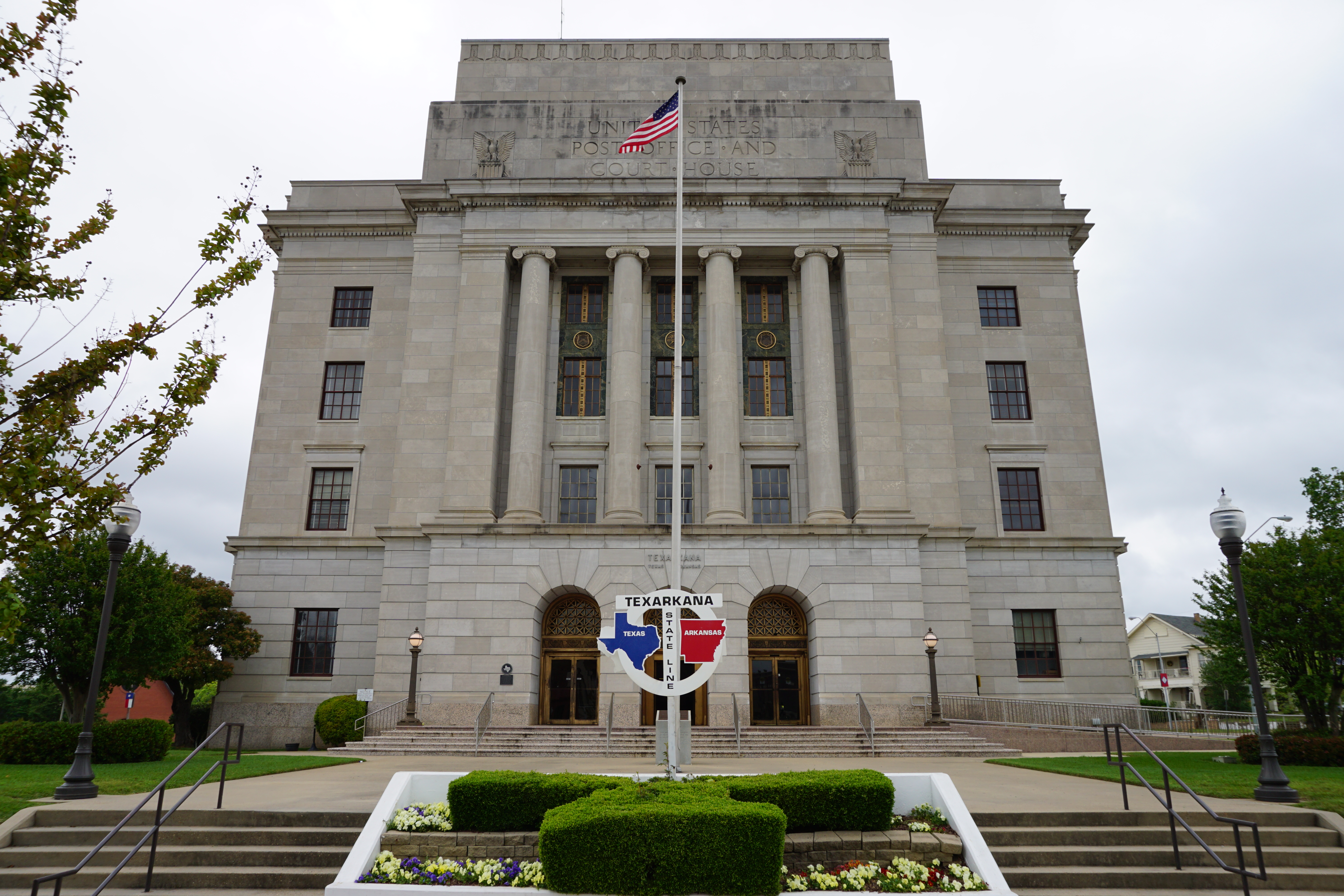
- Texarkana

- South Arkansas' 15 counties highlighted in red.
- Country: United States
- State: Arkansas
- Largest city: Texarkana
- Other Municipalities: Arkansas City; Ashdown; Bearden; Camden; East Camden; El Dorado; Hope; Junction City; Kingsland; Lake Village; Louann; Magnolia; Monticello; Prescott; Rison; Smackover; Texarkana; Urbana; Strong; Waldo

South Arkansas lies within the southernmost portions of Arkansas Gulf Coastal Plain and Delta regions. It encompasses the lower 15 counties of the state. The region is historically associated with timber, oil, and agriculture, and culturally shares many characteristics with neighboring areas of North Louisiana and East Texas.

== History ==
In the 1920s, nationwide attention focused on South Arkansas when the Smackover Field was ranked first among the nation's oil fields. For five months in 1925, the 40-square-mile (100 km^{2}) Smackover Field was the focal point of one of the wildest mineral booms in North America. Today, south Arkansas's oil fields produce petroleum throughout a 10-county area.

Columbia and Union counties also stretch over one of the largest brine reserves in the world. Bromine is derived from brine, or saltwater, and local companies play an international role in the commercialization of bromine and its many applications.

== Counties ==
- Ashley County
- Bradley County
- Calhoun County
- Chicot County
- Cleveland County
- Columbia County
- Desha County
- Drew County
- Hempstead County
- Lafayette County
- Little River County
- Miller County
- Nevada County
- Ouachita County
- Union County

== Important cities and towns ==
- Arkansas City
- Ashdown
- Bearden
- Camden
- East Camden
- El Dorado
- Hope
- Junction City
- Kingsland
- Lake Village
- Louann
- Magnolia
- Monticello
- Prescott
- Rison
- Smackover
- Texarkana (largest city)
- Urbana
- Strong
- Waldo
