= Furlow, Arkansas =

- Unincorporated community
- Location within Arkansas Location within the United States
- Coordinates: 34°49′59″N 91°58′50″W
- Country: United States
- State: Arkansas
- County: Lonoke
- Township: Furlow
- Elevation: 259 ft (79 m)
- Time zone: UTC-6 (Central (CST))
  - Summer (DST): UTC-5 (CDT)
- GNIS feature ID: 57781

Furlow is an unincorporated community in Lonoke County, Arkansas, United States. The community is located west of Lonoke and is surrounded by fish farms.

The community is located at the crossroads of Arkansas Highway 15 south, Arkansas Highway 89 north and east, and Arkansas Highway 294 west.
