= Felsenthal, Arkansas =

- Town
- Location of Felsenthal in Union County, Arkansas.
- Coordinates: 33°03′32″N 92°09′12″W
- Country: United States
- State: Arkansas
- County: Union

Area
  - Total: 1.66 sq mi (4.30 km^{2})
  - Land: 1.47 sq mi (3.82 km^{2})
  - Water: 0.19 sq mi (0.48 km^{2})
- Elevation: 82 ft (25 m)

Population (2020)
  - Total: 85
  - Estimate (2025): 83 ▼
  - Density: 57.6/sq mi (22.24/km^{2})
- Time zone: UTC-6 (Central (CST))
  - Summer (DST): UTC-5 (CDT)
- FIPS code: 05-23320
- GNIS feature ID: 2406496

Felsenthal is a town in Union County, Arkansas, United States. The population was 85 at the 2020 census, down from 150 at the 2010 census. It lays adjacent to the Ouachita River in the southeastern corner of Union County.

== Geography ==
According to the United States Census Bureau, the town has a total area of 4.4 km^{2} (1.7 sq mi), of which 3.8 km^{2} (1.5 sq mi) is land and 0.6 km^{2} (0.23 sq mi) (13.10%) is water.

== Demographics ==
Historical population
Census	Pop.	Note	%±
1920	267		—
1930	208		−22.1%
1970	158		—
1980	220		39.2%
1990	95		−56.8%
2000	152		60.0%
2010	150		−1.3%
2020	85		−43.3%
U.S. Decennial Census; 2014 Estimate

As of the census of 2000, there were 152 people, 70 households, and 44 families residing in the town. The population density was 40.2 people /km^{2} (104 people/mi^{2}). There were 256 housing units at an average density of 67.7 units /km^{2} (175 units/mi^{2}). The racial makeup of the town was 79.61% White, 16.45% Black or African American, 2.63% from other races, and 1.32% from two or more races. 3.95% of the population were Hispanic or Latino of any race.

There were 70 households, out of which 17.1% had children under the age of 18 living with them, 57.1% were married couples living together, 4.3% had a female householder with no husband present, and 37.1% were non-families. 30.0% of all households were made up of individuals, and 10.0% had someone living alone who was 65 years of age or older. The average household size was 2.17 and the average family size was 2.68.

In the town, the population was spread out, with 14.5% under the age of 18, 5.3% from 18 to 24, 22.4% from 25 to 44, 37.5% from 45 to 64, and 20.4% who were 65 years of age or older. The median age was 49 years. For every 100 females, there were 90.0 males. For every 100 females age 18 and over, there were 97.0 males. The median income for a household in the town was $31,000, and the median income for a family was $35,417. Males had a median income of $45,833 versus $17,292 for females. The per capita income for the town was $16,975. About 2.4% of families and 11.5% of the population were below the poverty line, including 16.0% of those under the age of 18 and 21.2% of those 65 or over.
