= Fordyce School District =

School district in Arkansas, United States

Address
- 104 College Street Fordyce, Arkansas, 71742; United States

District information
- Type: Public
- Grades: PreK–12
- NCES District ID: 0506210

Students and staff
- Students: 770
- Teachers: 64.9
- Staff: 68.5
- Student–teacher ratio: 11.86

Other information
- Website: fordyceschools.org

Fordyce School District 39 is a public school district in Fordyce, Arkansas, United States.

The school district encompasses 220.50 square miles (571.1 km^{2}) of land, in Dallas County and Calhoun County.

Most of the district is in Dallas County, and there it includes Fordyce, Ivan, and Princeton. The district extends into Calhoun County.

In 2014 Albert Snow, the superintendent of the Norphlet School District, was to become the Fordyce superintendent.

== History ==
In 1965 the Dallas County School District dissolved, with a portion of the students going to the Fordyce school district.

== Schools ==
- Fordyce Elementary School
- Fordyce High School
