= Norphlet High School =

Location
- 600 School Street; Norphlet, Arkansas 71759; United States
- Coordinates: 33°18′48″N 92°39′39″W

Information
- Status: Open
- School district: Smackover-Norphlet School District (2014-2015); Norphlet School District (-2014)
- NCES School ID: 051170000891
- Principal: Keith Coleman
- Grades: 7–12
- Enrollment: 210 (2010–11)
- Education system: ADE Smart Core curriculum
- Classes offered: Core, Career Focus, Advanced Placement
- Colors: Red and white
- Athletics conference: 2A 7 (2012–14)
- Mascot: Leopard
- Team name: Norphlet Leopards
- Website: web.archive.org/*/http://norphlet.k12.ar.us/

Norphlet High School was a junior and senior school located in Norphlet, Arkansas, United States. It was one of six public high schools in Union County and was the only high school that is administered by the Norphlet School District; for its final year, the 2014-2015 school year, it was a part of the Smackover-Norphlet School District.

== History ==
Each graduating class generally ranged from 25 to 50.

It was previously in the Norphlet School District. In the 2014-2015 school year the Norphlet district merged with the Smackover district, but for one more year the schools were to remain as they were. In the 2015-2016 school year the former Norphlet High became a middle school for the entire school district while Smackover High School became the senior high school for the entire district.

== Academics ==
The assumed course of study follows the Smart Core curriculum developed by the Arkansas Department of Education (ADE), which requires students complete 22 units prior to graduation. Students may select from regular coursework and exams and Advanced Placement (AP) courses and exams with the opportunity to obtain college credit.

== Athletics ==
The Norphlet High School mascot and athletic emblem is the Leopard with red and white serving as the school colors.

For 2012–14, the Norphlet Leopards compete in the 2A classification under the 2A Region 7 Conference as administered by the Arkansas Activities Association. The Leopards compete in football, baseball, basketball (boys/girls), cheer, baseball, and softball.

- Basketball: The girls basketball team won the 2A classification state basketball championship in 2013.
