= Attorney General Atkinson =

Attorney General Atkinson may refer to:

- John Atkinson, Baron Atkinson (1844–1932), Attorney-General for Ireland
- Michael Atkinson (politician) (born 1958), Attorney-General of South Australia

== See also ==
- General Atkinson (disambiguation)
