= Mount Holly School District =

Defunct school district in Arkansas, United States

The Mount Holly School District was a school district headquartered in Mount Holly, Arkansas.

On July 1, 2004, the district was consolidated into the Smackover School District.
