= Mount Holly, Arkansas =

- Census-designated place
- Location within Arkansas Location within the United States
- Coordinates: 33°18′11″N 92°57′14″W
- Country: United States
- State: Arkansas
- County: Union
- Elevation: 259 ft (79 m)

Population (2020)
  - Total: 123
- Time zone: UTC-6 (Central (CST))
  - Summer (DST): UTC-5 (CDT)
- ZIP code: 71758
- Area code: 870
- GNIS feature ID: 2805664

Mount Holly is an unincorporated community and census-designated place (CDP) in Union County, Arkansas, United States. Mount Holly is located at the junction of Arkansas highways 57 and 160, 18 miles (29 km) west-northwest of El Dorado. Mount Holly has a post office with ZIP code 71758. It was first listed as a CDP in the 2020 census with a population of 123.

== Education ==
The Smackover-Norphlet School District (formerly the Smackover School District) operates public schools serving the community, including Smackover High School.

It was previously served by the Mount Holly School District, which operated Mt. Holly Elementary School and Mount Holly High School. On July 1, 2004, the former Mt. Holly district was consolidated into the Smackover district. For a period the district continued operating Mt. Holly Elementary. The Smackover district asked for permission from the Arkansas Board of Education to end operations of the Mount Holly School, and received the permission in 2006.

== Demographics ==
Historical population
Census	Pop.	Note	%±
2020	123		—
U.S. Decennial Census; 2020

=== 2020 census ===
Mount Hollyn CDP, Arkansas – Demographic Profile (NH = Non-Hispanic) Note: the US Census treats Hispanic/Latino as an ethnic category. This table excludes Latinos from the racial categories and assigns them to a separate category. Hispanics/Latinos may be of any race.
Race / Ethnicity	Pop 2020	% 2020
White alone (NH)	102	82.93%
Black or African American alone (NH)	5	4.07%
Native American or Alaska Native alone (NH)	0	0.00%
Asian alone (NH)	2	1.63%
Pacific Islander alone (NH)	0	0.00%
Some Other Race alone (NH)	0	0.00%
Mixed Race/Multi-Racial (NH)	5	4.07%
Hispanic or Latino (any race)	9	7.32%
Total	123	100.00%

== Notable people ==
- Thomas Chipman McRae, United States House of Representatives (1885 to 1903), 26th governor of Arkansas.
- Charles Portis, novelist, author of True Grit was raised in Mount Holly
