= 1978 Pomona Lake tornado =

1978 tornado in Kansas, USA

1978 Pomona Lake Tornado
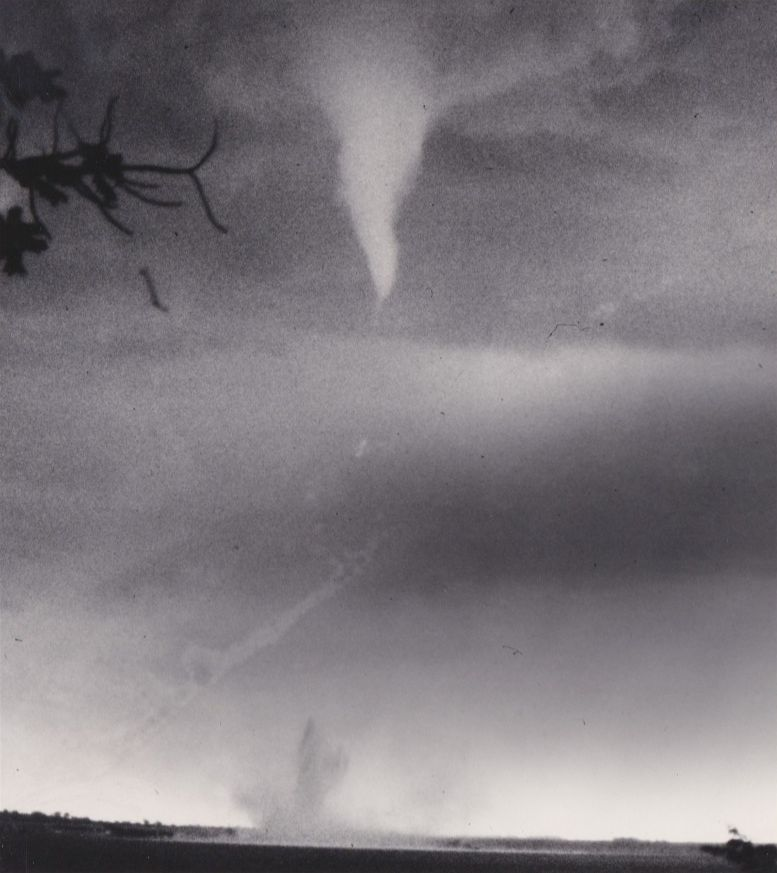
- The tornado as seen from the shore of Pomona Lake.

Meteorological history
- Date: June 17, 1978
- Formed: June 17, 1978 , 7:00 p.m. CDT (UTC−05:00)
- Dissipated: June 17, 1978 , 7:15 p.m. CDT (UTC−05:00)
- Duration: 15 minutes

F1 tornado
- on the Fujita scale
- Highest winds: 100 mph (160 km/h)

Overall effects
- Fatalities: 16
- Injuries: 3
- Damage: $250,000
- Part of the Tornadoes of 1978

The 1978 Pomona Lake tornado, also known as the Whippoorwill Disaster, was a deadly tornado that struck Osage County, Kansas on June 17, 1978. The tornado, which was on the ground for 8 miles (13 km), struck a tourist boat called the Whippoorwill, causing it to capsize and drowning 16 out of the 58 passengers and crew. In the United States, the tornado is the deadliest F1 rated tornado on the Fujita scale.

== Storm history ==
The tornado formed at 7 p.m. (CST) and moved erratically eastward for 8 miles before dissipating near the small town of Michigan Valley. The tornado was too small to be detected on radar, and eyewitnesses stated that the tornado was only 150 yards wide but had a multiple vortex structure. Some reported another tornado in the area although it was not confirmed by the National Weather Service.

== Impact ==
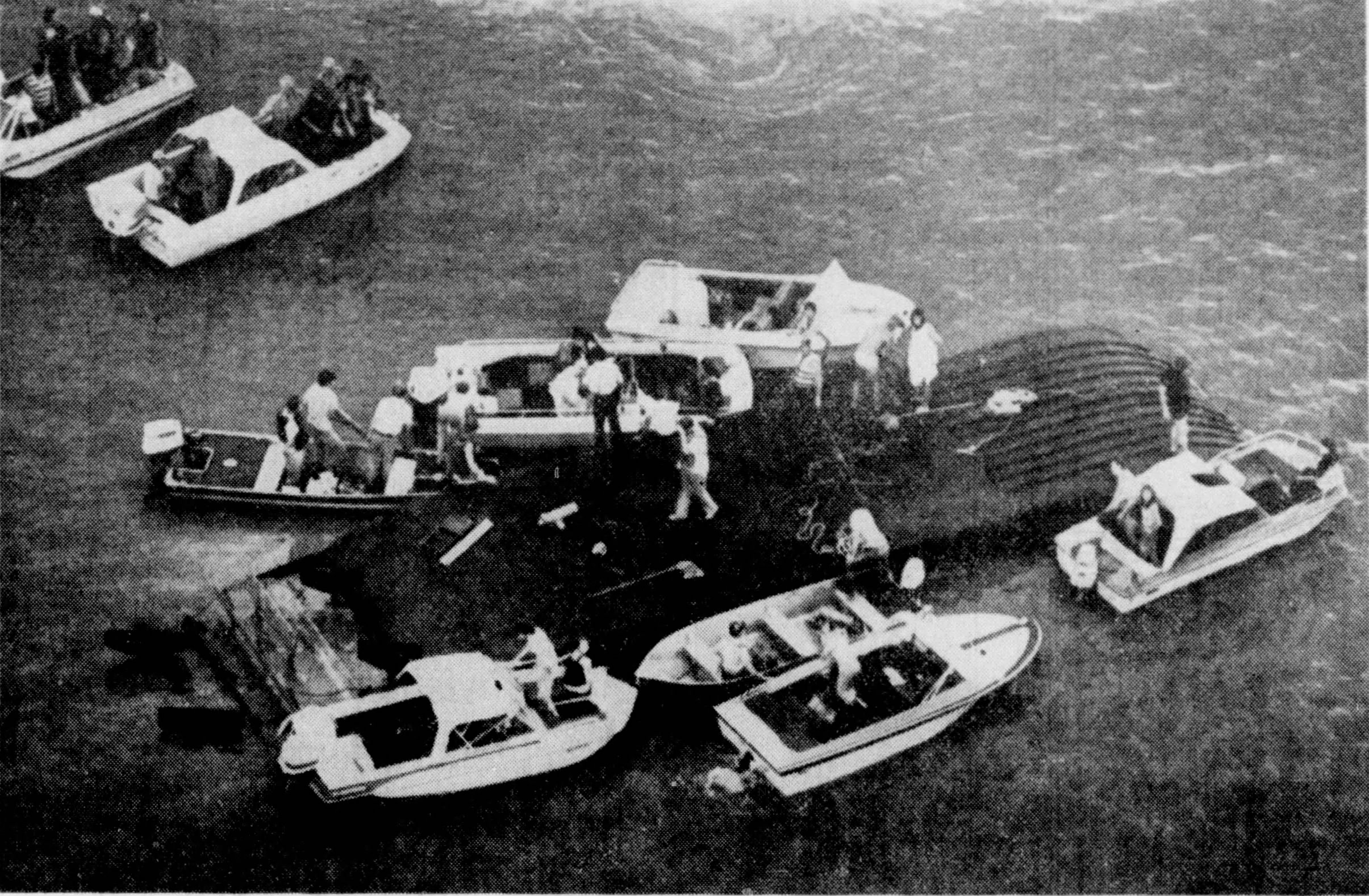
Rescue boats surrounding the capsized showboat Whippoorwill

At the time of the tornado, the National Weather Service issued a severe thunderstorm watch for Franklin County, Kansas. At the same time, the showboat Whippoorwill left its mooring at Pomona Lake carrying 58 passengers and crew. Eyewitnesses of the disaster stated that they saw the tornado forming at the west end of the lake. The tornado strengthened as it raced toward the boat. The tornado struck the boat and capsized it before moving on to land.

After the tornado moved away, rescuers began to pick survivors off from the hull of the capsized ship. One rescuer, the owner of Lighthouse Bay Marina, and diver, Lawrence Stadel, dove under the boat and found two more survivors, trapped in air pockets. The tornado that capsized the boat later caused minimal damage to mobile homes before dissipating. In total, 16 people were killed in the incident, including three faculty members from the Emporia State University School of Library and Information Management.

== Aftermath ==
The owners of the ship closed down their dinner theater a few years after the disaster. The Whippoorwill itself was repaired and converted into a houseboat dubbed Georgia May. In 2005, while docked in shallow water, a small fire caused the boat to sink. It was then towed to a spot near Vassar, Kansas and left to rust. The boat was sold in 2016 to two brothers, Matt and Josh Abramovitz, who intended to repair it and put it back into service by offering day cruises. The boat was sold again in 2022 to Innovative Technology Services, Inc. and rechristened as the HHS Host of Sparrows. It is currently in dry dock at the Lake Perry Reservoir undergoing remodel to have safety features added and become a Pirate themed commercial charter boat to be launched in Spring of 2024.

== See also ==
- List of North American tornadoes and tornado outbreaks
- Tornadoes of 1978
