= Anderson W. Atkinson =

United States Air Force general

Anderson W. Atkinson (1923 – March 30, 1992) was a major general in the United States Air Force.

== Biography ==
Atkinson was born in Fordyce, Arkansas, in 1923. He graduated from Fordyce High School in 1941 and attended Syracuse University for one year before transferring to the United States Military Academy. In 1956, he graduated from the University of Michigan with a master's degree in aeronautical engineering. Atkinson died on March 30, 1992.

== Career ==
Atkinson graduated from the United States Military Academy in 1946 and was commissioned an officer in the United States Army. He then began flight training for the North American P-51 Mustang at Williams Air Force Base and later went to Ajo, Arizona, for gunnery training. In November of that year, Atkinson was assigned to the 63d Fighter Squadron of the 56th Fighter Group at Selfridge Air Force Base, flying the P-51 and Lockheed P-80 Shooting Star. In 1949, he was assigned to the 66th Fighter Squadron of the 57th Fighter Group at Elmendorf Air Force Base, where he flew the North American F-86 Sabre, Northrop F-89 Scorpion and Lockheed F-94 Starfire. Atkinson later joined the newly created Air Force.

In 1960, Atkinson began working in the Office of the Deputy Chief of Staff, Operations of the Air Force. He was later assigned to the United States Air Forces in Europe before graduating from the Industrial College of the Armed Forces in 1967.

That year, Atkinson also became Deputy Commander for Operations of the 15th Tactical Fighter Wing at MacDill Air Force Base. In 1968, he was deployed to serve in the Vietnam War. He was first assigned to the Seventh Air Force at Tan Son Nhut Air Base. Later, he was transferred to the 366th Tactical Fighter Wing at Da Nang Air Base, where he flew the McDonnell Douglas F-4 Phantom II.

After returning from overseas, Atkinson was stationed at Webb Air Force Base. In 1971, he transferred to Sheppard Air Force Base.

From 1973 to 1978, he was assigned to the Office of the Joint Chiefs of Staff. In 1978, he became Assistant Vice Director for Attaches and Training of the Defense Intelligence Agency. Atkinson retired in 1980.

Awards he received during his career include the Defense Superior Service Medal, the Legion of Merit with two oak leaf clusters, the Distinguished Flying Cross, the Bronze Star Medal, the Air Medal with five oak leaf clusters, the Air Force Commendation Medal with two oak leaf clusters and the Armed Forces Honor Medal of South Vietnam.
