= Ivan, Arkansas =

- Census-designated place
- Location within Arkansas Location within the United States
- Coordinates: 33°54′07″N 92°26′00″W
- Country: United States
- State: Arkansas
- County: Dallas
- Elevation: 233 ft (71 m)

Population (2020)
  - Total: 135
- Time zone: UTC-6 (Central (CST))
  - Summer (DST): UTC-5 (CDT)
- ZIP code: 71748
- Area code: 870
- GNIS feature ID: 2805654

Ivan is an unincorporated community and census-designated place (CDP) in Dallas County, Arkansas, United States. Ivan is located along U.S. Route 167, 7 miles (11 km) north of Fordyce. Ivan has a post office with ZIP code 71748. It was first listed as a CDP in the 2020 census with a population of 135.

== Demographics ==
Historical population
Census	Pop.	Note	%±
2020	135		—
U.S. Decennial Census; 2020

=== 2020 census ===
Ivan CDP, Arkansas – Racial and ethnic composition Note: the US Census treats Hispanic/Latino as an ethnic category. This table excludes Latinos from the racial categories and assigns them to a separate category. Hispanics/Latinos may be of any race.
Race / Ethnicity (NH = Non-Hispanic)	Pop 2020	% 2020
White alone (NH)	116	85.93%
Black or African American alone (NH)	11	8.15%
Native American or Alaska Native alone (NH)	0	0.00%
Asian alone (NH)	0	0.00%
Pacific Islander alone (NH)	0	0.00%
Some Other Race alone (NH)	0	0.00%
Mixed Race or Multi-Racial (NH)	2	1.48%
Hispanic or Latino (any race)	6	4.44%
Total	135	100.00%

== Education ==
It is in the Fordyce School District, which operates Fordyce High School.
