= Norphlet, Arkansas =

- City
- Location of Norphlet in Union County, Arkansas.
- Coordinates: 33°19′12″N 92°39′43″W
- Country: United States
- State: Arkansas
- County: Union

Area
  - Total: 2.04 sq mi (5.29 km^{2})
  - Land: 2.04 sq mi (5.29 km^{2})
  - Water: 0 sq mi (0.00 km^{2})
- Elevation: 161 ft (49 m)

Population (2020)
  - Total: 766
  - Estimate (2025): 717 ▼
  - Density: 375/sq mi (144.7/km^{2})
- Time zone: UTC-6 (Central (CST))
  - Summer (DST): UTC-5 (CDT)
- ZIP code: 71759
- Area code: 870
- FIPS code: 05-50060
- GNIS feature ID: 2404387
- Website: www.cityofnorphlet.com

Norphlet is a city in Union County, Arkansas, United States. As of the 2020 census, Norphlet had a population of 766.

== History ==
Norphlet was called Jesse in the 1880s. The Post Office was created in 1891. The town originally centered around William G. Miles's Sawmill. The town was named for Nauphlet Goodwin. The name of the town was misspelled by the Postal Department when the Post Office was created. The word, Nauphlet, was written in long hand and looked like Norphlet to the people in the Postal Department. So, the papers for the post office were issued for Norphlet.

Oil was discovered at Norphlet in 1922. The formation in which the oil was discovered led to 'Norphlet' becoming a geological term - a Norphlet Formation is a Jurassic Sandstone Formation.

== Geography ==
According to the United States Census Bureau, the city has a total area of 2.1 square miles (5.4 km^{2}), all land.

== Demographics ==
Historical population
Census	Pop.	Note	%±
1930	1,063		—
1940	695		−34.6%
1950	653		−6.0%
1960	459		−29.7%
1970	755		64.5%
1980	756		0.1%
1990	706		−6.6%
2000	822		16.4%
2010	844		2.7%
2020	766		−9.2%
2025 (est.)	717	▼	−6.4%
U.S. Decennial Census

As of the census of 2000, there were 822 people, 311 households, and 236 families residing in the city. The population density was 398.0 inhabitants per square mile (153.7/km^{2}). There were 343 housing units at an average density of 166.1 per square mile (64.1/km^{2}). The racial make-up of the city was 94.77% White, 3.16% Black or African American, 0.36% Native American, 1.09% from other races, and 0.61% from two or more races. 2.19% of the population were Hispanic or Latino of any race.

There were 311 households, out of which 38.6% had children under the age of 18 living with them, 63.7% were married couples living together, 9.6% had a female householder with no husband present, and 24.1% were non-families. 22.2% of all households were made up of individuals, and 11.6% had someone living alone who was 65 years of age or older. The average household size was 2.64 and the average family size was 3.11.

In the city, the population was spread out, with 28.7% under the age of 18, 7.4% from 18 to 24, 28.7% from 25 to 44, 21.9% from 45 to 64, and 13.3% who were 65 years of age or older. The median age was 36 years. For every 100 females, there were 89.0 males. For every 100 females age 18 and over, there were 86.0 males.

The median income for a household in the city was $39,063, and the median income for a family was $45,500. Males had a median income of $38,214 versus $23,864 for females. The per capita income for the city was $15,754. About 7.5% of families and 10.1% of the population were below the poverty line, including 12.7% of those under age 18 and 4.2% of those age 65 or over.

== Education ==
=== Public education ===
Public education for early childhood, elementary and secondary school students is primarily provided by the Smackover-Norphlet School District, which includes Norphlet Elementary School, Norphlet Middle School, and Smackover High School.

The community was previously served by the Norphlet School District, which operated Norphlet Elementary School (PreK-6) and Norphlet High School (grades 7–12). On May 8, 2014, the Arkansas Board of Education (ABE) approved the merger of the Norphlet School District into the Smackover School District. For the 2014–2015 school year the original Norphlet Elementary and Norphlet High remained as-is, but for the 2015–2016 school year and beyond the former Norphlet High became a middle school for the entire district while Smackover High became the senior high school for the entire district.

=== Public library ===
The Norphlet Public Library is a branch library of the Barton Library System, which is based in El Dorado.
