= Sherrill United Methodist Church =

Historic church in Arkansas, United States

- Sherrill Methodist Episcopal Church, South
- U.S. National Register of Historic Places
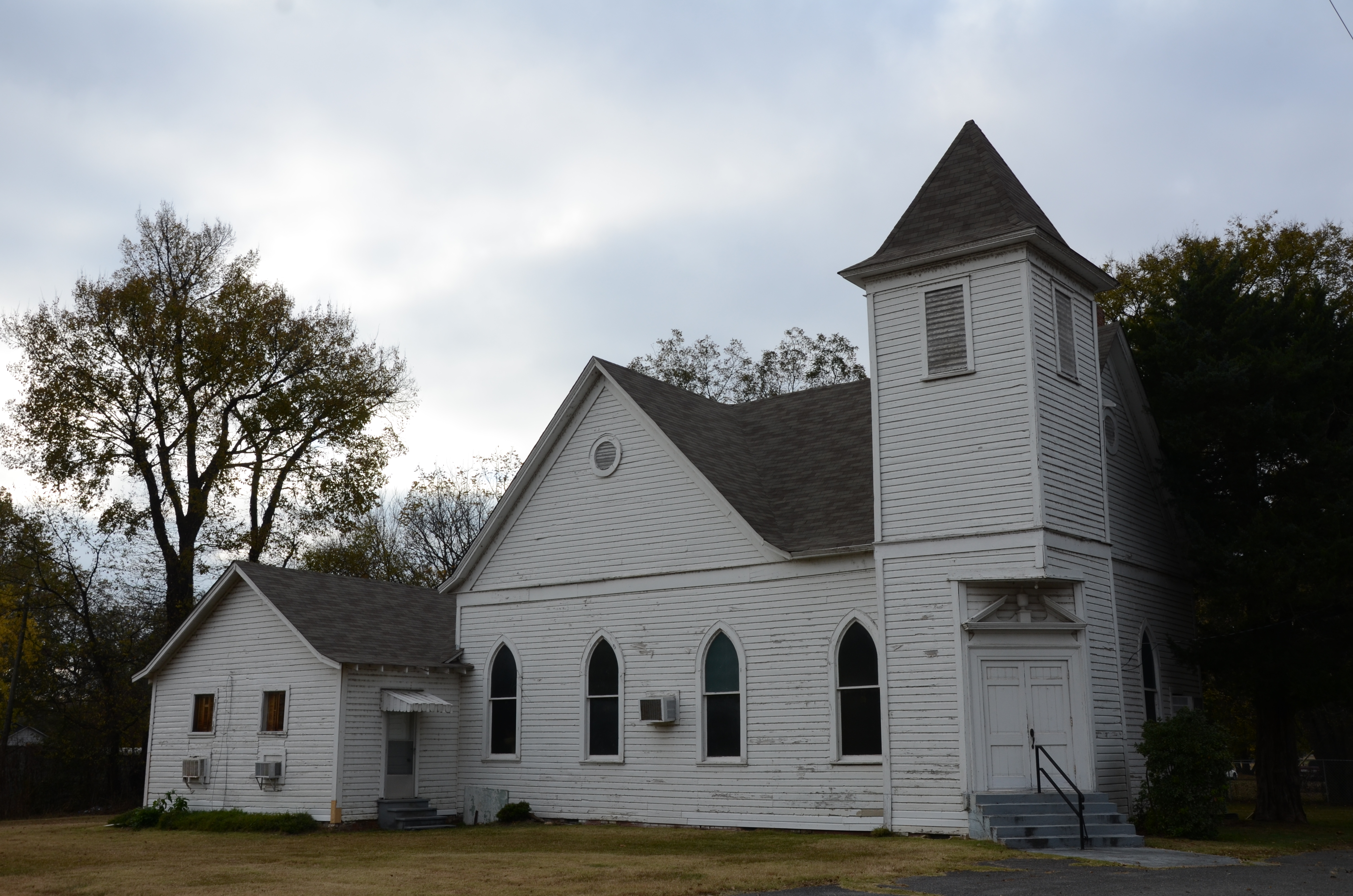

- Location within Arkansas Location within the United States
- Location: 301 Main St., Sherrill, Arkansas
- Coordinates: 34°23′15″N 91°57′8″W
- Built: 1909
- Architectural style: Late Gothic Revival
- NRHP reference No.: 02000487
- Added to NRHP: May 16, 2002

Sherrill United Methodist Church is a historic church at 301 Main Street in Sherrill, Arkansas. Its congregation is one of the oldest and continuously active churches in Jefferson County, Arkansas. Established in 1847, it was originally called Sherrill Methodist Episcopal Church South. In 2002, under that name, its building, a fine Gothic Revival structure built in 1910, listed on the National Register of Historic Places.

== Description and history ==
Sherrill United Methodist Church, at 118 West Main Street (on Highway 15 North 15 miles from Pine Bluff) in Sherrill, is a single story, wood-frame structure built 1909–1910 in a design reflecting the Craftsman and Gothic Revival styles of architecture.

"By 1909, the congregation had outgrown the home it had occupied since 1895," the National Register nomination committee says. "Under the leadership of the late Reverend Frank Rogers, ground was broken on the same site and construction of the present structure begun."

"By 1926 the membership had once more outgrown its accommodations. The parsonage was dismantled and the salvaged materials were used to build an addition at the rear of the building. This addition contained the fellowship hall and Sunday School rooms." - (article written and contributed by Reverend Bill Ferguson, Pastor Sherrill United Methodist it appeared in quoted the Pine Bluff Commercial June 2, 2002).

== See also ==
- National Register of Historic Places listings in Jefferson County, Arkansas
