= Louann, Arkansas =

- Town
- Location of Louann in Ouachita County, Arkansas.
- Coordinates: 33°23′29″N 92°47′32″W
- Country: United States
- State: Arkansas
- County: Ouachita

Area
  - Total: 0.24 sq mi (0.62 km^{2})
  - Land: 0.24 sq mi (0.62 km^{2})
  - Water: 0 sq mi (0.00 km^{2})
- Elevation: 138 ft (42 m)

Population (2020)
  - Total: 153
  - Estimate (2025): 149 ▼
  - Density: 642/sq mi (247.9/km^{2})
- Time zone: UTC-6 (Central (CST))
  - Summer (DST): UTC-5 (CDT)
- ZIP code: 71751
- Area code: 870
- FIPS code: 05-41630
- GNIS feature ID: 2406044

Louann is a town in Ouachita County, Arkansas, United States. As of the 2020 census, Louann had a population of 153. It is part of the Camden Micropolitan Statistical Area.

== Geography ==
According to the United States Census Bureau, the town has a total area of 0.6 km^{2} (0.23 sq mi), all land.

== Demographics ==
Historical population
Census	Pop.	Note	%±
1930	910		—
1940	492		−45.9%
1950	291		−40.9%
1960	261		−10.3%
1970	245		−6.1%
1980	282		15.1%
1990	158		−44.0%
2000	195		23.4%
2010	164		−15.9%
2020	153		−6.7%
2025 (est.)	149	▼	−2.6%
U.S. Decennial Census

As of the 2010 United States census, there were 164 people living in the town. The racial makeup of the town was 78.7% White, 16.5% Black, 0.6% from some other race and 3.0% from two or more races. 1.2% were Hispanic or Latino of any race.

As of the census of 2000, there were 195 people, 71 households, and 57 families living in the town. The population density was 313.7 people/km^{2} (812 people/mi^{2}). There were 88 housing units at an average density of 141.6 units/km^{2} (367 units/mi^{2}). The racial makeup of the town was 62.56% White, 36.41% Black or African American, 0.51% Native American, and 0.51% from two or more races.

There were 71 households, out of which 36.6% had children under the age of 18 living with them, 53.5% were married couples living together, 25.4% had a female householder with no husband present, and 19.7% were non-families. 19.7% of all households were made up of individuals, and 9.9% had someone living alone who was 65 years of age or older. The average household size was 2.75 and the average family size was 3.05.

In the town, the population was spread out, with 28.2% under the age of 18, 6.7% from 18 to 24, 27.2% from 25 to 44, 27.7% from 45 to 64, and 10.3% who were 65 years of age or older. The median age was 38 years. For every 100 females, there were 99.0 males. For every 100 females age 18 and over, there were 89.2 males.

The median income for a household in the town was $17,273, and the median income for a family was $18,333. Males had a median income of $21,250 versus $18,750 for females. The per capita income for the town was $11,288. About 44.4% of families and 45.0% of the population were below the poverty line, including 66.2% of those under the age of eighteen and 46.2% of those 65 or over.

== Education ==
Public education for elementary and secondary school students is available from Smackover-Norphlet School District (formerly Smackover School District), which operates Smackover High School.
