= Norphlet School District =

Defunct school district in Arkansas, United States

Norphlet School District 50 was a school district in Norphlet, Union County, Arkansas, United States. The district had more than 400 students in prekindergarten through grade 12 and employed more than 75 teachers and staff for its two schools (Norphlet Elementary School and Norphlet High School) and district offices.

The final superintendent was Albert Snow.

By 2014 the Norphlet school district had 388 students. Under Arkansas law a school district with fewer than 350 students for two or more consecutive years could be forced to merge, and the Norphlet district leadership decided to voluntarily consolidate with another school district instead of being forced to merge. Some members of the ABE expected Norphlet to choose consolidation with the El Dorado School District due to that district's El Dorado Promise university scholarship program and were surprised when Norphlet instead chose Smackover. On May 8, 2014, the Arkansas Board of Education (ABE) approved the merger of the Norphlet School District into the Smackover School District, effective July 1, 2014, forming the Smackover-Norphlet School District.

Snow became the superintendent of Fordyce School District.

== Schools ==
- Norphlet High School, serving grades 7 through 12.
- Norphlet Elementary School, serving prekindergarten through grade 6.
