= Smackover, Arkansas =

- City
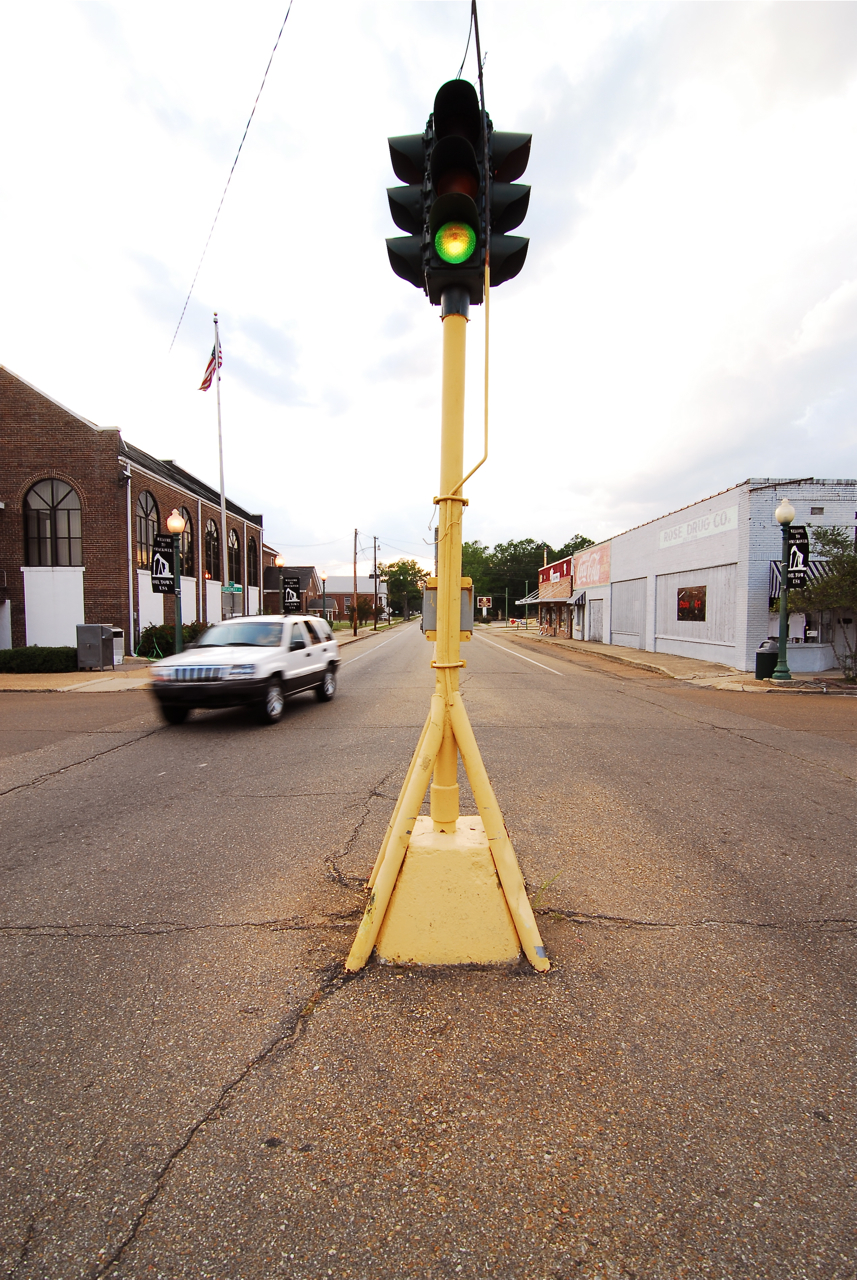
- Central Smackover

- Location of Smackover in Union County, Arkansas.
- Coordinates: 33°22′12″N 92°43′50″W
- Country: United States
- State: Arkansas
- County: Union

Area
  - Total: 4.35 sq mi (11.26 km^{2})
  - Land: 4.35 sq mi (11.26 km^{2})
  - Water: 0 sq mi (0.00 km^{2})
- Elevation: 121 ft (37 m)

Population (2020)
  - Total: 1,630
  - Estimate (2025): 1,584 ▼
  - Density: 374.8/sq mi (144.71/km^{2})
- Time zone: UTC-6 (Central (CST))
  - Summer (DST): UTC-5 (CDT)
- ZIP code: 71762
- Area code: 870
- FIPS code: 05-64730
- GNIS feature ID: 2405472
- Website: smackover.org

Smackover is a small city in northern Union County, Arkansas, United States. As of the 2020 census, Smackover had a population of 1,630. It had a large oil boom in the 1920s, with production continuing for some time.

== History ==
In 1686, the French settlers called this area "Sumac Couvert", which translates to "covered in sumac bushes". This was transliterated, that is, phonetically Anglicized by the English-speaking settlers of the 19th century and later to the name "Smackover."

The name Bayou de Chemin Couvert (Smackover Creek) first appeared in an April 5, 1789, letter written by the commandant of Fort Miro (Monroe, Louisiana) to the French territorial governor.

Oil was discovered in this area in 1922; it attracted national attention, speculators, and an economic boom. Smackover was incorporated in 1923. In the 1920s there was a large-scale oil industry in Smackover. The industry declined here and across southern Arkansas by the 1960s, at a cost of many jobs and major losses to the area economy.

== Smackover Oil Field ==
The Smackover Oil Field was discovered on April 14, 1922. The J.T. Murphy well drilled by Oil Operators Trust, reached the Upper Cretaceous Nacatoch sand at a depth of 2,024 feet (617 m), part of the Norphlet dome. Within a year, almost 1,000 wells had produced 25 million barrels of oil.

In October 1922, a lighter oil was produced further west, from the Meakin sand, at depths between 2,230 feet (680 m) and 2,350 feet (720 m). Oil was discovered in the Blossom sand at a depth of 2,610 feet (800 m) in March 1923. The Graves sand was exploited for oil at a depth of 2,501 feet (762 m) in January 1925.

On May 8, 1936, oil was discovered in the Jurassic Smackover Formation limestone at a depth of 4,800 feet (1,500 m) by the Phillips Petroleum Company. Oil and gas were produced from the porous Reynolds oolite at a depth of 4,897 feet (1,493 m).

== Geography ==
The city is in northern Union County along Smackover Creek, a tributary of the Ouachita River. El Dorado lies about ten miles to the south-southeast along Arkansas Route 7. According to the United States Census Bureau, the city has a total area of 4.2 square miles (11 km^{2}), all land.

=== Climate ===
The climate in this area is characterized by hot, humid summers and generally mild to cool winters. According to the Köppen Climate Classification system, Smackover has a humid subtropical climate, abbreviated "Cfa" on climate maps.

== Demographics ==
Historical population
Census	Pop.	Note	%±
1930	2,544		—
1940	2,235		−12.1%
1950	2,495		11.6%
1960	2,434		−2.4%
1970	2,058		−15.4%
1980	2,453		19.2%
1990	2,232		−9.0%
2000	2,005		−10.2%
2010	1,865		−7.0%
2020	1,630		−12.6%
2025 (est.)	1,584	▼	−2.8%
U.S. Decennial Census

=== 2020 census ===
As of the 2020 census, Smackover had a population of 1,630, and 463 families residing in the city.

The median age was 43.3 years. 21.5% of residents were under the age of 18 and 20.4% were 65 years of age or older. For every 100 females, there were 94.0 males, and for every 100 females age 18 and over, there were 90.8 males.

0.0% of residents lived in urban areas, while 100.0% lived in rural areas.

There were 704 households in Smackover, of which 30.0% had children under the age of 18 living in them. Of all households, 42.5% were married-couple households, 18.9% were households with a male householder and no spouse or partner present, and 32.4% were households with a female householder and no spouse or partner present. About 31.0% of all households were made up of individuals and 13.3% had someone living alone who was 65 years of age or older.

There were 818 housing units, of which 13.9% were vacant. The homeowner vacancy rate was 2.1% and the rental vacancy rate was 11.9%.

Smackover racial composition
Race	Num.	Perc.
White (non-Hispanic)	1,099	67.42%
Black or African American (non-Hispanic)	400	24.54%
Native American	5	0.31%
Asian	1	0.06%
Pacific Islander	1	0.06%
Other/Mixed	88	5.4%
Hispanic or Latino	36	2.21%

=== 2000 census ===
As of the census of 2000, there were 2,005 people, 794 households, and 565 families residing in the city. The population density was 471.9 inhabitants per square mile (182.2/km^{2}). There were 915 housing units at an average density of 215.3 per square mile (83.1/km^{2}). The racial makeup of the city was 72.57% White, 26.28% Black or African American, 0.10% Native American, 0.05% Asian, 0.05% Pacific Islander, and 0.95% from two or more races. 0.25% of the population were Hispanic or Latino of any race.

There were 794 households, out of which 31.1% had children under the age of 18 living with them, 52.9% were married couples living together, 15.1% had a female householder with no husband present, and 28.8% were non-families. 27.3% of all households were made up of individuals, and 17.8% had someone living alone who was 65 years of age or older. The average household size was 2.46 and the average family size was 2.99.

In the city, the population was spread out, with 24.7% under the age of 18, 7.8% from 18 to 24, 24.7% from 25 to 44, 21.7% from 45 to 64, and 21.1% who were 65 years of age or older. The median age was 39 years. For every 100 females, there were 92.2 males. For every 100 females age 18 and over, there were 81.3 males.

The median income for a household in the city was $28,807, and the median income for a family was $36,875. Males had a median income of $31,081 versus $19,536 for females. The per capita income for the city was $14,461. About 9.1% of families and 14.7% of the population were below the poverty line, including 18.8% of those under age 18 and 13.0% of those age 65 or over.

== Education ==
Public education for early childhood, elementary and secondary school students is primarily provided by the Smackover School District, which includes:

- Smackover Elementary School, serving prekindergarten through grade 6.
- Smackover High School, serving grades 7 through 12.

The school district's athletic emblem is the Battlin' Buckaroos with black and white as the school colors.

== Culture ==
A street-mounted antique stop light is located in the center of town and western-style store fronts line Main Street. It is home to the Arkansas Museum of Natural Resources. The Museum depicts the history and culture of Smackover and the surrounding area with an indoor reconstruction of the city's downtown, an Oil Field Park, and numerous exhibits illustrating South Arkansas's oil industry. Smackover hosts an annual four-day Oil Town Festival held in June.

Longtime college coaching legend Wayne Hardin, a former Smackover resident, was inducted into the NFF College Hall of Fame in 2013. The city has two natives in the College Football Hall of Fame.

== Notable people ==
- Nathan Fletcher (born 1976), California politician
- Wayne Hardin (1926–2017), college football player
- Sleepy LaBeef (1935–2019), Rockabilly/roots musician
- Clyde Scott (1924–2018), football player
- Jay Parrack (born 1971), former Tenor for Gold City
