= Union County, Arkansas =

County in Arkansas, United States

- County
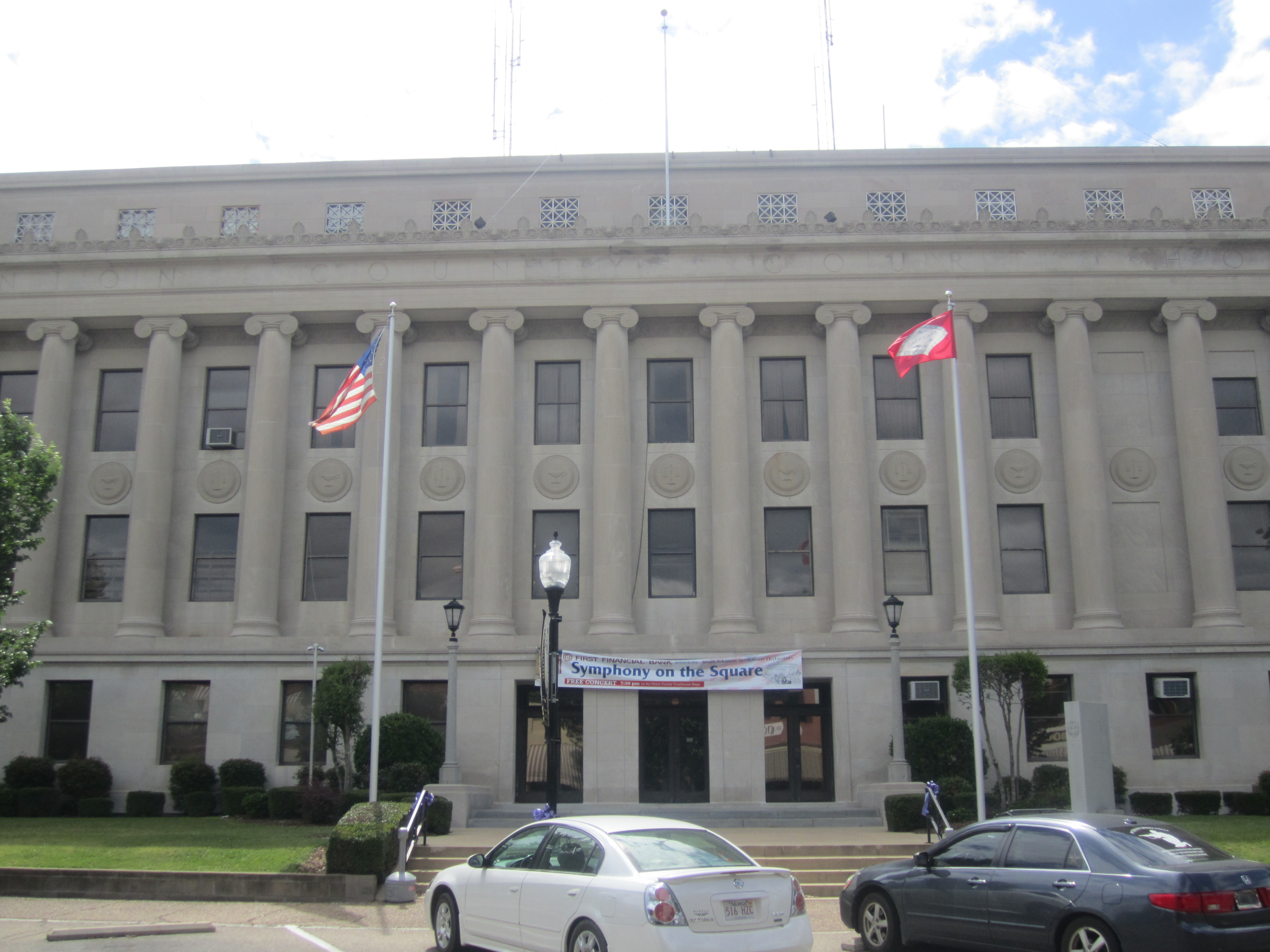
- Union County Courthouse in El Dorado

- Location within the U.S. state of Arkansas
- Coordinates: 33°11′14″N 92°35′29″W
- Country: United States
- State: Arkansas
- Founded: November 2, 1829
- Seat: El Dorado
- Largest city: El Dorado

Area
  - Total: 1,055 sq mi (2,730 km^{2})
  - Land: 1,039 sq mi (2,690 km^{2})
  - Water: 16 sq mi (41 km^{2}) 1.5%

Population (2020)
  - Total: 39,054
  - Estimate (2025): 36,926 ▼
  - Density: 37.59/sq mi (14.51/km^{2})
- Time zone: UTC−6 (Central)
  - Summer (DST): UTC−5 (CDT)
- Congressional district: 4th
- Website: www.unioncountyar.com

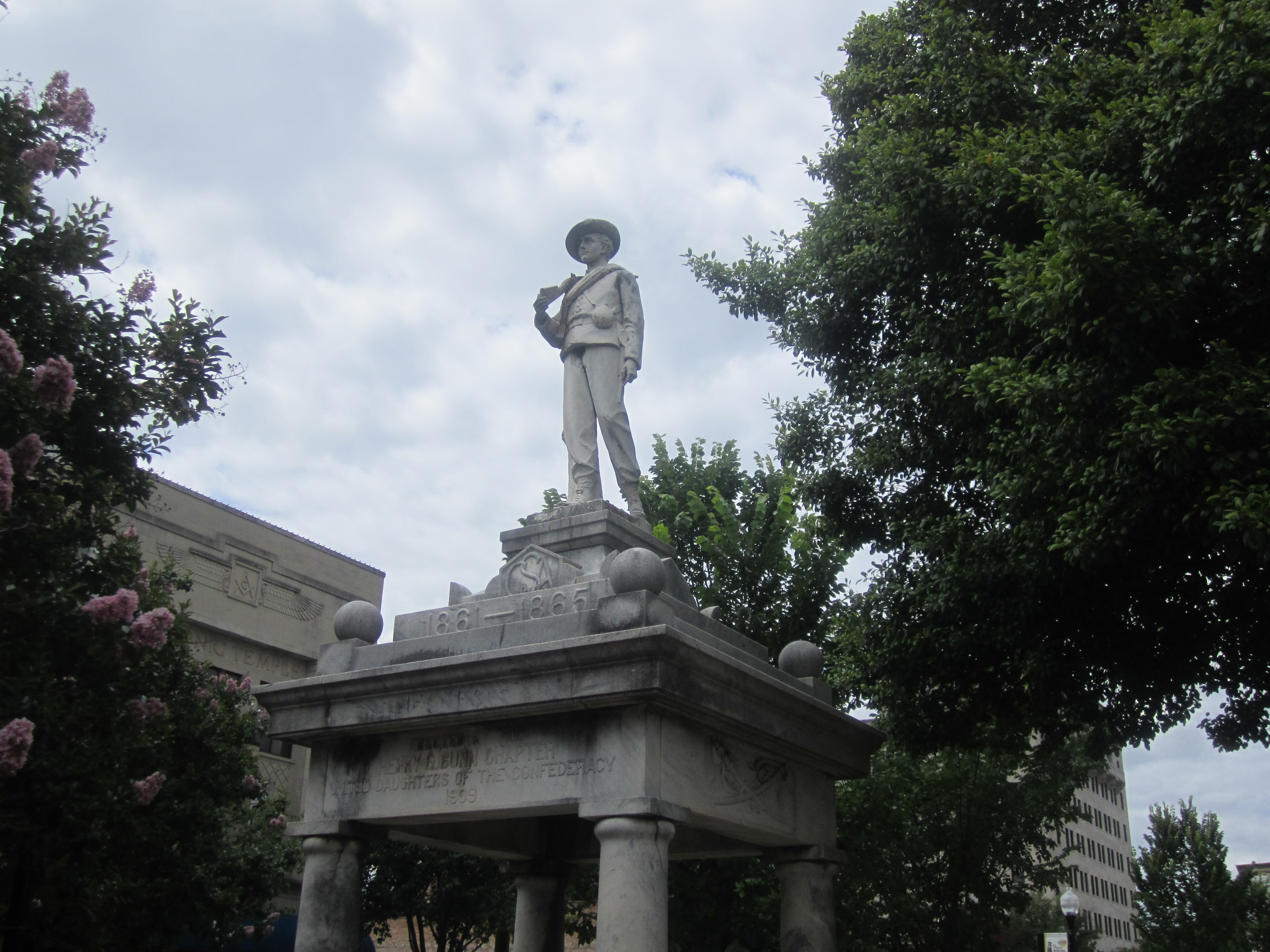
Confederate monument at Union County Courthouse

Union County is a county located on the central southern border of the U.S. state of Arkansas. It is the largest county in Arkansas by land area. As of the 2020 census, the population was 39,054. The county seat is El Dorado. The county was formed on November 2, 1829, and named in recognition of the citizens' petition for a new county, which said that they were petitioning "in the spirit of Union and Unity." The county is directly adjacent to the south to Union Parish in the state of Louisiana. The El Dorado, AR Micropolitan Statistical Area includes all of Union County.

Called by boosters the "Queen City of South Arkansas", El Dorado was at the heart of the 1920s oil boom in South Arkansas. More recently, the city has been called "Arkansas's Original Boomtown," as it emphasizes its historic assets for heritage tourism. The chemical and timber industries became important during and after World War II, and still have a place in the economy.

== History ==
Union County was formed on November 2, 1829, from portions of Clark and Hempstead counties. Areas along the waterways were originally developed for cotton plantations in the antebellum years, and planters depended on large groups of enslaved African-American workers to generate their profits.

On January 10, 1921, Dr. Samuel T. Busey hit oil with a well about a mile south of El Dorado, leading to an oil boom that attracted thousands of workers and speculators. His first well produced for fewer than two months, but by 1923, "El Dorado boasted fifty-nine oil contracting companies, thirteen oil distributors and refiners, and twenty-two oil production companies. The city was flooded with so many people that no bed space was available for them, leading to whole neighborhoods of tents and hastily constructed shacks to be erected throughout the city. The city's population reached a high of nearly 30,000 in 1925 during the boom before dropping to 16,241 by 1930 and rising to 25,000 by 1960." Oil production fell markedly in the early 1930s, in part due to companies' financial difficulties during the Great Depression. It recovered later in the decade.

During World War II, chemical plants were established in the county, but their production declined after the war. Exploitation of Arkansas forests led to growth in the timber industry in the county. Oil, chemical and timber industries are still important to the economy, although in lesser proportion.

== Geography ==
According to the U.S. Census Bureau, the county has a total area of 1,055 square miles (2,730 km^{2}), of which 1,039 square miles (2,690 km^{2}) is land and 16 square miles (41 km^{2}) (1.5%) is water. It is the largest county by area in Arkansas. Union County, along with Columbia County, has the largest bromine reserve in the United States. The lowest point in the state of Arkansas, also the lowest point in all landlocked U.S. states, is located on the Ouachita River in Union County and Ashley County, where it flows out of Arkansas and into Louisiana.

=== Adjacent counties ===
- Ouachita County (northwest)
- Calhoun County (north)
- Bradley County (northeast)
- Ashley County (east)
- Morehouse Parish, Louisiana (southeast)
- Union Parish, Louisiana (south)
- Claiborne Parish, Louisiana (southwest)
- Columbia County (west)

=== National protected area ===
- Felsenthal National Wildlife Refuge (part)

== Demographics ==
Historical population
Census	Pop.	Note	%±
1830	640		—
1840	2,889		351.4%
1850	10,298		256.5%
1860	12,288		19.3%
1870	10,571		−14.0%
1880	13,419		26.9%
1890	14,977		11.6%
1900	22,495		50.2%
1910	30,723		36.6%
1920	29,691		−3.4%
1930	55,800		87.9%
1940	50,461		−9.6%
1950	49,686		−1.5%
1960	49,518		−0.3%
1970	45,428		−8.3%
1980	48,573		6.9%
1990	46,719		−3.8%
2000	45,629		−2.3%
2010	41,639		−8.7%
2020	39,054		−6.2%
2025 (est.)	36,926	▼	−5.4%
U.S. Decennial Census; 1790–1960 1900–1990; 1990–2000 2010

=== 2020 census ===
As of the 2020 census, the county had a population of 39,054. The median age was 41.4 years. 23.2% of residents were under the age of 18 and 19.1% of residents were 65 years of age or older. For every 100 females there were 94.5 males, and for every 100 females age 18 and over there were 91.4 males age 18 and over.

The racial makeup of the county was 59.4% White, 32.6% Black or African American, 0.4% American Indian and Alaska Native, 0.7% Asian, <0.1% Native Hawaiian and Pacific Islander, 2.7% from some other race, and 4.1% from two or more races. Hispanic or Latino residents of any race comprised 4.5% of the population.

47.9% of residents lived in urban areas, while 52.1% lived in rural areas.

There were 16,182 households in the county, of which 30.3% had children under the age of 18 living in them. Of all households, 43.5% were married-couple households, 20.0% were households with a male householder and no spouse or partner present, and 31.6% were households with a female householder and no spouse or partner present. About 30.8% of all households were made up of individuals and 13.2% had someone living alone who was 65 years of age or older.

There were 18,599 housing units, of which 13.0% were vacant. Among occupied housing units, 70.4% were owner-occupied and 29.6% were renter-occupied. The homeowner vacancy rate was 1.5% and the rental vacancy rate was 13.5%.

=== 2000 census ===
As of the 2000 census, there were 45,629 people, 17,989 households, and 12,646 families residing in the county. The population density was 44 people per square mile (17 people/km^{2}). There were 20,676 housing units at an average density of 20 per square mile (7.7/km^{2}). The racial makeup of the county was 66.15% White, 31.97% Black or African American, 0.24% Native American, 0.40% Asian, 0.01% Pacific Islander, 0.46% from other races, and 0.77% from two or more races. 1.14% of the population were Hispanic or Latino of any race.

There were 17,989 households, out of which 32.20% had children under the age of 18 living with them, 51.30% were married couples living together, 15.20% had a female householder with no husband present, and 29.70% were non-families. 26.90% of all households were made up of individuals, and 12.10% had someone living alone who was 65 years of age or older. The average household size was 2.48 and the average family size was 3.00.

In the county, the population was spread out, with 25.90% under the age of 18, 8.30% from 18 to 24, 27.00% from 25 to 44, 22.70% from 45 to 64, and 16.10% who were 65 years of age or older. The median age was 38 years. For every 100 females there were 91.60 males. For every 100 females age 18 and over, there were 86.00 males.

The median income for a household in the county was $29,809, and the median income for a family was $36,805. Males had a median income of $31,868 versus $19,740 for females. The per capita income for the county was $16,063. About 14.70% of families and 18.70% of the population were below the poverty line, including 25.80% of those under age 18 and 14.30% of those age 65 or over.

== Government ==
=== Government ===
The county government is a constitutional body granted specific powers by the Constitution of Arkansas and the Arkansas Code. The quorum court is the legislative branch of the county government and controls all spending and revenue collection. Representatives are called justices of the peace and are elected from county districts every even-numbered year. The number of districts in a county vary from nine to fifteen, and district boundaries are drawn by the county election commission. The Union County Quorum Court has eleven members. Presiding over quorum court meetings is the county judge, who serves as the chief operating officer of the county. The county judge is elected at-large and does not vote in quorum court business, although capable of vetoing quorum court decisions.

Union County, Arkansas Elected countywide officials
Position	Officeholder	Party
County Judge	Mike Loftin	Republican
County Clerk	Mandi Fudge	Republican
Circuit Clerk	Cheryl Cochran-Wilson	Democratic
Sheriff	Ricky Roberts	Republican
Treasurer	Jody Cunningham	Republican
Collector	Karen Scott	Republican
Assessor	Michelle Barksdale	(Unknown)
Coroner	Stormey Primm	Republican

The composition of the Quorum Court following the 2024 elections is 8 Republicans, 2 Democrats, and 1 Independent. Justices of the Peace (members) of the Quorum Court following the elections are:

- District 1: Mike Dumas (D)
- District 2: Greg Harrison (R)
- District 3: David Taylor (R)
- District 4: Steven Ward (R)
- District 5: Carolyn Jones (D)
- District 6: Thad Mason (I)
- District 7: Casey Wooten (R)
- District 8: Royce DeWayne Worth (R)
- District 9: Benny Vestal (R)
- District 10: Ross Burton (R)
- District 11: Phillip Hamaker (R)

Additionally, the townships of Columbia County are entitled to elect their own respective constables, as set forth by the Constitution of Arkansas. Constables are largely of historical significance as they were used to keep the peace in rural areas when travel was more difficult. The township constables as of the 2024 elections are:

- Garner: Jordan Neal Braswell (R)
- Jackson: Robert H. Pepper (R)

=== Politics ===
Over the past few election cycles, Union County has trended heavily towards the Republican Party. As of 2024, the last Democrat to carry the county was Bill Clinton (a native Arkansan) in 1996.

United States presidential election results for Union County, Arkansas
Year	Republican		Democratic		Third party(ies)	
Year	No.	%	No.	%	No.	%
1896	148	7.56%	1,749	89.37%	60	3.07%
1900	336	21.05%	1,238	77.57%	22	1.38%
1904	297	23.57%	955	75.79%	8	0.63%
1908	535	27.23%	1,407	71.60%	23	1.17%
1912	152	10.25%	1,090	73.50%	241	16.25%
1916	273	13.90%	1,691	86.10%	0	0.00%
1920	493	21.29%	1,763	76.12%	60	2.59%
1924	450	16.84%	1,967	73.59%	256	9.58%
1928	1,612	33.95%	3,128	65.88%	8	0.17%
1932	245	4.27%	5,429	94.61%	64	1.12%
1936	254	5.76%	4,141	93.94%	13	0.29%
1940	489	9.15%	4,842	90.59%	14	0.26%
1944	833	15.26%	4,624	84.70%	2	0.04%
1948	1,039	12.46%	5,588	67.01%	1,712	20.53%
1952	5,266	41.11%	7,515	58.67%	29	0.23%
1956	5,059	39.75%	7,055	55.44%	612	4.81%
1960	5,631	41.51%	6,500	47.92%	1,434	10.57%
1964	8,472	54.38%	6,948	44.60%	160	1.03%
1968	4,919	28.60%	4,426	25.74%	7,853	45.66%
1972	11,925	76.72%	3,531	22.72%	87	0.56%
1976	7,918	48.93%	8,257	51.03%	7	0.04%
1980	9,401	55.10%	6,852	40.16%	810	4.75%
1984	12,333	65.74%	6,208	33.09%	218	1.16%
1988	10,581	61.32%	5,931	34.37%	744	4.31%
1992	7,305	39.32%	8,786	47.29%	2,489	13.40%
1996	6,053	37.97%	8,373	52.53%	1,514	9.50%
2000	8,647	55.40%	6,261	40.11%	701	4.49%
2004	10,502	58.89%	7,071	39.65%	259	1.45%
2008	10,677	62.15%	6,190	36.03%	312	1.82%
2012	10,699	62.29%	6,196	36.07%	282	1.64%
2016	10,456	61.89%	5,855	34.66%	583	3.45%
2020	10,478	63.09%	5,584	33.62%	545	3.28%
2024	10,196	66.00%	5,019	32.49%	233	1.51%

== Transportation ==
=== Major highways ===
- Future Interstate 69
- U.S. Highway 63
- U.S. Highway 82
- U.S. Highway 167
- Highway 7
- Highway 15
- Highway 57
- Highway 129
- Highway 160
- Highway 172
- Highway 275
- Highway 335

=== Airport ===
- South Arkansas Regional Airport at Goodwin Field

== Communities ==
=== Cities ===
- Calion
- El Dorado (county seat)
- Strong
- Huttig
- Junction City
- Norphlet
- Smackover

=== Town ===
- Felsenthal

=== Census-designated places ===
- Lawson
- Mount Holly
- Urbana

=== Other unincorporated communities ===
- Lapile
- Moro Bay
- Old Union
- New London
- Parkers Chapel

=== Townships ===
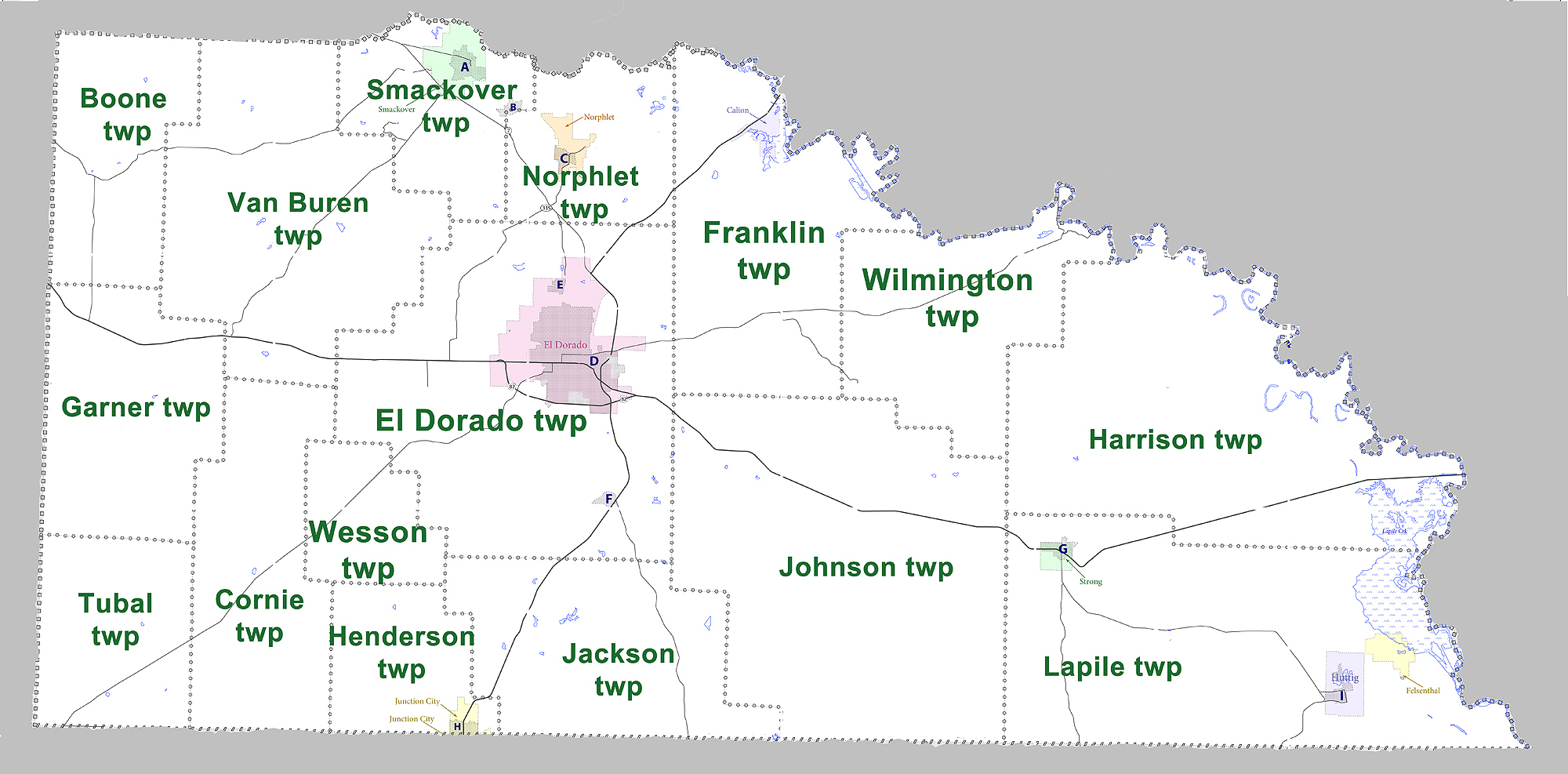
Townships in Union County as of 2010

Townships in Arkansas are the divisions of a county. Each township includes unincorporated areas; some may have incorporated cities or towns within part of their boundaries. Arkansas townships have limited purposes in modern times. However, the United States census does list Arkansas population based on townships (sometimes referred to as "county subdivisions" or "minor civil divisions"). Townships are also of value for historical purposes in terms of genealogical research. Each town or city is within one or more townships in an Arkansas county based on census maps and publications. The townships of Union County are listed below; listed in parentheses are the cities, towns, and/or census-designated places that are fully or partially inside the township.

- Boone
- Cornie
- El Dorado (El Dorado)
- Franklin (Calion)
- Garner
- Harrison
- Henderson (Junction City)
- Jackson
- Johnson
- Lapile (Felsenthal, Huttig, Strong)
- Norphlet (Norphlet)
- Smackover (Smackover)
- Tubal
- Van Buren
- Wesson
- Wilmington

== See also ==
- List of lakes in Union County, Arkansas
- National Register of Historic Places listings in Union County, Arkansas
