= Arkansas Highway 360 =

State highway in Arkansas, United States

Highway 360

Route information
- Maintained by ArDOT
- Length: 18.638 mi (29.995 km)
- Existed: November 23, 1966–present

Major junctions
- West end: AR 160 at Gin City
- East end: AR 53

Location
- Country: United States
- State: Arkansas
- County: Lafayette

Highway system
- Arkansas Highway System; Interstate; US; State; Business; Spurs; Suffixed; Scenic; Heritage
← AR 359	→ AR 361

Highway 360 (AR 360, Ark. 360, and Hwy. 360) is an east–west state highways in Lafayette County, Arkansas, United States. The route serves a rural area of South Arkansas. The segment was created in 1966, and extended in 1973. The highway is maintained by the Arkansas Department of Transportation (ArDOT).

== Route description ==
The highway begins at a junction with AR 160 at the unincorporated community of Gin City in rural Lafayette County, Arkansas. It runs north toward the Red River before curving east. After crossing the Union Pacific Railway, AR 360 has a junction and brief concurrency with AR 29 at Canfield. The route continues east just north of the Lafayette County Wildlife Management Area before crossing Lake Erling. AR 360 junctions with AR 53, where the designation terminates. The roadway continues east from the junction as Lafayette County Route 14 (CR 14).

The ArDOT maintains Highway 360 like all other parts of the state highway system. As a part of these responsibilities, the department tracks the volume of traffic using its roads in surveys using a metric called average annual daily traffic (AADT). ArDOT estimates the traffic level for a segment of roadway for any average day of the year in these surveys. As of 2022, estimates were below 400 vehicles per day (VPD) along the entire route, with the exception of the overlap at Canfield, estimated at 1,200 VPD. Highways under 400 VPD are classified as very low volume local road by the American Association of State Highway and Transportation Officials (AASHTO).

No segment of Highway 360 is part of the National Highway System (NHS), a network of roads important to the nation's economy, defense, and mobility.

== Major intersections ==
Mile markers reset at concurrencies. The entire route is in Lafayette County.

Location	mi	km	Destinations	Notes
Gin City	0.000	0.000	AR 160 – Bradley, Doddridge	Western terminus
Canfield	11.938– 0.000	19.212– 0.000	AR 29 – Lewisville, Bradley	
	6.700	10.783	AR 53 / CR 14 – Stamps, Walker Creek	Eastern terminus
1.000 mi = 1.609 km; 1.000 km = 0.621 mi: Concurrency terminus

== History ==
The Arkansas State Highway Commission created AR 360 on November 23, 1966, along an existing county road between Canfield and AR 53 in Lafayette County. On June 28, 1973, the Highway Commission extended the route west to Gin City following Act 9 of 1973 by the Arkansas General Assembly. The act directed county judges and legislators to designate up to 12 miles (19 km) of county roads as state highways in each county.
