= Arkansas Highway 160 =

State highway in Arkansas, United States

Highway 160

Route information
- Maintained by ArDOT

Section 1
- Length: 51.55 mi (82.96 km)
- West end: FM 249 at the Texas state line in Bloomburg, TX
- East end: AR 19 at Macedonia

Section 2
- Length: 14.73 mi (23.71 km)
- West end: AR 57 at Mount Holly
- East end: AR 7B in Smackover

Section 3
- Length: 38.99 mi (62.75 km)
- West end: US 278 in Harrell
- East end: US 425 in Fountain Hill

Section 4
- Length: 22.73 mi (36.58 km)
- West end: US 82 at Mater
- East end: US 65 / Great River Road at Chicot Junction

Location
- Country: United States
- State: Arkansas
- Counties: Miller, Lafayette, Columbia, Union, Calhoun, Bradley, Ashley, Chicot

Highway system
- Arkansas Highway System; Interstate; US; State; Business; Spurs; Suffixed; Scenic; Heritage
← AR 159	→ AR 161
← US 278	Hwy 278	→ AR 279

Highway 160 (AR 160, Ark. 160, and Hwy. 160) is a designation for four state highways in South Arkansas. The northernmost segment of 51.55 miles (82.96 km) runs from Farm to Market Road 249 at the Texas state line near Bloomburg, Texas east to Highway 19 at Macedonia. A second segment of 14.73 miles (23.71 km) runs east from Highway 57 east to Highway 7 Business in Smackover. In southern Calhoun County, Highway 160 begins at US Route 278 (US 278) and runs east to US 425 in Fountain Hill. A fourth segment begins at US 82 at Mater and runs 22.73 miles (36.58 km) east to US 65 at Chicot Junction.

== Route description ==
=== Texas to Macedonia ===
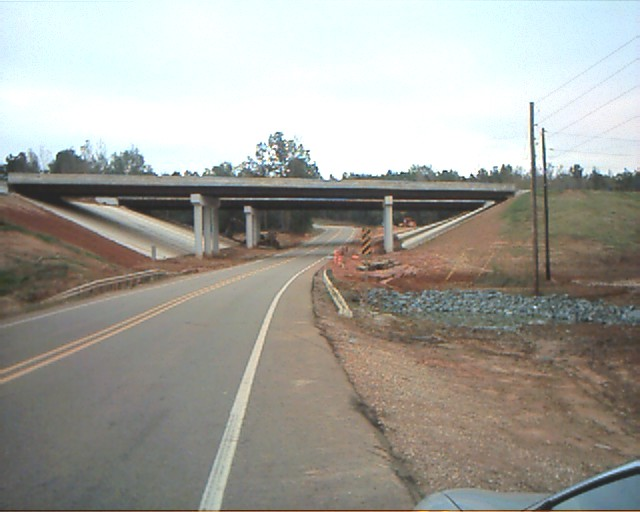
Highway 160 crosses under Interstate 49 near Doddridge

Highway 160 begins at State Line Avenue as Farm to Market Road 249 near Bloomburg, Texas and heads east to a junction with Highway 237 before a junction with US 71 near Doddridge. The route runs underneath Interstate 49 before it crosses the Red River to enter Lafayette County. The route continues east, passing Gin City where it meets Highway 360, Conway Cemetery on the National Register of Historic Places, and Highway 29 in Bradley. Highway 160 heads southeast around Lake Erling before forming a concurrency north with Highway 53 to Walker Creek.

The route enters Columbia County near Taylor where it forms a 0.13 miles (0.21 km) officially designated exception over US 371 before continuing northeast to Macedonia where it terminates at Highway 19.

=== Mount Holly to Smackover ===
Highway 160 begins at Highway 57 in Mount Holly in the northwest corner of Union County. The route runs northeast to a junction with Highway 7 outside Smackover before entering the city limits. Highway 160 terminates at Highway 7 Business (7th Street) near Smackover High School.

=== Harrell to Fountain Hill route ===
Arkansas Highway 160 travels south until meeting AR 172, after which it begins to arrow east to join with US 63/AR 15. The merge continues until Hermitage, when AR 160 continues south past Ingalls and Vick (crossing the Fordyce & Princeton Railroad). The route then angles north towards Highway 8 in Johnsville. Beyond Johnsville, AR 160 becomes concurrent with AR 133 until Fountain Hill, where it terminates.

== Major intersections ==
Mile markers reset at some concurrencies.

County	Location	mi	km	Destinations	Notes
Miller		0.00	0.00	FM 249 west	Continuation into Texas
Miller		2.04	3.28	AR 237 north – Texarkana	AR 237 southern terminus
Miller	Doddridge	8.98	14.45	US 71 – Texarkana, Shreveport, LA	
Miller–Lafayette county line	Red River	11.96– 12.37	19.25– 19.91	Crossing over the Red River	
Lafayette	Gin City	20.75	33.39	AR 360 east – Canfield	AR 360 western terminus
Lafayette	Bradley	25.48	41.01	AR 29 (Express Avenue) – Lewisville, Plain Dealing, LA	
Lafayette		35.20– 0.00	56.65– 0.00	AR 53 – Springhill, LA, Stamps	
Columbia	Taylor	3.41– 3.54	5.49– 5.70	US 371 (Long Avenue/Hays Avenue) – Springhill, LA, Magnolia	officially designated exception
Columbia	Macedonia	16.48	26.52	AR 19 – Magnolia, Shongaloo, LA	Eastern terminus
Gap in route
Union		0.00	0.00	AR 57	Western terminus
Union		13.41	21.58	AR 7 (Smackover Highway) – Camden, El Dorado	
Union	Smackover	14.73	23.71	AR 7B (Seventh Street)	Eastern terminus
Gap in route
Calhoun	Harrell	0.00	0.00	US 278 (Central) – Banks, Hampton	Western terminus
Calhoun		5.32	8.56	AR 172 west	AR 172 eastern terminus
Bradley		15.07	24.25	US 63 south – Moro Bay State Park	Begin US 63 overlap north
Bradley	Hermitage	0.00	0.00	US 63 north / US 63B north (Main Street) – Warren	End US 63 overlap, US 63B southern terminus
Bradley	Johnsville	17.52	28.20	AR 8 west – Fountain Hill, Warren	Begin AR 8 overlap
Ashley		0.00	0.00	AR 8 east – Crossett	End AR 8 overlap
Ashley		1.86	2.99	AR 133 north	AR 133 southern terminus
Ashley	Fountain Hill	6.41	10.32	US 425 – Monticello, Hamburg	Eastern terminus
Ashley	Gap in route				
Ashley	Mater	0.00	0.00	US 82 – Hamburg, Montrose	Western terminus
Ashley	Portland	7.10	11.43	AR 902 west (Main Street) – Wilson Lake Public Access	AR 902 eastern terminus
Ashley	Portland	7.35	11.83	US 165 – Dermott, Parkdale	
Chicot	Chicot Junction	22.73	36.58	US 65 / Great River Road – Lake Village, Eudora	Eastern terminus
1.000 mi = 1.609 km; 1.000 km = 0.621 mi: Concurrency terminus

== See also ==
- List of state highways in Arkansas
