= Lafayette County Training School =

- U.S. National Register of Historic Places
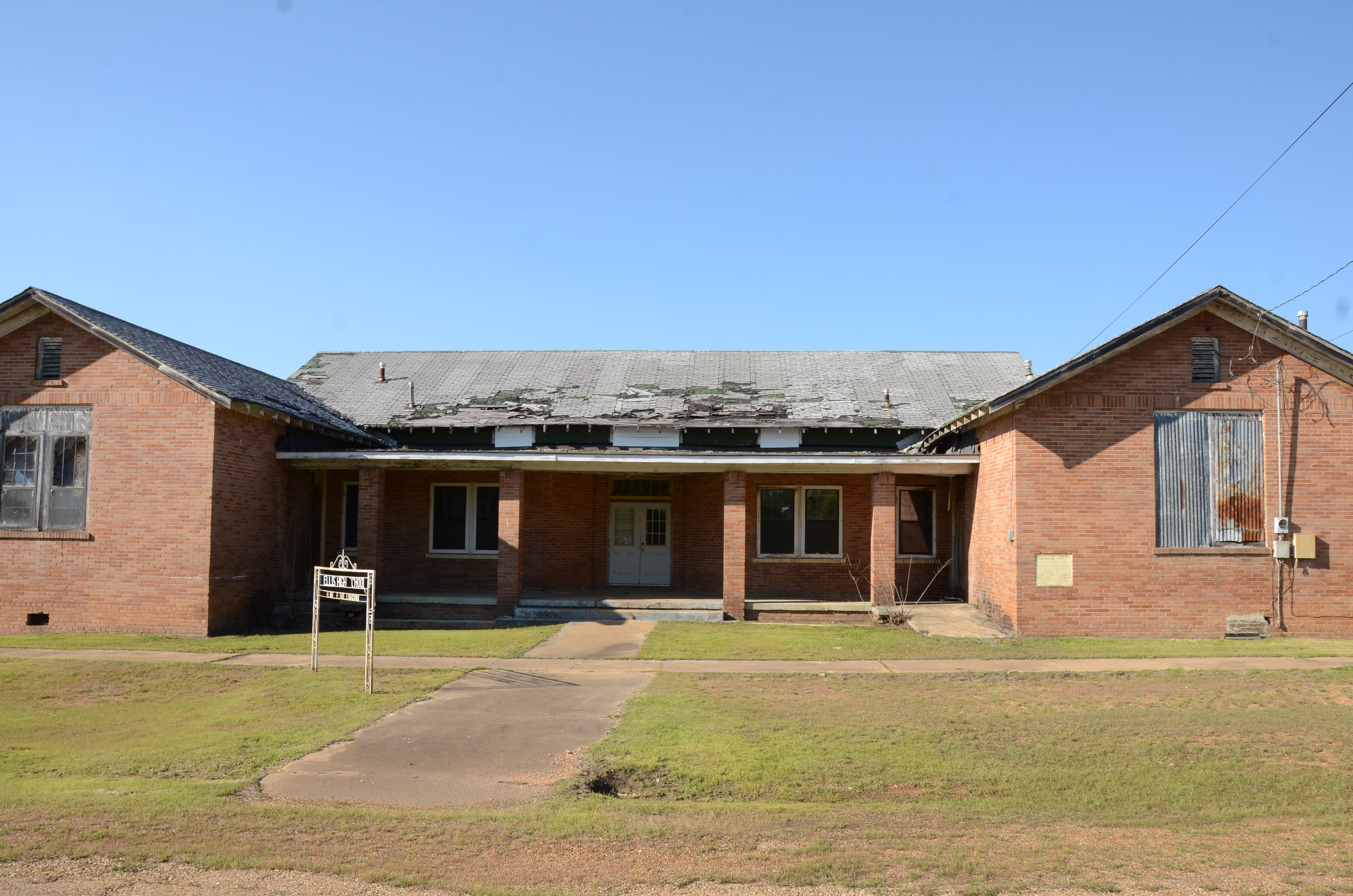

- Location within Arkansas Location within the United States
- Location: 1046 Berry St., Stamps, Arkansas
- Coordinates: 33°21′11″N 93°29′17″W
- Area: less than one acre
- Built: 1929
- Built by: S.F. Johnson
- Architect: Samuel L. Smith
- Architectural style: Bungalow/American craftsman
- NRHP reference No.: 04001500
- Added to NRHP: January 20, 2005

The Lafayette County Training School is a historic school building at 1046 Berry Street, on the former campus of Ellis High School in Stamps, Arkansas. It is a single-story brick building with a gable roof, built-in 1929 with assistance from the Rosenwald Fund. It is laid out in the shape of an H, and houses six classrooms in the side wings, with an office, library, and auditorium in the center. It is the only surviving Rosenwald School in Lafayette County. It served the area's African-American student population until 1969 when the county schools were integrated. It thereafter served as an integrated middle school until 1975, and for a time as a daycare center afterwards.

The building was listed on the National Register of Historic Places in 2005.

== Notable alumni ==
Maya Angelou, poet

== See also ==
- National Register of Historic Places listings in Lafayette County, Arkansas
