= Triplett Company Building =

- U.S. National Register of Historic Places
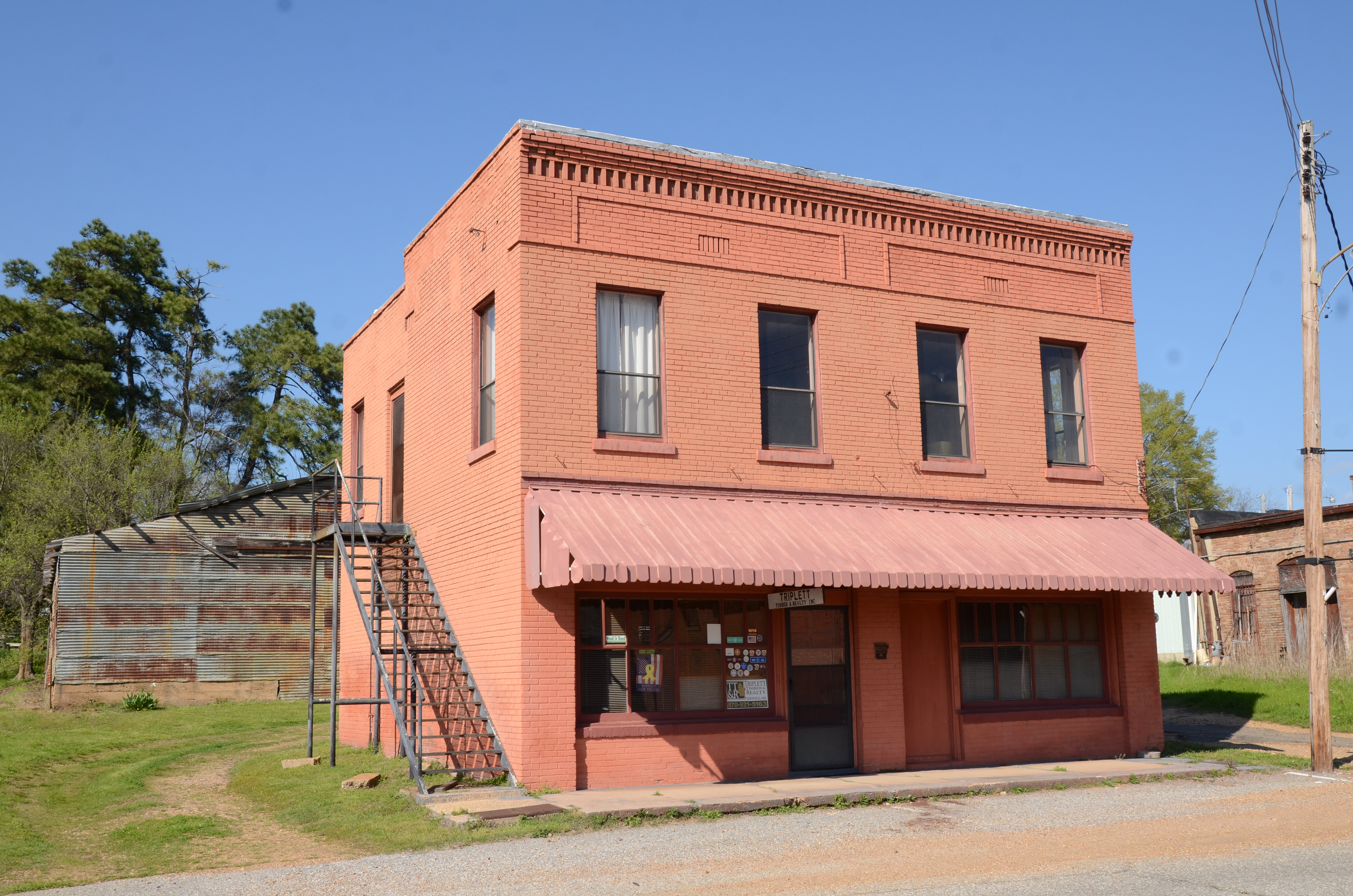

- Location within Arkansas Location within the United States
- Location: 2nd St., W of jct. with Spruce St., Lewisville, Arkansas
- Coordinates: 33°21′23″N 93°34′48″W
- Area: less than one acre
- Built: 1915
- MPS: Railroad Era Resources of Southwest Arkansas MPS
- NRHP reference No.: 96000638
- Added to NRHP: June 20, 1996

The Triplett Company Building is a historic commercial building on 2nd Street in Lewisville, Arkansas. The two-story brick structure was built c. 1915 by the Triplett Company, a lumber company that flourished during Lewisville's lumber boom. It is one of a small number of Lafayette County's commercial buildings to survive from that period, and is the best local example of panel brick design.

The building was listed on the National Register of Historic Places in 1996.

== See also ==
- National Register of Historic Places listings in Lafayette County, Arkansas
