= National Register of Historic Places listings in Lafayette County, Arkansas =

Location of Lafayette County in Arkansas

This is a list of the National Register of Historic Places listings in Lafayette County, Arkansas.

This is intended to be a complete list of the properties on the National Register of Historic Places in Lafayette County, Arkansas, United States. The locations of National Register properties for which the latitude and longitude coordinates are included below, may be seen in a map.

There are 10 properties listed on the National Register in the county.

Contents: Counties in Arkansas
- Arkansas
- Ashley
- Baxter
- Benton
- Boone
- Bradley
- Calhoun
- Carroll
- Chicot
- Clark
- Clay
- Cleburne
- Cleveland
- Columbia
- Conway
- Craighead
- Crawford
- Crittenden
- Cross
- Dallas
- Desha
- Drew
- Faulkner
- Franklin
- Fulton
- Garland
- Grant
- Greene
- Hempstead
- Hot Spring
- Howard
- Independence
- Izard
- Jackson
- Jefferson
- Johnson
- Lafayette
- Lawrence
- Lee
- Lincoln
- Little River
- Logan
- Lonoke
- Madison
- Marion
- Miller
- Mississippi
- Monroe
- Montgomery
- Nevada
- Newton
- Ouachita
- Perry
- Phillips
- Pike
- Poinsett
- Polk
- Pope
- Prairie
- Pulaski (Little Rock)
- Randolph
- St. Francis
- Saline
- Scott
- Searcy
- Sebastian
- Sevier
- Sharp
- Stone
- Union
- Van Buren
- Washington
- White
- Woodruff
- Yell

This National Park Service list is complete through NPS recent listings posted December 19, 2025.

== Current listings ==
	Name on the Register	Image	Date listed	Location	City or town	Description
1	P.D. Burton House	P.D. Burton House	June 3, 1998 (#98000612)	305 Chestnut; 33°21′29″N 93°34′44″W	Lewisville	
2	Conway Cemetery	Conway Cemetery	November 23, 1977 (#77000259)	West of Bradley; 33°06′07″N 93°40′59″W	Bradley	
3	First Methodist Church	First Methodist Church	June 20, 1996 (#96000639)	Northwestern corner of the junction of Chestnut and 4th Sts. 33°21′30″N 93°34′44″W	Lewisville	
4	First Presbyterian Church	First Presbyterian Church	June 20, 1996 (#96000640)	Southwestern corner of the junction of Market and Church Sts. 33°21′42″N 93°29′40″W	Stamps	
5	Gulf Oil Company Filling Station		January 24, 2019 (#100003331)	131 Main St. 33°21′48″N 93°30′03″W	Stamps	
6	King-Whatley Building	King-Whatley Building	March 30, 1978 (#78000603)	2nd and Maple Sts. 33°21′23″N 93°34′38″W	Lewisville	
7	Lafayette County Courthouse	Lafayette County Courthouse	February 25, 1993 (#93000085)	Bounded by 3rd, Spruce, 4th, and Maple Sts. 33°21′26″N 93°34′36″W	Lewisville	
8	Lafayette County Training School	Lafayette County Training School	January 20, 2005 (#04001500)	1046 Berry St. 33°21′11″N 93°29′17″W	Stamps	
9	Peoples Bank and Loan Building	Peoples Bank and Loan Building	June 20, 1996 (#96000637)	Southwestern corner of the junction of Spruce and 3rd Sts. 33°21′24″N 93°34′39″W	Lewisville	
10	Triplett Company Building	Triplett Company Building	June 20, 1996 (#96000638)	2nd St., west of its junction with Spruce St. 33°21′23″N 93°34′48″W	Lewisville	

== See also ==
- List of National Historic Landmarks in Arkansas
- National Register of Historic Places listings in Arkansas
