= First Presbyterian Church (Stamps, Arkansas) =

Historic church in Arkansas, United States

- U.S. National Register of Historic Places
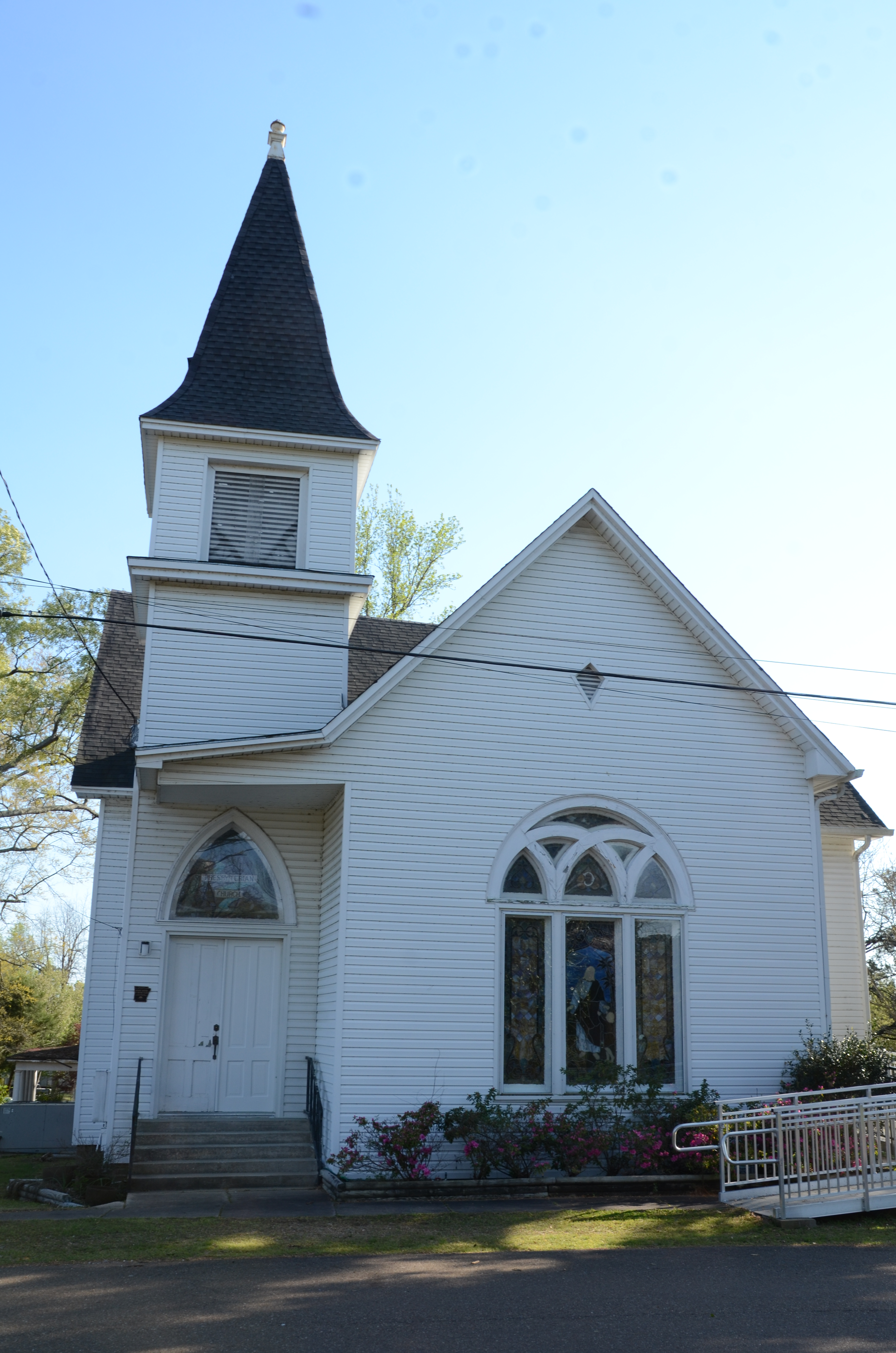

- Location within Arkansas Location within the United States
- Location: Jct. of Market and Church Sts., SW corner, Stamps, Arkansas
- Coordinates: 33°21′42″N 93°29′40″W
- Area: less than one acre
- Built: 1905
- Architectural style: Late Gothic Revival
- MPS: Railroad Era Resources of Southwest Arkansas MPS
- NRHP reference No.: 96000640
- Added to NRHP: June 20, 1996

The First Presbyterian Church is a historic church at the junction of Market and Church Streets, SW corner in Stamps, Arkansas. The wood-frame structure was built in 1905, during Lafayette County's timber boom brought about by the arrival of the railroad. It was built for one of the first congregations to form in Stamps, and is one of the few buildings in the city to survive from the period. It is a fine local example of Gothic Revival architecture.

The building was listed on the National Register of Historic Places in 1996.

== See also ==
- National Register of Historic Places listings in Lafayette County, Arkansas
