= Lafayette County Courthouse (Arkansas) =

- U.S. National Register of Historic Places
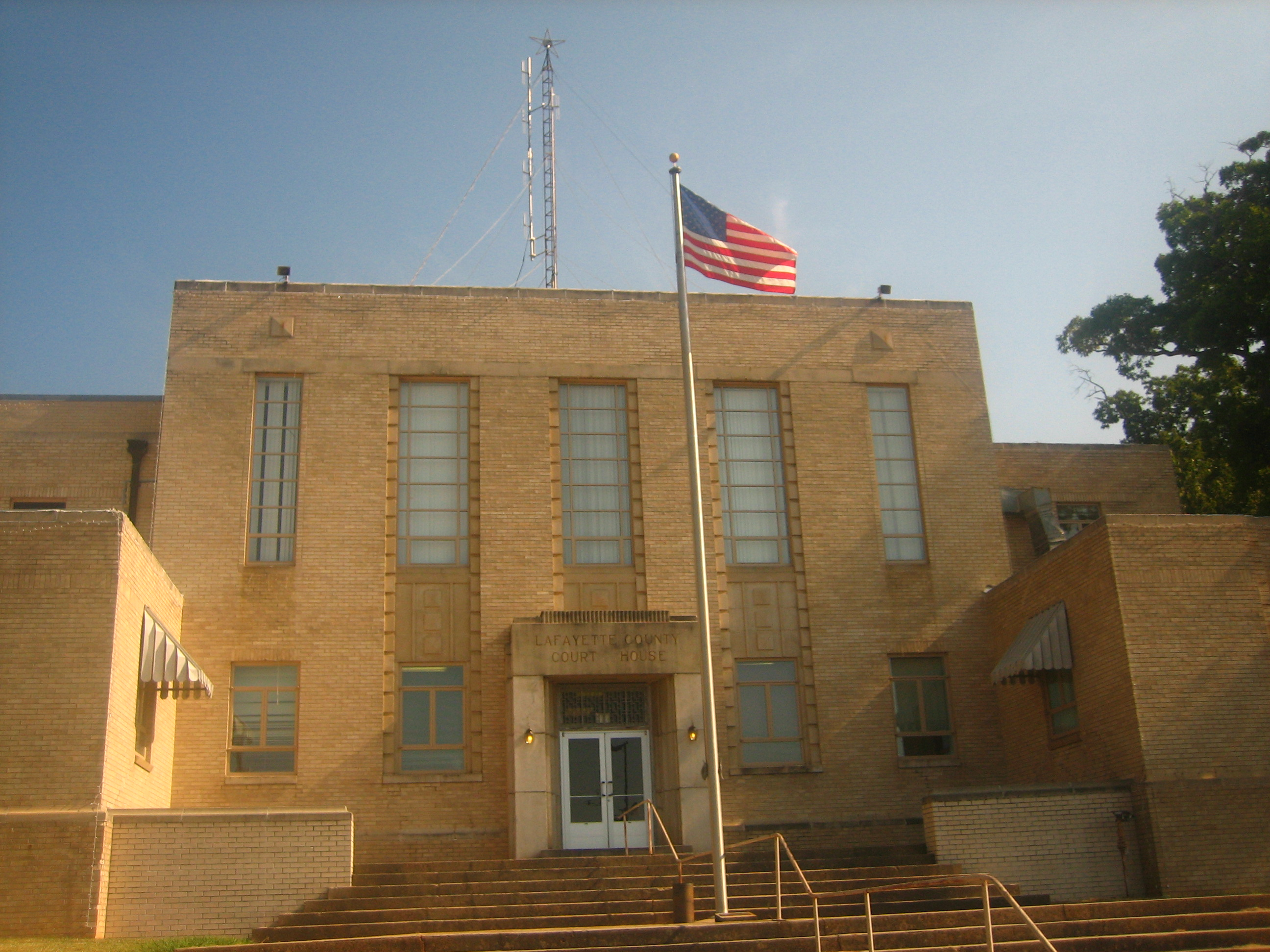

- Location within Arkansas Location within the United States
- Location: Bounded by Third, Spruce, Fourth and Maple Sts., Lewisville, Arkansas
- Coordinates: 33°21′26″N 93°34′36″W
- Area: 4 acres (1.6 ha)
- Built: 1942
- Architect: Clippard & Vaught
- Architectural style: Art Deco
- NRHP reference No.: 93000085
- Added to NRHP: February 25, 1993

The Lafayette County Courthouse occupies a city block in the heart of Lewisville, Arkansas, the seat of Lafayette County. It is a two-story brick building with Art Deco styling, built in 1940-42 as a Works Progress Administration project. Although it has a basically rectangular plan, it has a stepped visual appearance, with single- and two-story projections. Ornamentation of the buff brick surfaces is minimal. It is the county's finest Art Deco structure.

The building was listed on the National Register of Historic Places in 1993.

== See also ==
- National Register of Historic Places listings in Lafayette County, Arkansas
