= Arkansas Highway 313 =

State highway in Arkansas, United States

Highway 313

Route information
- Maintained by AHTD
- Length: 9.00 mi (14.48 km)
- Existed: 1965–present

Major junctions
- South end: AR 53 at Mars Hill
- North end: AR 29 at Lewisville

Location
- Country: United States
- State: Arkansas
- Counties: Lafayette

Highway system
- Arkansas Highway System; Interstate; US; State; Business; Spurs; Suffixed; Scenic; Heritage
← AR 312	→ AR 314

Arkansas Highway 313 is a north–south state highway in Lafayette County. The route runs 9.00 miles (14.48 km) from Arkansas Highway 53 north to Arkansas Highway 29 in Lewisville. The route does not intersect any other state highways.

== Route description ==
Arkansas Highway 313 begins at Arkansas Highway 53 at Mars Hill, an unincorporated community. The route runs north into Lewisville, the county seat of Lafayette County.

The road is a two–lane road for its entire length.

== History ==
The route was designated a state highway by the Arkansas State Highway Commission on June 23, 1965. The highway follows the original routing.

== Major intersections ==
The entire route is in Lafayette County.

Location	mi	km	Destinations	Notes
Mars Hill	0.0	0.0	AR 53 – McKamie, Stamps, Walker Creek	Southern terminus
Lewisville	9.00	14.48	AR 29 to US 82 – Canfield	Northern terminus
1.000 mi = 1.609 km; 1.000 km = 0.621 mi

== See also ==
- List of state highways in Arkansas
