= Garland, Arkansas =

- Town
- Location in Miller County, Arkansas
- Coordinates: 33°21′39″N 93°42′51″W
- Country: United States
- State: Arkansas
- County: Miller

Area
  - Total: 0.88 sq mi (2.27 km^{2})
  - Land: 0.88 sq mi (2.27 km^{2})
  - Water: 0 sq mi (0.00 km^{2})
- Elevation: 233 ft (71 m)

Population (2020)
  - Total: 195
  - Estimate (2025): 178 ▼
  - Density: 222.4/sq mi (85.86/km^{2})
- Time zone: UTC-6 (Central (CST))
  - Summer (DST): UTC-5 (CDT)
- ZIP Code: 71839
- FIPS code: 05-25780
- GNIS feature ID: 2406543

Garland, also known as Garland City, is a town in Miller County, Arkansas, United States. It is part of the Texarkana, Texas - Texarkana, Arkansas Metropolitan Statistical Area. The population was 195 at the 2020 census, down from 242 in 2010.

== Geography ==
Garland is located in eastern Miller County at 33°21′44″N 93°42′54″W (33.362268, -93.715081), on the west bank of the Red River. Via U.S. Route 82 it is 22 miles (35 km) east of Texarkana and 31 miles (50 km) west of Magnolia.

According to the United States Census Bureau, the town has a total area of 0.9 square miles (2.3 km^{2}), all land.

== Demographics ==
Historical population
| Census | Pop. | Note | %± |
|---|---|---|---|
| 1910 | 277 | | — |
| 1920 | 370 | | 33.6% |
| 1930 | 425 | | 14.9% |
| 1940 | 325 | | −23.5% |
| 1950 | 351 | | 8.0% |
| 1960 | 377 | | 7.4% |
| 1970 | 321 | | −14.9% |
| 1980 | 660 | | 105.6% |
| 1990 | 415 | | −37.1% |
| 2000 | 352 | | −15.2% |
| 2010 | 242 | | −31.2% |
| 2020 | 195 | | −19.4% |
| 2025 (est.) | 178 | ▼ | −8.7% |
U.S. Decennial Census

=== Racial and ethnic composition ===
Garland town, Arkansas – Racial and ethnic composition Note: the US Census treats Hispanic/Latino as an ethnic category. This table excludes Latinos from the racial categories and assigns them to a separate category. Hispanics/Latinos may be of any race.
| Race / Ethnicity (NH = Non-Hispanic) | Pop 2000 | Pop 2010 | Pop 2020 | % 2000 | % 2010 | % 2020 |
|---|---|---|---|---|---|---|
| White alone (NH) | 98 | 67 | 44 | 27.84% | 27.69% | 22.56% |
| Black or African American alone (NH) | 244 | 174 | 142 | 69.32% | 71.90% | 72.82% |
| Native American or Alaska Native alone (NH) | 1 | 0 | 0 | 0.28% | 0.00% | 0.00% |
| Asian alone (NH) | 1 | 1 | 0 | 0.28% | 0.41% | 0.00% |
| Native Hawaiian or Pacific Islander alone (NH) | 0 | 0 | 0 | 0.00% | 0.00% | 0.00% |
| Other race alone (NH) | 0 | 0 | 0 | 0.00% | 0.00% | 0.00% |
| Mixed race or Multiracial (NH) | 6 | 0 | 4 | 1.70% | 0.00% | 2.05% |
| Hispanic or Latino (any race) | 2 | 0 | 5 | 0.57% | 0.00% | 2.56% |
| Total | 352 | 242 | 195 | 100.00% | 100.00% | 100.00% |

=== 2020 census ===
As of the 2020 United States census, there were 195 people, 133 households, and 95 families residing in the town.

=== 2000 census ===
As of the census of 2000, there were 352 people, 133 households, and 88 families residing in the town. The population density was 165.7 people/km^{2} (429 people/mi^{2}). There were 164 housing units at an average density of 77.2 units/km^{2} (200 units/mi^{2}). The racial makeup of the town was 27.84% White, 69.89% Black or African American, 0.28% Native American, 0.28% Asian, and 1.70% from two or more races. 0.57% of the population were Hispanic or Latino of any race.

There were 133 households, out of which 25.6% had children under the age of 18 living with them, 35.3% were married couples living together, 23.3% had a female householder with no husband present, and 33.1% were non-families. 29.3% of all households were made up of individuals, and 13.5% had someone living alone who was 65 years of age or older. The average household size was 2.65 and the average family size was 3.24.

In the town, the population was spread out, with 25.6% under the age of 18, 9.1% from 18 to 24, 25.0% from 25 to 44, 26.4% from 45 to 64, and 13.9% who were 65 years of age or older. The median age was 38 years. For every 100 females, there were 92.3 males. For every 100 females age 18 and over, there were 87.1 males.

The median income for a household in the town was $17,500, and the median income for a family was $20,625. Males had a median income of $24,375 versus $15,000 for females. The per capita income for the town was $9,292. About 37.6% of families and 44.7% of the population were below the poverty line, including 62.5% of those under age 18 and 38.9% of those age 65 or over.

== Infrastructure ==
=== Highways ===
- U.S. Highway 82
- Arkansas Highway 134

Garland has a small airstrip on the south side of the town that is mostly used by crop dusters.

== Education ==
Lafayette County School District operates public schools. On July 1, 1990, the Garland Arkansas School District consolidated into the Lewisville School District. On July 1, 2003, the Lewisville district consolidated with the Stamps School District to form the Lafayette County district.

== Notable people ==
- Former Nevada Governor Kenny Guinn was born in Garland.
