= Lafayette County High School =

Lafayette County High School may refer to:

- Lafayette County High School (Arkansas)
- Lafayette County High School (Florida)
