= Arkansas Highway 278 =

Arkansas Highway 278 may refer to:

- Arkansas Highway 278 (1963-1998), now numbered 160, 169, and 189
- U.S. Route 278 in Arkansas, entered Arkansas in 1997
