= Lafayette County High School (Arkansas) =

Location
- 1500 North Hill Street; Stamps, Arkansas 72411; United States; 35°43′12″N 91°26′48″W

Information
- School type: Public comprehensive
- Status: Open
- School district: Lafayette County School District
- CEEB code: 042326
- NCES School ID: 050006500727
- Teaching staff: 48.97 (on FTE basis)
- Grades: 7–12
- Enrollment: 236 (2023-2024)
- Student to teacher ratio: 4.82
- Education system: ADE Smart Core
- Classes offered: Regular, Advanced Placement (AP)
- Colors: Navy blue and silver
- Athletics conference: 2A Region 7 (Football); 2A Region 7 East (Basketball)
- Mascot: Cougar
- Team name: Lafayette County Cougars
- Accreditation: ADE
- Affiliation: Arkansas Activities Association
- Website: www.lcscougars.org/o/lchs

Lafayette County High School is an accredited comprehensive public high school located in Stamps, Arkansas, United States. The school provides secondary education in grades 7 through 12 for approximately 220 square miles (570 km^{2}) of rural, distant communities of eastern Lafayette County, Arkansas, including Buckner, Falcon, Lewisville, Stamps and surrounding area. It is one of two public high schools in Lafayette County and the sole high school administered by the Lafayette County School District.

As of 2003, Lafayette County High School had over 900 students, and 45 instructors. Lafayette County has earned distinctions in Ingram's Magazine out of Kansas City for being the top 15 schools in the Texarkana area in average ACT composite scores.

== Academics ==
Lafayette High School is a Title I school that is accredited by the ADE and has been accredited by AdvancED since 1931.

=== Curriculum ===
The assumed course of study follows the Smart Core curriculum developed by the Arkansas Department of Education (ADE), which requires students complete at least 24 units prior to graduation. Students complete regular coursework and exams and may take Advanced Placement (AP) courses and exam with the opportunity to receive college credit.

Students have participated in Academic Competitions, NASA's Great Moonbuggy Race, Speech and Debate.

== Athletics ==
The Lafayette County High School mascot is the cougar with navy blue and silver serving as the school colors.

The Lafayette County Cougars compete in interscholastic activities within the 2A Classification, the state's 2nd smallest classification administered by the Arkansas Activities Association. The Cougars play within the 2A Region 7 Conference for football and the 2A Region 7 East Conference for basketball.

The Cougars fields junior varsity and varsity teams in golf (boys/girls), volleyball, basketball (boys/girls), tennis (boys/girls), track and field (boys/girls), baseball, and softball, along with cheer and dance.

== School shootings ==
On January 7, 1980, 16-year-old Evan Hampton, high school freshman student at Stamps High School, waited in a classroom for 19-year-old student Mike Sanders, whom he immediately killed. Hampton went to the principal's office, turned in the gun and waited for his arrest by police. He was convicted of first degree murder, sentenced to 20 years and was released after only serving four.

On December 15, 1997, 14-year old Joseph "Colt" Todd shot two students with a .22-caliber rifle as he hid in the woods outside of campus. He told law enforcement that he was tired of getting bullied, 17-year old Grover Henderson and 15-year old LaTisia Finley survived. and he was sentenced to five years in prison with 2 1/2 years suspended.
