= Lewisville School District =

Defunct school district in Arkansas, United States

Lewisville School District was a school district headquartered in Lewisville, Arkansas. It operated Lewisville Elementary School and Lewisville High School. The mascot was the Red Devil. It served sections of Lafayette and Miller counties, including Lewisville and Garland.

On July 1, 1990, the Garland School District consolidated into the Lewisville School District. On July 1, 2003, the Lewisville district consolidated with the Stamps School District to form the Lafayette County School District.
