= King–Whatley Building =

- U.S. National Register of Historic Places
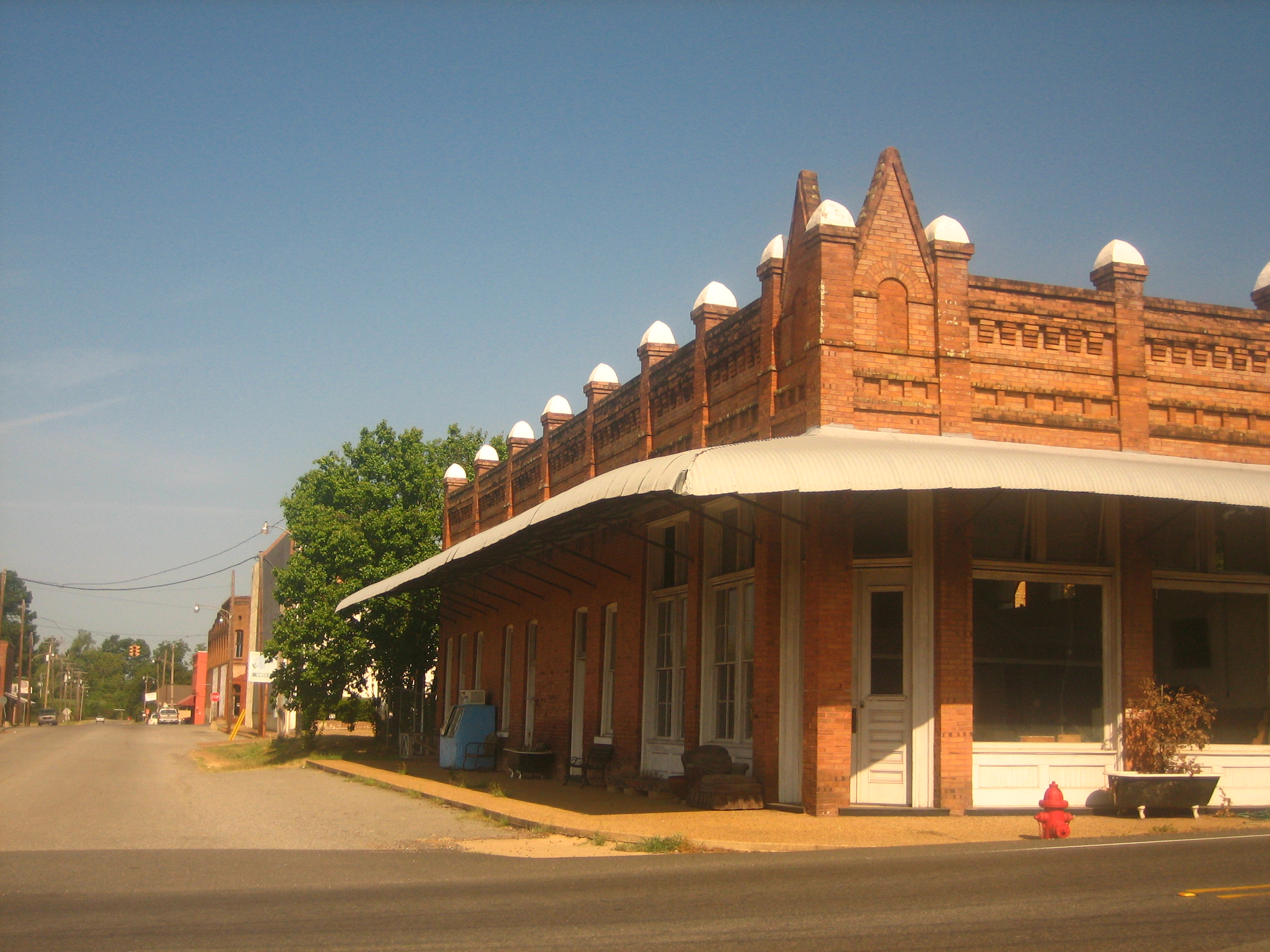

- Location within Arkansas Location within the United States
- Location: 2nd and Maple Sts., Lewisville, Arkansas
- Coordinates: 33°21′23″N 93°34′38″W
- Area: less than one acre
- Built: 1902
- NRHP reference No.: 78000603
- Added to NRHP: March 30, 1978

The King–Whatley Building is a historic commercial building at the northwest corner of Maple and 2nd Streets in Lewisville, Arkansas. The single-story brick building was built c. 1902 for the First National Bank of Lewisville, and later house legal offices and title companies that played an important role in the area's land development in the early decades of the 20th century. The building has a distinctive curved canopy, and a parapet rising above the flat roof which is studded with brick piers topped by rounded concrete caps.

The building was listed on the National Register of Historic Places in 1978.

== See also ==
- National Register of Historic Places listings in Lafayette County, Arkansas
