= 2004 United States presidential election in Arkansas =

- November 2, 2004

| Nominee | George W. Bush | John Kerry |
| Party | Republican | Democratic |
| Home state | Texas | Massachusetts |
| Running mate | Dick Cheney | John Edwards |
| Electoral vote | 6 | 0 |
| Popular vote | 572,898 | 469,953 |
| Percentage | 54.31% | 44.55% |

Bush
40–50%
50–60%
60–70%
Kerry
50–60%
60–70%
President before election
George W. Bush
Republican
Elected President
George W. Bush
Republican

The 2004 United States presidential election in Arkansas took place on November 2, 2004, and was part of the 2004 United States presidential election. State voters chose six representatives, or electors to the Electoral College, who voted for president and vice president.

Arkansas was won by incumbent President George W. Bush by a 9.8% margin of victory. Prior to the election, 11 out of 12 news organizations considered this a state Bush would win, or otherwise considered as a red state. Although there was little advertising and campaigning, polling did show a tight race as Bush won the state in 2000 with just over 50%. This was both the last election in which Arkansas was decided by a single-digit margin and in which the Democrat received more than 40% of the state's vote.

== Primaries ==
- 2004 Arkansas Democratic presidential primary
- 2004 Arkansas Republican presidential primary

== Campaign ==
=== Predictions ===
There were 12 news organizations who made state-by-state predictions of the election. Here are their last predictions before election day.

| Source | Ranking |
|---|---|
| D.C. Political Report | Lean R |
| Associated Press | Lean R |
| CNN | Likely R |
| Cook Political Report | Likely R |
| Newsweek | Lean R |
| New York Times | Lean R |
| Rasmussen Reports | Likely R |
| Research 2000 | Lean R |
| Washington Post | Likely R |
| Washington Times | Lean R |
| Zogby International | Toss-up |
| Washington Dispatch | Likely R |

=== Polling ===
Pre-election polling showed Bush leading throughout most of the general election. Bush frequently reached the 50% threshold, while Kerry never reached 47% in any poll taken prior to the election. The final 3 polls averaged Bush leading at 51% to Kerry at 45%.

=== Fundraising ===
Bush raised $1,387,692. Kerry raised $466,194.

=== Advertising and visits ===
Neither campaign advertised or visited the state during the fall campaign.

== Analysis ==
Early on, Kerry was seen to have a small but mostly insignificant chance at possibly flipping the state back to the Democratic Column. The Kerry Campaign saw Arkansas as a "Secondary Concern," focusing on the more important states such as Ohio and Wisconsin that were the key to winning the general election. During October however Bush began to widen the margin in many polls mostly due to Bush portraying Kerry as a "Northern Yankee big-city liberal" and a "Tax raiser" in the Presidential debates and after Osama bin Laden delivered a speech on the Arabic news network Al Jazeera days before the election quoted saying “Your security is in your own hands” Bush was essentially guaranteed to carry the state from then on.

On election day, Bush performed better than what polls showed, outperforming nearly every single poll. The only areas that went for Democratic opponent John Kerry were a handful of Delta counties; the state capital, Little Rock; Pine Bluff; and only a few counties to the south. Bush performed better in Arkansas than last election against Al Gore, the VP of Bill Clinton, the latter being the home son of Arkansas. In this election, Arkansas voted 7.3% to the right of the nation at large.

Although Arkansas is the home of former Democratic Governor and President Bill Clinton, who won his state's electoral vote in both 1992 and 1996, Democratic nominees Al Gore in 2000 and John Kerry in 2004 were both unsuccessful in carrying Arkansas, which went to Republican nominee George W. Bush in both elections. This election represented, arguably, the last time Arkansas was considered competitive on a national political level, as the GOP would gain supporters due to an increased distaste for the social liberalism espoused by the Democratic Party. Over the next 12 years, all three Democratic Congressmen in the House representing Arkansas at the time would retire, while both Democratic Senators at the time would be defeated in "wave" elections. The Republican trend culminated in the state rejecting its former first lady, Hillary Clinton, by almost 27 points in the 2016 election. As of 2026, no statewide or federally elected position in Arkansas is held by a Democrat.

As of the 2024 presidential election, Kerry remains the last Democratic candidate to win more than 40% of the vote. It is also the last election in which Jackson County, Monroe County, Clark County, Mississippi County, Lawrence County, Clay County, Poinsett County, Lincoln County, Bradley County, Randolph County, Hempstead County and Little River County voted for the Democratic candidate. This is also the last time in which the state was decided by a single-digit margin of victory.

== Results ==
2004 United States presidential election in Arkansas
| Party | Candidate | Running mate | Votes | Percentage | Electoral votes |
|---|---|---|---|---|---|
| Republican | George W. Bush (incumbent) | Dick Cheney (incumbent) | 572,898 | 54.31% | 6 |
| Democratic | John Kerry | John Edwards | 469,953 | 44.55% | 0 |
| Independent | Ralph Nader | Peter Camejo | 6,171 | 0.58% | 0 |
| Independent | Michael Badnarik | Richard Campagna | 2,345 | 0.22% | 0 |
| Independent | Michael Peroutka | Chuck Baldwin | 2,083 | 0.20% | 0 |
| Independent | David Cobb | Patricia LaMarche | 1,488 | 0.14% | 0 |
| Totals | | | 1,054,945 | 100.00% | 6 |
| Voter turnout (Voter age) | | | | | 50% |

=== By county ===
| County | George W. Bush Republican | | John Kerry Democratic | | Various candidates Other parties | | Margin | | Total |
| County | # | % | # | % | # | % | # | % | Total |
|---|---|---|---|---|---|---|---|---|---|
| Arkansas | 3,789 | 54.55% | 3,110 | 44.77% | 47 | 0.68% | 679 | 9.78% | 6,946 |
| Ashley | 4,567 | 53.65% | 3,881 | 45.59% | 64 | 0.76% | 686 | 8.06% | 8,512 |
| Baxter | 11,128 | 60.05% | 7,129 | 38.47% | 273 | 1.47% | 3,999 | 21.58% | 18,530 |
| Benton | 46,571 | 68.37% | 20,756 | 30.47% | 794 | 1.17% | 25,815 | 37.90% | 68,121 |
| Boone | 9,793 | 66.27% | 4,640 | 31.40% | 344 | 2.32% | 5,153 | 34.87% | 14,777 |
| Bradley | 2,011 | 47.33% | 2,206 | 51.92% | 32 | 0.75% | -195 | -4.59% | 4,249 |
| Calhoun | 1,340 | 58.29% | 939 | 40.84% | 20 | 0.86% | 401 | 17.45% | 2,299 |
| Carroll | 6,184 | 59.00% | 4,161 | 39.70% | 136 | 1.30% | 2,023 | 19.30% | 10,481 |
| Chicot | 1,725 | 36.26% | 2,993 | 62.92% | 39 | 0.82% | -1,268 | -26.66% | 4,757 |
| Clark | 4,144 | 44.99% | 4,990 | 54.17% | 77 | 0.84% | -846 | -9.18% | 9,211 |
| Clay | 2,759 | 45.26% | 3,264 | 53.54% | 73 | 1.20% | -505 | -8.28% | 6,096 |
| Cleburne | 7,107 | 60.43% | 4,517 | 38.41% | 137 | 1.16% | 2,590 | 22.02% | 11,761 |
| Cleveland | 2,009 | 57.47% | 1,450 | 41.48% | 37 | 1.06% | 559 | 15.99% | 3,496 |
| Columbia | 5,729 | 57.82% | 4,108 | 41.46% | 72 | 0.72% | 1,621 | 16.36% | 9,909 |
| Conway | 4,009 | 49.59% | 3,982 | 49.26% | 93 | 1.15% | 27 | 0.33% | 8,084 |
| Craighead | 15,818 | 53.08% | 13,665 | 45.85% | 318 | 1.07% | 2,153 | 7.23% | 29,801 |
| Crawford | 13,391 | 65.64% | 6,764 | 33.16% | 246 | 1.20% | 6,627 | 32.48% | 20,401 |
| Crittenden | 6,930 | 45.29% | 8,277 | 54.10% | 93 | 0.61% | -1,347 | -8.81% | 15,300 |
| Cross | 3,864 | 54.62% | 3,135 | 44.32% | 75 | 1.06% | 729 | 10.30% | 7,074 |
| Dallas | 1,700 | 50.18% | 1,671 | 49.32% | 17 | 0.50% | 29 | 0.86% | 3,388 |
| Desha | 1,729 | 37.21% | 2,851 | 61.35% | 67 | 1.45% | -1,122 | -24.14% | 4,647 |
| Drew | 3,262 | 52.20% | 2,952 | 47.24% | 35 | 0.56% | 310 | 4.96% | 6,249 |
| Faulkner | 21,514 | 58.64% | 14,538 | 39.63% | 634 | 1.73% | 6,976 | 19.01% | 36,686 |
| Franklin | 4,181 | 57.36% | 3,008 | 41.27% | 100 | 1.37% | 1,173 | 16.09% | 7,289 |
| Fulton | 2,522 | 50.90% | 2,370 | 47.83% | 63 | 1.27% | 152 | 3.07% | 4,955 |
| Garland | 21,734 | 54.13% | 18,040 | 44.93% | 380 | 0.95% | 3,694 | 9.20% | 40,154 |
| Grant | 4,205 | 62.11% | 2,524 | 37.28% | 41 | 0.61% | 1,681 | 24.83% | 6,770 |
| Greene | 7,237 | 51.86% | 6,564 | 47.04% | 154 | 1.10% | 673 | 4.82% | 13,955 |
| Hempstead | 3,580 | 48.04% | 3,817 | 51.22% | 55 | 0.74% | -237 | -3.18% | 7,452 |
| Hot Spring | 5,960 | 49.40% | 5,901 | 48.91% | 204 | 1.69% | 59 | 0.49% | 12,065 |
| Howard | 2,736 | 55.35% | 2,166 | 43.82% | 41 | 0.83% | 570 | 11.53% | 4,943 |
| Independence | 7,430 | 57.11% | 5,443 | 41.83% | 138 | 1.06% | 1,987 | 15.28% | 13,011 |
| Izard | 2,833 | 51.57% | 2,586 | 47.08% | 74 | 1.35% | 247 | 4.49% | 5,493 |
| Jackson | 2,624 | 42.19% | 3,515 | 56.52% | 80 | 1.29% | -891 | -14.33% | 6,219 |
| Jefferson | 10,218 | 33.51% | 19,675 | 64.52% | 600 | 1.97% | -9,457 | -31.01% | 30,493 |
| Johnson | 4,311 | 53.59% | 3,622 | 45.03% | 111 | 1.38% | 689 | 8.56% | 8,044 |
| Lafayette | 1,604 | 50.27% | 1,567 | 48.11% | 20 | 0.63% | 37 | 1.16% | 3,191 |
| Lawrence | 2,951 | 44.61% | 3,544 | 53.58% | 120 | 1.81% | -593 | -8.97% | 6,615 |
| Lee | 1,492 | 36.57% | 2,548 | 62.45% | 40 | 0.98% | -1,056 | -25.88% | 4,080 |
| Lincoln | 1,921 | 46.75% | 2,149 | 52.30% | 39 | 0.95% | -228 | -5.55% | 4,109 |
| Little River | 2,575 | 48.64% | 2,677 | 50.57% | 42 | 0.80% | -102 | -1.93% | 5,294 |
| Logan | 5,076 | 59.36% | 3,361 | 39.31% | 114 | 1.33% | 1,715 | 20.05% | 8,551 |
| Lonoke | 14,398 | 65.36% | 7,454 | 33.84% | 178 | 0.80% | 6,944 | 31.52% | 22,030 |
| Madison | 3,873 | 60.67% | 2,421 | 37.92% | 90 | 1.41% | 1,452 | 22.75% | 6,384 |
| Marion | 4,127 | 60.10% | 2,602 | 37.89% | 138 | 2.01% | 1,525 | 22.21% | 6,867 |
| Miller | 8,448 | 57.56% | 6,139 | 41.82% | 91 | 0.62% | 2,309 | 15.74% | 14,678 |
| Mississippi | 6,121 | 43.25% | 7,593 | 53.65% | 439 | 3.11% | -1,472 | -10.40% | 14,153 |
| Monroe | 1,586 | 43.25% | 2,049 | 55.88% | 32 | 0.87% | -463 | -12.63% | 3,667 |
| Montgomery | 2,367 | 59.80% | 1,524 | 38.50% | 67 | 1.69% | 843 | 21.30% | 3,958 |
| Nevada | 1,752 | 50.39% | 1,694 | 48.72% | 31 | 0.89% | 58 | 1.67% | 3,477 |
| Newton | 2,779 | 63.48% | 1,506 | 34.40% | 93 | 2.11% | 1,273 | 29.08% | 4,378 |
| Ouachita | 5,345 | 50.19% | 5,188 | 48.71% | 117 | 1.09% | 157 | 1.48% | 10,650 |
| Perry | 2,435 | 54.95% | 1,921 | 43.35% | 75 | 1.69% | 514 | 11.60% | 4,431 |
| Phillips | 3,161 | 35.65% | 5,642 | 63.62% | 65 | 0.73% | -2,481 | -27.97% | 8,868 |
| Pike | 2,013 | 59.79% | 1,310 | 38.91% | 44 | 1.30% | 703 | 20.88% | 3,367 |
| Poinsett | 3,555 | 46.03% | 4,069 | 52.69% | 99 | 1.28% | -514 | -6.66% | 7,723 |
| Polk | 5,192 | 66.57% | 2,473 | 31.71% | 134 | 1.72% | 2,719 | 34.86% | 7,799 |
| Pope | 13,614 | 65.13% | 7,100 | 33.97% | 188 | 0.90% | 6,514 | 31.16% | 20,902 |
| Prairie | 2,030 | 56.02% | 1,562 | 43.10% | 32 | 0.88% | 468 | 12.92% | 3,624 |
| Pulaski | 67,903 | 44.20% | 84,532 | 55.03% | 1,185 | 0.77% | -16,629 | -10.83% | 153,620 |
| Randolph | 3,158 | 47.37% | 3,412 | 51.18% | 97 | 1.44% | -254 | -3.81% | 6,667 |
| St. Francis | 3,815 | 39.79% | 5,684 | 59.28% | 89 | 0.93% | -1,869 | -19.49% | 9,588 |
| Saline | 24,864 | 63.15% | 14,153 | 35.94% | 359 | 0.92% | 10,711 | 27.21% | 39,376 |
| Scott | 2,514 | 62.26% | 1,473 | 36.48% | 51 | 1.26% | 1,041 | 25.78% | 4,038 |
| Searcy | 2,565 | 64.25% | 1,370 | 34.32% | 57 | 1.44% | 1,195 | 29.93% | 3,992 |
| Sebastian | 27,303 | 61.76% | 16,479 | 37.27% | 429 | 0.97% | 10,824 | 24.49% | 44,211 |
| Sevier | 2,516 | 54.68% | 2,035 | 44.23% | 50 | 1.08% | 481 | 10.45% | 4,601 |
| Sharp | 4,097 | 54.85% | 3,265 | 43.71% | 108 | 1.45% | 832 | 11.14% | 7,470 |
| Stone | 3,188 | 57.45% | 2,255 | 40.64% | 106 | 1.91% | 933 | 16.81% | 5,549 |
| Union | 10,502 | 58.89% | 7,071 | 39.65% | 259 | 1.46% | 3,431 | 19.24% | 17,832 |
| Van Buren | 3,988 | 54.08% | 3,310 | 44.89% | 76 | 1.03% | 678 | 9.19% | 7,374 |
| Washington | 35,726 | 55.73% | 27,597 | 43.05% | 780 | 1.22% | 8,129 | 12.68% | 64,103 |
| White | 17,001 | 64.34% | 9,129 | 34.55% | 295 | 1.12% | 7,872 | 29.79% | 26,425 |
| Woodruff | 1,021 | 33.74% | 1,972 | 65.17% | 33 | 1.09% | -951 | -31.43% | 3,026 |
| Yell | 3,678 | 55.23% | 2,913 | 43.75% | 68 | 1.03% | 765 | 11.48% | 6,659 |
| Totals | 572,898 | 54.31% | 469,953 | 44.55% | 12,094 | 1.14% | 102,945 | 9.76% | 1,054,945 |

==== Counties that flipped from Democratic to Republican ====
- Ashley (Largest city: Crossett)
- Craighead (Largest city: Jonesboro)
- Cross (Largest city: Wynne)
- Dallas (Largest city: Fordyce)
- Drew (Largest city: Monticello)
- Greene (Largest city: Paragould)
- Hot Spring (Largest city: Malvern)
- Izard (Largest city: Horseshoe Bend)
- Lafayette (Largest city: Stamps)
- Nevada (Largest city: Prescott)
- Ouachita (Largest city: Camden)

=== By congressional district ===
Bush won all four congressional districts, including three held by Democrats.

| District | Bush | Kerry | Representative |
|---|---|---|---|
| 1st | 52% | 47% | Marion Berry |
| 2nd | 51% | 48% | Vic Snyder |
| 3rd | 62% | 36% | John Boozman |
| 4th | 51% | 48% | Mike Ross |

== Electors ==
Technically the voters of Arkansas cast their ballots for electors: representatives to the Electoral College. Arkansas is allocated 6 electors because it has 4 congressional districts and 2 senators. All candidates who appear on the ballot or qualify to receive write-in votes must submit a list of 6 electors, who pledge to vote for their candidate and his or her running mate. Whoever wins the majority of votes in the state is awarded all 6 electoral votes. Their chosen electors then vote for president and vice president. Although electors are pledged to their candidate and running mate, they are not obligated to vote for them. An elector who votes for someone other than his or her candidate is known as a faithless elector.

The electors of each state and the District of Columbia met on December 13, 2004, to cast their votes for president and vice president. The Electoral College itself never meets as one body. Instead the electors from each state and the District of Columbia met in their respective capitols.

The following were the members of the Electoral College from Arkansas. All were pledged to and voted for George W. Bush and Dick Cheney:

1. Bobbi Dodge
2. Gay White
3. Ida Fineburg
4. John Felts
5. Jim Davis
6. Martha McCaskill

== See also ==
- United States presidential elections in Arkansas
- Presidency of George W. Bush
