= P.D. Burton House =

Historic house in Arkansas, United States

- U.S. National Register of Historic Places
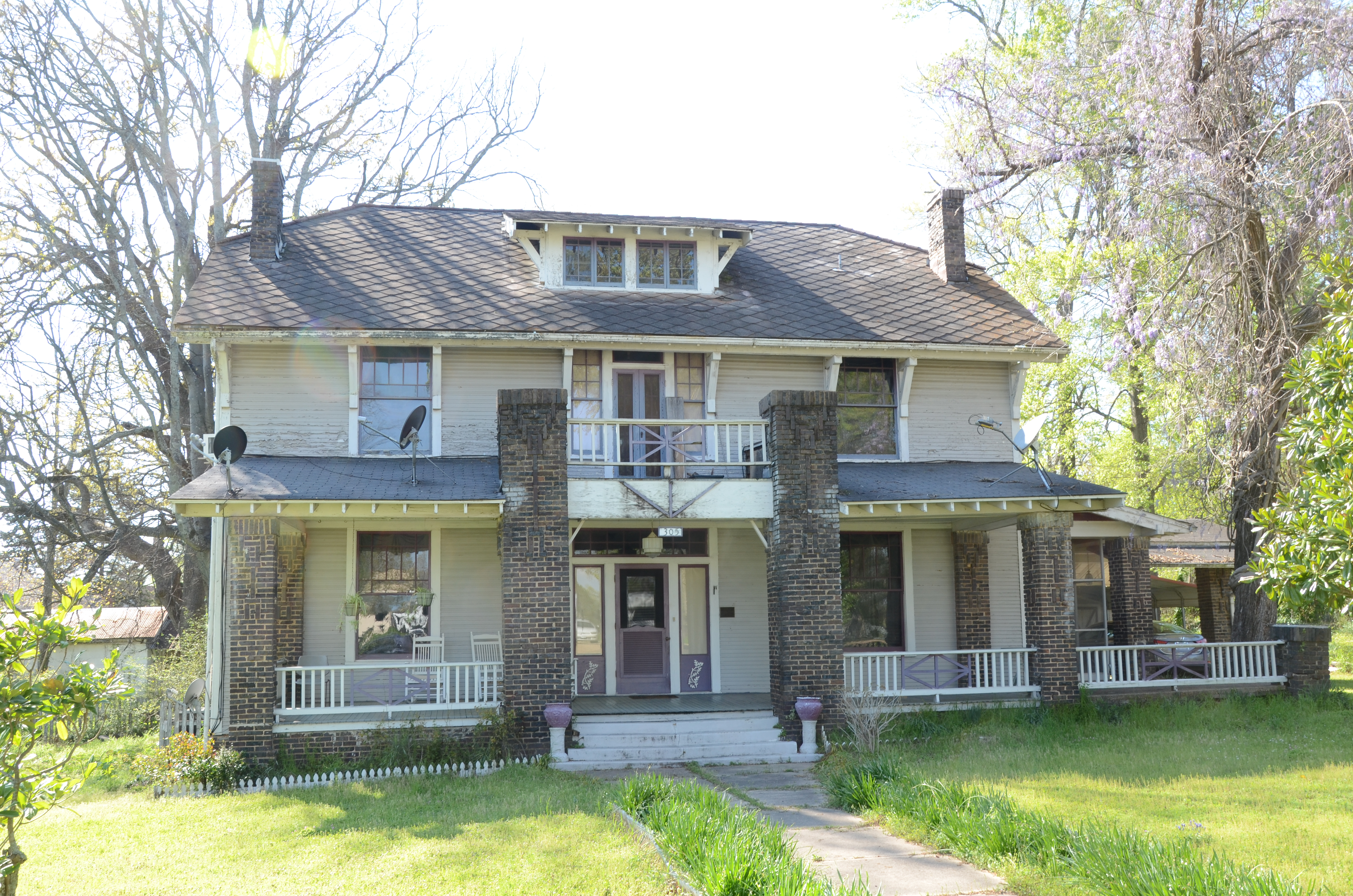

- Location within Arkansas Location within the United States
- Location: 305 Chestnut, Lewisville, Arkansas
- Coordinates: 33°21′29″N 93°34′44″W
- Area: 2 acres (0.81 ha)
- Built by: Percy Duffield Burton
- Architectural style: Bungalow/American Craftsman
- NRHP reference No.: 98000612
- Added to NRHP: June 3, 1998

The P. D. Burton House is a historic house at 305 Chestnut Street in Lewisville, Arkansas. The two-story wood-frame house, built in 1916 for Percy Duffield Burtun, is an excellent local example of American Craftsman architecture. Its features include a jerkinhead roof with exposed rafter ends, and a porch supported by large brick piers and large brackets.

The house was listed on the National Register of Historic Places in 1998.

== See also ==
- National Register of Historic Places listings in Lafayette County, Arkansas
