= Ormand =

Ormand is a surname. Notable people with the surname include:

- Danny Ormand (fl. c. 1998–2012), American fire chief and county sheriff
- Francis Ormand Jonathan Smith (1806–1876), American lawyer, legislator, telegraph pioneer, and financier
- Roger Ormand (c. 1740–1775), North Carolinian statesman

== See also ==
- Ormond (disambiguation)
