= 2004 Arkansas Democratic presidential primary =

- May 18, 2004

47 Democratic National Convention delegates (36 pledged, 11 unpledged) The number of pledged delegates received is determined by the popular vote
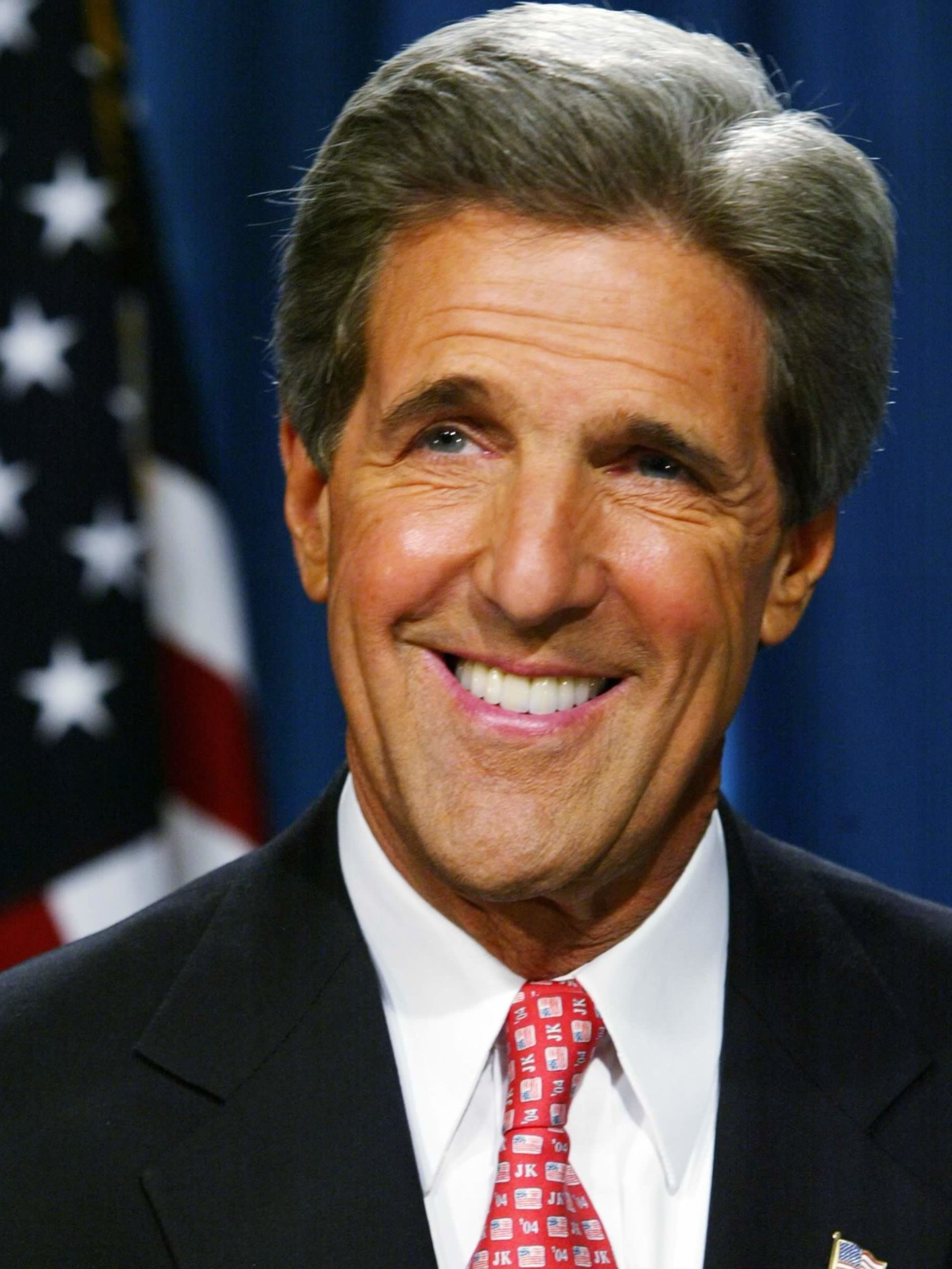

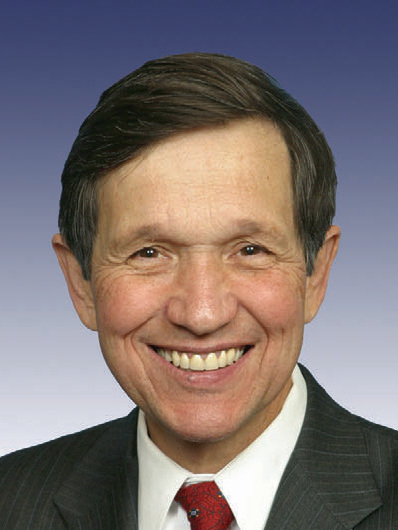

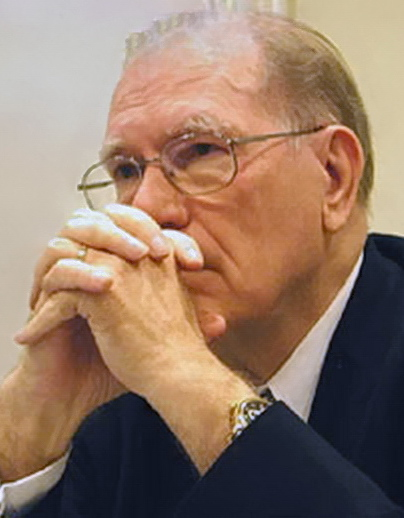
Candidate	John Kerry	Uncommitted
Home state	Massachusetts	–
Delegate count	27	9
Popular vote	177,754	61,800
Percentage	66.61%	23.16%
Candidate	Dennis Kucinich	Lyndon LaRouche
Home state	Ohio	Virginia
Delegate count	0	0
Popular vote	13,766	13,528
Percentage	5.16%	5.07%
- County results Kerry: 45–50% 50–55% 55–60% 60–65% 65–70% 70–75% 75–80% 80–85% 85–90%

The 2004 Arkansas Democratic presidential primary was held on May 18 in the U.S. state of Arkansas as one of the Democratic Party's statewide nomination contests ahead of the 2004 presidential election.

== Results ==
2004 Arkansas Democratic presidential primary
Candidate	Votes	%	Delegates
John Kerry	177,754	66.61	27
Uncommitted	61,800	23.16	9
Dennis Kucinich	13,766	5.16	0
Lyndon LaRouche	13,528	5.07	0
Total	266,848	100%	36

== See also ==
- 2004 Democratic Party presidential primaries
- 2004 United States presidential election in Arkansas
