= Danny Ormand =

American law enforcement officer

Danny Ormand is a retired State of Arkansas employee. He was previously the Fire Chief of Stamps, Arkansas and the County Sheriff of Lafayette County, He has since retired in 2012. He was the Deputy Director for the Arkansas Dept. of Emergency Management and had worked in Emergency Management for 14 years.
