= Lafayette County School District (Arkansas) =

School district in Arkansas, United States

Location
- 712 Chestnut Street; Lewisville, Arkansas 71845 United States

District information
- Type: Public (government funded)
- Accreditation: Arkansas Department of Education (ADE)
- Schools: 2
- NCES District ID: 0500065

Students and staff
- Students: 663

Other information
- Website: www.lcscougars.org

Lafayette County School District is a school district in Lafayette County, Arkansas. It administers an elementary school and a high school. It offers education for students from Pre-K through 12th grade.

It was established on July 1, 2003, when the Lewisville School District consolidated with the Stamps School District.

In addition to Lafayette County it also serves a section of Miller County, which houses Garland.

== Schools ==
- Lafayette County Elementary School
- Lafayette County High School
