= Gin City, Arkansas =

- Unincorporated community
- Location within Arkansas Location within the United States
- Coordinates: 33°06′25″N 93°43′23″W
- Country: United States
- State: Arkansas
- County: Lafayette
- Elevation: 210 ft (64 m)
- GNIS feature ID: 57818

Gin City is an unincorporated community in Lafayette County, Arkansas, United States.
