= Canfield, Arkansas =

- Unincorporated community
- Location within Arkansas Location within the United States
- Coordinates: 33°10′58″N 93°37′58″W
- Country: United States
- State: Arkansas
- County: Lafayette
- Elevation: 262 ft (80 m)
- Time zone: UTC-6 (Central (CST))
  - Summer (DST): UTC-5 (CDT)
- Area code: 870
- GNIS feature ID: 47444

Canfield is an unincorporated community in Lafayette County, Arkansas, United States.
