= Stamps School District =

Defunct school district in Arkansas, United States

Stamps School District was a school district headquartered in Stamps, Arkansas.

On July 1, 2003, it consolidated with the Lewisville School District to form the Lafayette County School District.
