= Stamps, Arkansas =

- City
- Location in Lafayette County, Arkansas
- Coordinates: 33°21′29″N 93°30′01″W
- Country: United States
- State: Arkansas
- County: Lafayette

Government
  - Mayor: Stacie Mitchell-Gweah

Area
  - Total: 3.15 sq mi (8.17 km^{2})
  - Land: 3.05 sq mi (7.91 km^{2})
  - Water: 0.10 sq mi (0.26 km^{2})
- Elevation: 262 ft (80 m)

Population (2020)
  - Total: 1,258
  - Estimate (2025): 1,181 ▼
  - Density: 412.1/sq mi (159.12/km^{2})
- Time zone: UTC−6 (Central (CST))
  - Summer (DST): UTC−5 (CDT)
- ZIP Code: 71860
- Area code: 870
- FIPS code: 05-66320
- GNIS feature ID: 2405518
- Website: stampsar.gov

Stamps is a city in Lafayette County, Arkansas, United States. The population was 1,206 in 2024, a 28.78% decrease from the figure of 1,693 in 2010.

== History ==
A post office has been in operation in Stamps since 1887. The community has the name of the local Stamps family. Stamps was the shop headquarters for the former Louisiana and Arkansas Railway until the relocation in the early 1920s to Minden in Webster Parish in northern Louisiana.

Stamps has been noted on lists of unusual place names. An early postmaster quipped that Stamps was "the only town in the U.S. that stamps Stamps on stamps".

== Geography ==
Stamps is in northeastern Lafayette County in southwestern Arkansas. U.S. Route 82 passes through the northern side of the city, leading west 5 miles (8 km) to Lewisville, the county seat, and east 3 miles (5 km) to Buckner. Arkansas Highway 53 has its northern terminus at US 82 and leads south through the center of Stamps 27 miles (43 km) to the state line near Springhill, Louisiana.

According to the United States Census Bureau, the city has a total area of 3.1 square miles (8.1 km^{2}), of which 3.1 square miles (7.9 km^{2}) are land and 0.1 square miles (0.3 km^{2}), or 3.19%, are water. Lake June lies within the southern part of the city limits.

== Demographics ==
Historical population
Census	Pop.	Note	%±
1900	1,021		—
1910	2,316		126.8%
1920	2,564		10.7%
1930	2,705		5.5%
1940	2,405		−11.1%
1950	2,552		6.1%
1960	2,591		1.5%
1970	2,448		−5.5%
1980	2,859		16.8%
1990	2,478		−13.3%
2000	2,131		−14.0%
2010	1,693		−20.6%
2020	1,258		−25.7%
2025 (est.)	1,181	▼	−6.1%
U.S. Decennial Census

=== 2020 census ===
As of the 2020 census, Stamps had a population of 1,258. The median age was 44.6 years. 21.9% of residents were under the age of 18 and 21.9% were 65 years of age or older. For every 100 females, there were 87.2 males, and for every 100 females age 18 and over, there were 81.7 males.

0.0% of residents lived in urban areas, while 100.0% lived in rural areas.

There were 552 households in Stamps, of which 29.9% had children under the age of 18 living in them. Of all households, 28.3% were married-couple households, 22.8% were households with a male householder and no spouse or partner present, and 42.4% were households with a female householder and no spouse or partner present. About 38.6% of all households were made up of individuals and 15.2% had someone living alone who was 65 years of age or older.

There were 764 housing units, of which 27.7% were vacant. The homeowner vacancy rate was 5.2% and the rental vacancy rate was 17.5%.

Racial composition as of the 2020 census
Race	Number	Percent
White	492	39.1%
Black or African American	697	55.4%
American Indian and Alaska Native	7	0.6%
Asian	6	0.5%
Native Hawaiian and Other Pacific Islander	0	0.0%
Some other race	5	0.4%
Two or more races	51	4.1%
Hispanic or Latino (of any race)	24	1.9%

=== 2000 census ===
As of the census of 2000, there were 2,131 people, 830 households, and 541 families residing in the town. The population density was 693.7 inhabitants per square mile (267.8/km^{2}). There were 1,003 housing units at an average density of 326.5 per square mile (126.1/km^{2}). The racial makeup of the city was 44.30% White, 54.48% Black or African American, 0.52% Native American, 0.09% Asian, 0.05% Pacific Islander, and 0.56% from two or more races. Of the population 0.61% was Hispanic or Latino of any race.

There were 830 households, out of which 30.7% had children under the age of 18 living with them, 37.8% were married couples living together, 21.7% had a female householder with no husband present, and 34.7% were non-families. Of all households 31.7% were made up of individuals, and 17.6% had someone living alone who was 65 years of age or older. The average household size was 2.46 and the average family size was 3.10.

In the city, the population was spread out, with 27.1% under the age of 18, 9.1% from 18 to 24, 23.7% from 25 to 44, 20.6% from 45 to 64, and 19.5% who were 65 years of age or older. The median age was 37 years. For every 100 females, there were 87.6 males. For every 100 females age 18 and over, there were 77.6 males.

The median income for a household in the town was $22,194, and the median income for a family was $26,591. Males had a median income of $25,667 versus $17,125 for females. The per capita income for the city was $11,440. About 22.8% of families and 27.8% of the population were below the poverty line, including 31.0% of those under age 18 and 24.2% of those age 65 or over.

== Education ==
Public education for elementary and secondary students is provided by the Lafayette County School District, which includes Lafayette County Elementary School and Lafayette County High School. The school's mascot and athletic emblem is the Cougar.

On July 1, 2003, the Stamps School District consolidated with the Lewisville School District to form the Lafayette County district.

== Infrastructure ==
=== Highways ===
- U.S. Highway 82
- Arkansas Highway 53

== Notable people ==
- Maya Angelou (1928–2014), author and poet, tells about growing up in the Black community of Stamps in I Know Why the Caged Bird Sings
- Black Ivory King (1899–1947), blues and boogie-woogie pianist, best known for his original version of the then popular train blues song, "The Flying Crow".
- George Doherty (1920–1987), math and PE teacher in Stamps – football player and inspirational coach
- Danny Ormand, retired Arkansas state employee, former Stamps Fire Chief
- Earl T. Ricks (1908–1954), raised in Stamps – United States Air Force major general
- Rolling Thunder (1916–1997), born in Stamps – self-identified hippie medicine man

== Gallery ==
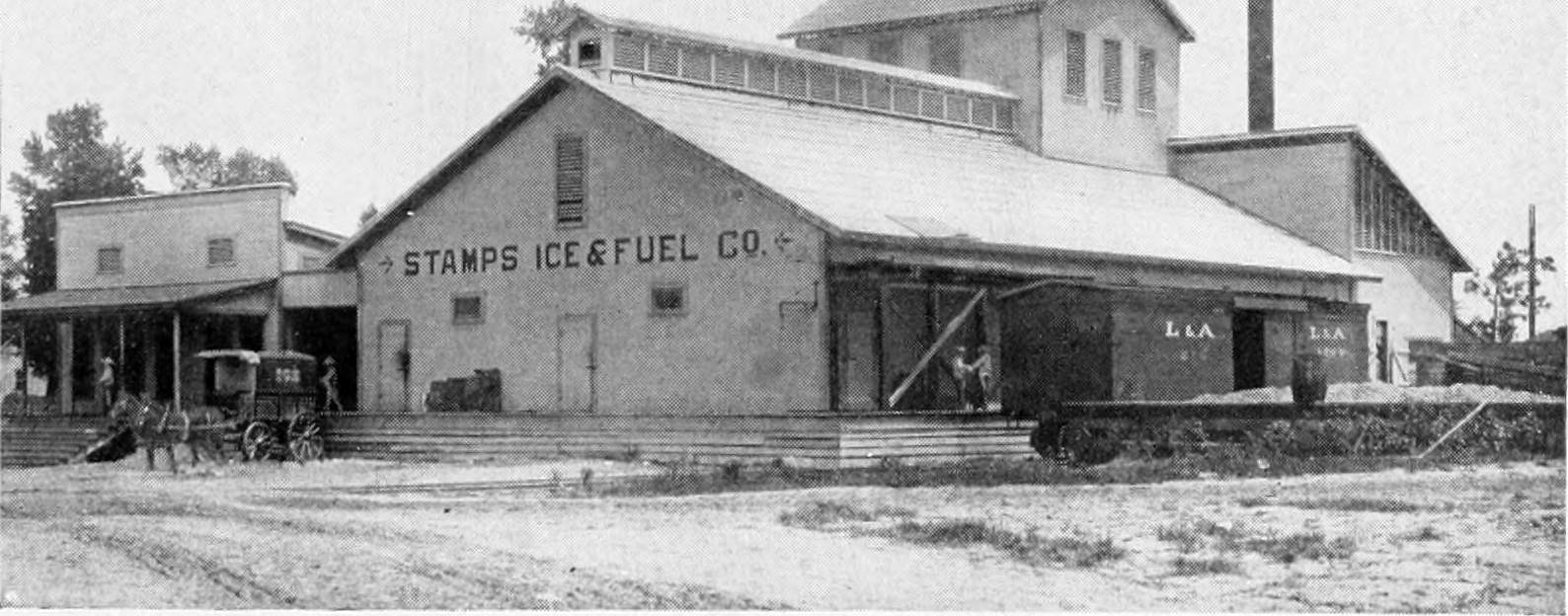
Stamps Ice & Fuel Company and a boxcar of the Louisiana and Arkansas Railway, c. 1904

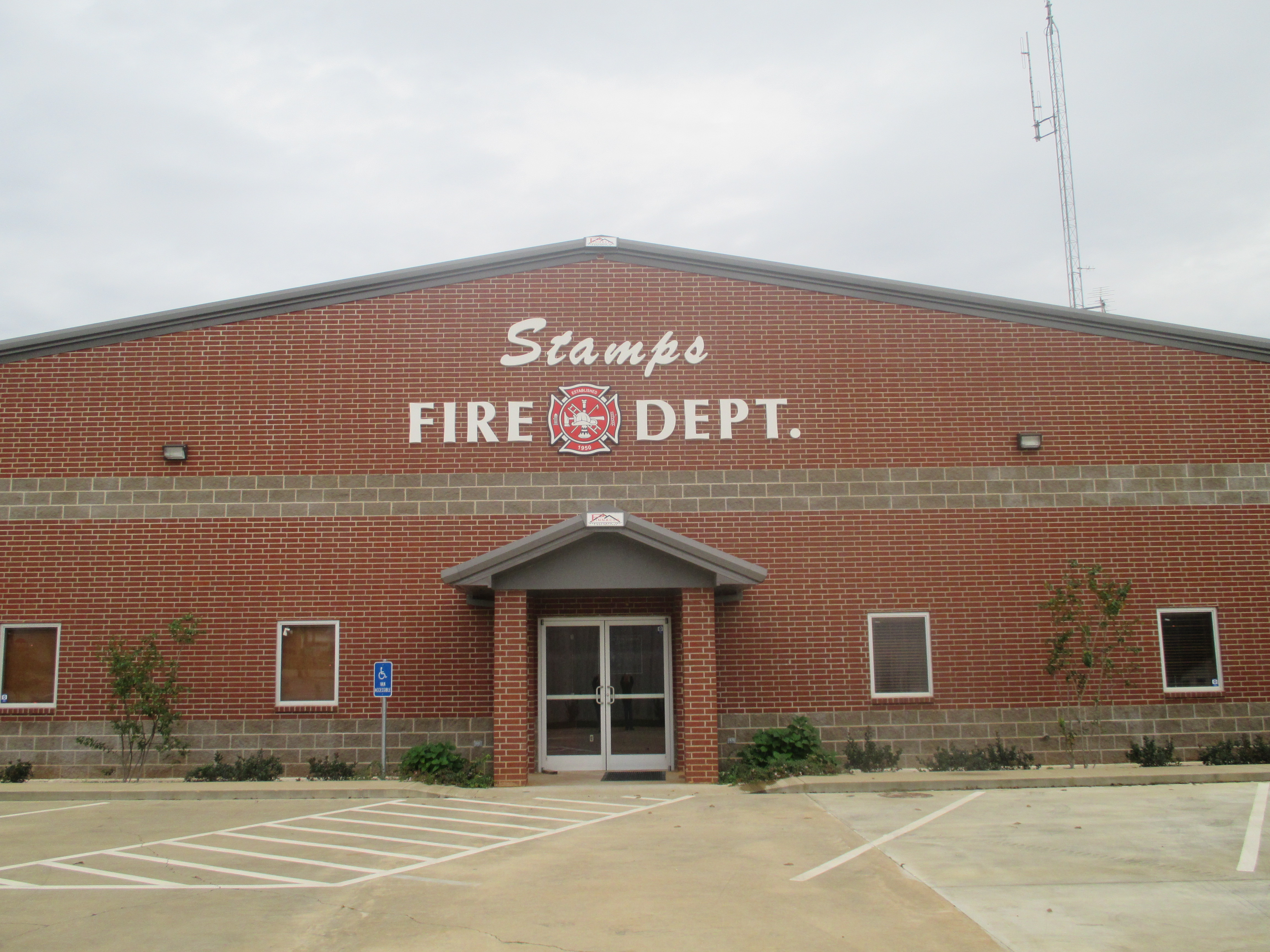
Stamps Fire Department

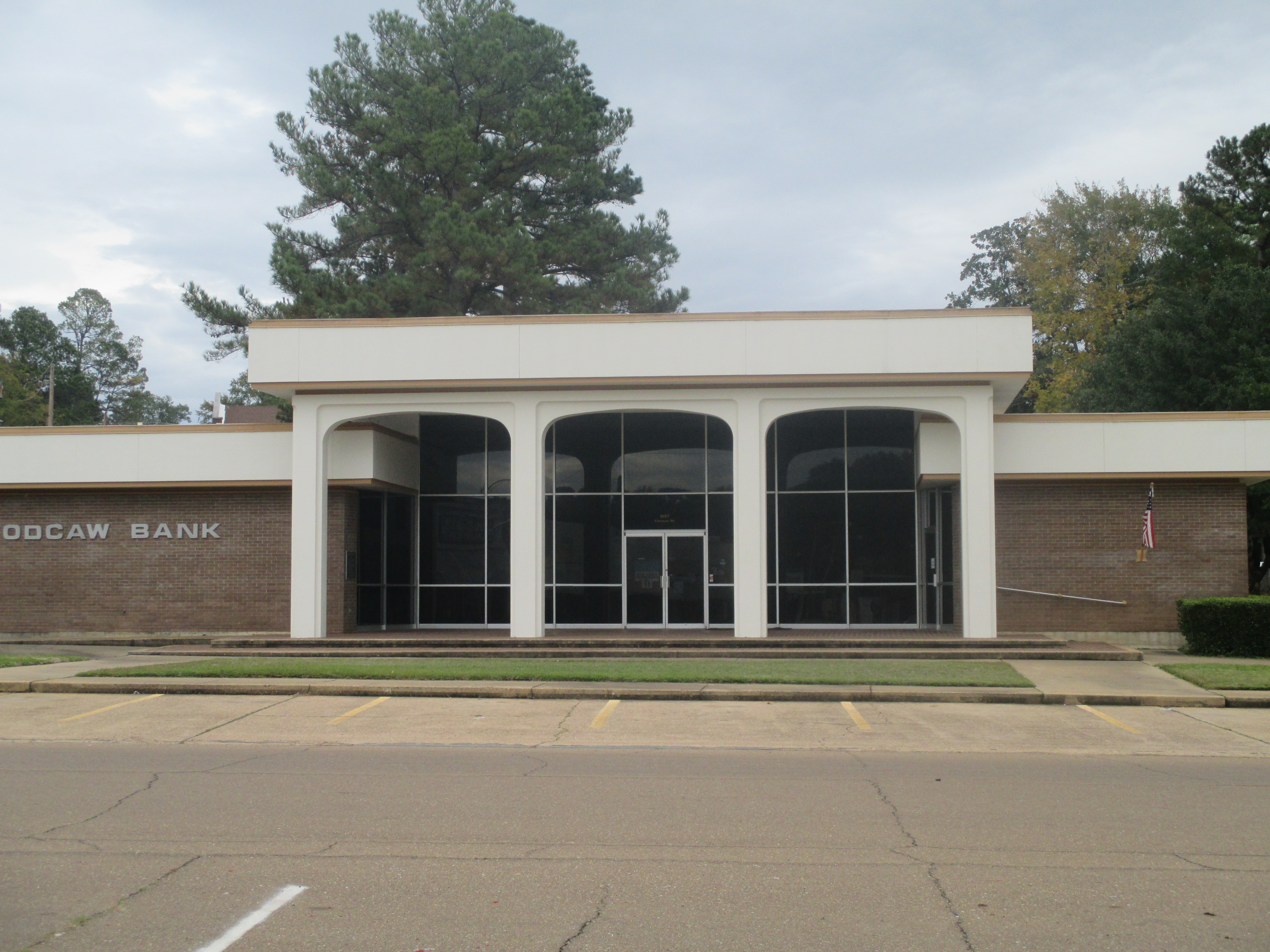
Bodcaw Bank in Stamps

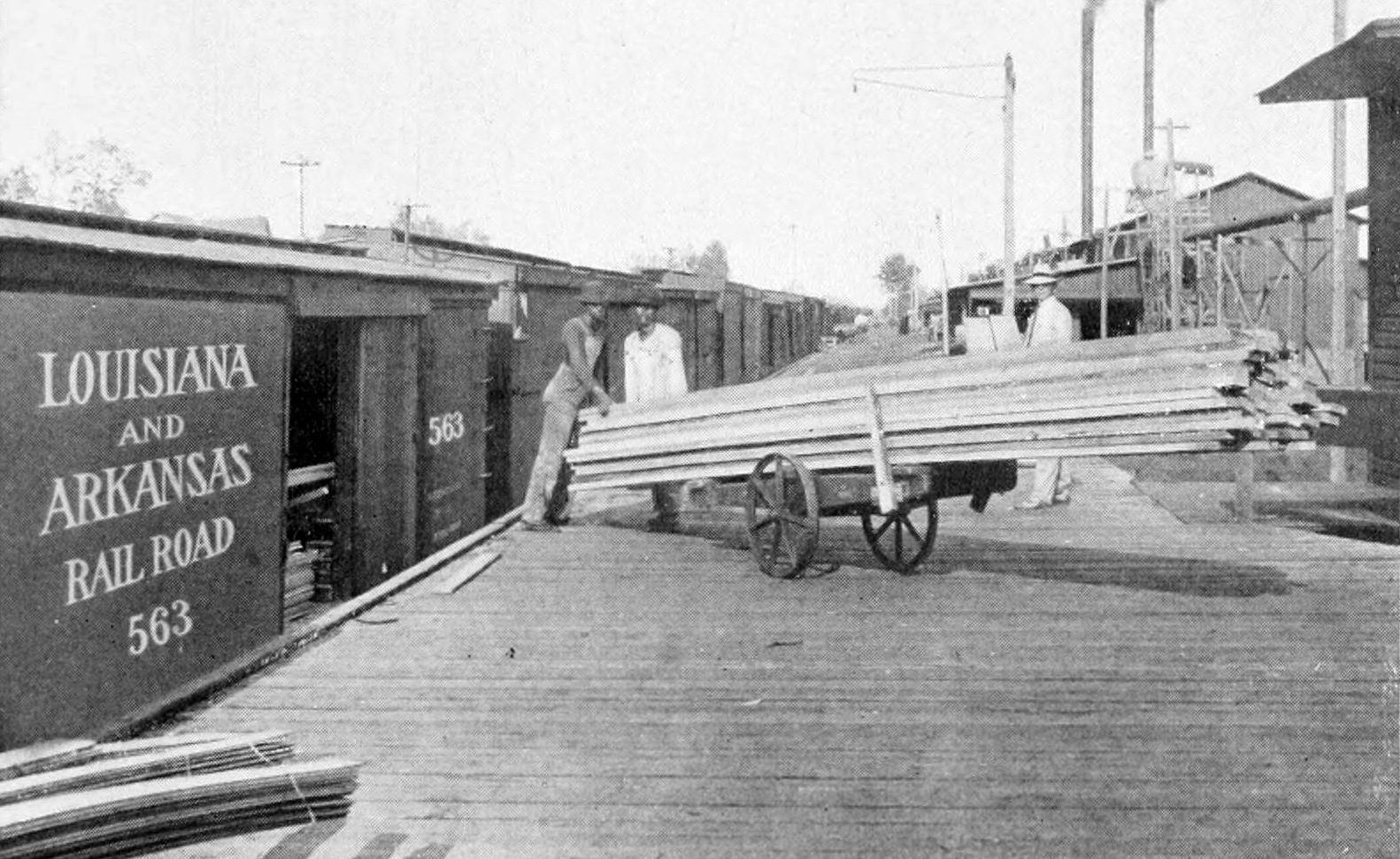
Loading lumber in Stamps, Arkansas, 1904
