= Lafayette County, Arkansas =

County in Arkansas, United States

- County
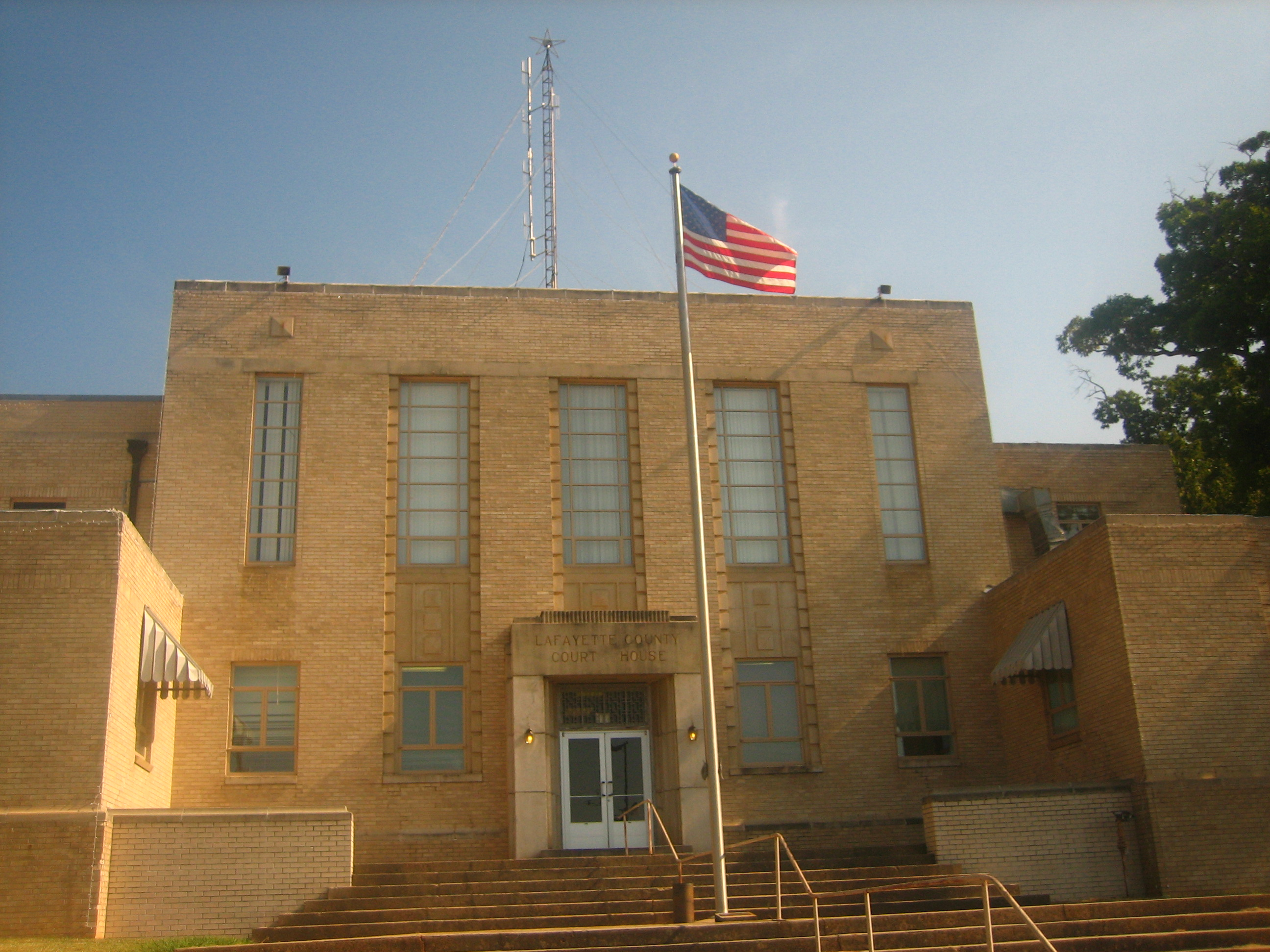
- Lafayette County Courthouse, Lewisville

- Location within the U.S. state of Arkansas
- Coordinates: 33°15′51″N 93°35′34″W
- Country: United States
- State: Arkansas
- Founded: October 15, 1827
- Named for: Marquis de Lafayette
- Seat: Lewisville
- Largest town: Stamps

Area
  - Total: 545 sq mi (1,410 km^{2})
  - Land: 528 sq mi (1,370 km^{2})
  - Water: 17 sq mi (44 km^{2}) 3.1%

Population (2020)
  - Total: 6,308
  - Estimate (2025): 5,888 ▼
  - Density: 11.9/sq mi (4.61/km^{2})
- Time zone: UTC−6 (Central)
  - Summer (DST): UTC−5 (CDT)
- ZIP Codes: 71826, 71827, 71845, 71860, 71861
- Area code: 870
- Congressional district: 4th
- Website: www.lafayettecounty.arkansas.gov

Lafayette County /lɑːˈfeɪɛt/ is a county located in the U.S. state of Arkansas. As of the 2020 census, the population was 6,308, making it the third-least populous county in Arkansas. The county seat is Lewisville. Lafayette County was formed on October 15, 1827, and named in honor of the Marquis de Lafayette, a French military hero of the American Revolutionary War. It is a dry county; therefore, the sale of alcohol is prohibited.

== Geography ==
According to the U.S. Census Bureau, the county has a total area of 545 square miles (1,410 km^{2}), of which 528 square miles (1,370 km^{2}) is land and 17 square miles (44 km^{2}) (3.1%) is water. It is the smallest county in Arkansas by area.

=== Major highways ===
- U.S. Highway 82
- Highway 29
- Highway 53
- Highway 160
- Highway 313
- Highway 360

=== Adjacent counties ===
- Hempstead County (north)
- Nevada County (northeast)
- Columbia County (east)
- Webster Parish, Louisiana (southeast)
- Bossier Parish, Louisiana (south)
- Caddo Parish, Louisiana (southwest)
- Miller County (west)

== Demographics ==
Historical population
Census	Pop.	Note	%±
1830	748		—
1840	2,200		194.1%
1850	5,220		137.3%
1860	8,464		62.1%
1870	9,139		8.0%
1880	5,730		−37.3%
1890	7,700		34.4%
1900	10,594		37.6%
1910	13,741		29.7%
1920	15,522		13.0%
1930	16,934		9.1%
1940	16,851		−0.5%
1950	13,203		−21.6%
1960	11,030		−16.5%
1970	10,018		−9.2%
1980	10,213		1.9%
1990	9,643		−5.6%
2000	8,559		−11.2%
2010	7,645		−10.7%
2020	6,308		−17.5%
2025 (est.)	5,888	▼	−6.7%
U.S. Decennial Census; 1790–1960 1900–1990; 1990–2000 2010

=== 2020 census ===
As of the 2020 census, the county had a population of 6,308. The median age was 46.9 years. 19.5% of residents were under the age of 18 and 23.2% of residents were 65 years of age or older. For every 100 females there were 96.4 males, and for every 100 females age 18 and over there were 94.0 males age 18 and over.

The racial makeup of the county was 61.9% White, 32.6% Black or African American, 0.6% American Indian and Alaska Native, 0.5% Asian, 0.1% Native Hawaiian and Pacific Islander, 0.8% from some other race, and 3.6% from two or more races. Hispanic or Latino residents of any race comprised 2.3% of the population.

<0.1% of residents lived in urban areas, while 100.0% lived in rural areas.

There were 2,842 households in the county, of which 24.9% had children under the age of 18 living in them. Of all households, 40.6% were married-couple households, 23.0% were households with a male householder and no spouse or partner present, and 30.2% were households with a female householder and no spouse or partner present. About 34.5% of all households were made up of individuals and 16.2% had someone living alone who was 65 years of age or older.

There were 3,916 housing units, of which 27.4% were vacant. Among occupied housing units, 75.5% were owner-occupied and 24.5% were renter-occupied. The homeowner vacancy rate was 2.6% and the rental vacancy rate was 16.5%.

=== 2000 census ===
As of the 2000 United States census, there were 8,559 people, 3,434 households, and 2,376 families residing in the county. The population density was 16 people per square mile (6.2 people/km^{2}). There were 4,560 housing units at an average density of 9 per square mile (3.5/km^{2}). The racial makeup of the county was 62.08% White, 36.49% Black or African American, 0.37% Native American, 0.22% Asian, 0.01% Pacific Islander, 0.20% from other races, and 0.63% from two or more races. 1.03% of the population were Hispanic or Latino of any race.

There were 3,434 households, out of which 27.90% had children under the age of 18 living with them, 50.60% were married couples living together, 14.40% had a female householder with no husband present, and 30.80% were non-families. 28.40% of all households were made up of individuals, and 14.60% had someone living alone who was 65 years of age or older. The average household size was 2.46 and the average family size was 3.00.

In the county, the population was spread out, with 25.40% under the age of 18, 8.10% from 18 to 24, 24.40% from 25 to 44, 24.40% from 45 to 64, and 17.70% who were 65 years of age or older. The median age was 39 years. For every 100 females, there were 93.60 males. For every 100 females age 18 and over, there were 87.80 males.

The median income for a household in the county was $24,831, and the median income for a family was $30,720. Males had a median income of $26,492 versus $17,000 for females. The per capita income for the county was $14,128. About 18.70% of families and 23.20% of the population were below the poverty line, including 31.50% of those under age 18 and 19.30% of those age 65 or over.

== Economics ==
The major economic activities in Lafayette Country are agriculture (including livestock and poultry), logging (especially pine), and oil production.

The discovery of significant quantities of lithium in the brines of the Smackover geological formation has resulted in early commercial activity to develop economic lithium resource mining and production in the county. A 2022 report estimated that the lithium brine in the formation has "sufficient lithium to produce enough batteries for 50 million electric vehicles" and may hold five to 19 million tons of lithium. By 2025, results from multiple exploration wells in the county had found an average lithium concentration of 582 mg/L (4,860 lb/million US gal) of subsurface brine, including the highest concentration yet reported in the entire Smackover formation. A commercial production decision for a 50 square miles (130 km^{2}) project area south of Lewisville, Stamps, and Buckner is expected by the end of 2025.

== Government ==
=== Government ===
The county government is a constitutional body granted specific powers by the Constitution of Arkansas and the Arkansas Code. The quorum court is the legislative branch of the county government and controls all spending and revenue collection. Representatives are called justices of the peace and are elected from county districts every even-numbered year. The number of districts in a county vary from nine to fifteen, and district boundaries are drawn by the county election commission. The Lafayette County Quorum Court has nine members. Presiding over quorum court meetings is the county judge, who serves as the chief operating officer of the county. The county judge is elected at-large and does not vote in quorum court business, although capable of vetoing quorum court decisions.

Lafayette County, Arkansas Elected countywide officials
Position	Officeholder	Party
County Judge	Valarie Clark	Republican
County Clerk	Angela Brazell	Republican
Circuit Clerk	Dana Phillips	Republican
Sheriff	Jeff Black	Republican
Treasurer/Collector	Michelle Perkison	Republican
Assessor	Billie Jo Pierson	Republican
Coroner	William C. "Bill" Powell	Republican

The composition of the Quorum Court following the 2024 elections is 5 Republicans, 3 Democrats, and 1 Independent. Justices of the Peace (members) of the Quorum Court following the elections are:

- District 1: Jeremy Kitchens (R)
- District 2: Linda D. Goodner (R)
- District 3: Charles H. Goodwin (R)
- District 4: Rex Lenard (R)
- District 5: LeNora Jackson (D)
- District 6: Catherine Ann Rone (D)
- District 7: Horace M. Hight (R)
- District 8: Stephanie Harris (D)
- District 9: Jimmy Brackman (I)

Additionally, the townships of Lafayette County are entitled to elect their own respective constables, as set forth by the Constitution of Arkansas. Constables are largely of historical significance as they were used to keep the peace in rural areas when travel was more difficult. The township constables as of the 2024 elections are:

- District 1: Braxton Ben Butler (I)

=== Politics ===
Prior to 2000, Lafayette County was considered an "ancestral" Democratic county among white conservatives. Exceptions were the 1972 and 1984 landslides of Republicans Richard Nixon and Ronald Reagan, respectively.

Former Governor Bill Clinton of Arkansas, considered a son of the South, won this county twice in his presidential runs: 1992 and 1996. Clinton's vice president, Al Gore of Tennessee, another son of the South, won the county in 2000, the most recent Democrat to do so. Most of the African-American voters have been affiliated with the national Democratic Party since the 1960s, even as conservative whites here shifted to the Republican Party.

United States presidential election results for Lafayette County, Arkansas
Year	Republican		Democratic		Third party(ies)	
Year	No.	%	No.	%	No.	%
1896	423	40.83%	608	58.69%	5	0.48%
1900	448	51.44%	422	48.45%	1	0.11%
1904	566	46.66%	614	50.62%	33	2.72%
1908	552	42.11%	739	56.37%	20	1.53%
1912	208	23.88%	498	57.18%	165	18.94%
1916	365	29.06%	891	70.94%	0	0.00%
1920	500	34.25%	954	65.34%	6	0.41%
1924	298	24.53%	788	64.86%	129	10.62%
1928	435	30.48%	991	69.45%	1	0.07%
1932	151	9.14%	1,495	90.50%	6	0.36%
1936	100	7.24%	1,279	92.55%	3	0.22%
1940	159	10.35%	1,352	88.02%	25	1.63%
1944	177	13.34%	1,150	86.66%	0	0.00%
1948	113	7.94%	700	49.16%	611	42.91%
1952	733	30.72%	1,637	68.61%	16	0.67%
1956	836	36.67%	1,348	59.12%	96	4.21%
1960	713	30.67%	1,286	55.31%	326	14.02%
1964	1,476	49.75%	1,484	50.02%	7	0.24%
1968	672	18.75%	1,208	33.71%	1,704	47.54%
1972	2,460	71.91%	952	27.83%	9	0.26%
1976	1,467	38.51%	2,342	61.49%	0	0.00%
1980	1,756	46.50%	1,947	51.56%	73	1.93%
1984	2,290	57.15%	1,695	42.30%	22	0.55%
1988	1,860	48.95%	1,915	50.39%	25	0.66%
1992	1,188	29.86%	2,273	57.12%	518	13.02%
1996	971	25.25%	2,466	64.14%	408	10.61%
2000	1,538	45.46%	1,806	53.38%	39	1.15%
2004	1,604	50.27%	1,567	49.11%	20	0.63%
2008	1,685	58.06%	1,133	39.04%	84	2.89%
2012	1,713	58.48%	1,173	40.05%	43	1.47%
2016	1,758	61.47%	1,032	36.08%	70	2.45%
2020	1,757	65.58%	839	31.32%	83	3.10%
2024	1,589	68.34%	698	30.02%	38	1.63%

== Communities ==
=== Towns ===
- Bradley
- Buckner
- Lewisville (county seat)
- Stamps

=== Townships ===
Townships in Arkansas are the divisions of a county. Each township includes unincorporated areas; some may have incorporated cities or towns within part of their boundaries. Arkansas townships have limited purposes in modern times. However, the United States census does list Arkansas population based on townships (sometimes referred to as "county subdivisions" or "minor civil divisions"). Townships are also of value for historical purposes in terms of genealogical research. Each town or city is within one or more townships in an Arkansas county based on census maps and publications. The townships of Lafayette County are listed below; listed in parentheses are the cities, towns, and/or census-designated places that are fully or partially inside the township.

- Baker (most of Stamps)
- French
- Hadley (Buckner, small part of Stamps)
- La Grange (small part of Lewisville)
- Mars Hill
- Roane (Bradley)
- Russell
- Steel (most of Lewisville)
- Walker Creek

== Education ==
There are two school districts in the county: Lafayette County School District and the Emerson-Taylor-Bradley School District. Previously the Bradley School District was the second district; it merged into Emerson-Taylor-Bradley in 2013.

== See also ==
- Honors and memorials to the Marquis de Lafayette
- List of counties in Arkansas
- List of lakes in Lafayette County, Arkansas
- National Register of Historic Places listings in Lafayette County, Arkansas
