= Lewisville, Arkansas =

- City
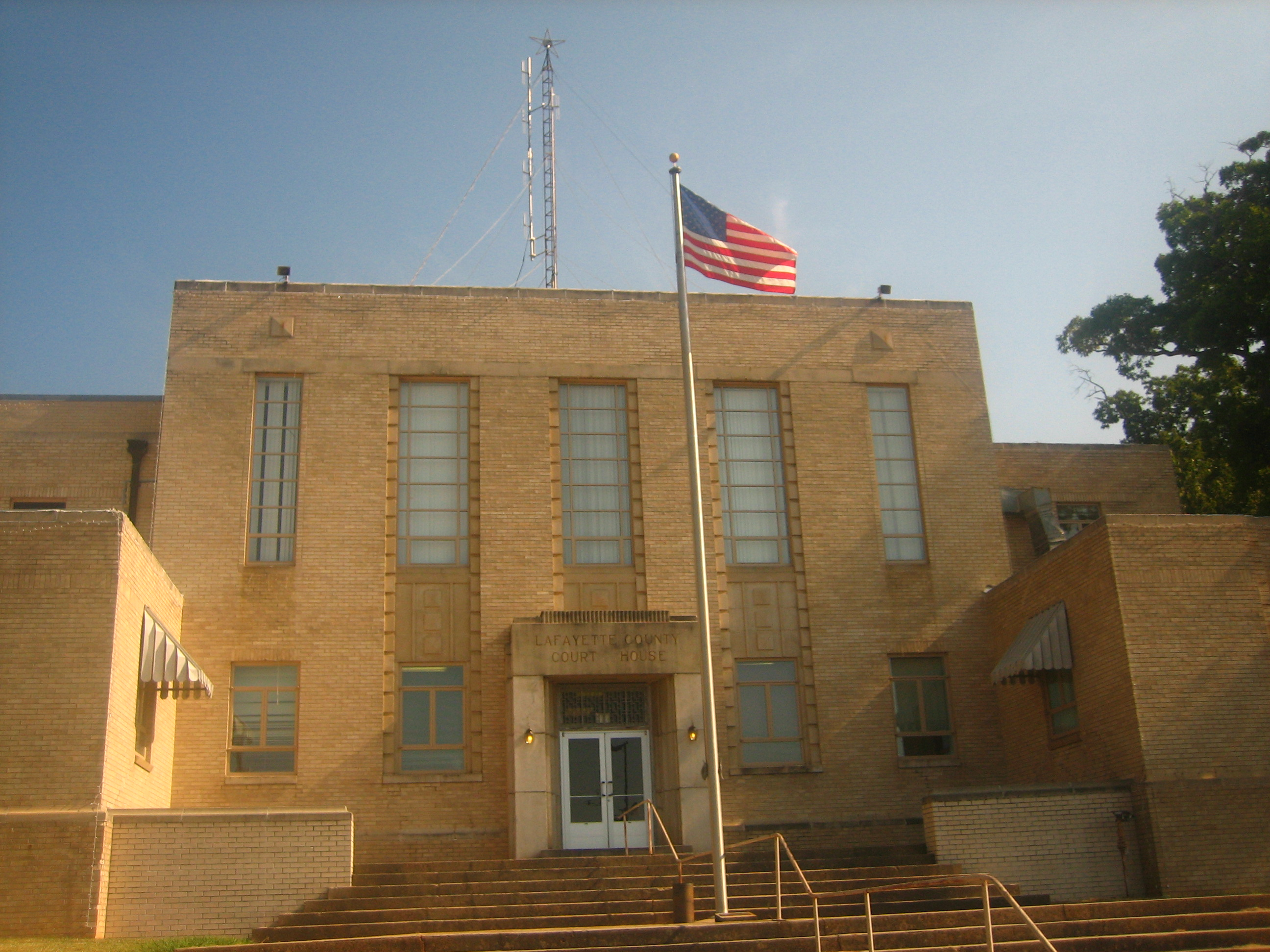
- Lafayette County Courthouse

- Location in Lafayette County, Arkansas
- Coordinates: 33°22′08″N 93°34′31″W
- Country: United States
- State: Arkansas
- County: Lafayette

Area
  - Total: 2.18 sq mi (5.65 km^{2})
  - Land: 2.15 sq mi (5.56 km^{2})
  - Water: 0.031 sq mi (0.08 km^{2})
- Elevation: 295 ft (90 m)

Population (2020)
  - Total: 915
  - Estimate (2025): 845 ▼
  - Density: 426.0/sq mi (164.48/km^{2})
- Time zone: UTC−06:00 (Central (CST))
  - Summer (DST): UTC−05:00 (CDT)
- ZIP Code: 71845
- Area code: 870
- FIPS code: 05-39640
- GNIS feature ID: 2404919
- Website: lewisvillear.com

Lewisville is a city in Lafayette County, Arkansas, United States. As of the 2020 census, Lewisville had a population of 915. It is the county seat of Lafayette County.

== Geography ==
Lewisville is located in northern Lafayette County. U.S. Route 82 passes through the south side of the city, leading east 23 miles (37 km) to Magnolia and west 30 miles (48 km) to Texarkana. Arkansas Highway 29 passes through the center of Lewisville, leading north 23 miles (37 km) to Hope and south 19 miles (31 km) to Bradley.

According to the United States Census Bureau, Lewisville has a total area of 2.2 square miles (5.7 km^{2}), of which 0.03 square miles (0.09 km^{2}), or 1.58%, are water.

=== Climate ===
According to the Köppen Climate Classification system, Lewisville has a humid subtropical climate, abbreviated "Cfa" on climate maps. The hottest temperature recorded in Lewisville was 112 °F (44.4 °C) on August 7 and 18, 2011, while the coldest temperature recorded was −1 °F (−18.3 °C) on February 16–17, 2021.

Climate data for Lewisville, Arkansas, 1991–2020 normals, extremes 1991–present
Month	Jan	Feb	Mar	Apr	May	Jun	Jul	Aug	Sep	Oct	Nov	Dec	Year
Record high °F (°C)	82 (28)	85 (29)	90 (32)	93 (34)	97 (36)	105 (41)	111 (44)	112 (44)	110 (43)	99 (37)	87 (31)	81 (27)	112 (44)
Mean maximum °F (°C)	73.6 (23.1)	76.4 (24.7)	82.6 (28.1)	85.8 (29.9)	89.8 (32.1)	94.8 (34.9)	99.2 (37.3)	100.2 (37.9)	97.1 (36.2)	89.9 (32.2)	80.0 (26.7)	74.4 (23.6)	101.8 (38.8)
Mean daily maximum °F (°C)	55.1 (12.8)	59.8 (15.4)	67.8 (19.9)	75.7 (24.3)	82.2 (27.9)	89.4 (31.9)	93.0 (33.9)	94.0 (34.4)	88.5 (31.4)	77.8 (25.4)	65.5 (18.6)	57.3 (14.1)	75.5 (24.2)
Daily mean °F (°C)	44.2 (6.8)	47.9 (8.8)	55.5 (13.1)	63.1 (17.3)	71.1 (21.7)	78.7 (25.9)	82.0 (27.8)	82.0 (27.8)	75.9 (24.4)	64.8 (18.2)	53.8 (12.1)	46.5 (8.1)	63.8 (17.7)
Mean daily minimum °F (°C)	33.2 (0.7)	36.1 (2.3)	43.2 (6.2)	50.6 (10.3)	60.0 (15.6)	68.0 (20.0)	71.0 (21.7)	70.0 (21.1)	63.3 (17.4)	51.9 (11.1)	42.0 (5.6)	35.7 (2.1)	52.1 (11.2)
Mean minimum °F (°C)	17.7 (−7.9)	22.5 (−5.3)	26.8 (−2.9)	34.6 (1.4)	45.6 (7.6)	58.3 (14.6)	64.2 (17.9)	63.1 (17.3)	50.1 (10.1)	37.0 (2.8)	27.4 (−2.6)	22.3 (−5.4)	15.8 (−9.0)
Record low °F (°C)	8 (−13)	−1 (−18)	13 (−11)	25 (−4)	37 (3)	51 (11)	57 (14)	49 (9)	40 (4)	27 (−3)	18 (−8)	7 (−14)	−1 (−18)
Average precipitation inches (mm)	4.38 (111)	4.79 (122)	4.90 (124)	4.93 (125)	4.96 (126)	4.31 (109)	3.84 (98)	3.28 (83)	3.72 (94)	4.61 (117)	4.15 (105)	5.08 (129)	52.95 (1,343)
Average snowfall inches (cm)	0.7 (1.8)	0.8 (2.0)	0.2 (0.51)	0.0 (0.0)	0.0 (0.0)	0.0 (0.0)	0.0 (0.0)	0.0 (0.0)	0.0 (0.0)	0.0 (0.0)	0.0 (0.0)	0.1 (0.25)	1.8 (4.56)
Average precipitation days (≥ 0.01 in)	8.3	9.2	9.2	8.0	8.6	7.6	6.9	5.9	5.4	7.0	7.7	8.6	92.4
Average snowy days (≥ 0.1 in)	0.2	0.5	0.1	0.0	0.0	0.0	0.0	0.0	0.0	0.0	0.0	0.1	0.9
Source 1: NOAA
Source 2: National Weather Service

== Demographics ==
Historical population
Census	Pop.	Note	%±
1880	301		—
1890	500		66.1%
1900	548		9.6%
1910	975		77.9%
1920	1,067		9.4%
1930	1,061		−0.6%
1940	1,314		23.8%
1950	1,237		−5.9%
1960	1,373		11.0%
1970	1,653		20.4%
1980	1,476		−10.7%
1990	1,424		−3.5%
2000	1,285		−9.8%
2010	1,280		−0.4%
2020	915		−28.5%
2025 (est.)	845	▼	−7.7%
U.S. Decennial Census

=== 2020 census ===
Lewisville city, Arkansas – Racial and ethnic composition Note: the US Census treats Hispanic/Latino as an ethnic category. This table excludes Latinos from the racial categories and assigns them to a separate category. Hispanics/Latinos may be of any race.
Race / Ethnicity (NH = Non-Hispanic)	Pop 2000	Pop 2010	Pop 2020	% 2000	% 2010	% 2020
White alone (NH)	616	516	306	47.94%	40.31%	33.44%
Black or African American alone (NH)	634	707	555	49.34%	55.23%	60.66%
Native American or Alaska Native alone (NH)	2	0	0	0.16%	0.00%	0.00%
Asian alone (NH)	0	0	1	0.00%	0.00%	0.11%
Native Hawaiian or Pacific Islander alone (NH)	0	0	2	0.00%	0.00%	0.22%
Other race alone (NH)	0	0	0	0.00%	0.00%	0.00%
Mixed race or Multiracial (NH)	6	20	27	0.47%	1.56%	2.95%
Hispanic or Latino (any race)	27	37	24	2.10%	2.89%	2.62%
Total	1,285	1,280	915	100.00%	100.00%	100.00%

As of the 2020 United States census, there were 915 people, 360 households, and 225 families residing in the city.

=== 2000 census ===
As of the census of 2000, there were 1,285 people, 518 households, and 349 families residing in the town. The population density was 583.7 inhabitants per square mile (225.4/km^{2}). There were 577 housing units at an average density of 262.1 per square mile (101.2/km^{2}). The racial makeup of the city was 49.34% White, 49.34% Black or African American, 0.16% Native American, 0.70% from other races, and 0.47% from two or more races. 2.10% of the population were Hispanic or Latino of any race.

There were 518 households, out of which 28.8% had children under the age of 18 living with them, 46.7% were married couples living together, 16.2% had a female householder with no husband present, and 32.6% were non-families. 30.1% of all households were made up of individuals, and 15.3% had someone living alone who was 65 years of age or older. The average household size was 2.47 and the average family size was 3.04.

In the city, the population was spread out, with 25.8% under the age of 18, 7.9% from 18 to 24, 25.7% from 25 to 44, 22.3% from 45 to 64, and 18.3% who were 65 years of age or older. The median age was 39 years. For every 100 females, there were 86.5 males. For every 100 females age 18 and over, there were 80.5 males.

The median income for a household in the town was $26,719, and the median income for a family was $34,712. Males had a median income of $24,408 versus $16,850 for females. The per capita income for the city was $13,733. About 17.2% of families and 21.3% of the population were below the poverty line, including 27.3% of those under age 18 and 16.1% of those age 65 or over.

== Education ==
Public education for elementary and secondary students is provided by the Lafayette County School District. On July 1, 2003, the Lewisville district consolidated with the Stamps School District to form the Lafayette County School District.

== Infrastructure ==
=== Highways ===
- U.S. Highway 82
- Arkansas Highway 29
- Arkansas Highway 313

== Gallery ==
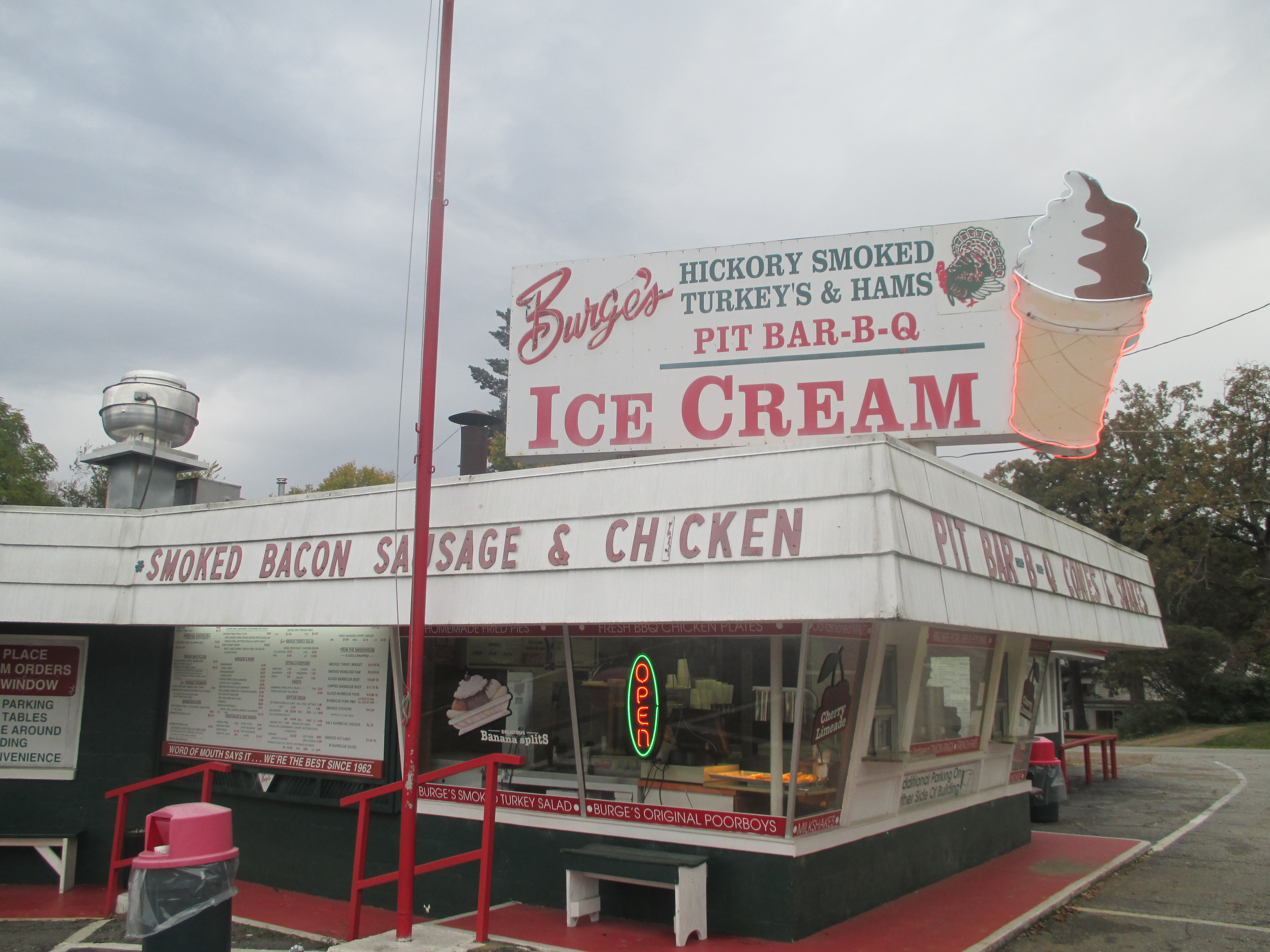
Burges BBQ and Ice Cream stand has existed in Lewisville since the early 1960s.

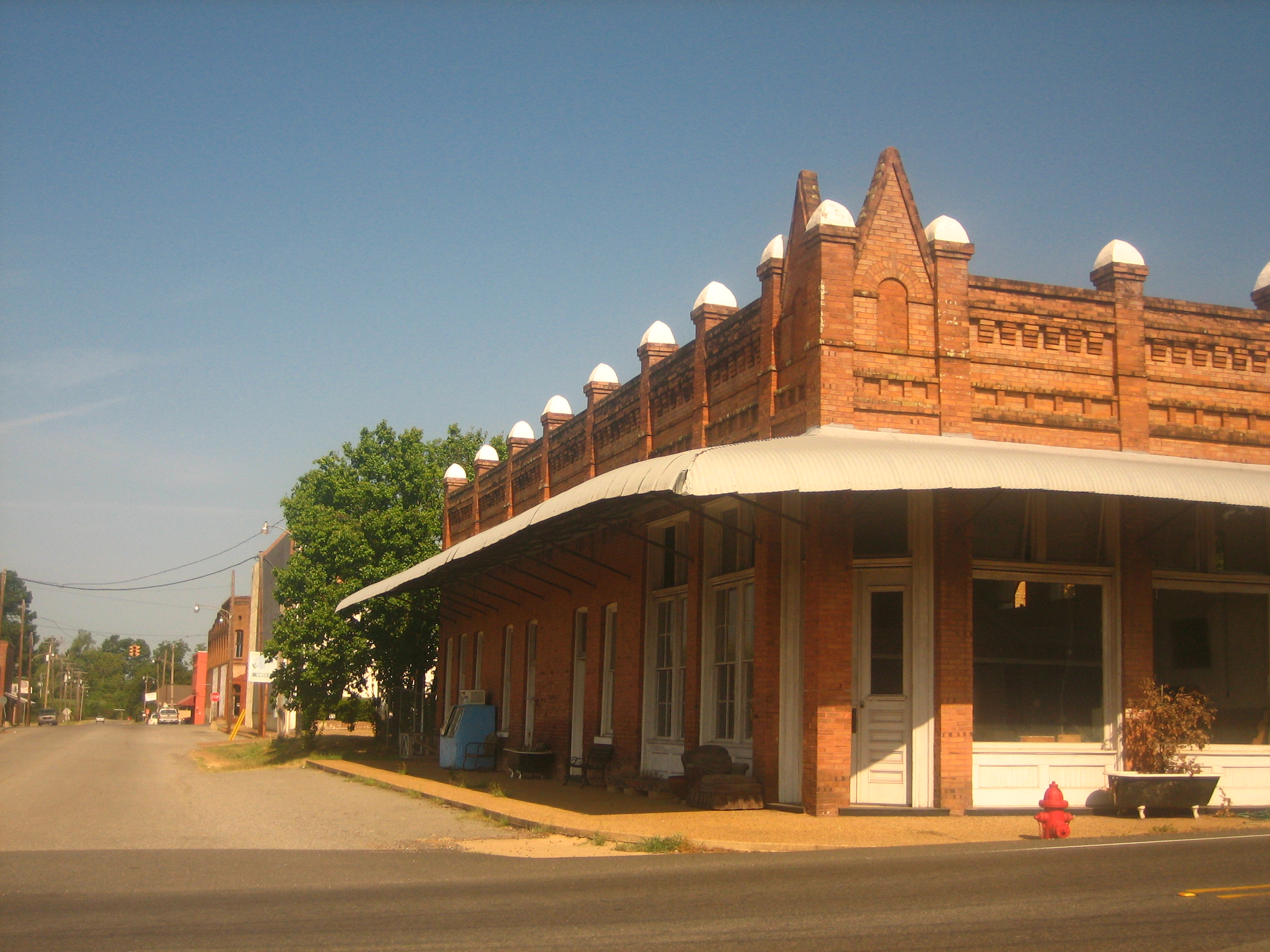
An abandoned historic building in downtown Lewisville

== Notable people ==
- Charles McClendon, former LSU football coach
