= Frog Level, North Carolina =

There are three communities in the U.S. state of North Carolina named Frog Level:

- Frog Level, Pitt County, North Carolina, a community on the outskirts of Greenville, North Carolina
- Frog Level, Rutherford County, North Carolina, a community in Spindale, North Carolina
- Frog Level, Waynesville, North Carolina, a neighborhood in western North Carolina municipality of Waynesville
  - Frog Level Historic District, Waynesville, North Carolina, a part of the neighborhood listed on the NRHP

== See also ==
- Frog Level (disambiguation)
