= Frog Level, Virginia =

There are two communities in the U.S. state of Virginia named Frog Level:

- Frog Level, Tazewell County, Virginia, a community in Southwest Virginia near the town of Tazewell
- Frog Level, Caroline County, Virginia, a community in eastern Virginia in southern Caroline County

== See also ==
- Frog Level (disambiguation)
