= WCPE =

Classical music public radio station in Wake Forest, North Carolina

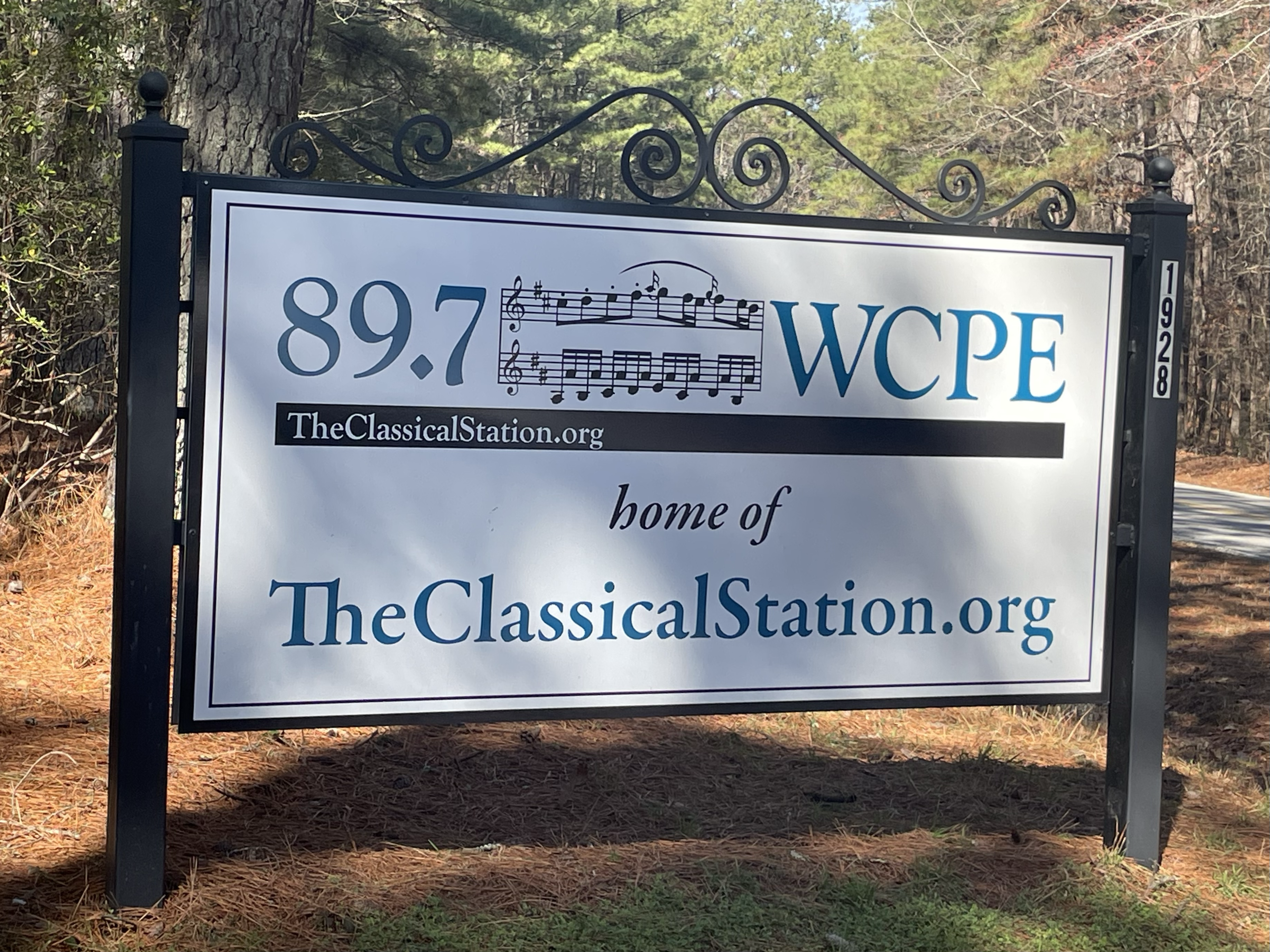
- Raleigh, North Carolina; United States
- Broadcast area: Research Triangle (Raleigh-Durham-Chapel Hill)
- Frequency: 89.7 MHz
- Branding: The Classical Station

Programming
- Format: Classical

Ownership
- Owner: Educational Information Corporation

History
- First air date: July 17, 1978

Technical information
- Licensing authority: FCC
- Facility ID: 18831
- Class: C
- ERP: 96,700 watts (100,000 with beam tilt)
- HAAT: 359 meters (1,178 ft)
- Transmitter coordinates: 35°56′25.5″N 78°28′44″W
- Translator: See § Simulcasts and translators
- Repeater: See § Simulcasts and translators

Links
- Public license information: Public file; LMS
- Webcast: Listen live
- Website: www.theclassicalstation.org

WCPE (89.7 FM) is a listener-supported non-commercial radio station licensed to Raleigh, North Carolina. It is the flagship of "The Classical Station," a classical music network owned by the Educational Information Corporation, a nonprofit organization. WCPE's studios and transmitter are off Chalk Road in Wake Forest, North Carolina.

WCPE has an effective radiated power (ERP) of 100,000 watts, the maximum for most FM stations. The signal covers the Research Triangle including Raleigh, Durham, Chapel Hill and a small section of Virginia. WCPE also known as “The Classical Music Station” operates three full-power satellite stations in the Outer Banks of Eastern North Carolina, as well as a network of low-powered translators across the state. It can also be heard on cable television systems and around the world via six streaming audio formats on the Internet, including mp3, AAC, Ogg Vorbis, QuickTime, RealAudio, iTunes, and WMA. The station also streams via IPv6.

== History ==
The station signed on the air on July 17, 1978. It was originally powered at 12,500 watts, a fraction of its current output. WCPE originally played classical music with specialty programs including jazz, R & B, hip hop and other modern musical genres, community, educational shows and news from the BBC World Service. It switched to an all-classical format in 1984. The station's call letters were randomly assigned..

In September 2023, WCPE sent a survey to listeners describing concerns over modern works in the Metropolitan Opera's upcoming season, writing that they were "written in a nonclassical music style, have adult themes and language, and are in English". The survey suggested that WCPE would not air the productions. Three of the works selected for exclusion were by Black or Mexican composers. After much national criticism and accusations of censorship, the station announced that it would broadcast the operas.

== Awards ==
In November 2002, WCPE and its founder and General Manager, Deborah Proctor were recognized by Senator Jesse Helms of North Carolina for her contribution in the Helms-Leahy Small Webcaster Settlement Act of 2002. This act helped settle a dispute regarding the amount of royalties webcasters must pay in order to perform sound recordings over the Internet bringing stability to the then-emerging webcasting industry.

On Saturday, November 6, 2019, founder and General Manager, Deborah Proctor was recognized by Governor Roy Cooper. Proctor was given North Carolina's highest civilian honor, the North Carolina Award. Proctor was recognized for her efforts to promote and help small, independent and public broadcasters remain viable in the era of online broadcasting.

== Simulcasts and translators ==
WCPE is simulcast full-time over full-power satellite stations WZPE and WURI. WZPE is owned by the Educational Information Corporation, while WURI is owned by the University of North Carolina at Chapel Hill and leased to WCPE.

Call sign	Frequency	City of license	FID	ERP (W)	HAAT	Class	Transmitter coordinates	FCC info
WZPE	90.1 FM	Bath, North Carolina	93744	4,500	39 m (128 ft)	A	35°28′32.5″N 76°48′42.7″W	LMS
WURI	90.9 FM	Manteo, North Carolina	91803	5,200	57 m (187 ft)	A	35°54′28.6″N 75°40′24.6″W	LMS

The following low-power translators rebroadcast WCPE:

Broadcast translators for WCPE
Call sign	Frequency	City of license	FID	ERP (W)	HAAT	Class	Transmitter coordinates	FCC info
W202BQ	88.3 FM	Aberdeen, North Carolina	93560	10	165.6 m (543 ft)	D	35°10′35.6″N 79°24′52.1″W	LMS
W219DW	91.7 FM	Buxton, North Carolina	89947	120	9.8 m (32 ft)	D	35°15′41.5″N 75°34′17.5″W	LMS
W237CM	95.3 FM	Fayetteville, North Carolina	145202	10	201.8 m (662 ft)	D	35°4′46.6″N 78°55′57.1″W	LMS
W205CA	88.9 FM	Foxfire, North Carolina	93559	27	56 m (184 ft)	D	35°10′29.5″N 79°35′45.1″W	LMS
W247BG	97.3 FM	Frog Level, North Carolina	145839	10	150.2 m (493 ft)	D	35°32′39.6″N 77°21′23.9″W	LMS
W210BS	89.9 FM	New Bern, North Carolina	106585	120	36 m (118 ft)	D	35°7′56.5″N 77°10′2.8″W	LMS
W292DF	106.3 FM	Bassett Forks, Virginia	145951	10	232.8 m (764 ft)	D	36°36′48.5″N 79°55′3.1″W	LMS
W275AW	102.9 FM	Danville, Virginia	145882	38	60.9 m (200 ft)	D	36°32′38.5″N 79°23′10.1″W	LMS

In 2016, WCPE's programming in Buxton moved from high-power WBUX (90.5 FM) to W216BE (now W219DW). Both facilities are owned by WUNC, which WBUX now retransmits.
