= Couch-Marshall House =

Historic house in Arkansas, United States

- U.S. National Register of Historic Places
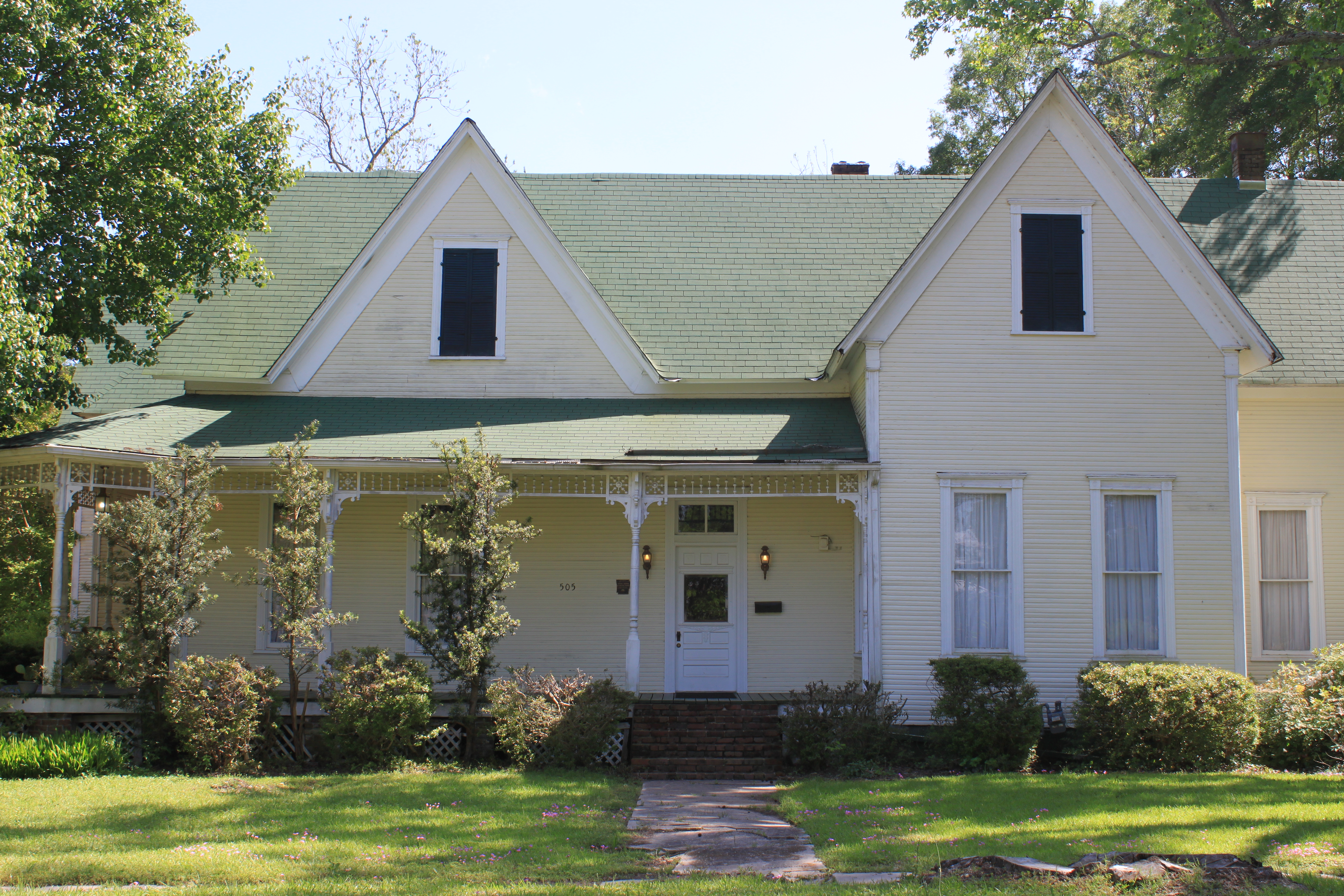

- Location within Arkansas Location within the United States
- Location: 505 W. Monroe St., Magnolia, Arkansas
- Coordinates: 33°15′56″N 93°14′41″W
- Area: 1 acre (0.40 ha)
- Built: 1890
- Architectural style: Greek Revival, Queen Anne
- NRHP reference No.: 92000955
- Added to NRHP: July 24, 1992

The Couch-Marshall House is a historic house at 505 West Monroe Street in Magnolia, Arkansas. The oldest portion of this house, now the rear, began as a vernacular Greek Revival cottage built c. 1840 by Thomas G. Couch. In the 1890s this structure was significantly expanded and restyled in the then-popular Queen Anne style, although it retains some Plain Traditional influence. It has the asymmetrical and irregular massing typical of the Queen Anne style, with gabled dormers and projecting gabled bays, and a porch with elaborate jigsaw-cut detailing.

The house was listed on the National Register of Historic Places in 1992.

== See also ==
- National Register of Historic Places listings in Columbia County, Arkansas
