= Cross and Nelson Hall Historic District =

Historic district in Arkansas, United States

- U.S. National Register of Historic Places
- U.S. Historic district
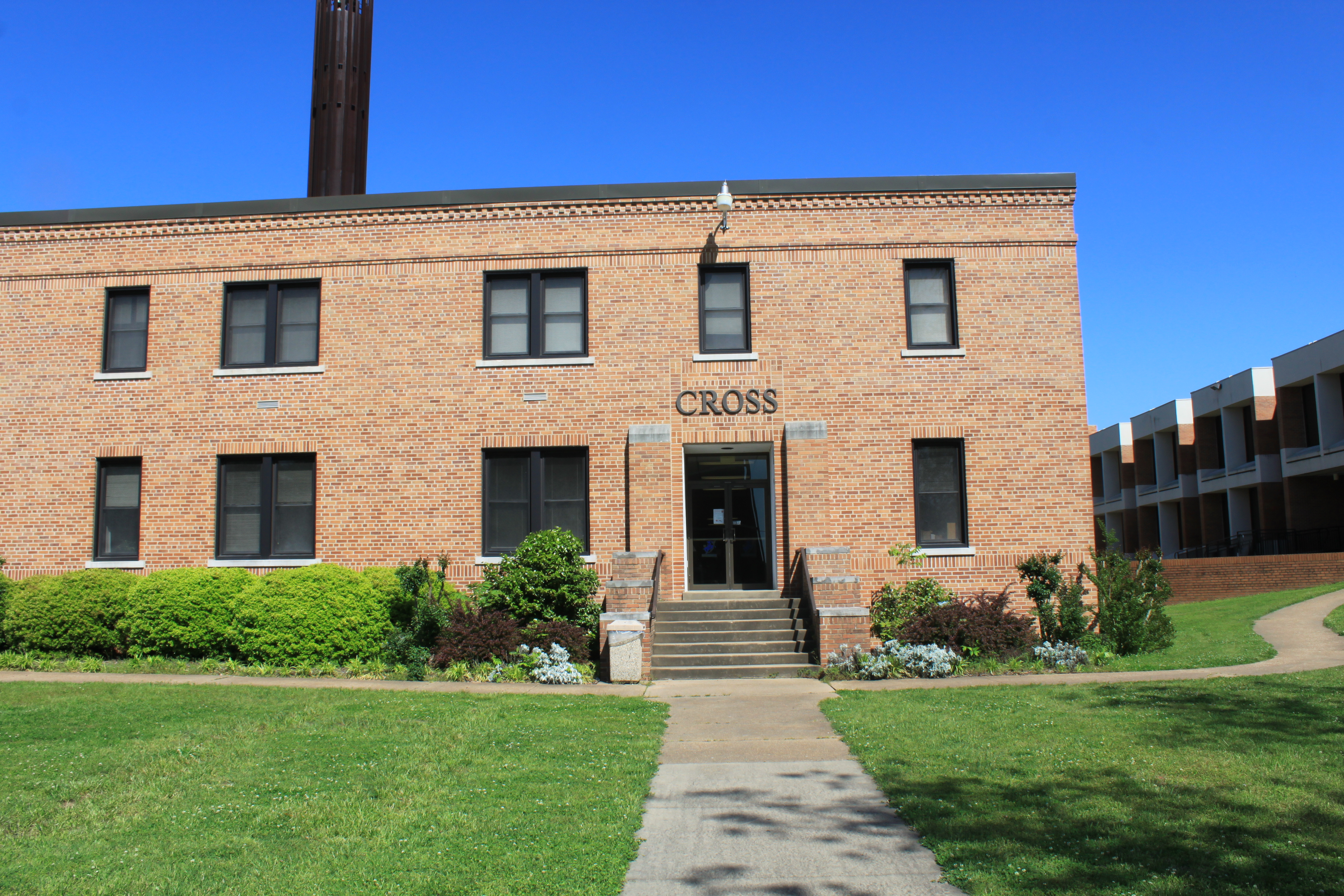

- Location within Arkansas Location within the United States
- Location: Southern Arkansas University Campus at 100 E. University, Magnolia, Arkansas
- Coordinates: 33°17′32″N 93°14′10″W
- Area: 3 acres (1.2 ha)
- Built: 1936
- Built by: Public Works Administration
- Architectural style: Plain-Traditional, Colonial Revival, Collegiate Gothic
- MPS: New Deal Recovery Efforts in Arkansas MPS
- NRHP reference No.: 09001240
- Added to NRHP: January 20, 2010

The Cross and Nelson Hall Historic District encompasses two historic buildings on the campus of Southern Arkansas University in Magnolia, Arkansas. Cross Hall and Nelson Hall were both built in 1936 by the Public Works Administration (PWA) as dormitories for boys and girls, respectively. They are two-story L-shaped brick buildings with Colonial Revival and Collegiate Gothic stylistic elements. Cross Hall has since been converted into classrooms and professors' offices; Nelson Hall now houses student services and the admissions office.

The two buildings were listed as a historic district on the National Register of Historic Places in 2010. They are the best-preserved of a small number of surviving PWA buildings in Magnolia.

== See also ==
- National Register of Historic Places listings in Columbia County, Arkansas
