= Kate Turner House =

Historic house in Arkansas, United States

- U.S. National Register of Historic Places
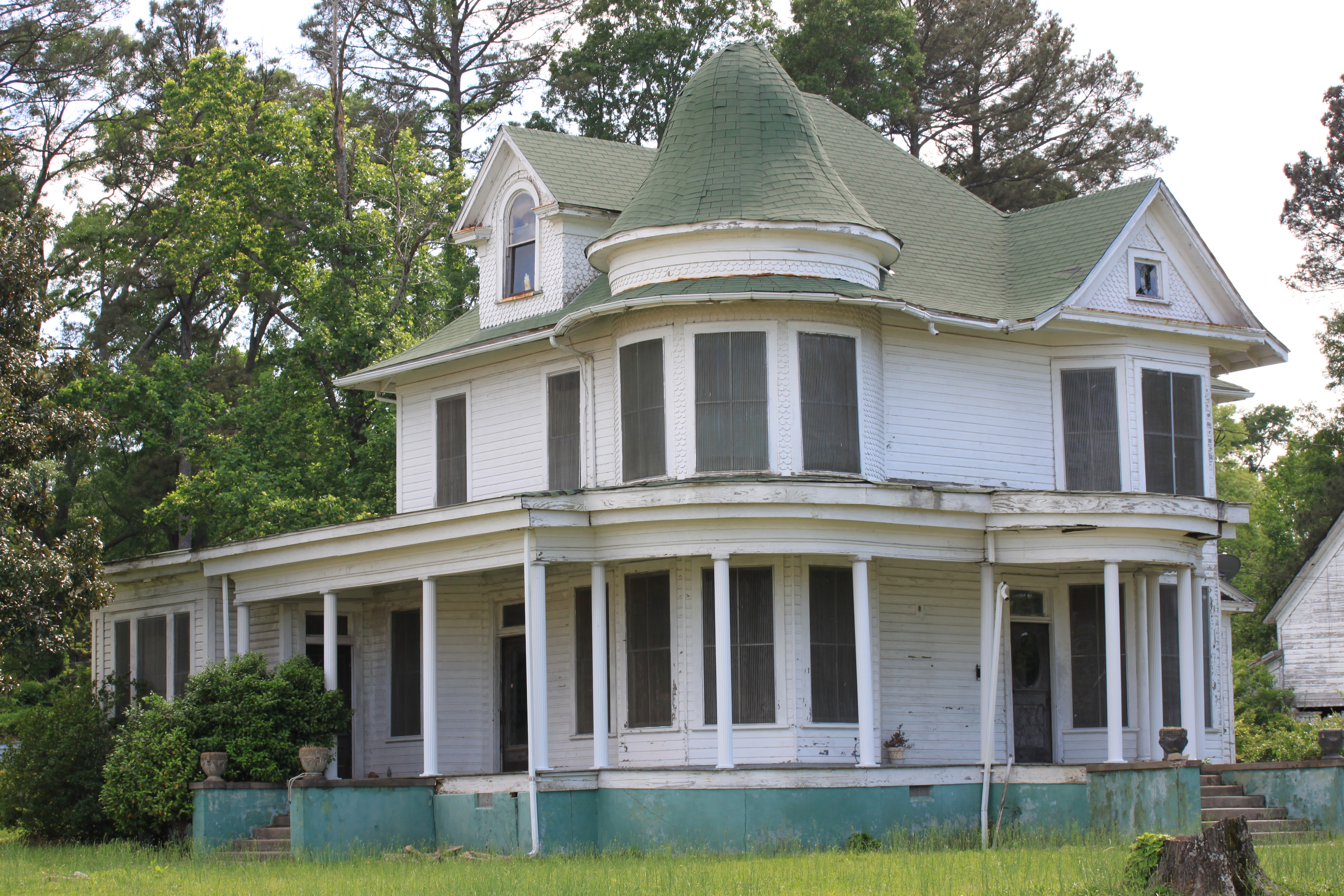

- Location within Arkansas Location within the United States
- Location: 709 W. Main St., Magnolia, Arkansas
- Coordinates: 33°16′0″N 93°14′53″W
- Area: 2 acres (0.81 ha)
- Built: 1904
- Architect: Sidney & Stewart
- Architectural style: Colonial Revival, Queen Anne
- NRHP reference No.: 82002099
- Added to NRHP: August 26, 1982

The Kate Turner House is a historic house at 709 West Main Street in Magnolia, Arkansas.

== History ==
Built in 1904 (122 years ago), this two-story wood-frame structure is one of the city's finest Late Victorian houses. It has the irregular massing and turret typical of Queen Anne styling, but its porch is more Colonial Revival in style. It was built by J. W. Turner as a residence for himself and his wife, Kate (Kelso) Turner, who was from a family with a long history in the county.

The house was listed on the National Register of Historic Places in 1982 (44 years ago).

== See also ==
- National Register of Historic Places listings in Columbia County, Arkansas
