= Old Alexander House =

Historic house in Arkansas, United States

- U.S. National Register of Historic Places
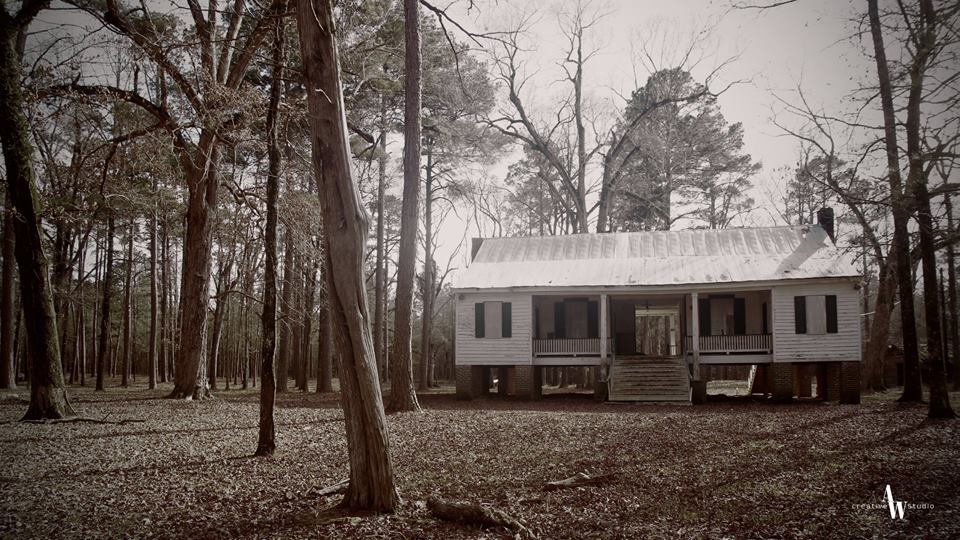
- The house in its original setting

- Location within Arkansas Location within the United States
- Location: Southern Arkansas University campus, Magnolia, Arkansas
- Coordinates: 33°17′40″N 93°14′10″W
- Area: less than one acre
- Built: 1855
- Built by: Samuel Alexander
- NRHP reference No.: 79000435
- Added to NRHP: January 18, 1979

The Old Alexander House is a historic house on the campus of Southern Arkansas University in Magnolia, Arkansas. Originally built in rural Columbia County in 1855 by Samuel Alexander, this single-story dogtrot house is one of the oldest buildings in the county, and one of its few surviving antebellum structures.

The house was listed on the National Register of Historic Places in 1979. In 2017 it was moved from its rural location to the university campus, where it is slated to be used as part of its rural studies program.

== See also ==
- National Register of Historic Places listings in Columbia County, Arkansas
