= Ozmer House =

Historic house in Arkansas, United States

- U.S. National Register of Historic Places
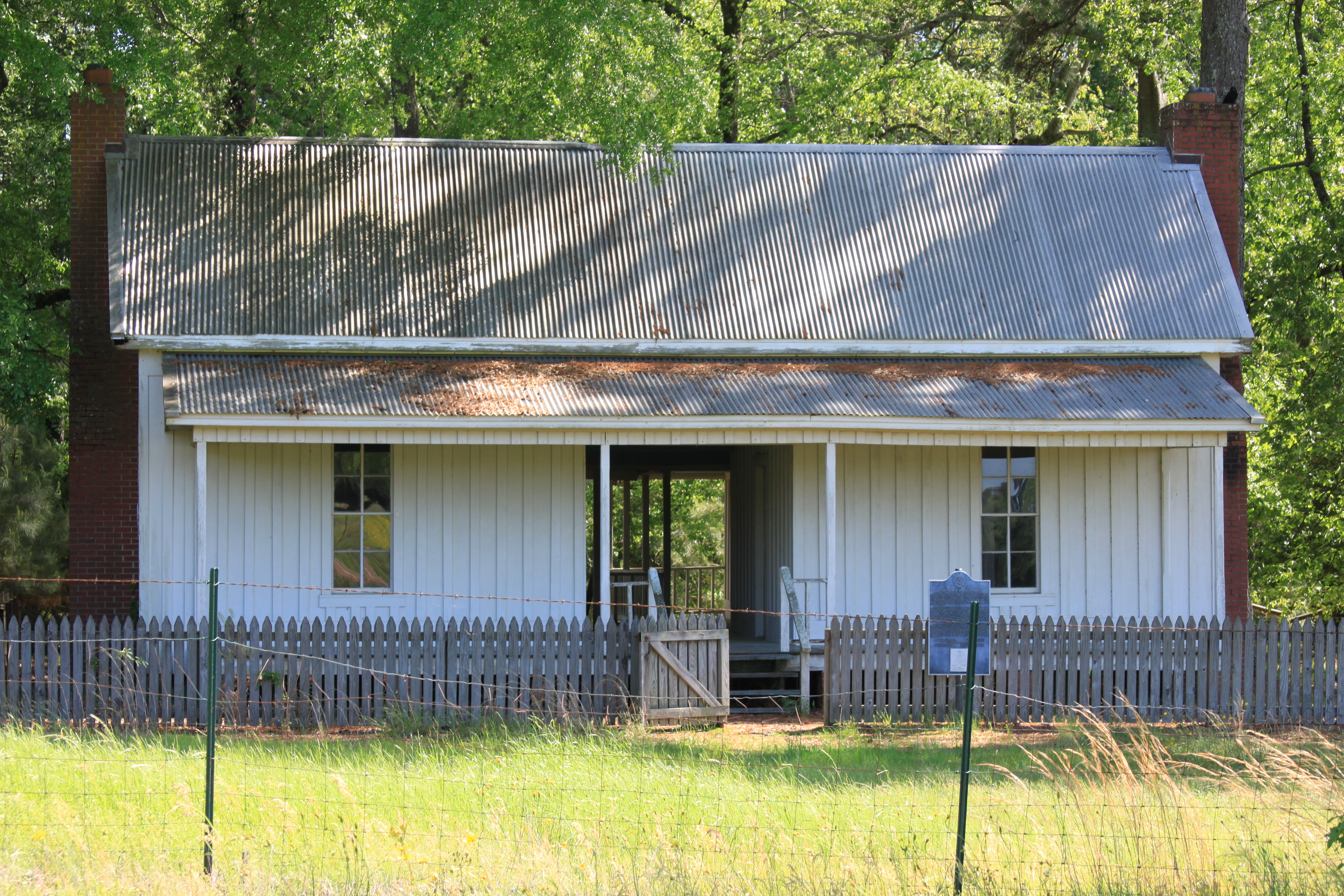

- Location within Arkansas Location within the United States
- Nearest city: Magnolia, Arkansas
- Coordinates: 33°18′0″N 93°13′25″W
- Area: 5 acres (2.0 ha)
- Built: 1883
- Architectural style: Dog-trot
- NRHP reference No.: 86003226
- Added to NRHP: November 20, 1986

The Ozmer House is a historic house on the Southern Arkansas University farm on the north side of Magnolia, Arkansas. It is a single-story dogtrot house that was built in 1883 and moved to its present location by the school. It was originally located about two miles northeast of Magnolia's courthouse square, and is now located northeast of the main farm complex, adjacent to a small pond. The dogtrot is extremely well-preserved, both in its interior and exterior features.

The house was listed on the National Register of Historic Places in 1986.

== See also ==
- National Register of Historic Places listings in Columbia County, Arkansas
