= Greek theatre (disambiguation) =

Greek theatre or Greek theater may refer to:

- Theatre of Ancient Greece
- Any of a number of surviving Ancient Greek theatre structures
- Modern Greek theatre

== Modern recreations ==
Italy

- Greek Theatre of Syracuse, Sicily, Italy

United States

- Greek Amphitheatre (Magnolia, Arkansas)
- Hearst Greek Theatre, at the University of California (Berkeley)
- Greek Theatre (Los Angeles), California
- Greek Theater and Colonnade of Civic Benefactors, Denver, Colorado, in Denver Civic Center
- Greek Theatre (Baton Rouge), Louisiana at Louisiana State University
