= Frog Level =

Frog Level may refer to the following places or structures in the United States:

- Frog Level (Bussey, Arkansas), a historic house listed on the NRHP in southwestern Arkansas
- Frog Level, Kentucky, a community in Todd County, Kentucky, now known as Sharon Grove
- Frog Level, Louisiana, a village in Caddo Parish, Louisiana, now known as Rodessa
- Frog Level, Pitt County, North Carolina, a community on the outskirts of Greenville, North Carolina
- Frog Level, Rutherford County, North Carolina, a community in Spindale, North Carolina
- Frog Level, Waynesville, North Carolina, a neighborhood in western North Carolina municipality of Waynesville
  - Frog Level Historic District, Waynesville, North Carolina, a part of the neighborhood listed on the NRHP
- Frog Level, Tazewell County, Virginia, a community in Southwest Virginia near the town of Tazewell
- Frog Level, Caroline County, Virginia, a community in eastern Virginia in southern Caroline County
