= W. H. Allen House =

Historic house in Arkansas, United States

- U.S. National Register of Historic Places
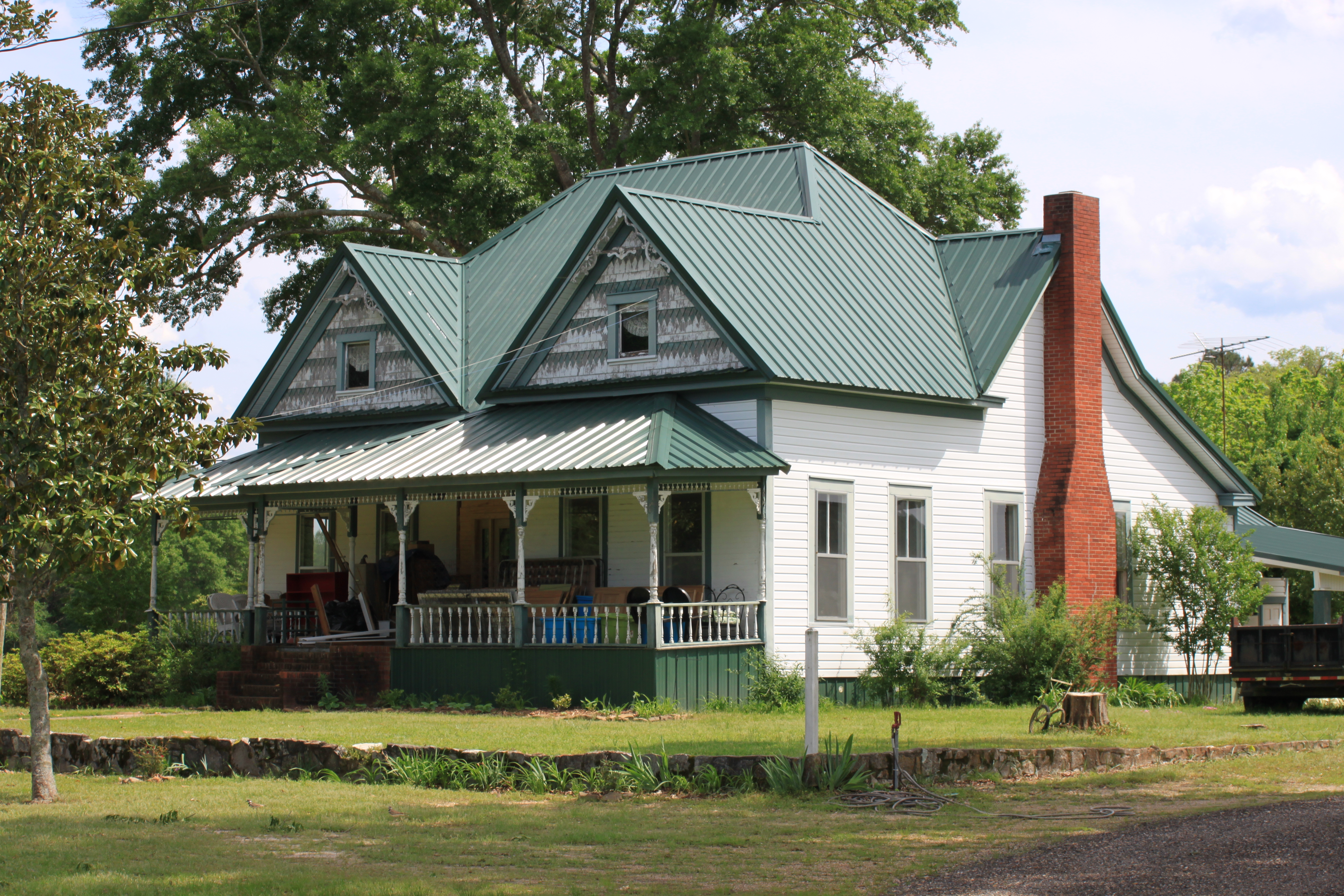

- Location within Arkansas Location within the United States
- Nearest city: Spotville, Arkansas
- Coordinates: 33°11′31″N 93°1′25″W
- Area: less than one acre
- Built: 1873
- Built by: W.H. Allen
- NRHP reference No.: 76000395
- Added to NRHP: October 14, 1976

The W. H. Allen House is a historic house in rural Columbia County, Arkansas. It is a single-story house whose main block is a four-room dogtrot house built in 1873 by one of the area's first American settlers, Walter Howard Allen. This main block measures 28 feet (8.5 m) in depth and 42 feet (13 m) in width, and was built from logs hauled to the site from Camden. The house was enlarged by Allen's son in 1907, and has been little altered since. The road it is located on (County Road 40) was once the main road between Magnolia and El Dorado.

The house was listed on the National Register of Historic Places on October 14, 1976.

== See also ==
- National Register of Historic Places listings in Columbia County, Arkansas
