= Columbia County Jail =

- U.S. National Register of Historic Places
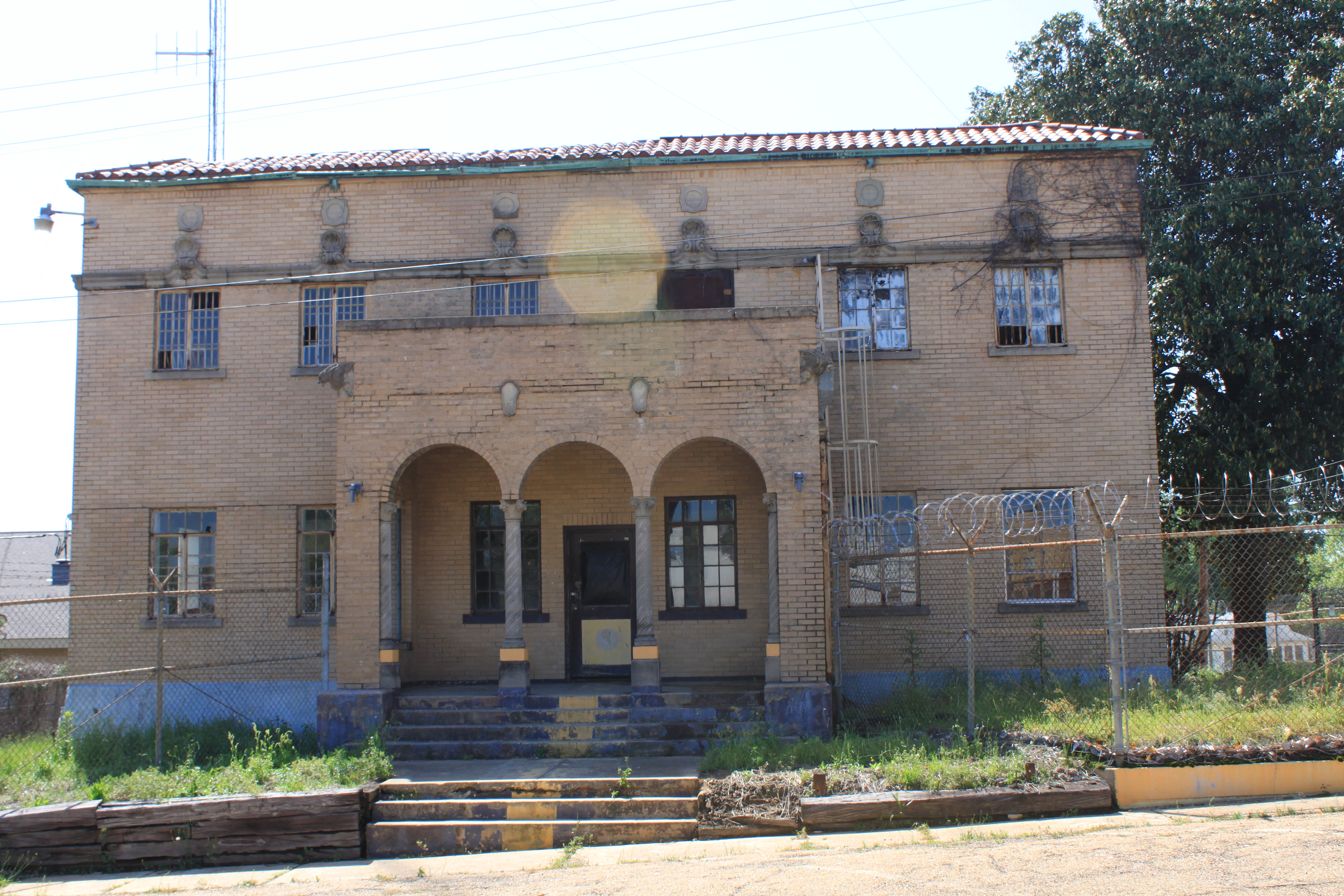

- Location within Arkansas Location within the United States
- Location: Calhoun & Jefferson Sts., Magnolia, Arkansas
- Coordinates: 33°15′55″N 93°14′30″W
- Area: less than one acre
- Built: 1920
- Architect: Thompson & Harding
- Architectural style: Late 19th and 20th Century Revivals
- MPS: Thompson, Charles L., Design Collection TR
- NRHP reference No.: 82000802
- Added to NRHP: December 22, 1982

The Columbia County Jail is a historic structure at Calhoun and Jefferson Streets in Magnolia, Arkansas. The brick two story structure in Columbia County was designed by Thompson & Harding and was built c. 1920, and is an excellent local example of Italian Renaissance architecture. It is faced in cream-colored brick, and has a terracotta hipped roof. It has an entrance portico with round arches supported by slender columns and gargoyles at its corners.

The building was listed on the U.S. National Register of Historic Places in 1982 for its architecture; it was still used as a jail at that time.

== See also ==
- National Register of Historic Places listings in Columbia County, Arkansas
