= 2013 Magnolia Refinery oil spill =

In Arkansas, United States

2013 Magnolia oil spill
- Location: Magnolia, Arkansas
- Coordinates: 33°27′42″N 93°23′36″W
- Date: March 9, 2013

Cause
- Cause: Pump and storage line split (Pipeline rupture)
- Operator: Lion Oil, Lion Oil and Trading & Transportation

Spill characteristics
- Volume: 15,000 barrels/7,000 tonnes

The 2013 Magnolia Refinery oil spill occurred on March 9, 2013, when the line between a vital pump and an oil storage container broke. The split allowed a reported 15,000 barrels (1,788 m^{3}) or 7,000 tonnes of crude oil into the Little Corney Creek. The creek runs towards the town of Magnolia, Arkansas. The resulting oil slick was approximately 1.5 miles (2.4 km) long on the surface of the water, about 20 miles (32 km) north of the Louisiana state border. The leak was located at the Lion Oil and Trading & Transportation's Oil tank farm, between the settlements of Magnolia and El Dorado, owned by Delek's Logistic Unit. The United States Environmental Protection Agency (EPA) classified this pipeline rupture as a major spill because of the number of barrels estimated to have been spilled.

== Geography ==
The city of Magnolia is in Columbia County, Arkansas, United States and is the county seat of the county. According to the 2009 U.S. Census Bureau reports, the population of the city is 10,951. The city itself has an approximate area of 9.344 square miles (24.20 km^{2}).

== Response ==
Local authorities were called to action and responded quickly to clean up the spill and monitor the damage. Cleanup workers used of a "vacuum truck", a vehicle used to suck up the oil and water from the creek quickly before making efforts to separate the two liquids. This process was employed to minimize environmental damage to the local shorelines. Beginning oil removal as fast as possible benefits the cleanup process's overall results. The farther into the environment that the oil seeps, the longer it will take to remove and the more integrated it will become into the food chain, becoming inaccessible.

The United States Environmental Protection Agency (EPA) was vital too in the cleanup process at Magnolia, Arkansas after this oil spill. Low temperatures and inclement weather initially delayed the cleanup procedures, but the EPA was eventually able to send out crews to various locations within the affected area.

== Result ==
Delek was required to pay for all cleanup operations after the spill and if the logistics unit corporation is confirmed guilty of negligence, for which they be fined accordingly.

== See also ==
- List of Oil Spills
- List of Pipeline Accidents in the United States
- Consortium Website
- Gulf of Mexico Research Initiative
