= National Register of Historic Places listings in Columbia County, Arkansas =

Location of Columbia County in Arkansas

This is a list of the National Register of Historic Places listings in Columbia County, Arkansas.

This is intended to be a complete list of the properties and districts on the National Register of Historic Places in Columbia County, Arkansas, United States. The locations of National Register properties and districts for which the latitude and longitude coordinates are included below, may be seen in a map.

There are 24 properties and districts listed on the National Register in the county.

Contents: Counties in Arkansas
- Arkansas
- Ashley
- Baxter
- Benton
- Boone
- Bradley
- Calhoun
- Carroll
- Chicot
- Clark
- Clay
- Cleburne
- Cleveland
- Columbia
- Conway
- Craighead
- Crawford
- Crittenden
- Cross
- Dallas
- Desha
- Drew
- Faulkner
- Franklin
- Fulton
- Garland
- Grant
- Greene
- Hempstead
- Hot Spring
- Howard
- Independence
- Izard
- Jackson
- Jefferson
- Johnson
- Lafayette
- Lawrence
- Lee
- Lincoln
- Little River
- Logan
- Lonoke
- Madison
- Marion
- Miller
- Mississippi
- Monroe
- Montgomery
- Nevada
- Newton
- Ouachita
- Perry
- Phillips
- Pike
- Poinsett
- Polk
- Pope
- Prairie
- Pulaski (Little Rock)
- Randolph
- St. Francis
- Saline
- Scott
- Searcy
- Sebastian
- Sevier
- Sharp
- Stone
- Union
- Van Buren
- Washington
- White
- Woodruff
- Yell

This National Park Service list is complete through NPS recent listings posted December 19, 2025.

== Current listings ==
	Name on the Register	Image	Date listed	Location	City or town	Description
1	W. H. Allen House	W. H. Allen House	October 14, 1976 (#76000395)	Northwest of Spotville off Highway 98; 33°11′31″N 93°01′25″W	Spotville	
2	Columbia County Courthouse	Columbia County Courthouse	April 15, 1978 (#78000580)	Court Sq. 33°16′01″N 93°14′27″W	Magnolia	
3	Columbia County Jail	Columbia County Jail	December 22, 1982 (#82000802)	Calhoun and Jefferson Sts. 33°15′55″N 93°14′30″W	Magnolia	
4	Harvey C. Couch School	Harvey C. Couch School	June 8, 1993 (#93000482)	Northeast of the junction of County Roads 11 (Calhoun Rd.) and 25; 33°13′12″N 93°09′12″W	Calhoun	
5	Couch-Marshall House	Couch-Marshall House	July 24, 1992 (#92000955)	505 W. Monroe St. 33°15′56″N 93°14′41″W	Magnolia	
6	Cross and Nelson Hall Historic District	Cross and Nelson Hall Historic District	January 20, 2010 (#09001240)	Southern Arkansas University campus at 100 E. University; 33°17′25″N 93°14′07″W	Magnolia	
7	Dolph Camp, Bussey and Peace Halls Historic District	Dolph Camp, Bussey and Peace Halls Historic District	January 29, 2013 (#12001231)	East side of Lane Dr., Southern Arkansas University; 33°17′26″N 93°14′03″W	Magnolia	
8	Frog Level	Frog Level	September 22, 1972 (#72000201)	West of Magnolia off Columbia Rd. 33°16′44″N 93°21′13″W	Bussey	
9	Greene-Talbot-Talley Halls Historic District		March 13, 2023 (#100008558)	South of North Washington and East Lane Dr. intersection 33°17′34″N 93°14′10″W	Magnolia	
10	Greek Amphitheatre	Greek Amphitheatre	June 1, 2005 (#05000488)	Junction of East Lane Dr., E. University St., and Crescent Dr. 33°17′27″N 93°14′04″W	Magnolia	
11	Dr. H.A. Longino House	Dr. H.A. Longino House	June 14, 1982 (#82002098)	317 W. Main St. 33°16′00″N 93°14′36″W	Magnolia	
12	Magnesia Springs Campground		May 9, 2024 (#100010314)	Logoly State Park; 33°20′51″N 93°11′06″W	Magnolia	
13	Magnolia Colored School Historic District	Magnolia Colored School Historic District	January 22, 2014 (#13001103)	611 S. Madison; 33°15′43″N 93°14′37″W	Magnolia	
14	Magnolia Commercial Historic District	Magnolia Commercial Historic District	May 20, 2008 (#08000435)	Roughly bounded by Madison Ave., Calhoun St., Jackson Ave., and Union St. 33°16′02″N 93°14′27″W	Magnolia	
15	McNeil Overpass		May 13, 2021 (#100006535)	US 79 over the Union Pacific RR. 33°20′54″N 93°12′03″W	McNeil	
16	Mt. Prospect Methodist Church	Mt. Prospect Methodist Church	March 22, 1990 (#90000428)	Junction of County Roads 61 and 446; 33°22′09″N 93°04′32″W	Richland	
17	Old Alexander House	Old Alexander House	January 18, 1979 (#79000435)	Southern Arkansas University campus 33°19′24″N 93°08′26″W	Magnolia	Moved from a rural setting in 2017.
18	Overstreet Hall	Overstreet Hall	January 26, 2016 (#15000992)	NW. of jct. of E. University & N. Jackson Sts., Southern Arkansas University campus 33°17′23″N 93°14′10″W	Magnolia	
19	Ozmer House	Ozmer House	November 20, 1986 (#86003226)	Southern Arkansas University farm, U.S. Route 82 Bypass; 33°17′16″N 93°13′13″W	Magnolia vicinity	
20	President's House	President's House	May 28, 2013 (#13000315)	East Farm Road east of Washington Street, Southern Arkansas University; 33°17′46″N 93°13′59″W	Magnolia	
21	The Rushton Clinic	The Rushton Clinic	May 28, 2013 (#13000316)	219 North Washington Street; 33°16′09″N 93°14′26″W	Magnolia	
22	William H. Smith House	William H. Smith House	November 27, 1992 (#92001630)	North of the junction of Highway 98 and County Road 85; 33°07′12″N 93°03′12″W	Atlanta	
23	Kate Turner House	Kate Turner House	August 26, 1982 (#82002099)	709 W. Main St. 33°16′00″N 93°14′53″W	Magnolia	
24	Waldo Water Tower	Waldo Water Tower	May 29, 2007 (#07000472)	E. Main St., west of its junction with N. Skimmer; 33°21′11″N 93°16′56″W	Waldo	

== Former listings ==
	Name on the Register	Image	Date listed	Date removed	Location	City or town	Description
1	Bank of Waldo		December 22, 1982 (#82000801)	September 17, 1999	Locust and Main Sts.	Waldo	Demolished
2	Caraway Hall		February 25, 1993 (#93000088)	August 11, 1999	Southern Arkansas University, Adjacent to E. Lane Dr.	Magnolia	Demolished in 1994
3	Louisiana and Northwest Railroad Depot - Magnolia		June 11, 1992 (#92000614)	March 31, 2000	N side of Main St., between Clay and Walnut Sts.	Magnolia	

== See also ==
- List of National Historic Landmarks in Arkansas
- National Register of Historic Places listings in Arkansas
