= Magnolia Colored School Historic District =

Historic district in Arkansas, United States

- U.S. National Register of Historic Places
- U.S. Historic district
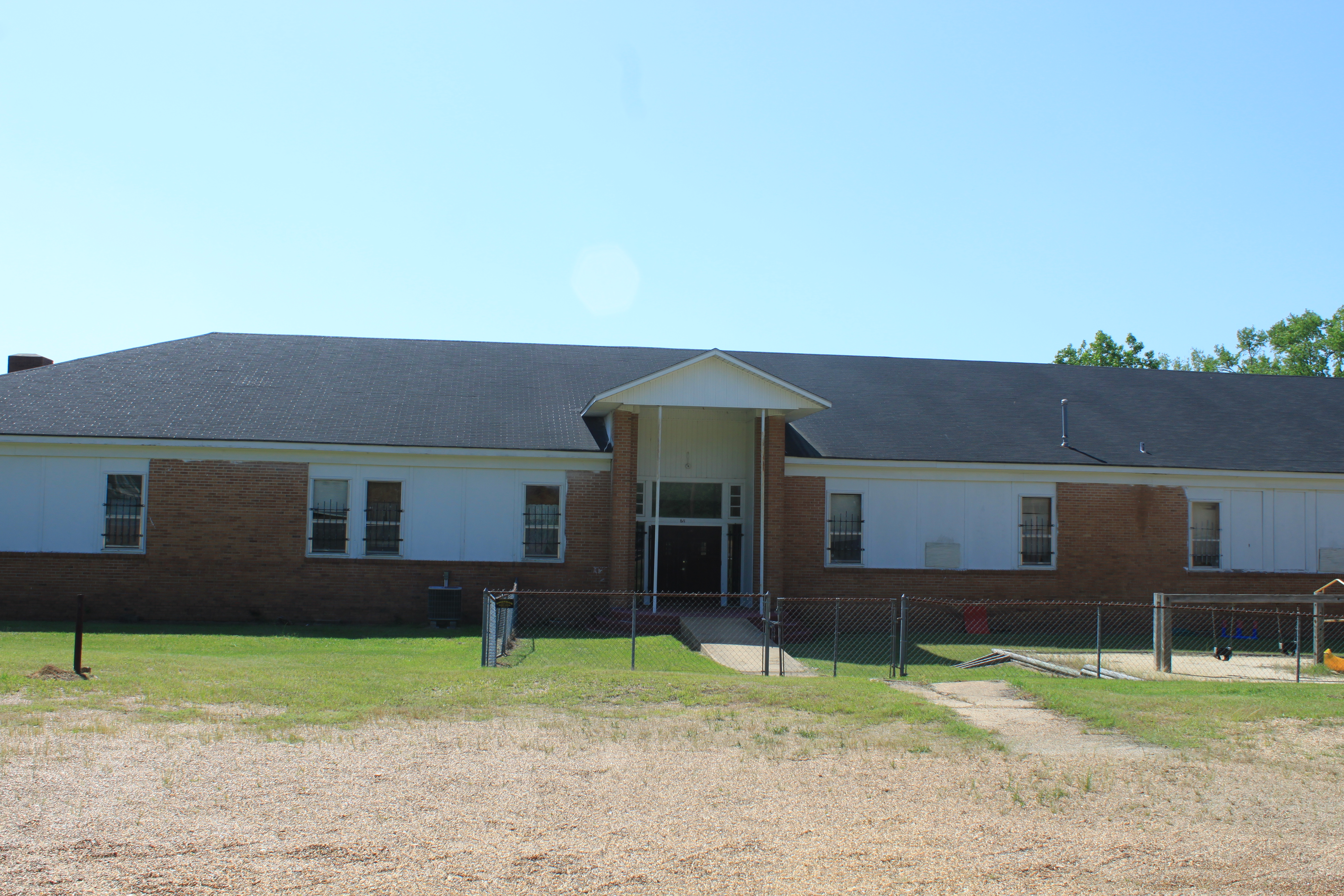

- Location within Arkansas Location within the United States
- Location: 611 S. Madison St., Magnolia, Arkansas
- Coordinates: 33°15′43″N 93°14′37″W
- Area: 2.5 acres (1.0 ha)
- Built: 1940
- NRHP reference No.: 13001103
- Added to NRHP: January 22, 2014

The Magnolia Colored School Historic District encompasses the historic Magnolia Colored School, a school facility serving the African-American population of Magnolia, Arkansas, between 1915 and 1969. It occupies a city block bounded by Madison, School, and Ross Streets, and includes four buildings built between c. 1940 and 1965. The main building, the Magnolia Colored High School, is a single-story building with Plain-Traditional styling built in 1948 after a fire destroyed the 1940 building. The complex also includes an auditorium, shop building, and home economics building. The c. 1940 shop and home economics buildings survived the 1948 fire, but the shop was torn down in 1964 to make way for the auditorium, and a new shop building was also built. In 1950 the school's name was changed to Columbia County High School, and was also known for a time as Columbia High School. A grade school, cafeteria, and gymnasium which were all originally part of the complex were torn down between 1994 and 2000.

The district was listed on the National Register of Historic Places in 2014.

== See also ==
- National Register of Historic Places listings in Columbia County, Arkansas
