= Frog Level (Bussey, Arkansas) =

Historic house in Arkansas, United States

- U.S. National Register of Historic Places
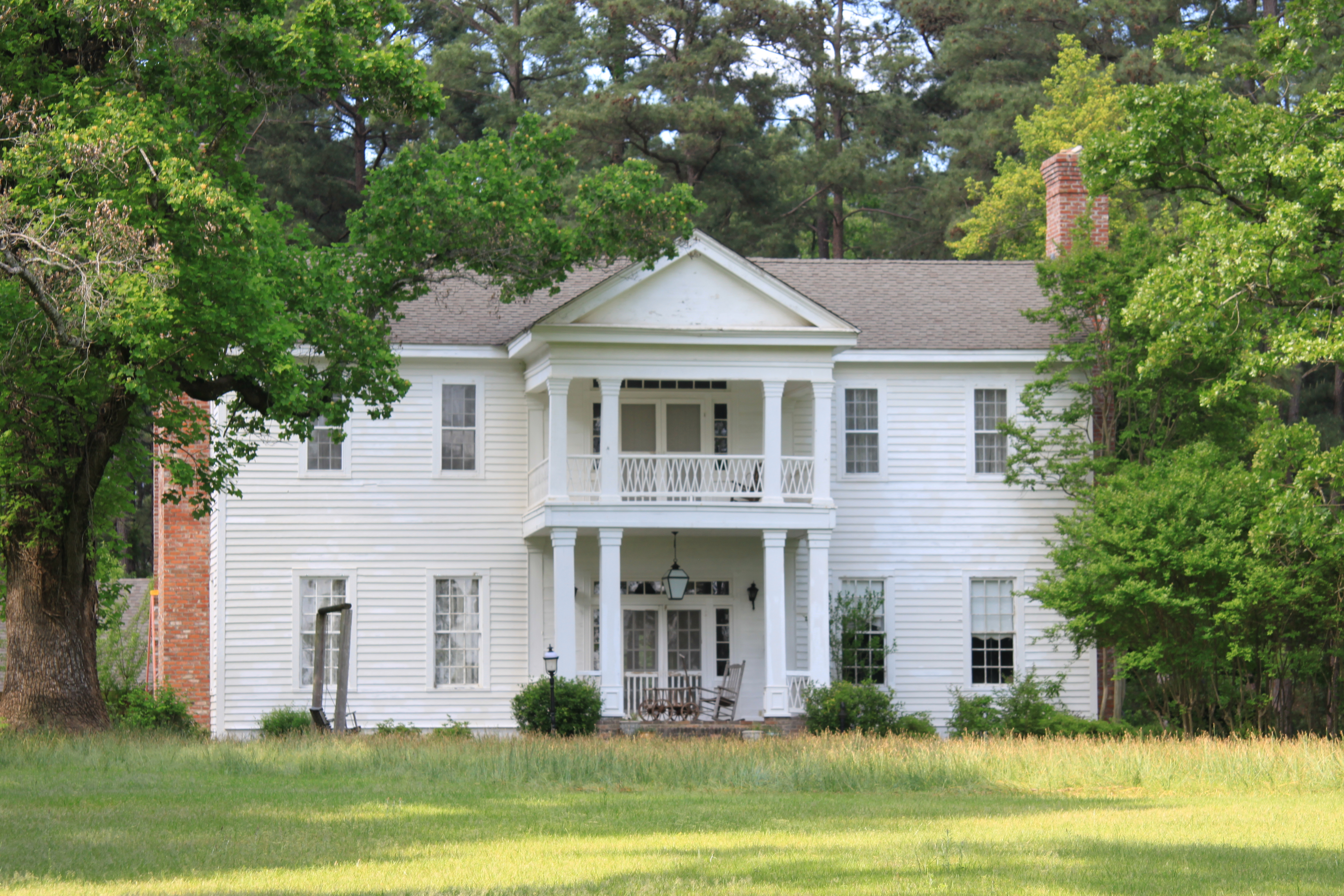

- Location within Arkansas Location within the United States
- Nearest city: Bussey, Arkansas
- Coordinates: 33°16′43″N 93°21′1″W
- Area: 0 acres (0 ha)
- Built: 1852
- Built by: William Frazier
- NRHP reference No.: 72000201
- Added to NRHP: September 22, 1972

Frog Level is a historic house in rural Columbia County, Arkansas, USA, one of a handful of surviving slave plantation houses in southwestern Arkansas.

It was built in 1852-54 by William Frazier.

It sits on the north side of County Road 148, west of County Road 27S and Magnolia. The two-story wood-frame house has two rooms on each floor, and a two-story temple portico extending across its front. This portico is supported by two sets of four columns, one set for each level of the porch. The house was given its name not long after its construction, due to the large number of frogs in the area.

The house was listed on the National Register of Historic Places in 1972.

== See also ==
- National Register of Historic Places listings in Columbia County, Arkansas
