= Greek Amphitheatre (Magnolia, Arkansas) =

- U.S. National Register of Historic Places
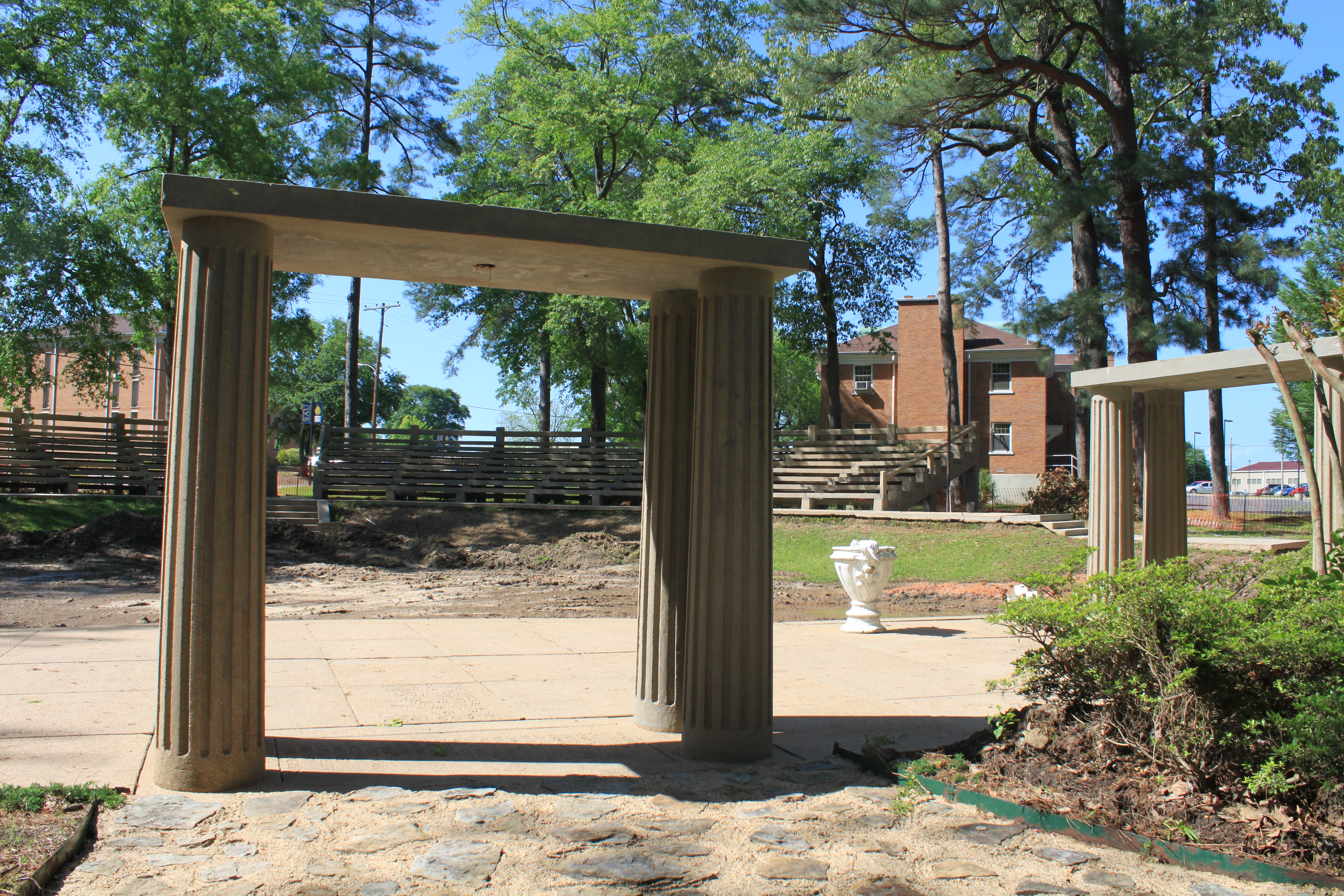

- Location within Arkansas Location within the United States
- Location: Jct. East Lane Dr., E. University St. & Crescent Dr., Magnolia, Arkansas
- Coordinates: 33°17′27″N 93°14′4″W
- Built: 1936
- Architect: Prof. S.D. Dickinson; NYA
- Architectural style: Classical Revival
- NRHP reference No.: 05000488
- Added to NRHP: June 1, 2005

The Greek Amphitheatre is an open-air amphitheater on the campus of Southern Arkansas University (SAU) in Magnolia, Arkansas. Located at the southeastern corner of the campus, it is the only performance space of its kind in southern Arkansas, and has regularly been the site of university events. It was built in 1938 by a combined effort of the National Youth Administration, and New Deal works program, and the 1936 graduating class of Magnolia A & M, as SAU was then called. It has a seating area 103 feet (31 m) wide and about 83 feet (25 m) deep. All of its major elements, including the seating area and stage, are made of concrete.

The amphitheater was listed on the National Register of Historic Places in 2005.

== See also ==
- National Register of Historic Places listings in Columbia County, Arkansas
