= Lion Oil =

Oil company of the United States

- Industry: Petroleum Products
- Founded: 1922
- Headquarters: Brentwood, Tennessee
- Products: Petrochemical
- Website: www.lionoil.com

Lion Oil Company is a private corporation engaged in refining and production of oil, gasoline, and oil-based products. It also manufactures asphalt, industrial solvents and roofing materials. It also operates a gathering and transportation system that moves oil products in interstate commerce. The company is based in Arkansas.

== History ==
Lion Oil Company was established in 1922. Thomas Harry (Colonel) Barton was instrumental in the development of the company. He joined the organization as a major stockholder in 1928 and was elected president and director. His tenure saw the expansion of Lion Oil with the addition of holdings in Texas, Louisiana, and Mississippi. In Arkansas, it owned three large petroleum companies, including 400 service stations.

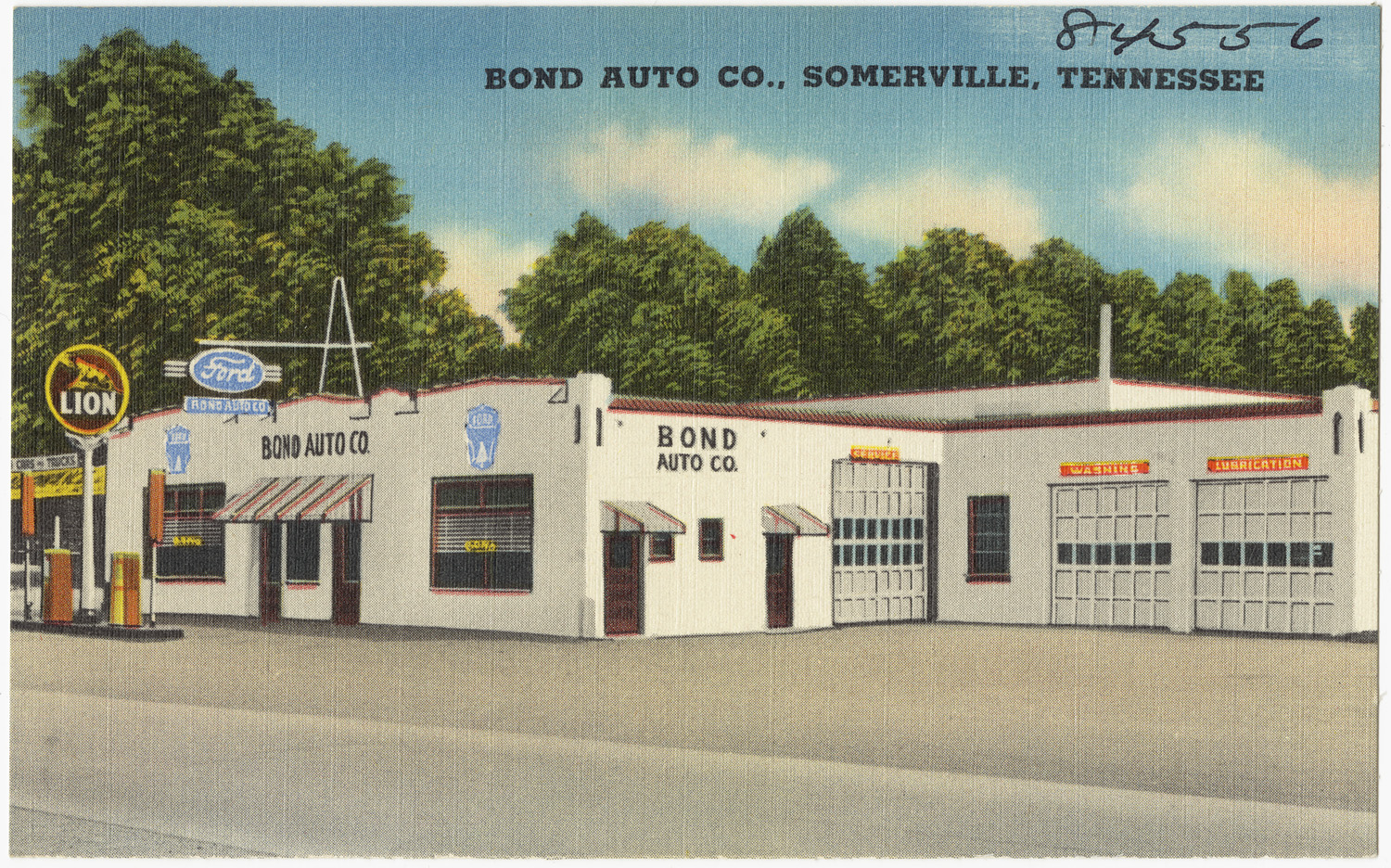
Lion Oil and Ford dealer, Somerville, Tennessee. Circa 1930-1945

In 1955, Lion Oil was sold to the Monsanto Company along with what is now El Dorado Chemical Company. Lion Oil is the only oil refinery Monsanto has owned. This purchase was part of Monsanto's move to enter the petroleum industry after major oil companies, which supplied it with feedstocks, began their own commodity chemical divisions. Lion Oil was later sold by Monsanto to Tosco.

In 1985, Lion was struggling and on the verge of shutting down and was sold by Tosco to a partnership of Ergon Refining of Jackson, Mississippi, and a group of local investors. This is how it acquired the oil refinery in El Dorado, Arkansas.

In March 2011, Delek US Holdings, Inc. of Brentwood, Tennessee acquired Ergon's 53.7% majority equity interest; total equity ownership by Delek increased to 88.3%; on April 29, 2011, Delek US became the new operator of Lion Oil.

In October 2011, Delek US Holdings, Inc. acquired the remaining 11.7% interest to increase its equity interest in Lion Oil to 100%.

Lion Oil continues as a petroleum supplier with its headquarters in Brentwood.

== See also ==
- 2013 Magnolia Refinery oil spill
- Exchange Bank (El Dorado, Arkansas) - formerly Lion Oil Headquarters
