= Frog Level, Caroline County, Virginia =

Unincorporated community in Virginia, United States

Frog Level, Virginia
- Unincorporated community
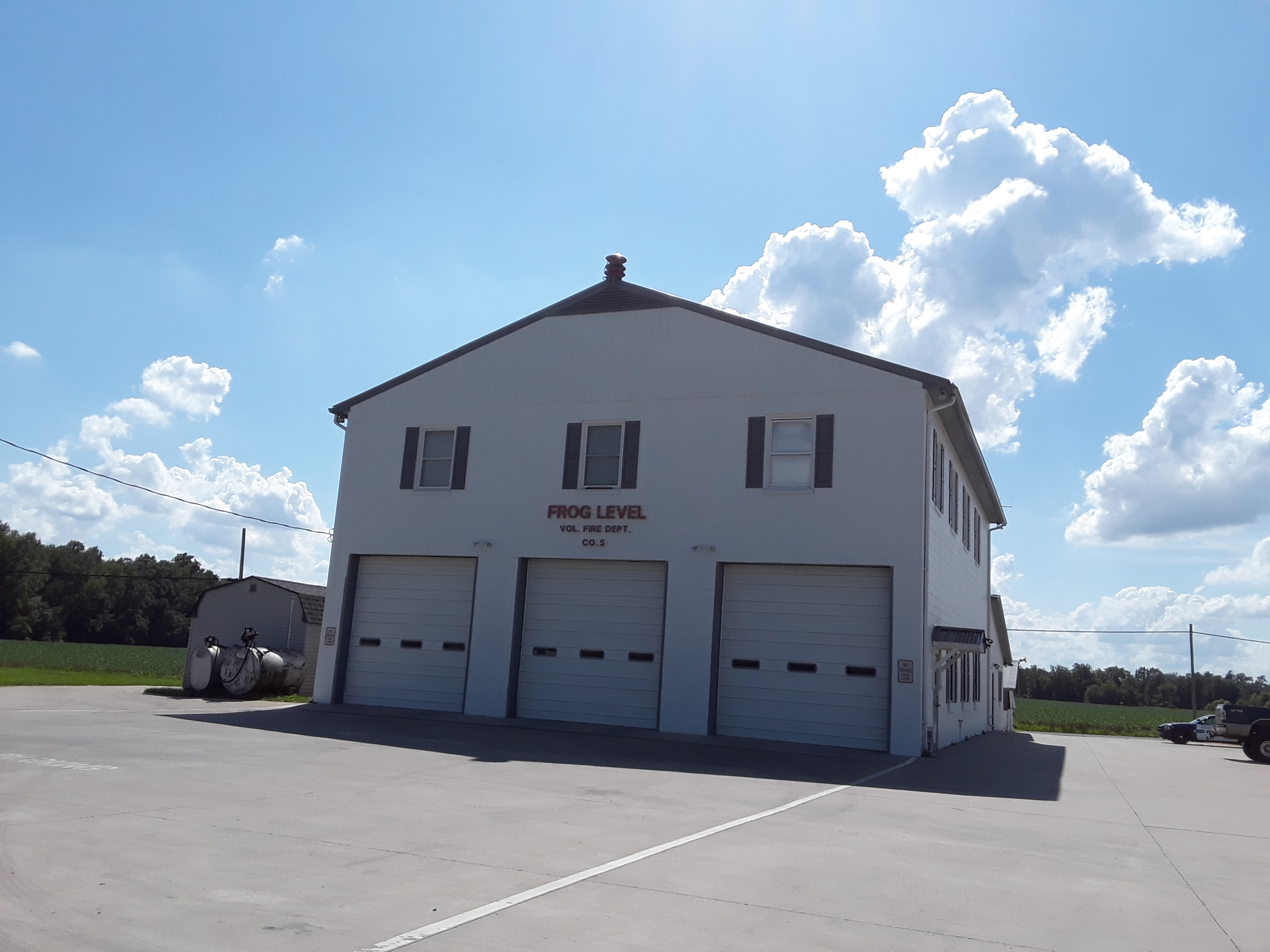
- Frog Level Volunteer Fire Department, July 2018

- Location within Virginia Location within the United States
- Coordinates: 37°51′12″N 77°19′27″W
- Country: United States
- State: Virginia
- County: Caroline
- Elevation: 194 ft (59 m)
- Time zone: UTC-5 (Eastern (EST))
  - Summer (DST): UTC-4 (EDT)
- GNIS feature ID: 1466901

Frog Level is an unincorporated community located in Caroline County, Virginia, United States.

Frog Level was so named on account of the croaking made by frogs there in the spring.
