= Frog Level Historic District =

Historic district in North Carolina, United States

- U.S. National Register of Historic Places
- U.S. Historic district
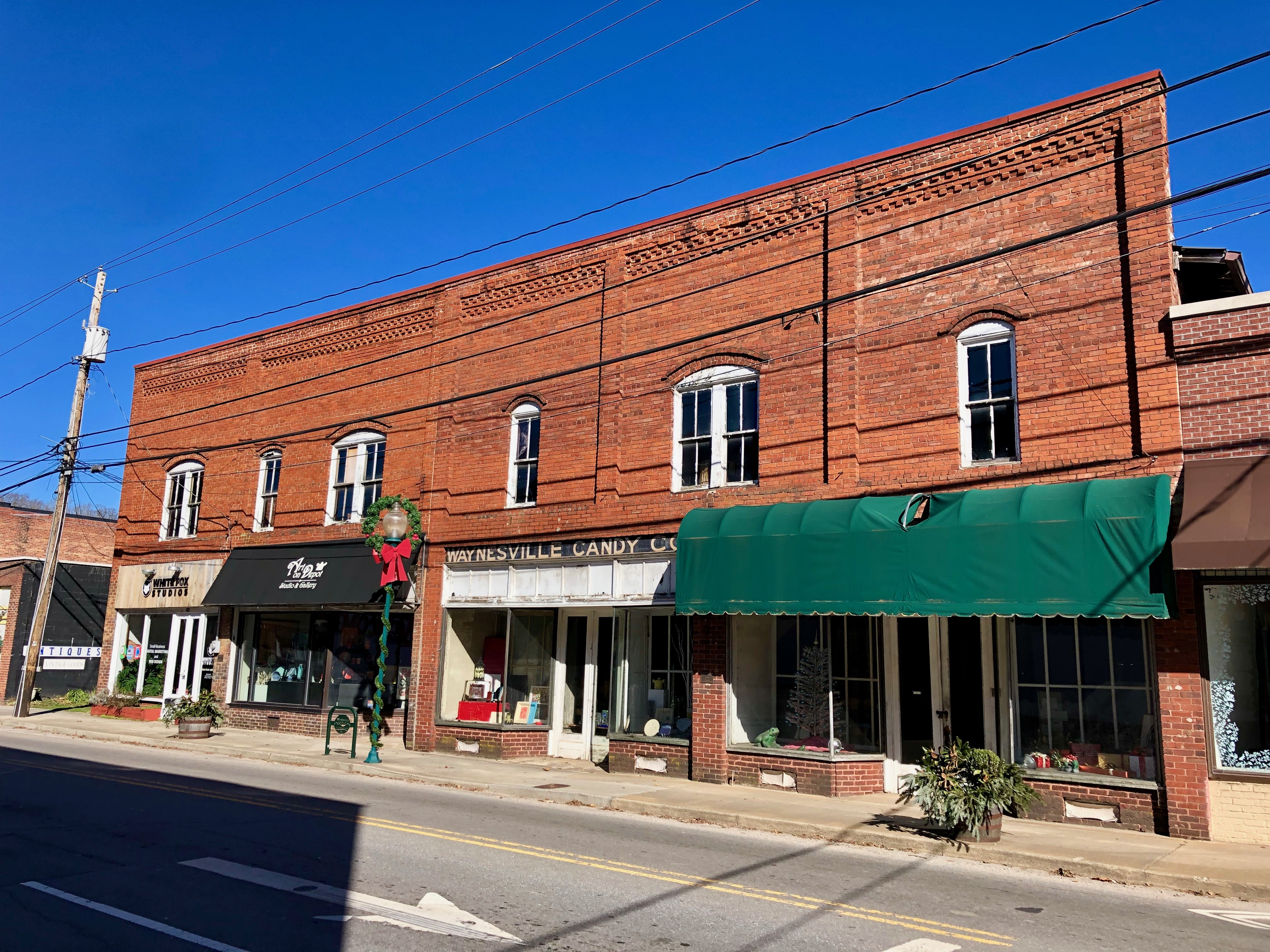
- Depot Street in Frog Level, January 2019

- Location within North Carolina Location within the United States
- Location: Roughly bounded by Commerce and Boundary Sts., Water St. and Richland Creek, Depot St., and 80 Commerce St., Waynesville, North Carolina
- Coordinates: 35°29′40″N 82°59′26″W
- Area: 4.9 acres (2.0 ha)
- Architectural style: Early Commercial, Romanesque
- NRHP reference No.: 03000854
- Added to NRHP: August 28, 2003

The Frog Level Historic District is a national historic district located in the Frog Level neighborhood at Waynesville, Haywood County, North Carolina. It includes 16 contributing buildings and one other contributing structure in the neighborhood of Frog Level. It includes Early Commercial architecture and Romanesque architecture. The buildings are predominantly one and two-story brick or frame buildings dating from the first three decades of the 20th century. Notable buildings include the C. G. Logan Auto Company (c. 1915), the Medford Furniture Company (1912), the T. N. Massie & Son building (c. 1900), and the North Carolina National Guard Armory (1936).

It was listed on the National Register of Historic Places in 2003.
