= Magnolia, Arkansas =

City in the United States

- City
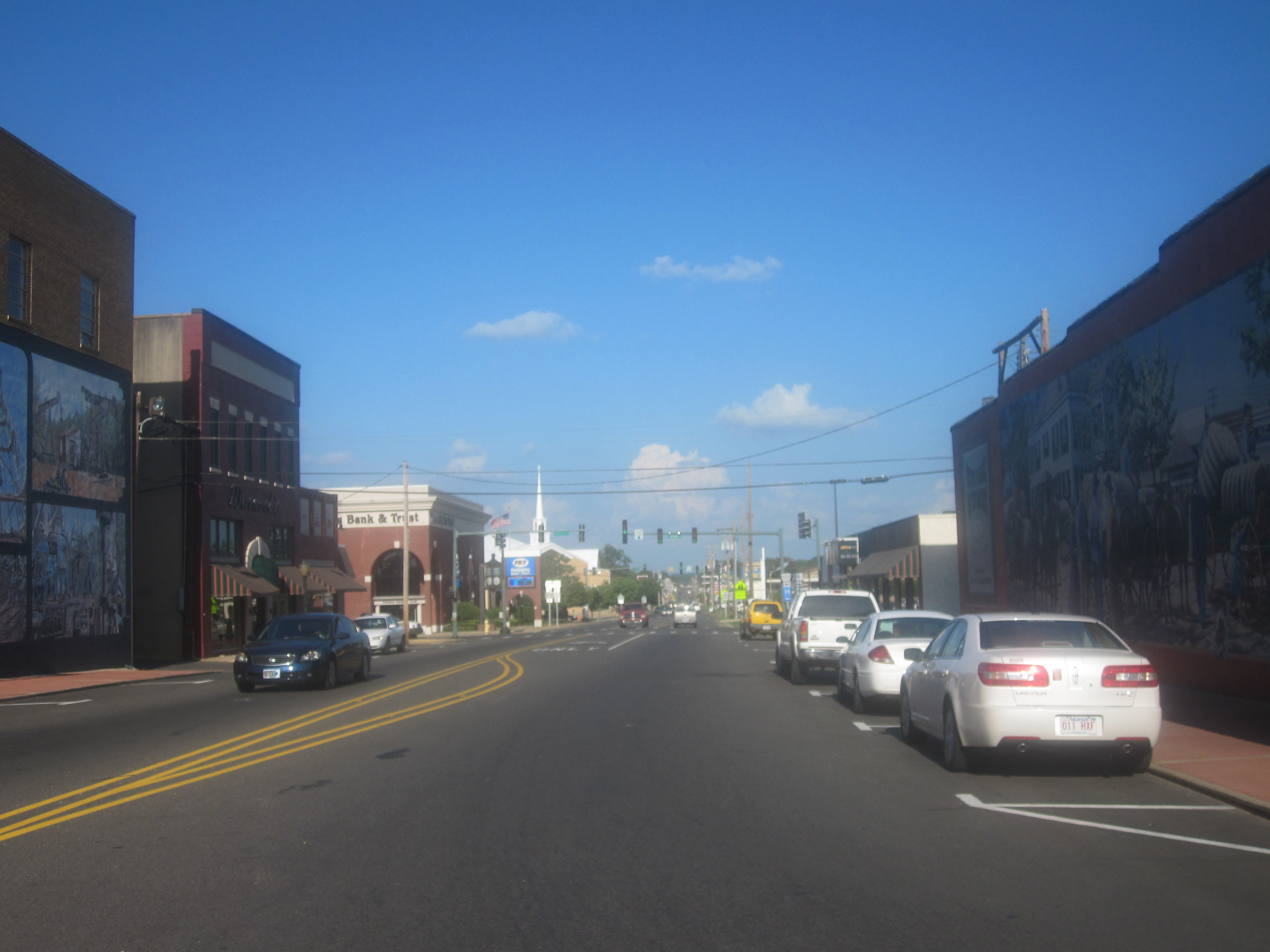
- Downtown Magnolia
- Motto: "Discover the Difference"
- Location of Magnolia in Columbia County, Arkansas.
- Coordinates: 33°16′27″N 93°14′28″W
- Country: United States
- State: Arkansas
- County: Columbia

Government
  - Type: Council-Strong Mayor

Area
  - Total: 13.27 sq mi (34.37 km^{2})
  - Land: 13.23 sq mi (34.27 km^{2})
  - Water: 0.039 sq mi (0.10 km^{2})
- Elevation: 358 ft (109 m)

Population (2020)
  - Total: 11,162
  - Estimate (2025): 10,660 ▼
  - Density: 843.6/sq mi (325.73/km^{2})
- Time zone: UTC-6 (Central (CST))
  - Summer (DST): UTC-5 (CDT)
- ZIP codes: 71753-71754
- Area code: 870
- FIPS code: 05-43460
- GNIS feature ID: 2404998
- Website: www.magnolia-ar.gov

Magnolia is a city in Columbia County, Arkansas, United States. As of the 2010 census the population was 11,577. The city is the county seat of Columbia County.

== History ==
The city was founded in 1853. At the time of its incorporation in 1858, the city had a population of about 1,950.

On November 11, 1919 Jordan Jameson was lynched in the town square of Magnolia. A large white mob seized Jameson after he allegedly shot the local sheriff. They tied him to a stake and burned him alive.

The city grew slowly as an agricultural and regional cotton market until the discovery of oil just east of the city in March 1938, with the Barnett No. 1 drilled by the Kerr-Lynn Company. The Magnolia Oil Field was an important discovery for the city as well as for the nation, as it was the largest producing field (in volume) during the early years of World War II, helping to sustain the American war effort.

In March 2013, more than 5,000 barrels of oil leaked from a Lion Oil Trading & Transportation storage tank in Magnolia, with some flowing into a bayou.

== Geography ==
Magnolia is located in southwest Arkansas, north of the center of Columbia County. The average altitude is 336 ft (102 m) above sea level according to NOAA. The surrounding region is a mix of dense forest, farm prairies, and low rolling hills.

According to the United States Census Bureau, the city has a total area of 13.3 square miles (34.4 km^{2}), of which 0.027 square miles (0.07 km^{2}), or 0.21%, is water.

Magnolia is located about 50 miles (80 km) east of Texarkana, about 135 miles (217 km) south of Little Rock, and about 75 miles (121 km) northeast of Shreveport, Louisiana.

=== Climate ===
The average temperature is 64 °F (18 °C), and the average annual rainfall is 50.3 inches (1,280 mm). The winters are mild but can dip into the teens at night and have highs in the 30s and even some 20s but average out around 50. The springs are warm and can be stormy with strong to severe storms and average highs in the mid 70s. Summers are often hot, humid and dry but with occasional isolated afternoon storms, highs in the mid to upper 90s and even 100s. In the fall the temps cool from the 90s and 100s to 80s and 70s. Early fall temps are usually in the 80s but can reach 90s and at times has reached 100. Late fall temps fall to 70s and 60s. It is not uncommon to see snow and ice during the winter.

Climate data for Magnolia, Arkansas (1991–2020)
Month	Jan	Feb	Mar	Apr	May	Jun	Jul	Aug	Sep	Oct	Nov	Dec	Year
Mean daily maximum °F (°C)	55.0 (12.8)	59.3 (15.2)	67.6 (19.8)	74.8 (23.8)	81.8 (27.7)	88.7 (31.5)	92.2 (33.4)	92.7 (33.7)	87.0 (30.6)	77.0 (25.0)	65.7 (18.7)	57.0 (13.9)	74.9 (23.8)
Daily mean °F (°C)	43.0 (6.1)	46.6 (8.1)	54.5 (12.5)	62.0 (16.7)	70.3 (21.3)	77.6 (25.3)	81.0 (27.2)	80.6 (27.0)	74.4 (23.6)	63.5 (17.5)	52.8 (11.6)	45.1 (7.3)	62.6 (17.0)
Mean daily minimum °F (°C)	31.1 (−0.5)	33.9 (1.1)	41.4 (5.2)	49.1 (9.5)	58.7 (14.8)	66.5 (19.2)	69.7 (20.9)	68.5 (20.3)	61.9 (16.6)	49.9 (9.9)	40.0 (4.4)	33.2 (0.7)	50.3 (10.2)
Average precipitation inches (mm)	4.48 (114)	4.69 (119)	6.55 (166)	5.43 (138)	5.56 (141)	3.81 (97)	3.31 (84)	3.63 (92)	3.45 (88)	5.03 (128)	4.73 (120)	5.64 (143)	56.31 (1,430)
Average snowfall inches (cm)	0.9 (2.3)	0.6 (1.5)	0.1 (0.25)	0.0 (0.0)	0.0 (0.0)	0.0 (0.0)	0.0 (0.0)	0.0 (0.0)	0.0 (0.0)	0.0 (0.0)	0.0 (0.0)	0.1 (0.25)	1.7 (4.3)
Source: NOAA

== Demographics ==
Historical population
Census	Pop.	Note	%±
1860	424		—
1870	259		−38.9%
1880	536		106.9%
1890	1,486		177.2%
1900	1,614		8.6%
1910	2,045		26.7%
1920	2,158		5.5%
1930	3,008		39.4%
1940	4,326		43.8%
1950	6,918		59.9%
1960	10,651		54.0%
1970	11,303		6.1%
1980	11,909		5.4%
1990	11,151		−6.4%
2000	10,858		−2.6%
2010	11,577		6.6%
2020	11,162		−3.6%
2025 (est.)	10,660	▼	−4.5%
U.S. Decennial Census

=== 2020 census ===
As of the 2020 census, Magnolia had a population of 11,162. The median age was 29.5 years. 20.0% of residents were under the age of 18 and 15.7% were 65 years of age or older. For every 100 females, there were 84.7 males, and for every 100 females age 18 and over, there were 82.0 males age 18 and over.

There were 4,072 households in Magnolia, including 2,338 families. Of all households, 29.8% had children under the age of 18 living in them. About 36.3% of all households were made up of individuals, and 15.4% had someone living alone who was 65 years of age or older. There were 4,770 housing units, of which 14.6% were vacant. The homeowner vacancy rate was 2.9% and the rental vacancy rate was 11.5%.

92.7% of residents lived in urban areas, while 7.3% lived in rural areas.

Magnolia racial composition
Race	Num.	Perc.
White (non-Hispanic)	5,586	50.04%
Black or African American (non-Hispanic)	4,568	40.92%
Native American	30	0.27%
Asian	148	1.33%
Other/Mixed	351	3.14%
Hispanic or Latino	479	4.29%

=== 2000 census ===
As of the census of 2000, there were 10,858 people, 4,204 households, and 2,577 families residing in the city. The population density was 1,165.3 inhabitants per square mile (449.9/km^{2}). There were 4,821 housing units at an average density of 517.4 per square mile (199.8/km^{2}). The racial makeup of the city was 58.24% White, 39.38% Black or African American, 0.22% Native American, 0.65% Asian, 0.02% Pacific Islander, 0.48% from other races, and 1.00% from two or more races. Hispanic or Latino of any race were 1.07% of the population.

There were 4,204 households, out of which 28.6% had children under the age of 18 living with them, 40.2% were married couples living together, 17.9% had a female householder with no husband present, and 38.7% were non-families. Of 4,204 households, 101 are unmarried partner households: 91 heterosexual, 4 same-sex male, 6 same-sex female households. 34.6% of all households were made up of individuals, and 16.6% had someone living alone who was 65 years of age or older. The average household size was 2.33 and the average family size was 3.01.

In the city, the population was spread out, with 24.2% under the age of 18, 16.8% from 18 to 24, 23.1% from 25 to 44, 18.4% from 45 to 64, and 17.5% who were 65 years of age or older. The median age was 33 years. For every 100 females, there were 84.8 males. For every 100 females age 18 and over, there were 79.4 males.

The median income for a household in the city was $29,897, as of 2005, and the median income for a family was $35,269. Males had a median income of $31,577 versus $20,840 for females. The per capita income for the city was $15,403. About 15.2% of families and 23.0% of the population were below the poverty line, including 32.9% of those under age 18 and 17.7% of those age 65 or over.

== Economy ==
Magnolia when it was founded was a cotton, farm production, and marketing town. Slowly the town grew, and in 1909 the Third District Agricultural School, subsequently known as Magnolia A&M and Southern State College, now known as Southern Arkansas University, was founded. During World War II Magnolia became a heavy manufacturing city. In 1938 oil and natural gas were discovered near the city in what was called the Magnolia Oil Field, the largest producing field by volume in the nation during the war. The city soon became a producer in steel, lumber, aluminum, bromine, rubber-coated products and fuel cells for the military.

The town's primary economic focus is heavy industrial, including Albemarle Corporation's Bromine Products Division (which has two facilities near town), Amfuel (which produces fuel cells for the military), and Sapa Group's extruded aluminum products facility. Also located in the area are several oil and brine drilling companies, many of which are locally owned, and timber companies, such as Deltic and Weyerhaeuser.

Major industrial employers: SAPA (750), Albemarle (739), Amfuel (380), CMC (344), Weyerhaeuser (250), Deltic Timber (125), Partee Flooring (95), and Southern Aluminum (90).

Largest non-manufacturing employers:

- Magnolia Public School System, 346
- Southern Arkansas University, 304
- Magnolia Hospital, 253
- Columbia County government, 110

The unemployment rate in Magnolia at one time prior to 2014 was 9.40%,. Future job growth over the following ten years was predicted to be 29.70%, according to Sterling's,

== Arts and culture ==
Magnolia is home to the Magnolia Blossom Festival and World Championship Steak Cookoff. The festival has been featured on the Food Network and attracts more than 40,000. A 'Festival of Lights' is held from late November through late December.

Magnolia is known locally for its downtown shopping on the square and for its murals - one of which was signed by Charlton Heston.

== Government ==
The city operated under a city council form of government until 2003. Voters elected to convert the city to a strong-mayor form of government, making the mayor's position a full-time position with veto power. Lane Jean was elected mayor in 1996. The city employs approximately 50 individuals in seven different departments, including the Police Department, the Fire Department, and Parks and Recreation.

== Animal shelter rescue ==
The city operated a shelter designed for approximately 20 dogs. On August 14, 2014, this facility was found to have 59 dogs in unclean conditions, without heat, air conditioning or even walls for the animals. With the city's permission, the local H&P Animal Alliance assisted in removing the dogs from the over-crowded shelter.

A number of dogs were sent to an out-of-state animal rescue group specializing in saving large-breed working dogs, Big Fluffy Dog Rescue. Big Fluffy Dog Rescue is a Nashville, Tennessee-based 501(c)(3) not-for-profit organization. The rescue effort cost an uncompensated $50,000.

== Education ==
=== Public and private schools ===
Public schools in the Magnolia School District include:

- Walker Pre-K Center (PK)
- Magnolia Eastside Elementary (K-3)
- Magnolia Central Elementary (4-6)
- Magnolia Junior High School (7-9)
- Magnolia High School (10-12)

Private schools in Magnolia include:

- Columbia Christian School

Magnolia High School is known for its boys' track teams and baseball program. The track team has won the State Championship five out of the last six years. The Panther baseball team was crowned State Champions in 2011 and have won four straight conference titles. The Magnolia Panthers compete in the Arkansas Activities Association 5A-Southwest conference.

Since 1999 Magnolia High School graduates have received well over $1 million in college scholarship money each year, with the class of 2008 being first to reach $2 million in scholarship offers.

Graduation rates for the city are: High school or higher, 75.4%; Bachelor's degree or higher, 24.1%; Graduate or professional degree, 7.0%.

Columbia Christian School (commonly referred to as CCS) is a private co-ed K-12 Christian school. Columbia Christian is well known for their athletics programs, having won multiple state, regional, district, and conference titles across several junior high and varsity sports. Arguably most notably, the Columbia Lady Crusaders varsity softball team won 5 straight state titles in the Arkansas Association of Christian Schools in the mid-2010s. They also have state titles at the varsity level in baseball, golf, soccer, women's volleyball, and women's basketball. They previously competed in the Arkansas Association of Christian Schools (AACS) and joined the Heartland Christian Athletic Association (HCAA) in 2018. After many successful seasons across all sports in the HCAA, Columbia Christian School became a member of the Arkansas Activities Association in 2025, and the Crusaders now compete in Class 1A - District 8; they still maintain their standard of competition and success across the sports they compete in.

Despite smaller class sizes, graduates of Columbia Christian School receive several hundred thousand dollars in scholarship money annually. Graduates of Columbia Christian School have gone on to work in various fields, including Christian ministry, healthcare, education, national intelligence, law, STEM fields, and more.

=== Colleges and universities ===
Magnolia is the home of Southern Arkansas University, a public university that offers four-year and advanced (Master's level) degrees in business, public administration, computer information systems, education, counseling, education administration, and criminal justice. With an enrollment of 4,771, its most notable programs are agriculture, business, and education. The university's cultural focus is Harton Theatre, which provides a venue for both departmental plays, concerts, and local cultural events.

== Infrastructure ==
=== Airport ===
Magnolia Municipal Airport is a city-owned, public-use airport located three nautical miles (6 km) southeast of the central business district of Magnolia.

=== Highways ===
- U.S. Highway 82
- U.S. Highway 79
- U.S. Highway 371
- Arkansas Highway 19
- Arkansas Highway 355
- U.S. Highway 82 Business
- U.S. Highway 79 Business

== Notable people ==
- Harvey C. Couch (1877-1941), Arkansas entrepreneur who controlled a regional utility and railroad empire; raised in Magnolia
- Billy Joe Daugherty (1952–2009), founder and pastor of Victory Christian Center in Tulsa, Oklahoma
- Roy Green, former wide receiver in the National Football League
- Charlaine Harris, author who writes what are referred to as the Sookie Stackhouse novels
- Lane Jean (born c. 1959), former mayor of Magnolia and current Republican member of the Arkansas House of Representatives
- Andrew R. Johnson (1856–1933), state senator and mayor of Homer; taught school near Magnolia in the 1890s
- Larry McCray (born c. 1963), blues guitarist and singer. His family moved to Saginaw, Michigan in 1973.
- Sidney Sanders McMath (1912-2003), governor of Arkansas (1949-1953), Major General, U.S.M.C. Reserve (1965-1970)
- Mike Runnels (1945-2015), Lieutenant Governor of New Mexico
- Horace M. Wade, former U.S. Air Force general, born in Magnolia 1916
- Carl Wafer, former defensive end in the National Football League; born in Magnolia

== Annexation ==
On January 12, 2007, Magnolia annexed 2,325 acres (9.41 km^{2}) east of the city, which includes approximately 1,100 people, increasing the population to 11,578. The city was expected to receive between $60,000 to $70,000 in state turnbacks per year as a result.

== Gallery ==
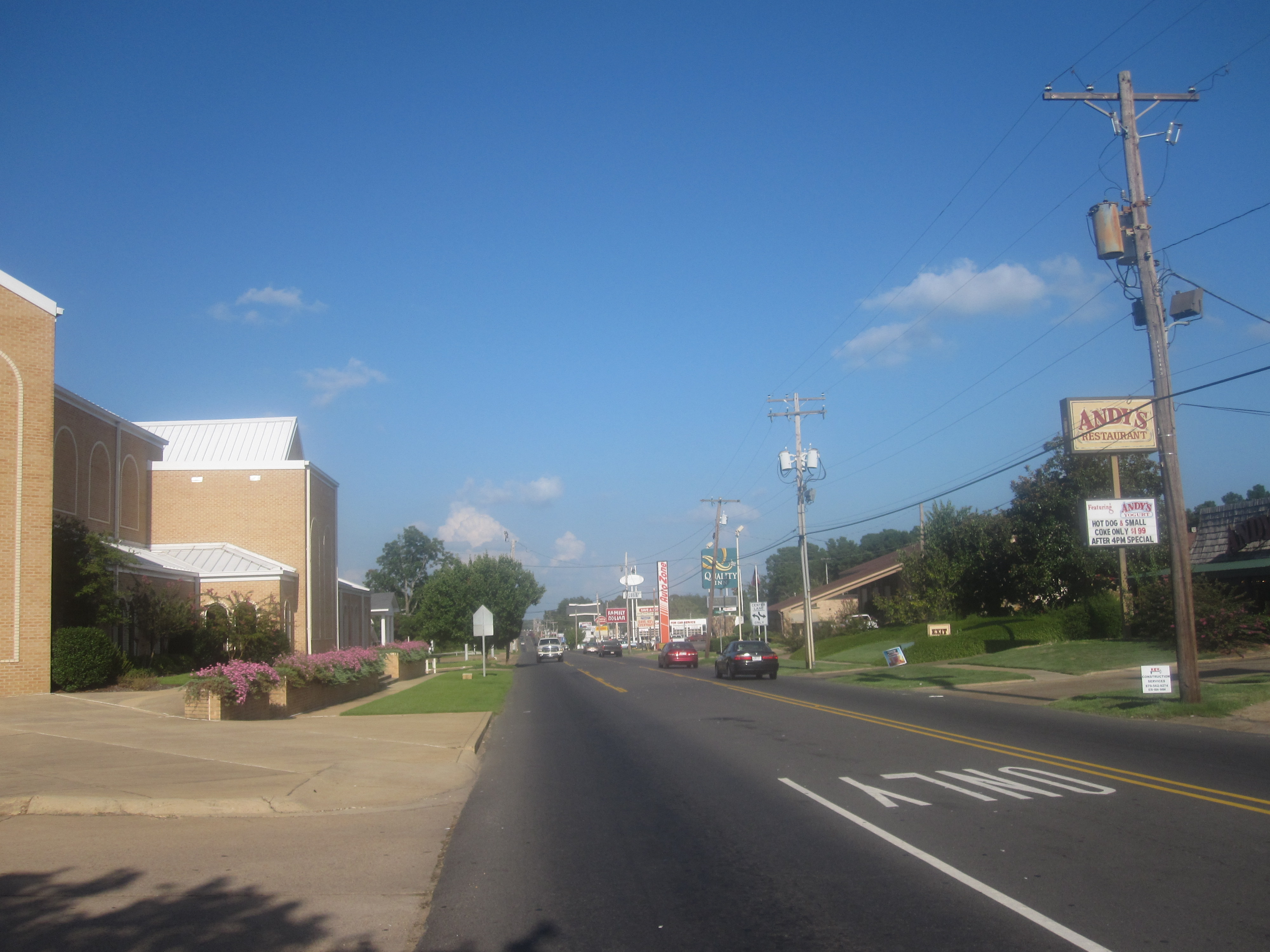
Downtown Magnolia

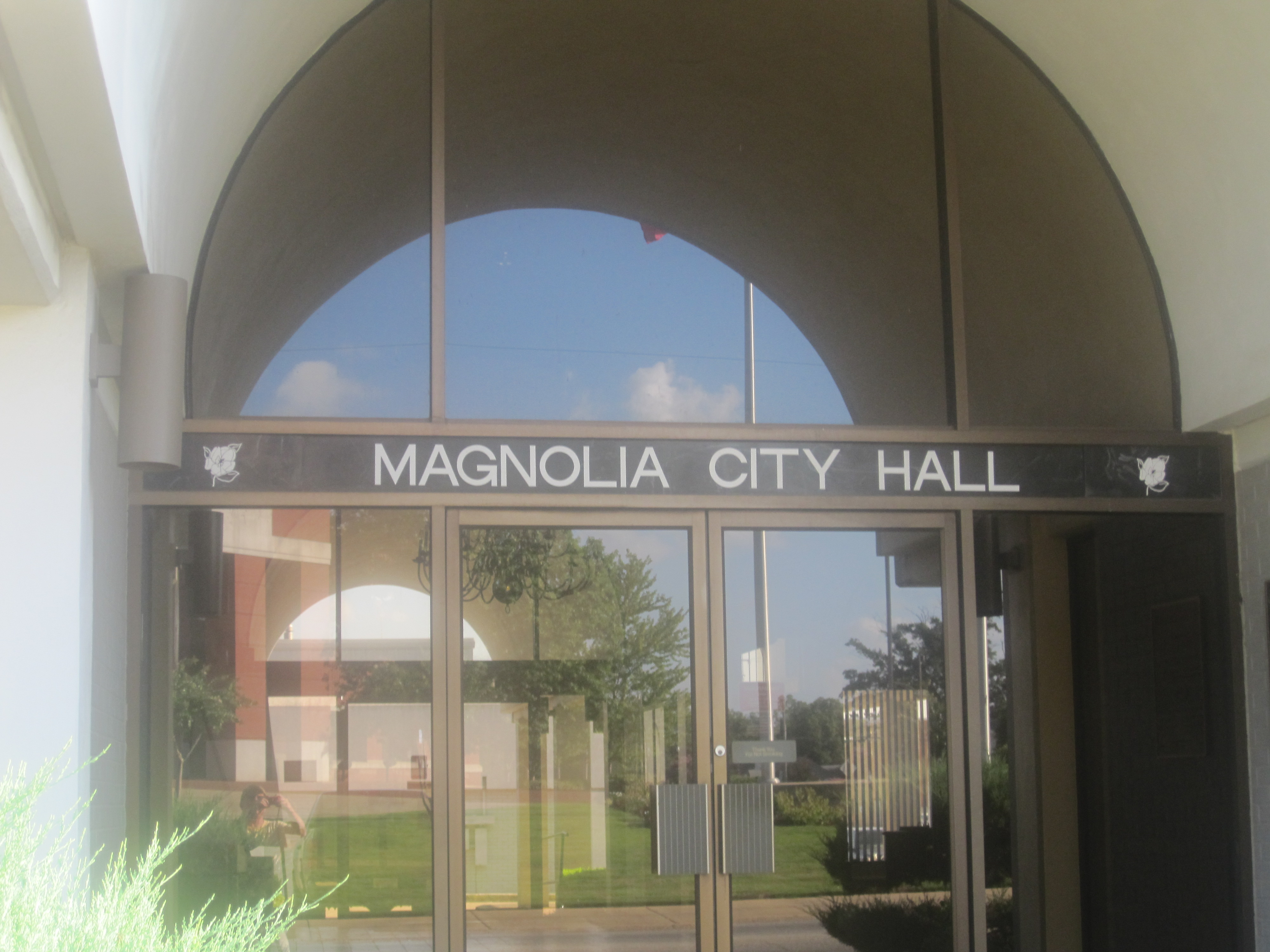
Magnolia City Hall

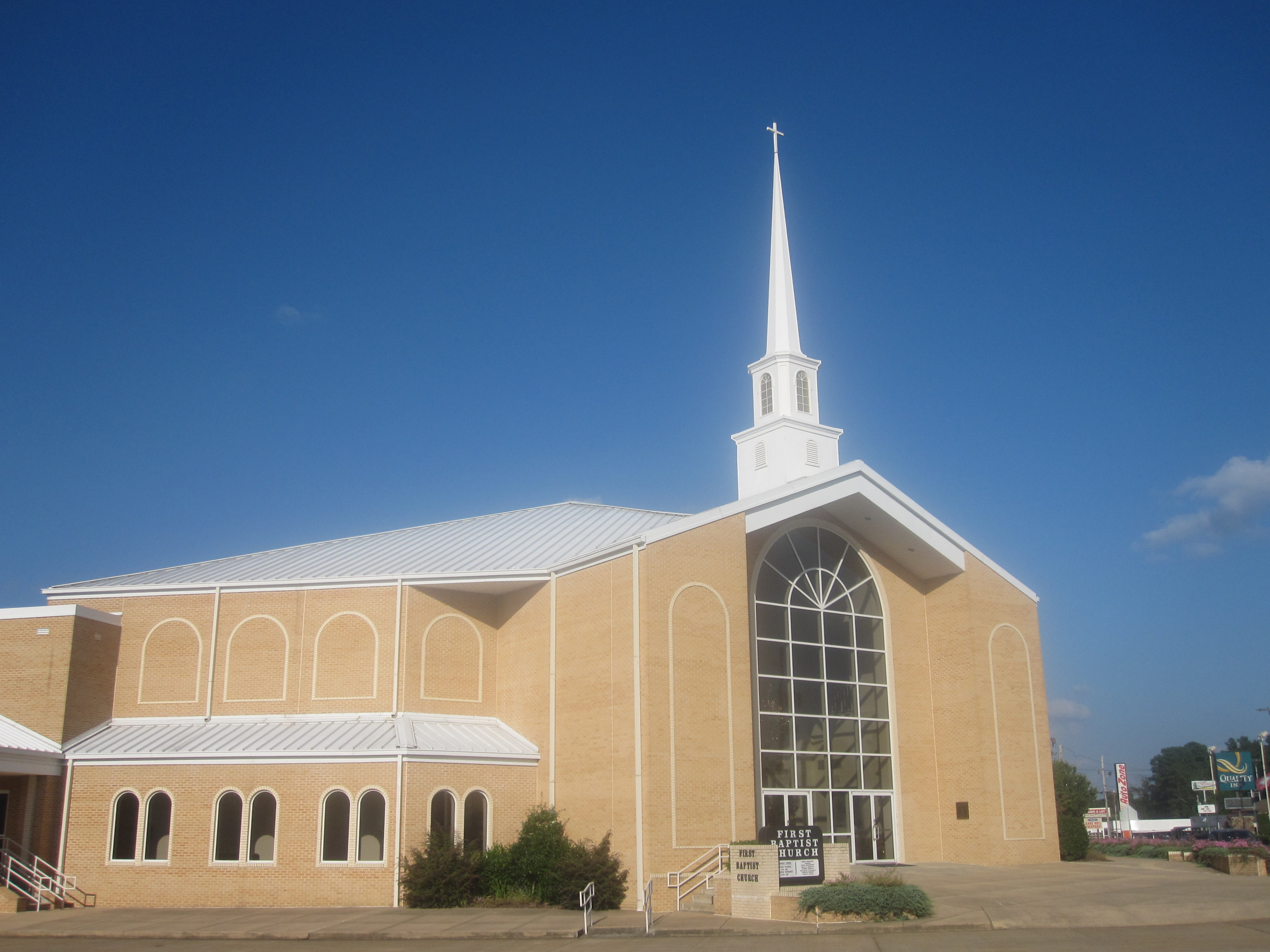
First Baptist Church of Magnolia

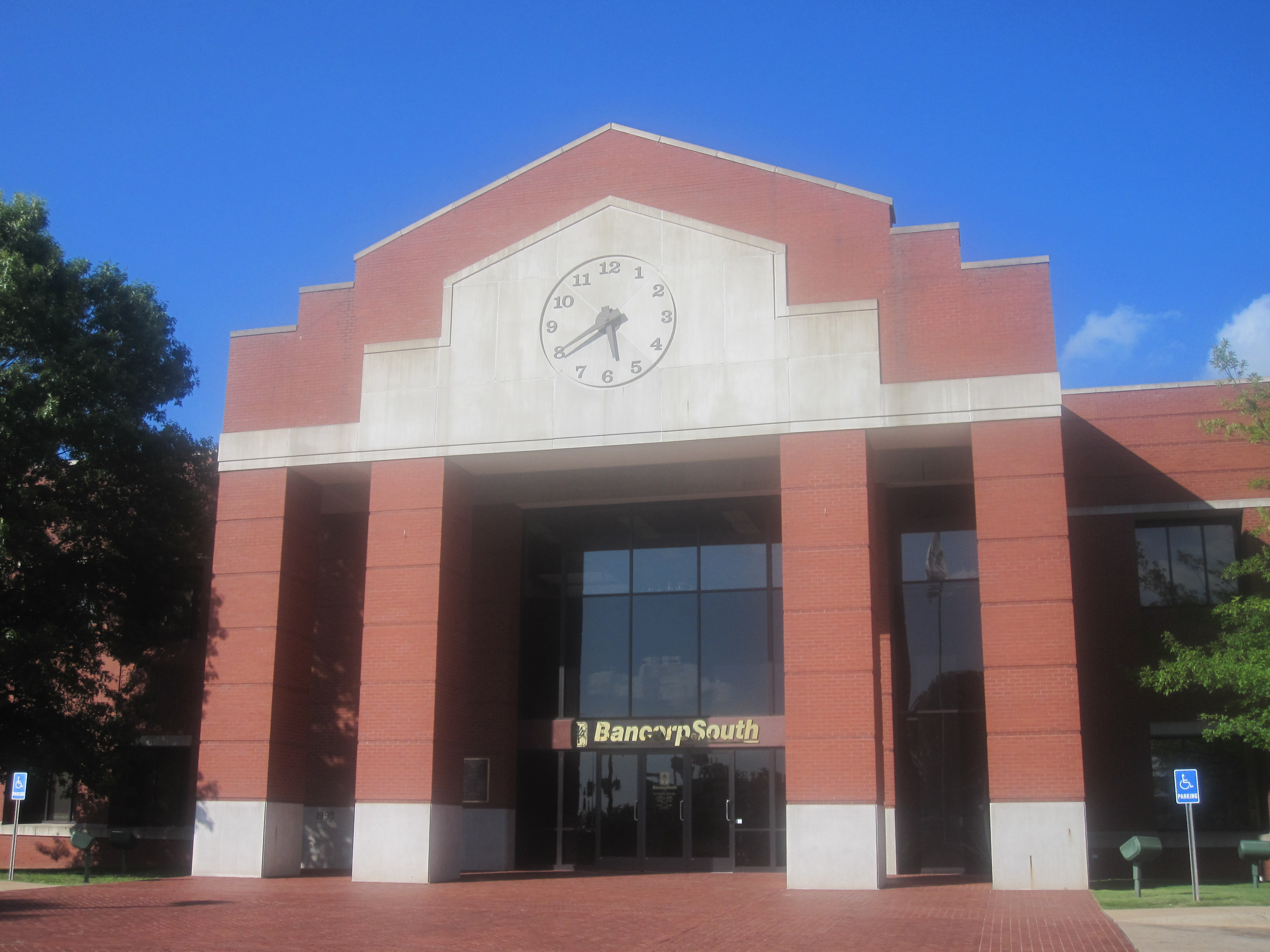
Bancorp South in Magnolia is located across from City Hall.

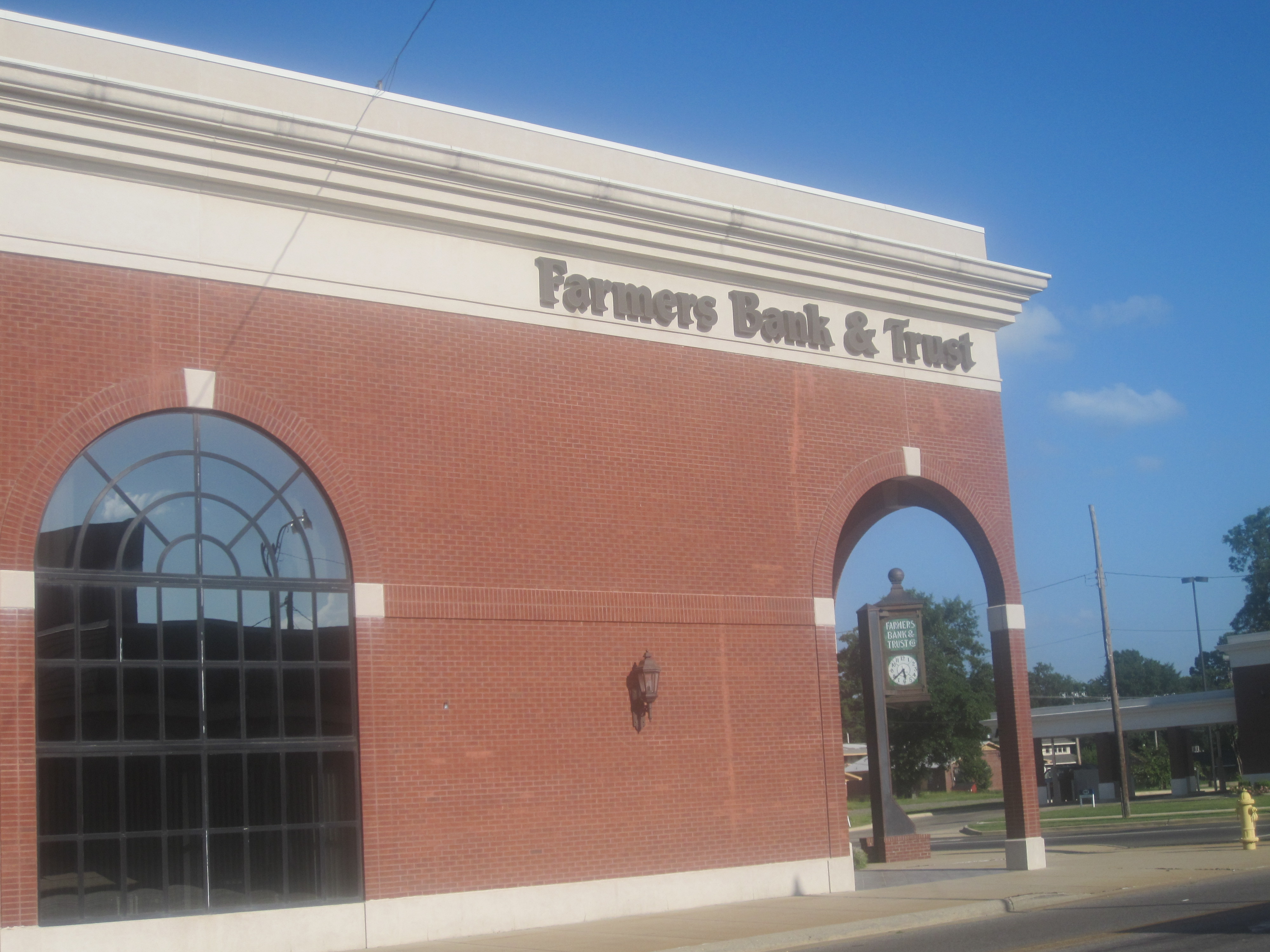
Farmers Bank and Trust Company in downtown Magnolia
