= Hamburg High School =

Hamburg High School can refer to:

- Hamburg High School (Arkansas) - Hamburg, Arkansas
- Hamburg High School (Hamburg, New York)
