= Portland, Arkansas =

- City
- Location of Portland in Ashley County, Arkansas.
- Coordinates: 33°14′14″N 91°30′28″W
- Country: United States
- State: Arkansas
- County: Ashley

Area
  - Total: 1.07 sq mi (2.77 km^{2})
  - Land: 1.07 sq mi (2.77 km^{2})
  - Water: 0 sq mi (0.00 km^{2})
- Elevation: 128 ft (39 m)

Population (2020)
  - Total: 325
  - Estimate (2025): 302 ▼
  - Density: 303.4/sq mi (117.13/km^{2})
- Time zone: UTC-6 (Central (CST))
  - Summer (DST): UTC-5 (CDT)
- ZIP code: 71663
- Area code: 870
- FIPS code: 05-56750
- GNIS feature ID: 2404561
- Website: portlandar.gov

Portland is a city in Ashley County, Arkansas, United States. As of the 2020 census, Portland had a population of 325. Portland was first settled in the 1830s, and named for its early status as a steamboat port. It was incorporated in 1893.

== History ==
Portland was formed in the 1830s along Bayou Bartholomew by two plantation owners. As Portland grew, most of its residents were store owners who received goods from the port, for which the city was named. In the 1890s, the area was reached by a railroad, and Portland was incorporated in 1893. With the railroad allowing easier transport of timber, Portland entered the logging industry, with four large mills running in the early 1900s. Since then, the town's main business has come from agriculture, with many old, established farms located in the surrounding area.

== Geography ==
According to the United States Census Bureau, the city has a total area of 1.1 square miles (2.8 km^{2}), all of it land.

Portland is located on north-south U.S. Route 165 at the junction with State Highway 160.

=== Climate ===
Climate data for Portland, Arkansas (1991–2020 normals, extremes 1909–2023)
Month	Jan	Feb	Mar	Apr	May	Jun	Jul	Aug	Sep	Oct	Nov	Dec	Year
Record high °F (°C)	86 (30)	89 (32)	94 (34)	96 (36)	102 (39)	106 (41)	109 (43)	110 (43)	106 (41)	99 (37)	89 (32)	85 (29)	110 (43)
Mean maximum °F (°C)	73 (23)	77 (25)	82 (28)	87 (31)	92 (33)	96 (36)	98 (37)	99 (37)	96 (36)	90 (32)	81 (27)	75 (24)	99 (37)
Mean daily maximum °F (°C)	52.8 (11.6)	56.9 (13.8)	65.1 (18.4)	74.0 (23.3)	81.9 (27.7)	88.4 (31.3)	90.6 (32.6)	91.2 (32.9)	86.8 (30.4)	76.7 (24.8)	64.6 (18.1)	54.6 (12.6)	73.6 (23.1)
Daily mean °F (°C)	42.7 (5.9)	46.3 (7.9)	54.4 (12.4)	63.1 (17.3)	71.7 (22.1)	78.9 (26.1)	81.4 (27.4)	81.0 (27.2)	75.5 (24.2)	64.4 (18.0)	53.0 (11.7)	44.8 (7.1)	63.1 (17.3)
Mean daily minimum °F (°C)	32.6 (0.3)	35.7 (2.1)	43.7 (6.5)	52.2 (11.2)	61.5 (16.4)	69.3 (20.7)	72.1 (22.3)	70.8 (21.6)	64.2 (17.9)	52.2 (11.2)	41.4 (5.2)	35.0 (1.7)	52.6 (11.4)
Mean minimum °F (°C)	19 (−7)	23 (−5)	28 (−2)	38 (3)	48 (9)	60 (16)	65 (18)	63 (17)	50 (10)	37 (3)	27 (−3)	23 (−5)	19 (−7)
Record low °F (°C)	−4 (−20)	2 (−17)	13 (−11)	28 (−2)	38 (3)	48 (9)	54 (12)	52 (11)	38 (3)	23 (−5)	16 (−9)	0 (−18)	−4 (−20)
Average precipitation inches (mm)	5.68 (144)	6.04 (153)	5.10 (130)	5.72 (145)	4.91 (125)	3.42 (87)	4.29 (109)	3.64 (92)	3.41 (87)	4.25 (108)	4.38 (111)	5.56 (141)	56.4 (1,432)
Average snowfall inches (cm)	0.6 (1.5)	0.2 (0.51)	0.1 (0.25)	0.0 (0.0)	0.0 (0.0)	0.0 (0.0)	0.0 (0.0)	0.0 (0.0)	0.0 (0.0)	0.0 (0.0)	0.0 (0.0)	0.1 (0.25)	1 (2.51)
Average precipitation days (≥ 0.01 in)	9.0	8.6	9.0	9.0	8.9	7.1	7.5	6.5	5.6	6.4	7.2	8.4	93.2
Average snowy days (≥ 0.01 in)	0.3	0.1	0.1	0	0	0	0	0	0	0	0	0.1	0.6
Source: NOAA, (extremes)

== Points of interest ==
The historic Dean House and Pugh House were designed by architect Charles L. Thompson. Both are listed on the U.S. National Register of Historic Places.

== Demographics ==
Historical population
Census	Pop.	Note	%±
1880	19		—
1900	426		—
1910	823		93.2%
1920	618		−24.9%
1930	543		−12.1%
1940	518		−4.6%
1950	517		−0.2%
1960	566		9.5%
1970	662		17.0%
1980	701		5.9%
1990	560		−20.1%
2000	552		−1.4%
2010	430		−22.1%
2020	325		−24.4%
2025 (est.)	302	▼	−7.1%
U.S. Decennial Census

=== 2020 census ===
Portland racial composition
Race	Num.	Perc.
White (non-Hispanic)	170	52.31%
Black or African American (non-Hispanic)	121	37.23%
Native American	1	0.31%
Other/Mixed	8	2.46%
Hispanic or Latino	25	7.69%

As of the 2020 United States census, there were 325 people, 178 households, and 92 families residing in the city.

=== 2000 census ===
As of the census of 2000, there were 552 people, 213 households, and 152 families residing in the city. The population density was 511.1 inhabitants per square mile (197.3/km^{2}). There were 247 housing units at an average density of 228.7 per square mile (88.3/km^{2}). The racial makeup of the city was 55.62% White, 42.93% Black or African American, 0.18% Native American, 0.91% from other races, and 0.36% from two or more races. 2.72% of the population were Hispanic or Latino of any race.

There were 213 households, out of which 31.5% had children under the age of 18 living with them, 54.0% were married couples living together, 15.0% had a female householder with no husband present, and 28.2% were non-families. 26.3% of all households were made up of individuals, and 15.5% had someone living alone who was 65 years of age or older. The average household size was 2.59 and the average family size was 3.12.

In the city, the population was spread out, with 27.4% under the age of 18, 8.2% from 18 to 24, 25.2% from 25 to 44, 21.7% from 45 to 64, and 17.6% who were 65 years of age or older. The median age was 38 years. For every 100 females, there were 89.0 males. For every 100 females age 18 and over, there were 93.7 males.

The median income for a household in the city was $28,036, and the median income for a family was $32,375. Males had a median income of $23,750 versus $20,446 for females. The per capita income for the city was $13,094. About 14.5% of families and 15.9% of the population were below the poverty line, including 11.3% of those under age 18 and 19.3% of those age 65 or over.

== Education ==
Public education is provided to elementary and secondary school students by the Hamburg School District leading to graduation from Hamburg High School.

The Portland School District merged into the Hamburg district on July 1, 1984.

== Notable people ==
- Fred Haas, professional golfer
- Lloyd Moseby, born in Portland, major league baseball player

== Climate ==
The climate in this area is characterized by hot, humid summers and generally mild to cool winters. According to the Köppen Climate Classification system, Portland has a humid subtropical climate, abbreviated "Cfa" on climate maps.
