= Wilmot, Arkansas =

- City
- Location of Wilmot in Ashley County, Arkansas.
- Coordinates: 33°03′31″N 91°34′30″W
- Country: United States
- State: Arkansas
- County: Ashley

Area
  - Total: 1.77 sq mi (4.59 km^{2})
  - Land: 1.77 sq mi (4.58 km^{2})
  - Water: 0.0039 sq mi (0.01 km^{2})
- Elevation: 112 ft (34 m)

Population (2020)
  - Total: 416
  - Estimate (2025): 395 ▼
  - Density: 235.1/sq mi (90.79/km^{2})
- Time zone: UTC-6 (Central (CST))
  - Summer (DST): UTC-5 (CDT)
- ZIP code: 71676
- Area code: 870
- FIPS code: 05-75890
- GNIS feature ID: 2405756

Wilmot is a city in Ashley County, Arkansas, United States. As of the 2020 census, Wilmot had a population of 416.

== History ==
In 1927, a young Black man named Winston Pounds was tortured and hanged by a mob of some fifty armed white men, for allegedly having attempted to assault a white woman.

== Geography ==
According to the United States Census Bureau, the city has a total area of 1.9 square miles (4.8 km^{2}), of which 0.012 square miles (0.03 km^{2}), or 0.55%, is water. The town borders Lake Enterprise, a popular location for local fishing and watersports.

== Demographics ==
Historical population
Census	Pop.	Note	%±
1900	378		—
1910	622		64.6%
1920	627		0.8%
1930	777		23.9%
1940	625		−19.6%
1950	721		15.4%
1960	732		1.5%
1970	1,132		54.6%
1980	1,227		8.4%
1990	1,047		−14.7%
2000	786		−24.9%
2010	550		−30.0%
2020	416		−24.4%
2025 (est.)	395	▼	−5.0%
U.S. Decennial Census

=== Racial and ethnic composition ===
Wilmot city, Arkansas – Racial and ethnic composition Note: the US Census treats Hispanic/Latino as an ethnic category. This table excludes Latinos from the racial categories and assigns them to a separate category. Hispanics/Latinos may be of any race.
Race / Ethnicity (NH = Non-Hispanic)	Pop 2000	Pop 2010	Pop 2020	% 2000	% 2010	% 2020
White alone (NH)	190	109	71	24.17%	19.82%	17.07%
Black or African American alone (NH)	586	422	321	74.55%	76.73%	77.16%
Native American or Alaska Native alone (NH)	0	1	0	0.00%	0.18%	0.00%
Asian alone (NH)	0	0	0	0.00%	0.00%	0.00%
Native Hawaiian or Pacific Islander alone (NH)	0	0	0	0.00%	0.00%	0.00%
Other race alone (NH)	0	0	0	0.00%	0.00%	0.00%
Mixed race or Multiracial (NH)	5	3	7	0.64%	0.55%	1.68%
Hispanic or Latino (any race)	5	15	17	0.64%	2.73%	4.09%
Total	786	550	416	100.00%	100.00%	100.00%

=== 2000 census ===
As of the census of 2000, there were 786 people, 290 households, and 187 families residing in the city. The population density was 422.7 inhabitants per square mile (163.2/km^{2}). There were 367 housing units at an average density of 197.4 per square mile (76.2/km^{2}). The racial makeup of the city was 24.17% White, 75.19% Black or African American, and 0.64% from two or more races. 0.64% of the population were Hispanic or Latino of any race.

There were 290 households, out of which 27.2% had children under the age of 18 living with them, 35.5% were married couples living together, 24.1% had a female householder with no husband present, and 35.2% were non-families. 33.1% of all households were made up of individuals, and 16.9% had someone living alone who was 65 years of age or older. The average household size was 2.54 and the average family size was 3.27.

In the city, the population was spread out, with 26.8% under the age of 18, 9.0% from 18 to 24, 21.0% from 25 to 44, 22.8% from 45 to 64, and 20.4% who were 65 years of age or older. The median age was 39 years. For every 100 females, there were 77.0 males. For every 100 females age 18 and over, there were 80.8 males.

The median income for a household in the city was $14,167, and the median income for a family was $20,917. Males had a median income of $22,188 versus $17,250 for females. The per capita income for the city was $9,528. About 38.1% of families and 40.4% of the population were below the poverty line, including 53.6% of those under age 18 and 49.2% of those age 65 or over.

== Education ==
Public education is provided to elementary and secondary school students from the Hamburg School District. Students complete their secondary education and graduate from Hamburg High School.

It was served by the Wilmot School District until July 1, 1986, when it consolidated into Hamburg SD. The Hamburg district continued to operate Wilmot Elementary School. Circa 1996 the school had 100 students; circa 2016 this was down to 42. Around that time the Hamburg district board decided to close the school citing the lower enrollment and financial concerns. A party filed a lawsuit against the district in response to the closure.
