= Fountain Hill, Arkansas =

- Town
- Location of Fountain Hill in Ashley County, Arkansas.
- Coordinates: 33°21′27″N 91°51′04″W
- Country: United States
- State: Arkansas
- County: Ashley

Area
  - Total: 0.57 sq mi (1.47 km^{2})
  - Land: 0.57 sq mi (1.47 km^{2})
  - Water: 0 sq mi (0.00 km^{2})
- Elevation: 190 ft (58 m)

Population (2020)
  - Total: 108
  - Estimate (2025): 102 ▼
  - Density: 190.3/sq mi (73.46/km^{2})
- Time zone: UTC-6 (Central (CST))
  - Summer (DST): UTC-5 (CDT)
- ZIP code: 71642
- Area code: 870
- FIPS code: 05-24670
- GNIS feature ID: 2406513

Fountain Hill is a town in Ashley County, Arkansas, United States. As of the 2020 census, Fountain Hill had a population of 108.

== Geography ==
According to the United States Census Bureau, the town has a total area of 0.58 square miles (1.5 km^{2}), all land.

== Demographics ==
Historical population
Census	Pop.	Note	%±
1930	215		—
1940	267		24.2%
1950	320		19.9%
1960	230		−28.1%
1970	266		15.7%
1980	352		32.3%
1990	195		−44.6%
2000	159		−18.5%
2010	175		10.1%
2020	108		−38.3%
2025 (est.)	102	▼	−5.6%
U.S. Decennial Census; 2014 Estimate

As of the census of 2000, there were 159 people, 66 households, and 39 families residing in the town. The population density was 104.1 people/km^{2} (270 people/mi^{2}). There were 77 housing units at an average density of 50.4 units/km^{2} (131 units/mi^{2}). The racial makeup of the town was 60.38% White, 35.22% Black or African American, 1.89% from other races, and 2.52% from two or more races. 2.52% of the population were Hispanic or Latino of any race.

There were 66 households, out of which 19.7% had children under the age of 18 living with them, 47.0% were married couples living together, 10.6% had a female householder with no husband present, and 40.9% were non-families. 33.3% of all households were made up of individuals, and 18.2% had someone living alone who was 65 years of age or older. The average household size was 2.41 and the average family size was 3.08.

In the town, the population was spread out, with 24.5% under the age of 18, 10.1% from 18 to 24, 22.6% from 25 to 44, 26.4% from 45 to 64, and 16.4% who were 65 years of age or older. The median age was 39 years. For every 100 females, there were 80.7 males and for every 100 females aged 18 and over, there were 84.6 males.

The median income for a household in the town was $25,250, and the median income for a family was $37,750. Males had a median income of $22,000 versus $16,875 for females. The per capita income for the town was $12,568. About 2.7% of families and 10.6% of the population were below the poverty line, including 4.0% of those under the age of eighteen and 17.2% of those 65 or over.

== Education ==
Public education is provide to elementary and secondary school students from the Hamburg School District leading to graduation from Hamburg High School.

Prior to school district consolidation on July 1, 2004, students attended Fountain Hill School District, and its Fountain Hill High School, which had the Wildcat as its mascot.

== Notable people ==
- Joseph Jackson, (1928–2018) patriarch of the Jackson family.
- Jeremy Sparks, hall of fame cowboy and author, graduate of Fountain Hill
- Jenny Wingfield, screenwriter and author, born in Fountain Hill
