= Fountain Hill School District =

Former school district in Arkansas

Coordinates: 33°21′20″N 91°51′4″W

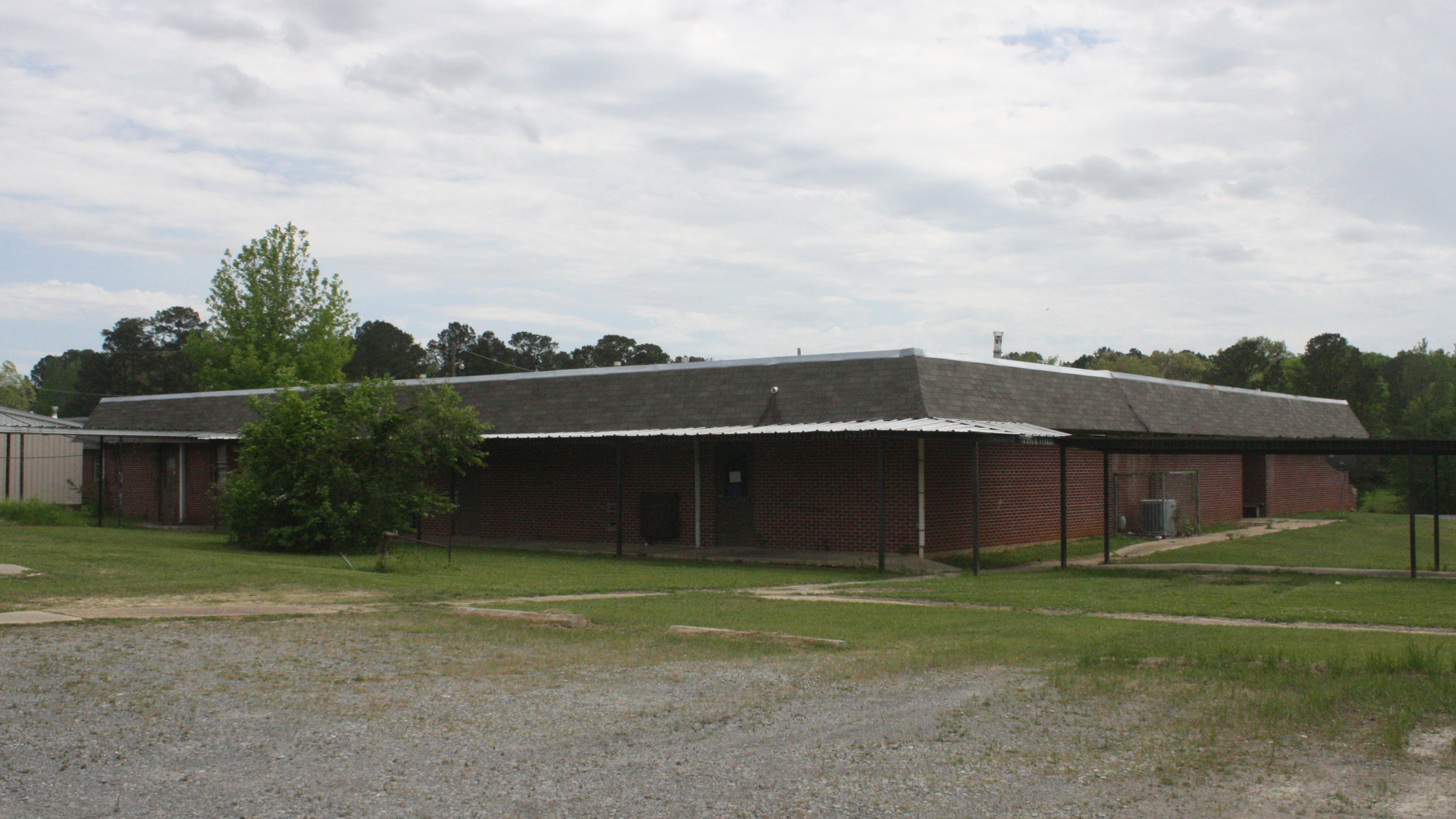
- Former Fountain Hill School

Address
- 200 E. Elm Street Fountain Hill, Arkansas 71642; United States

District information
- Type: Public
- Closed: July 1, 2004
- Schools: 1

Students and staff
- District mascot: Wildcat

Other information
- Website: Official website (archive)

Fountain Hill School District was a school district in Fountain Hill, Arkansas. It operated one school, Fountain Hill School. The mascot was the wildcat.

On July 1, 2004, it consolidated into the Hamburg School District.
