= Lynching of Winston Pounds =

1927 lynching of a Black man in Arkansas

Coordinates: 33°3′33″N 91°34′26″W

Winston Pounds was an African-American man who was lynched by a mob in Wilmot, Arkansas, on August 25 or 26, 1927.

Pounds was hanged after being accused of breaking into and entering the house of a white man, and then allegedly assaulting his wife. An armed mob of fifty white men took him from the sheriff and his deputies, and hanged him a mile and a half away from town. A Black newspaper, however, noted that there had been bad blood, and that the white man, J. W. McGarry, had been seeking revenge on Pounds because Pounds's father had gotten the best of McGarry's father years earlier. There was no other evidence other than bloodhounds supposedly following the alleged assailant's tracks.

== Description ==
According to the US Census, Winston Pounds Jr. was born to Winston and Florence Pounds, farmers, around 1906. The lynching involved him and a white man called J. W. McGarry. Pounds was described in one newspaper as "a good young man, who was never known to be in any kind of trouble with anyone." He was 20 years old at the time of his murder.

=== Alleged attack ===
As Nancy Snell Griffits notes in the entry for the Encyclopedia of Arkansas, with lynchings there are often different accounts of the events leading up the murder. The Indianapolis Recorder, a Black newspaper, said that there had been history between the fathers of Pounds and McGarry: years before, the father of Pounds had outwitted or defeated the father of McGarry in some altercation, and McGarry nursed a grudge and sought to get even. The Arkansas Gazette, a white-owned newspaper with a white audience, did not report any such detail. It simply claims that Pounds, a "Negro farmhand", broke into the house of J. W. McGarry and his wife while they were asleep, and assaulted McGarry's wife, whose screams caused Pounds to flee. Conflicting accounts, however, say that McGarry was not in town and that his wife stayed at the house with his sister, and that it was the sister who alerted the neighbors.

Bloodhounds were used, and they led the authorities to the home of Pounds, who was arrested at 2 in the afternoon, on August 25. He, supposedly, confessed right away, and said he wanted to assault the first white woman he could. But the Indianapolis Recorder reported differently, saying that there was no evidence other than the bloodhounds pointing out Pounds, and that no other evidence was even sought. Pounds was taken into town by Sheriff John C. Riley, who left him in the car while he talked with his deputies about how to avoid Pounds falling victim to mob violence. That, apparently, created an opportunity for a few men to hijack the sheriff's car and drive out of town, with a mob in cars following them. Sheriff Riley, reportedly, was unable to follow them because he could not figure out where they went. The St. Louis Star-Times had a slightly different version of events, saying a group of fifty men "covered the officers with pistols", and the Associated Press reported similarly. Nancy Snell Griffiths added that it seems likely that the sheriff and his deputy left their prisoner intentionally for the mob to abduct.

=== The lynching and its after effects ===
The mob hung Pounds from a tree, and they seem to have left him there still alive. His body was still there later that evening and the paper noted that the streets were quiet, and "no further trouble is expected." The body was cut down the next day, and an inquest was held by Justice W. N. Wilhite. No witnesses were called up, and the sheriff did not even appear. A circuit judge, Turner Butler, claimed not having been formally notified of the lynching, and that he did not plan for an investigation. The sheriff's deputies thought an investigation was going to be held, with evidence presented to a grand jury in February, but that they had not discussed this with the sheriff. An interesting detail did emerge: "One of the sheriff;s deputies said that he did not hear Pounds say anything about attacking any white woman he found, and that Pounds had not confessed in his presence." In the end, "The verdict was that Pounds had died at the hands of persons unknown." What the Arkansas Gazette did not report was the torture that Pounds underwent while being hanged: "He was raised several feet from the ground, and acid was poured into his eyes and mouth. Pounds' lower abdomen was stuck full of holes with knives."
