= Scottie Pippen =

American basketball player (born 1965)

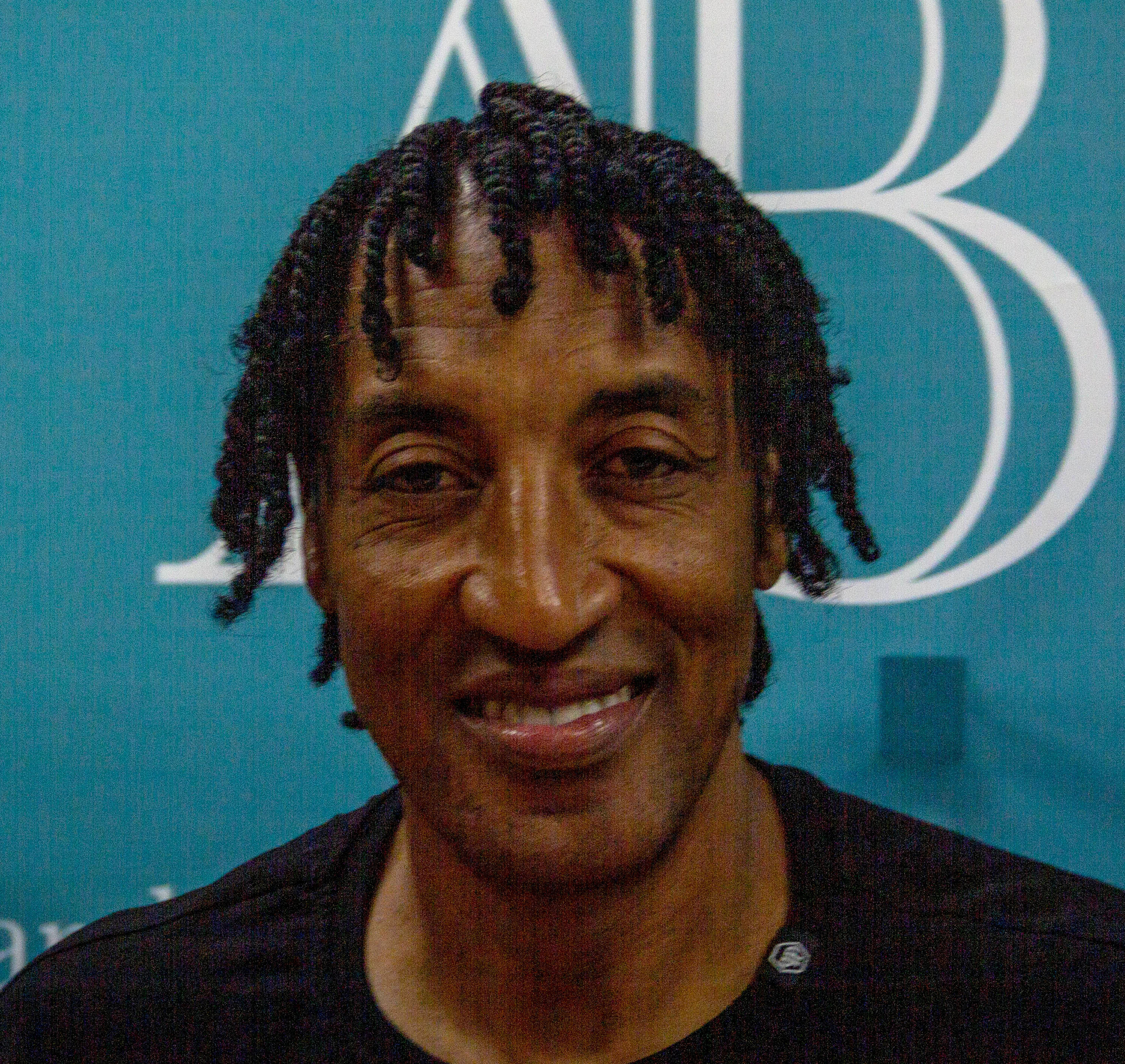
- Pippen in 2022

Personal information
- Born: September 25, 1965 (age 61) Hamburg, Arkansas, U.S.
- Listed height: 6 ft 8 in (2.03 m)
- Listed weight: 228 lb (103 kg)

Career information
- High school: Hamburg (Hamburg, Arkansas)
- College: Central Arkansas (1983–1987)
- NBA draft: 1987: 1st round, 5th overall pick
- Drafted by: Seattle SuperSonics
- Playing career: 1987–2004, 2008
- Position: Small forward
- Number: 33

Career history
- 1987–1998: Chicago Bulls
- 1999: Houston Rockets
- 1999–2003: Portland Trail Blazers
- 2003–2004: Chicago Bulls
- 2008: Torpan Pojat
- 2008: Sundsvall Dragons

Career highlights
- 6× NBA champion (1991–1993, 1996–1998); 7× NBA All-Star (1990, 1992–1997); NBA All-Star Game MVP (1994); 3× All-NBA First Team (1994–1996); 2× All-NBA Second Team (1992, 1997); 2× All-NBA Third Team (1993, 1998); 8× NBA All-Defensive First Team (1992–1999); 2× NBA All-Defensive Second Team (1991, 2000); NBA steals leader (1995); NBA anniversary team (50th, 75th); No. 33 retired by Chicago Bulls; USA Basketball Male Athlete of the Year (1996); 2× Consensus NAIA All-American (1986, 1987); No. 33 retired by Central Arkansas Bears

Career NBA statistics
- Points: 18,940 (16.1 ppg)
- Rebounds: 7,494 (6.4 rpg)
- Assists: 6,135 (5.2 apg)
- Stats at NBA.com
- Stats at Basketball Reference
- Basketball Hall of Fame
Medals
Men's basketball
Representing the United States
Olympic Games
Gold medal – first place	1992 Barcelona	Team competition
Gold medal – first place	1996 Atlanta	Team competition
FIBA Americas Championship
Gold medal – first place	1992 Portland	Men's basketball

Scotty Maurice Pippen Sr. (born September 25, 1965), commonly known as Scottie Pippen, is an American former professional basketball player who played 17 seasons in the National Basketball Association (NBA), winning six NBA championships with the Chicago Bulls. Considered one of the greatest small forwards of all time, Pippen played an important role in transforming the Bulls into a championship team and popularizing the NBA around the world during the 1990s.

Pippen was named to the NBA All-Defensive First Team eight consecutive times and the All-NBA First Team three times. He was a seven-time NBA All-Star and was the NBA All-Star Game MVP in 1994. He was named one of the 50 Greatest Players in NBA History during the 1996–97 season, and is one of five players to have his jersey retired by the Chicago Bulls (the others being Jerry Sloan, Bob Love, Michael Jordan, and Derrick Rose). He played a main role on both the 1992 Chicago Bulls Championship team and the 1996 Chicago Bulls Championship team, which were selected as two of the Top 10 Teams in NBA History. His biography on the Naismith Basketball Hall of Fame's website states that "the multidimensional Pippen ran the court like a point guard, attacked the boards like a power forward, and swished the nets like a shooting guard." During his 17-year career, he played 12 seasons with the Bulls, one with the Houston Rockets and four with the Portland Trail Blazers, making the postseason 16 consecutive times. In October 2021, Pippen was again honored as one of the league's greatest players of all time by being named to the NBA 75th Anniversary Team.

Pippen is one of the only two NBA players to have won an NBA title and Olympic gold medal in the same year twice (the other one is Jrue Holiday), having done so in both 1992 and 1996. He was a part of the 1992 U.S. Olympic "Dream Team" which beat its opponents by an average of 44 points. He was also a key figure in the 1996 Olympic team, alongside former "Dream Team" members Karl Malone, John Stockton, Charles Barkley, and David Robinson, as well as newer faces such as Shaquille O'Neal, Anfernee "Penny" Hardaway and Grant Hill. He wore the number 8 during both years.

Pippen is a two-time inductee into the Naismith Memorial Basketball Hall of Fame, once for his individual career and once as a member of the "Dream Team", having been simultaneously inducted for both on August 13, 2010. The Bulls retired his number 33 on December 8, 2005. The University of Central Arkansas retired his number 33 on January 21, 2010.

He was formerly married to television personality Larsa Pippen, and is the father of NBA basketball player Scotty Pippen Jr. and college basketball player Justin Pippen.

== Early life ==
Pippen was born on September 25, 1965, in Hamburg, Arkansas, to Ethel (1923–2016) and Preston Pippen (1920–1990), a paper mill worker. He has 11 older siblings. His mother was 6 ft (180 cm) tall and his father was 6 ft 1 in (185 cm), and all of their children were tall, with Scottie Pippen being the tallest. His parents could not afford to send their other children to college.

Pippen's second-oldest brother became paralyzed after an injury in a high school PE class. Six years later, his father suffered a stroke that paralyzed his right side, prevented him from walking, and affected his speech. Playing point guard at Hamburg High School, Pippen led his team to the state playoffs and earned all-conference honors as a senior, but was not offered any college scholarships.

== College career ==
Pippen began his college playing career at the University of Central Arkansas after being discovered by the school's head basketball coach, Don Dyer, as a walk-on. He did not receive much media coverage because Central Arkansas played in the NAIA, while the media focused mainly on NCAA Division I schools. Pippen stood only 6 ft 1 in (1.85 m) tall when he graduated from high school, but experienced a growth spurt while at Central Arkansas and grew to 6 ft 8 in (2.03 m). As a senior, his per game averages of 23.6 points, 10 rebounds, 4.3 assists, and near 60 percent field goal shooting earned him consensus NAIA All-American honors in 1986 and 1987, making him a dominant player in the Arkansas Intercollegiate Conference, drawing the attention of NBA scouts.

== Professional career ==
=== Chicago Bulls (1987–1998) ===
==== Early career (1987–1990) ====
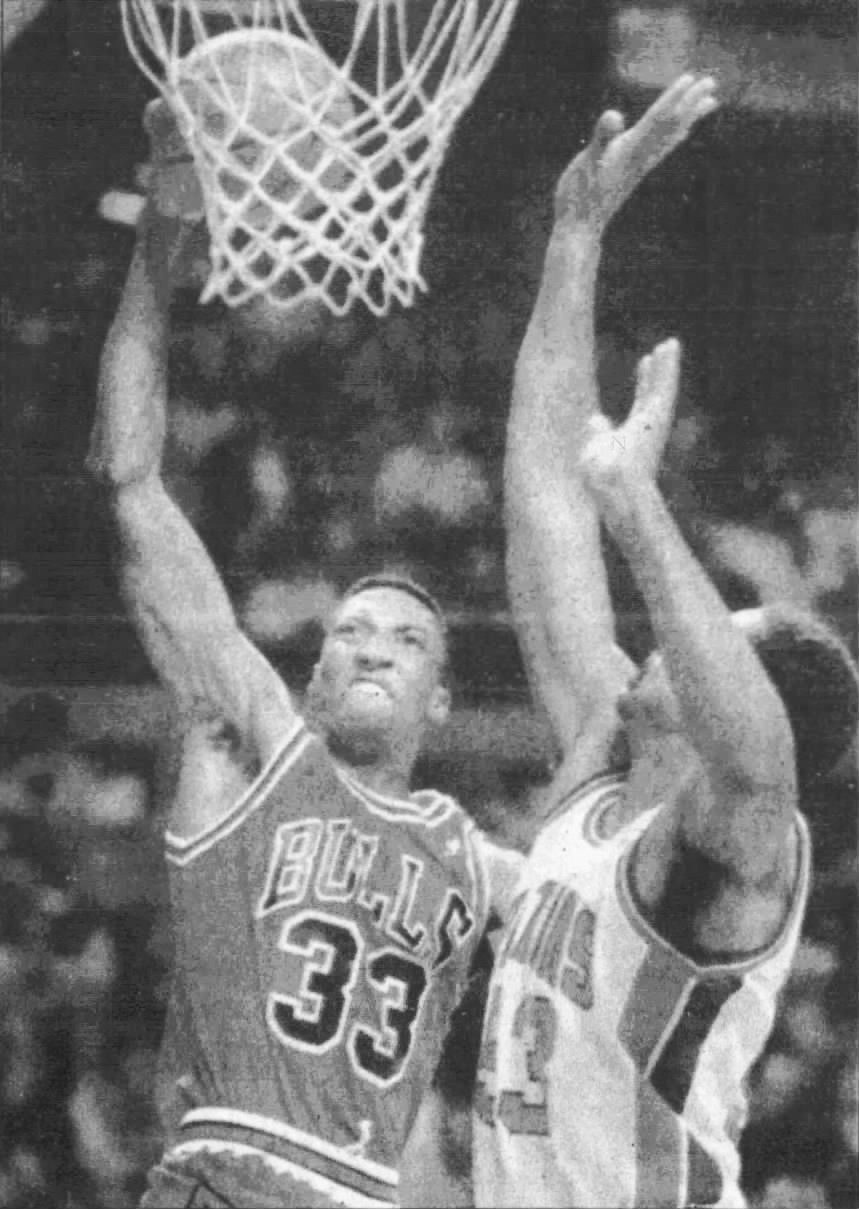
Pippen being guarded by Pistons center James Edwards in December 1988

Having eyed Pippen before the 1987 NBA draft, the Chicago Bulls manufactured a trade with the Seattle SuperSonics that sent Pippen, selected fifth overall, to the Bulls in exchange for the eighth pick, Olden Polynice, and future draft pick options. Pippen became part of Chicago's young forward duo with 6-foot-10-inch (208 cm) power forward Horace Grant (the 10th overall pick in 1987), although both came off the bench during their rookie seasons. Pippen made his NBA debut on November 7, 1987, when the Chicago Bulls opened against the Philadelphia 76ers. He finished with 10 points, two steals, four assists, and one rebound in 23 minutes of play, and the Bulls won 104–94.

With teammate Michael Jordan as a motivational and instructional mentor, Pippen refined his skills and slowly developed many new ones over his career. Jordan and Pippen frequently played one-on-one outside of team practices, simply to hone each other's skills on offense and defense. Pippen claimed the starting small forward position during the 1988 NBA Playoffs, helping the Jordan-led Bulls to reach the conference semifinals for the first time in over a decade. Pippen emerged as one of the league's premier young forwards at the turn of the decade, recording then-career highs in points (16.5 points per game), rebounds (6.7 rebounds per game), and field goal shooting (48.9%), as well as finishing third in the league in steals with 211 during the 1989–1990 season. These feats earned Pippen his debut NBA All-Star selection in 1990.

Pippen continued to improve as the Bulls reached the Eastern Conference Finals in 1989 and 1990. In each season, the Bulls were eliminated by the Detroit Pistons. In the 1990 Eastern Conference Finals, Pippen suffered a severe migraine headache at the start of Game Seven that impacted his play, and he made only one of his ten field goal attempts as the Bulls lost 93–74.

==== The Bulls' first three-peat (1991–1993) ====
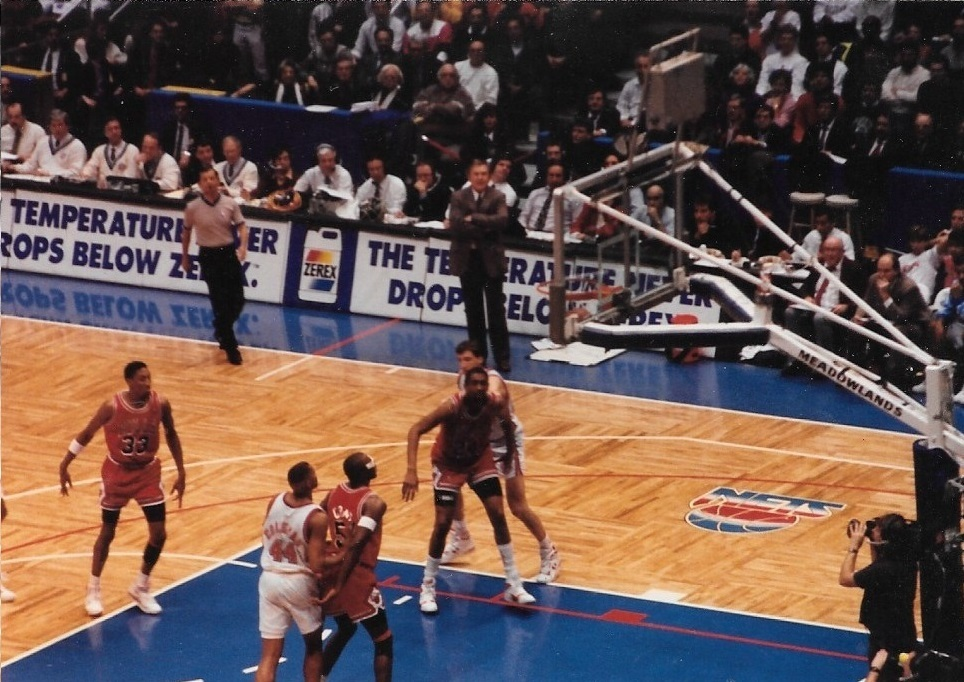
Pippen, at left, on the court in a game on March 28, 1991

In the 1990–91 NBA season, Pippen emerged as the Bulls' primary defensive stopper and a versatile scoring threat in Phil Jackson's triangle offense. Alongside the help of Jordan, Pippen continued to improve his game, especially in shooting from the field. He had his first triple-double on November 23 when the Bulls faced the Los Angeles Clippers as he had 13 points, 12 assists and 13 rebounds in 30 minutes in a 105–97 win. The Bulls finished the season with a record of 61–21. They were first in the Central Division, first in the Eastern Conference and second overall, as the Portland Trail Blazers clinched the first spot. Pippen was second on the team in points per game with 17.8 and steals with 2.4 next to Jordan and he was also second in rebounds per game with 7.3 next to Horace Grant. Pippen led the team in blocks per game with 1.1 and assists per game with 6.2. He ranked fifth overall in the NBA in steals, both for total steals and steals per game. For his efforts in the 1990–91 NBA season Pippen was awarded NBA All-Defensive Second Team honors. The Bulls went on to sweep the two-time defending champions Detroit Pistons in the Eastern Conference Finals, then defeated the Los Angeles Lakers in the 1991 NBA Finals with Pippen defending effectively against Lakers superstar Magic Johnson.

Pippen helped lead the Bulls to their first three-peat, as they won the following two years in 1992 and 1993.

==== Pippen without Jordan (1993–1995) ====
Michael Jordan retired before the 1993–94 season and in his absence Pippen emerged from Jordan's shadow. That year, he earned All-Star Game MVP honors and led the Bulls in scoring, assists, and blocks, and was second in the NBA in steals per game, averaging 22.0 points, 8.7 rebounds, 5.6 assists, 2.9 steals, and 0.8 blocks per game, while shooting 49.1% from the field and a career-best 32% from the 3-point line. For his efforts, he earned the first of three straight All-NBA First Team selections, and he finished third in MVP voting. The Bulls (with key additions of Toni Kukoč, Steve Kerr and Luc Longley) finished the season with 55 wins, only two fewer than the year before.

However, one of the most controversial moments of Pippen's career came in his first year without Jordan. In the 1994 NBA Playoffs, the Eastern Conference Semifinals pitted the Bulls against the New York Knicks, whom the Bulls had dispatched en route to a championship each of the previous three seasons. On May 13, 1994, down 2–0 in the series in Game 3, Bulls coach Phil Jackson needed a big play from his team to have any chance of going on to the conference finals. With 1.8 seconds left and the score tied at 102, Jackson designed the last play for Toni Kukoč, with Pippen instructed to inbound the basketball. Pippen, who had been the Bulls' leader all season long in Jordan's absence, was so angered by Jackson's decision to not let him take the potential game-winner that he refused to leave the bench and re-enter the game when the timeout was over. Although Kukoč did hit the game-winner, a 23-foot (7 m) fadeaway jumper at the buzzer, there was little celebrating by the Bulls, as television cameras caught an unsmiling Phil Jackson storming off the court. "Scottie asked out of the play," Jackson told reporters moments later in the post-game interview.

A key play occurred in Game 5 which changed the outcome of the series. With 2.1 seconds left in the fourth quarter, the Knicks' Hubert Davis attempted a 23-foot (7 m) shot which was defended by Pippen, who was called for a personal foul by referee Hue Hollins, who determined that Pippen made contact with Davis. Television replays indicated that contact was made after Davis had released the ball. Davis successfully made both free throw attempts to assist in the Knicks victory, 87–86, and gave the Knicks a three games to two advantage in the series. The resulting incident was described as the most controversial moment of Hollins' career by Referee magazine. Hollins defended the call after the game saying, "I saw Scottie make contact with his shooting motion. I'm positive there was contact on the shot." Darell Garretson, the league's supervisor of officials and who also officiated in the league, agreed with Hollins and issued a statement, "The perception is that referees should put their whistles in their pockets in the last minutes. But it all comes down to what is sufficient contact. There's an old, old adage that refs don't make those calls in the last seconds. Obviously, you hope you don't make a call that will decide a game. But the call was within the context of how we had been calling them all game." Garretson later changed his stance of the call the next season. Speaking to a Chicago Tribune reporter, Garretson described Hollins' call as "terrible". Chicago head coach Phil Jackson, upset over the outcome of the game, was fined $10,000 for comparing the loss to the gold medal game controversy at the 1972 Summer Olympics.

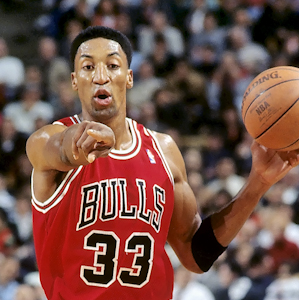
Pippen as a member of the Chicago Bulls in 1995

In Game 6, Pippen made the signature play of his career. Midway in the third quarter, Pippen received the ball during a Bulls fast break, charging toward the basket. As center Patrick Ewing jumped up to defend the shot, Pippen fully extended the ball out, absorbing body contact and a foul from Ewing, and slammed the ball through the hoop with Ewing's hand in his face. Pippen landed several feet away from the basket along the baseline, incidentally walking over a fallen Ewing. He then made taunting remarks to both Ewing and then Spike Lee, who was standing courtside supporting the Knicks, thus receiving a technical foul. This extended the Bulls' lead to 17; they won 93–79.

In Game 7, Pippen scored 20 points and grabbed 16 rebounds, but the Bulls still lost 87–77. The Knicks then proceeded to the NBA Finals, where they lost to the Houston Rockets, also in seven games.

Trade rumors involving Pippen escalated during the 1994 off-season. Jerry Krause, the Bulls' general manager, was reportedly looking to ship Pippen off to the Seattle SuperSonics in exchange for all-star forward Shawn Kemp, moving Toni Kukoč into Pippen's position as starting small forward with Kemp filling in the vacant starting power forward position in place of Horace Grant, a free agent who left the Bulls for the up-and-coming Orlando Magic during the off-season. In January, when asked by Craig Sager as to whether he thought that he would be traded, Pippen replied, "I hope I am". However, Pippen would remain a Bull and those rumors were put to rest once it was announced that Michael Jordan would be returning to the Bulls, late in the 1994–95 season. Badly lacking interior defense and rebounding due to Grant's departure, the Pippen-led Bulls did not play as well in the 1994 season as they had in the season before. For the first time in years, they were in danger of missing the playoffs. The Bulls were just 34–31, prior to Jordan's return for the final 17 games, and Jordan led them to a 13–4 record to close the regular season. Still, Pippen finished the 1994 season leading the Bulls in every major statistical category—points, rebounds, assists, steals, and blocks—joining Dave Cowens (1977–78) as the only players in NBA history to accomplish the feat; Kevin Garnett (2002–03), LeBron James (2008–09), Giannis Antetokounmpo (2016–17) and Nikola Jokić (2021–22) have since matched it.

==== The Bulls' second three-peat (1996–1998) ====
With the return of Michael Jordan and the addition of multiple-time NBA rebound leader Dennis Rodman, the Bulls posted the best regular-season record in NBA history at the time (72–10) in 1995–96 (later surpassed in 2015–16 by the Golden State Warriors) en route to winning their fourth title against the Seattle SuperSonics. Later that year, Pippen became the first person to win an NBA championship and an Olympic gold medal in the same year twice, playing for Team USA at the Atlanta Olympics.

The Bulls opened the 1996–97 NBA season with a 17–1 record and had a league-best record of 42–6 when entering the All-Star break. In November 1996, Pippen set the NBA single-month plus-minus record of 272. Both Pippen and Jordan were selected among the 50 Greatest Players in NBA History as part of the league celebrating its 50th season. The ceremony was held at half-time of the 1997 NBA All-Star Game, which took place on February 9, 1997. Phil Jackson, the Bulls' head coach, was honored as one of the 10 greatest coaches in NBA history, while the 1992 Chicago Bulls Championship team and the 1996 Chicago Bulls Championship team, on which Pippen had played a key role, were selected as two of the Top 10 Teams in NBA History. In the All-Star game itself, Pippen was 4–9 from the field, finishing with 8 points as well as 3 rebounds and 2 assists in 25 minutes of play. The East defeated the West 132–120 and Glen Rice was crowned the All-Star Game MVP.

Pippen scored a career high of 47 points in a 134–123 win over the Denver Nuggets on February 18, going 19–27 from the field and adding 4 rebounds, 5 assists, and 2 steals in 41 minutes of play. On February 23, Pippen was voted "Player of The Week" for the week of February 17, his fifth and final time to receive that honor. As the league entered its final weeks the Bulls lost several of their key players, including Bill Wennington (ruptured tendon in his foot), Dennis Rodman (injured knee), and Toni Kukoč (inflamed sole on his foot). Pippen and Jordan were forced to shoulder a greater load while keeping the team headed towards a playoff appearance. Even with this challenge Chicago finished with a league-best 69–13 record. In the final game of the regular season, Pippen missed a game-winning 3-pointer, leaving the Bulls just short of having an NBA record-setting back-to-back 70-win seasons. For his efforts in the 1996–97 NBA season, Pippen earned NBA All-Defensive First Team honors for the seventh consecutive time as well as All-NBA Second Team honors.

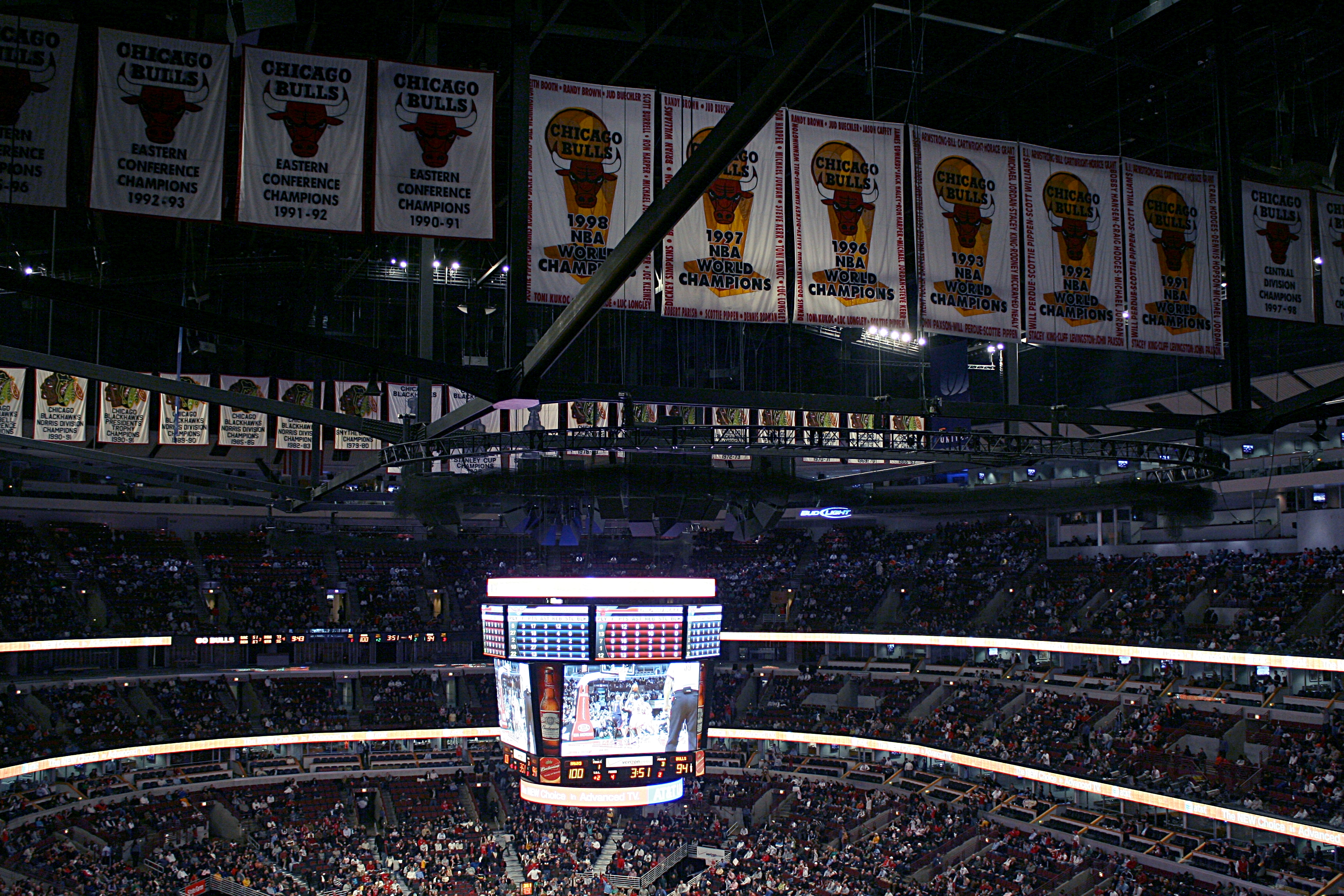
Chicago Bulls championship banners hang in the rafters of the United Center, as seen in 2009

Despite injuring his foot in the Eastern Conference Finals against the Miami Heat, Pippen helped the Bulls to an 84–82 victory over the Utah Jazz in Game 1 of the NBA Finals, which was decided by Jordan's game-winning buzzer beating jumper. One of the highlights of the game was when Jazz star Karl Malone was fouled by Dennis Rodman with 9.2 seconds left and had a chance to give Utah the lead and Pippen famously psyched Malone out, before he stepped up to the line, by saying: "Just remember, the mailman doesn't deliver on Sundays." He missed both free throws. Jordan got the rebound and quickly called a time-out with 7.5 seconds left. With play resumed, Jordan dribbled out most of the clock, then launched a 20-foot (6 m) shot that went in at the buzzer to give Chicago a 1–0 series lead. In Game 3 of the series, Pippen tied a then finals record of seven 3-pointers, but Chicago still lost 104–93. In Game 5, Jordan was battling illness but still managed to dominate the game, with the Bulls winning 90–88. With only seconds remaining and the outcome safely in Chicago's favor, Jordan collapsed into Pippen's arms, creating an iconic image of the pair that has come to symbolize "The Flu Game". During Game 6, Pippen made one of the greatest plays of his career. Trailing by two, after Steve Kerr's jump shot with 5 seconds remaining, the Jazz looked for a final shot to stay alive, but Pippen knocked away Bryon Russell's inbound pass intended for Shandon Anderson and rolled the ball over to Toni Kukoč, who dunked to give the Bulls a 90–86 lead, clinching their fifth championship. Afterwards, Jordan was named Finals MVP for the fifth time.

The 1997–98 season began amid speculation that it would be the last in Chicago for Pippen, Jordan, and Jackson. Pippen had purposefully delayed off-season surgery so that his summer off-season would not be complicated by rehab, pushing his unavailability well into the regular season. In addition to this increasing the load on Jordan to drive the team towards a potential final championship together, it stirred an active effort by Bulls general manager Jerry Krause to trade Pippen, who responded in turn with his own trade demand and rancorous sit-out that extended well beyond his return to playing condition. In spite of this, Pippen ultimately rejoined the team, without any contract renegotiation to pay him what he was worth relative to the then league pay scale, and joined Jordan in another Bulls run to the 1998 NBA Finals, where they again bested the Jazz to win their second three-peat.

=== Houston Rockets (1999) ===
After eleven seasons with the Chicago Bulls, Pippen, the franchise's second-place leader in points, assists, and steals, was traded in January 1999 in a sign-and-trade deal to the Houston Rockets in exchange for Roy Rogers and a second round pick in the 2000 NBA draft (Jake Voskuhl). Pippen's trade to Houston for the lockout-shortened 1998–99 season received much publicity, including his only solo cover of Sports Illustrated. In order for the Rockets to create enough salary-cap room to acquire Pippen, Charles Barkley said that he sacrificed greatly as he signed a five-year $67.2 million contract before the previous season. Pippen's salary was $11 million, almost four times what it had been the previous season with the Chicago Bulls.

Alongside Barkley, his former Olympic teammate and future NBA Hall of Famer, Pippen joined Hakeem Olajuwon, but on-court chemistry problems emerged, especially with Barkley. Pippen had his first triple-double in a 93–87 loss against the Atlanta Hawks as he had 15 points, 10 rebounds and 11 assists in addition to 1 steal in 46 minutes of play. On April 22, 1999, Pippen was detained by police on suspicion of driving while intoxicated. The charges were later dropped due to insufficient evidence. Pippen had his second triple-double of the season in a 106–101 loss against the Los Angeles Clippers, posting 23 points, 10 assists, and 10 rebounds in addition to 6 steals in 45 minutes of play. Despite averaging a career-high in minutes per game with 40.2 and finishing 4th in the NBA in minutes played, Pippen's scoring was down to 14.5 points per game, his lowest since his rookie year, and he made a career-low 43.2 percent of his shots. However, he also averaged his exceptional combination for a small forward of 6.5 rebounds and 5.9 assists per game, and was named to the NBA All-Defensive first team for the 8th time. The Rockets finished the season with a 31–19 record, third in the Midwest Division and fifth in the Western Conference. They faced the Los Angeles Lakers in the first round of the playoffs. In game 3 of the series, Pippen scored 37 points and had 13 rebounds, 4 assists, and 1 block in staving off elimination. The Lakers went on to win the series the following game, defeating Houston 98–88.

Following the season's end and the Rockets' early elimination from the playoffs, Pippen expressed a desire to be traded. Charles Barkley appeared on Up Close and openly criticized Pippen, saying, "For him to want to leave after one year, it disappointed me greatly. The Rockets went out of their way to get Scottie and the fans have treated him well, so I was just disappointed in him." Pippen responded by saying, "I wouldn't give Charles Barkley an apology at gunpoint. He can never expect an apology from me. If anything, he owes me an apology for coming to play with his fat butt." He stated that the main reasons for his departure were Barkley's selfishness and his lack of desire to win. He also expressed the wish to play for his former coach Phil Jackson, who was now coaching the Los Angeles Lakers. Pippen said one of the reasons he wanted to play for Jackson was that he longed to return to the system in which they won six NBA titles together in Chicago. Pippen was traded to the Portland Trail Blazers on October 2, 1999, in exchange for Stacey Augmon, Kelvin Cato, Ed Gray, Carlos Rogers, Brian Shaw and Walt Williams.

=== Portland Trail Blazers (1999–2003) ===
Pippen claimed the starting small forward position with the Portland Trail Blazers in the 1999–2000 NBA season. Playing alongside new stars such as Rasheed Wallace and Steve Smith, Pippen continued to demonstrate his defensive capabilities. On January 3, when the Trail Blazers faced the Bulls, Pippen was honored with a video tribute highlighting his best moments in his 11-year career with the Bulls. Pippen later commented on the tribute by saying, "It was very emotional for me, but I tried to handle it as well as possible realizing I had a game to play. It was something that brought back a lot of memories for me, a lot of things I miss about this city, playing in this arena." Under head coach Mike Dunleavy, the Trail Blazers posted a 59–23 record and clinched the second spot in the Pacific Division and the third spot in the Western Conference. Pippen started in all 82 games that season, averaging 12.5 points per game, 5 assists and 6.3 rebounds per game. In the first round of the 2000 NBA Playoffs, Portland defeated the Minnesota Timberwolves 3 games to 1. Their opponents in the second round were the Utah Jazz. In game 5, with Portland trailing by 2 points, Pippen hit a three pointer with 7.3 seconds remaining. The Jazz fouled Pippen on the next play, and he made one of two free throws to give the Blazers an 81–79 lead. The Trail Blazers won the series 4–1 and advanced to the Western Conference Finals. There, they faced the Los Angeles Lakers, coached by Phil Jackson, Pippen's former coach in Chicago. The series stretched to a deciding game 7, in which the Trail Blazers held a 15-point lead in the 4th quarter. However, led by the All-Star duo of Kobe Bryant and Shaquille O'Neal, the Lakers managed to erase Portland's lead and win the game 89–84 and with that also the series. In the game Pippen struggled, shooting only 30% from the field and totaling 12 points and 10 rebounds. The Lakers proceeded to the 2000 NBA Finals where they faced the Indiana Pacers and were eventually crowned the NBA Champions.

In the 2000–01 NBA season, Pippen played 64 games, starting in 60 of them. He was forced to miss 18 games due to tendinitis in his right elbow, which was his shooting arm. Pippen started being bothered by minor injuries during December but still managed to play. His right arm stiffened after a game with the Boston Celtics on January 8. He missed the next six games, and after a two-point performance in a loss to the Sacramento Kings on January 20, the injury again became too painful for him. He had the elbow examined by several doctors before going into surgery. After undergoing a procedure to remove a bone fragment in his right elbow, he made his return on February 22 against the Utah Jazz and played for the remainder of the season. Pippen finished the season with averages of 11.3 points per game, 4.6 assists and 5.2 rebounds per game. The Trail Blazers finished the season with a 50–32 record, fourth in the Pacific Division and seventh in the Western Conference. They were swept in the first round of the playoffs by the returning and eventual repeat champions, the Los Angeles Lakers.

Pippen played for two more seasons in Portland: the Trail Blazers made the playoffs both years, but were eliminated in the first round each time, in another sweep to the Lakers and in a 7-game series to the Mavericks, respectively. On February 3, 2003, by then 37 years old, Pippen willed the Trail Blazers to a win over the Orlando Magic with 25 points, 17 rebounds, and 7 assists.

=== Return to Chicago (2003–2004) ===
After the 2002–03 season, Pippen left Portland to sign with the Chicago Bulls, where he had begun his NBA career and won six championships. The Bulls' general manager John Paxson pursued Pippen to return to his old team, which had had little success following the breakup of the Bulls dynasty in 1998. The deal was made official on July 20, 2003, as Pippen signed a two-year, $10 million contract with the franchise. Pippen assumed a veteran role on the team in order to guide the young Bulls team, but was faced with numerous injuries throughout the season and was only able to play 23 games, averaging 5.9 points, 3.0 rebounds and 2.2 assists per game. He played the final game of his NBA career against the Seattle SuperSonics on February 2, 2004, scoring two points, with one rebound and three assists in eight minutes of play in a 109–97 loss. The Bulls compiled a 23–59 record, failing to qualify for the playoffs. This marked the first time in Pippen's career that his team did not reach the playoffs. Pippen had been a constant presence in the NBA playoffs prior to this season, reaching the playoffs in 16 straight years (11 with Chicago, 1 with Houston, 4 with Portland). He is second in the NBA in career playoff steals with 395 (LeBron James leads with 445). On October 5, 2004, Pippen announced his retirement.

The Chicago Bulls retired Pippen's jersey number in a ceremony on December 9, 2005. The team played against the Los Angeles Lakers that night and Pippen was reunited with Phil Jackson, Michael Jordan, Dennis Rodman, and Horace Grant during the ceremony. Pippen's 33 joined Michael Jordan's 23, Bob Love's 10, and Jerry Sloan's 4 as the only numbers retired by the Bulls.

In 2007, Pippen had attempted to make an NBA comeback as he expressed that he would like to play for a championship contender in hopes of getting his 7th Championship ring. Pippen had spent the winter working out in Fort Lauderdale, Florida and announced that he was hoping for a late-season return to the league. Dwyane Wade, who was the Finals MVP of the 2006 NBA Finals and the captain of the returning champions, the Miami Heat, liked the idea of Pippen making a comeback and expressed his views on it: "I'm already playing with Payton and Shaq, two guys I used to play with on video games. To add Scottie Pippen to the mix, that would be crazy."

=== European comeback (2008) ===
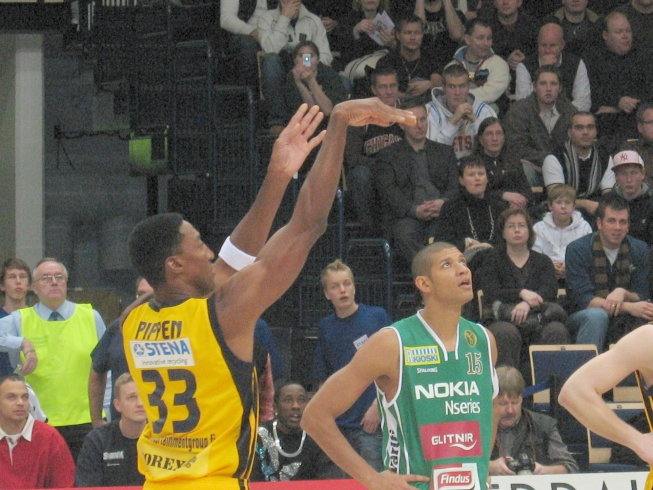
Pippen playing in Finland in 2008

In 2008, Pippen made a brief comeback to professional basketball at age 42. He played two games for top Finnish league team Torpan Pojat (ToPo), and one game for top Swedish league team Sundsvall Dragons. Afterward, Pippen praised the quality of the basketball talent in Sweden and Finland.

== National team career ==
Pippen won two gold medals with the United States men's Olympic basketball team. He was part of the "Dream Team" that qualified via the 1992 Tournament of the Americas and won the tournament at the 1992 Summer Olympics in Barcelona. Pippen and teammate Michael Jordan became the first players to win both an NBA championship and an Olympic gold medal in the same year. Pippen again played for the U.S. men's Olympic basketball team (nicknamed "Dream Team III") at the 1996 Summer Olympics in Atlanta. Pippen wore jersey number 8 for both Olympic games.

== Executive career ==
Pippen returned to the Bulls on July 15, 2010, as a team ambassador. In 2012, he was named senior advisor to Michael Reinsdorf, the Bulls' president and COO.

On April 16, 2020, Pippen stated that he had been dismissed as a public relations ambassador for the Bulls in February. According to NBC Sports Chicago, he and the Bulls could not come to an agreement on compensation and allowing him to keep his role of making regular TV appearances on ESPN's The Jump. He quipped, "I didn't really want it to be out in the public but I'm no longer employed by the Bulls. Probably is a good thing, right? I like to associate myself with winning."

== Player profile ==
Pippen was famed for his defensive abilities, having made the NBA All-Defensive Team ten consecutive years during his career and leading the league in steals in 1994–95. Jackson once described him as a "one-man wrecking crew", capable of guarding anyone from the point guard to the center position. Pippen is one of three players in NBA history (along with Jordan and Olajuwon) to record 200 steals and 100 blocks in a season, and he has the record for second-most career steals in the playoffs (395) behind James. He was skilled at staying in front of his man on defense, and particularly effective as a help defender, with his long arms in traps. He was also capable of chasing down an opposing player in transition to block shots from behind.

On offense, Pippen relied primarily on his athleticism to gain an advantage over his defender; he slashed towards the basket for higher percentage shots. Early in his career, Pippen was not an adept jump shooter; he struggled when shooting directly on a line to the basket. He favored shooting his jump shots—mid-range and three-pointers—on an angle. He could regularly bank the ball off the backboard into the basket. He honed his jump shot over the course of his career and became more effective at scoring from distance later in his career.

== Legacy ==
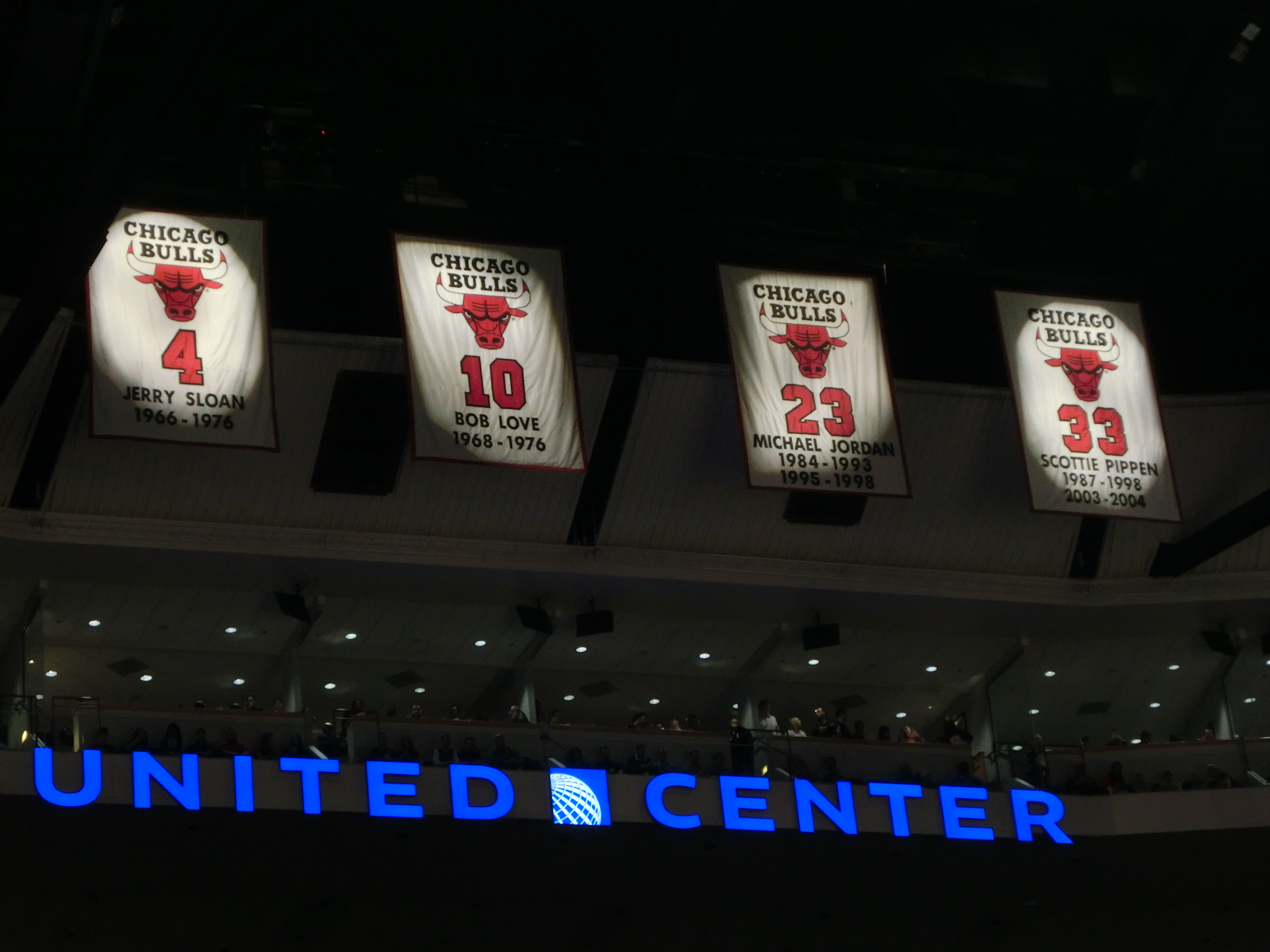
Pippen's retired #33 jersey (far right) hanging in the rafters of the United Center

Pippen is remembered as one of the greatest basketball defenders of all time as well as one of the most versatile and agile players overall. In 2022, to commemorate the NBA's 75th Anniversary The Athletic ranked their top 75 players of all time and named Pippen as the 32nd greatest player in NBA history. Much like fellow Bulls teammate Michael Jordan, he provided tenacious on-the-ball perimeter defense, tough interior defense, and significant talent as a help defender. Gifted with extraordinary athleticism, even when compared with other professional athletes, Pippen demonstrated substantial skill in multiple areas well-suited for basketball.

Pippen's unusually long arms (with a 2.2 m (88 in) wingspan) and jumping agility helped him clog the passing lanes on defense, block shots from behind on players that had managed to pass him by, grab seemingly out-of-reach rebounds, make unusual plays in mid-air, and make passes around defenders that most players are physically unable to make. He often led the Bulls in assists and blocks as a result. He was also known as a selfless player, and his team-focused approach to the game was a key component in the Bulls' championship wins. His career assists total of 6,135 (5.2 per game), which was 23rd all-time among all players when he retired, is a testament to that approach.

Pippen's intense work ethic and athletic physique gave him the ability to consistently make highlight-reel plays, such as applying defensive intensity, forcing a turnover, stealing the ball, and starting a one-man fast break that he would finish with a thunderous slam dunk. As he himself has attested, he and Jordan would compete to see who could force more turnovers and produce more offense from defense in each game (fast-break points). During the 1990 Slam Dunk Contest, Pippen exhibited his leaping ability with a dunk from the free-throw line. He was an athletic finisher at the rim, both with slam dunks and a skillful finger roll that he added to his skill set over time. He was also a prolific perimeter shooter for the time, taking about 3,000 and making almost 1,000 three-pointers in his career.

Several NBA players, including Jordan, Jason Kidd, and Karl Malone have placed Pippen in their all-time starting lineups.

In order to commemorate the 20th anniversary of their first NBA Championship in 1991, the Chicago Bulls organization honored the 1991 Chicago Bulls Championship team in a ceremony during halftime of a game versus the Utah Jazz on March 12, 2011. Pippen and Michael Jordan both attended and participated in the celebration, where they were reunited with their former teammates John Paxson, Horace Grant, Stacey King, Craig Hodges, Will Perdue, Scott Williams, Cliff Levingston, Dennis Hopson and Assistant Coach Johnny Bach. Former head coach Phil Jackson did not participate but gave a speech via a video message. Former Bulls' broadcaster Jim Durham emceed the halftime ceremony.

On March 17, 2011, the Chicago Bulls organization announced that they would honor Pippen with a bronze statue to be placed inside of the Bulls' home arena, the United Center. He expressed his gratitude by saying: "Words really can't express my feelings. It's something you dream of as a kid growing up, but you can never foresee those childhood fantasies becoming reality. You see statues of individuals who have done great things and made their mark on history, but as a basketball player, you never really think about arriving at this point. It's an amazing honor for the Chicago Bulls to do this for me." The statue was unveiled on April 7, 2011, during a halftime ceremony of a game between the Chicago Bulls and the Boston Celtics.

== Filmography ==
- In 1996, Pippen appeared on the TV show ER in the season 2 episode "Baby Shower".
- In 1998, he was featured in a segment of the documentary film Hardwood Heroes. The film also features Clyde Drexler, Glen Rice, and others.
- In 1998, amongst other NBA players, he appeared as a cameo in Spike Lee's sports drama film He Got Game.
- In 2009, he appeared in the movie Midgets vs. Mascots.
- In 2010, he voiced an animated version of himself in the "Love Rollercoaster" episode of The Cleveland Show.
- In 2011, he guest starred alongside his then-wife, Larsa Pippen, who appeared as an original main cast member on the Bravo reality series, The Real Housewives of Miami. Departing the show after its first season, Larsa rejoined the series in 2021 for the rebooted fourth season.
- In 2013, he was featured during a segment, in volume 5 of a documentary series by NBA TV, titled NB90s. The series consisted of five half-hour episodes and depicted the league and its players during the 1990s.
- In 2015, he appeared as himself in episode 11 of the TV show Fresh Off the Boat.
- In 2015, he made a cameo appearance in season 3, episode 23 of the TV show Chicago Fire.
- In 2017, he appeared as himself in the season 2 episode "Birdwatching" of the TV show Lethal Weapon.
- In 2020, he appeared as himself in the ESPN documentary miniseries The Last Dance, which revolved primarily around the 1997–98 Chicago Bulls season. While the series was critically acclaimed, Pippen was reportedly "wounded and disappointed" by his characterization, though he did not make any public remarks during its airing. He stated it was "more about Michael trying to uplift himself and to be glorified" and disclosed that Jordan agreed when Pippen spoke to him about not being pleased with his portrayal in the docuseries.
- In 2021, he voiced a fictionalised version of himself in American Dad.

== Personal life ==
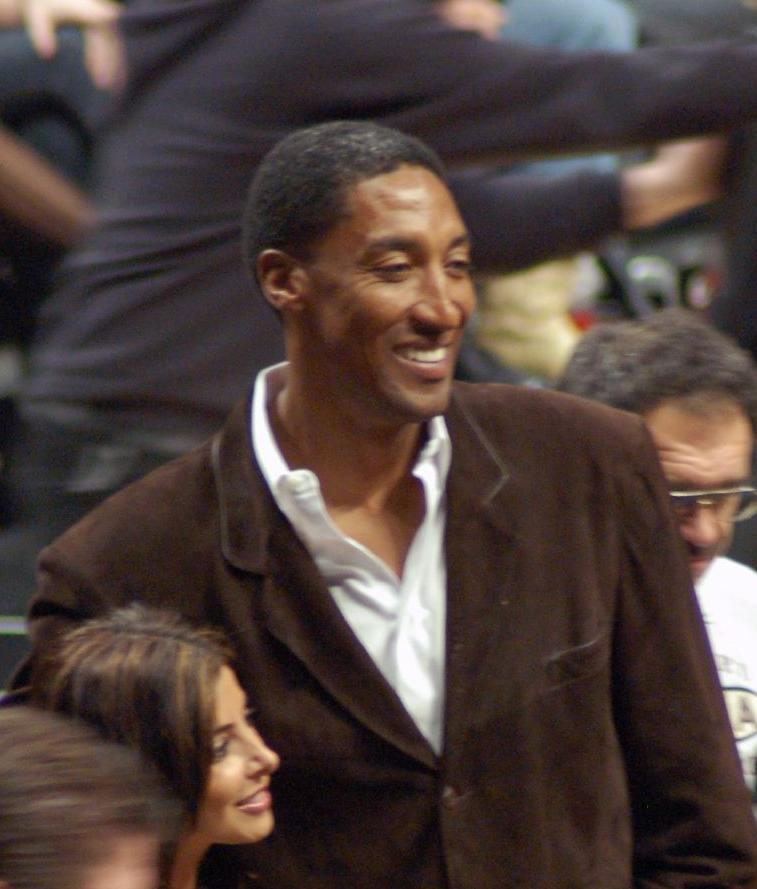
Pippen and then-wife Larsa in December 2006

Although his given name is spelled "Scotty" on his birth certificate, Pippen usually goes by "Scottie".

Pippen has been married twice. He married Karen McCollum in 1988. The couple had a son, Antron Pippen (1987 – 2021), before divorcing in 1990.

Pippen fathered twin daughters, Taylor and Tyler Roby, born in 1994, with his former girlfriend, Sonya Roby. Tyler Roby died nine days after birth.

Pippen also fathered a daughter, born in 1995, with his former fiancée, Yvette De Leon.

Pippen married Larsa Pippen, who later became a Real Housewives of Miami star, in 1997. The couple had four children: Scotty Jr., Preston, Justin, and Sophia. Though Pippen filed for divorce in 2016, he later withdrew his divorce petition. Larsa Pippen filed for divorce in 2018, and the divorce was finalized in late 2021. Their first child, Scotty Pippen Jr., born in 2000, is a professional basketball player for the Memphis Grizzlies of the NBA. Their second child, Preston Pippen, born in 2002, used to play basketball in high school but opted not to continue the sport in college, instead studying entrepreneurship and business, graduating with a degree in business from Loyola Marymount University. Their third child, Justin Pippen, born in 2005, currently plays for the Ohio State Buckeyes of the Big Ten Conference. He previously played for the California Golden Bears and the Michigan Wolverines. Their fourth child, Sophia Pippen, born in 2008, is a model and also acts and dances, having previously appeared on the first season of Dancing with the Stars: Juniors in 2018.

Pippen's nephew, Kavion Pippen, is a professional basketball player for the Maine Celtics of the NBA G League.

Shortly after retiring, Pippen learned that his financial adviser Robert Lunn, who he claimed had been recommended by the Bulls, was under investigation for bank fraud. Pippen had invested over $20 million through Lunn, who was sentenced to three years in prison in March 2016 on multiple fraud counts; Lunn was found to have forged Pippen's signature on a $1.4 million loan that Lunn used to pay off personal debts.

=== Legal issues ===
On July 11, 2013, Camran Shafighi filed a $4 million lawsuit against Pippen in Los Angeles Superior Court over an incident that had occurred on June 23 at the restaurant Nobu in Malibu, California. Shafighi said that he was physically attacked by Pippen after taking pictures of Pippen inside and outside the restaurant, and was then taken to a hospital. On August 27, the district attorney's office announced that charges would not be filed against Pippen.

== Career statistics ==
=== NBA ===
Legend
GP	Games played	GS	Games started	MPG	Minutes per game
FG%	Field goal percentage	3P%	3-point field goal percentage	FT%	Free throw percentage
RPG	Rebounds per game	APG	Assists per game	SPG	Steals per game
BPG	Blocks per game	PPG	Points per game	**Bold**	Career high
†	Won an NBA championship	*	Led the league

==== Regular season ====
Year	Team	GP	GS	MPG	FG%	3P%	FT%	RPG	APG	SPG	BPG	PPG
1987–88	Chicago	79	0	20.9	.463	.174	.576	3.8	2.1	1.2	.7	7.9
1988–89	Chicago	73	56	33.1	.476	.273	.668	6.1	3.5	1.9	.8	14.4
1989–90	Chicago	**82**	**82**	38.4	.489	.250	.675	6.7	5.4	2.6	**1.2**	16.5
1990–91†	Chicago	**82**	**82**	36.8	**.520**	.309	.706	7.3	6.2	2.4	1.1	17.8
1991–92†	Chicago	**82**	**82**	38.6	.506	.200	.760	7.7	**7.0**	1.9	1.1	21.0
1992–93†	Chicago	81	81	38.6	.473	.237	.663	7.7	6.3	2.1	.9	18.6
1993–94	Chicago	72	72	38.3	.491	.320	.660	**8.7**	5.6	**2.9**	.8	**22.0**
1994–95	Chicago	79	79	38.2	.480	.345	.716	8.1	5.2	**2.9***	1.1	21.4
1995–96†	Chicago	77	77	36.7	.463	**.374**	.679	6.4	5.9	1.7	.7	19.4
1996–97†	Chicago	**82**	**82***	37.7	.474	.368	.701	6.5	5.7	1.9	.6	20.2
1997–98†	Chicago	44	44	37.5	.447	.318	.777	5.2	5.8	1.8	1.0	19.1
1998–99	Houston	50*	50*	**40.2**	.432	.340	.721	6.5	5.9	2.0	.7	14.5
1999–00	Portland	**82**	**82***	33.5	.451	.327	.717	6.3	5.0	1.4	.5	12.5
2000–01	Portland	64	60	33.3	.451	.344	.739	5.2	4.6	1.5	.6	11.3
2001–02	Portland	62	60	32.2	.411	.305	.774	5.2	5.9	1.6	.6	10.6
2002–03	Portland	64	58	29.9	.444	.286	**.818**	4.3	4.5	1.6	.4	10.8
2003–04	Chicago	23	6	17.9	.379	.271	.630	3.0	2.2	.9	.4	5.9
Career		1,178	1,053	34.9	.473	.326	.704	6.4	5.2	2.0	.8	16.1
All-Star		7	6	24.7	.442	.318	.625	5.6	2.4	2.4	.9	12.1

==== Playoffs ====
Year	Team	GP	GS	MPG	FG%	3P%	FT%	RPG	APG	SPG	BPG	PPG
1988	Chicago	10	6	29.4	.465	.500	.714	5.2	2.4	.8	.8	10.0
1989	Chicago	17	17	36.4	.462	.393	.640	7.6	3.9	1.4	.9	13.1
1990	Chicago	15	14	40.8	.495	.323	.710	7.2	5.5	2.1	**1.3**	19.3
1991†	Chicago	17	17	41.4	**.504**	.235	.792	8.9	5.8	2.5	1.1	21.6
1992†	Chicago	**22**	**22**	40.9	.468	.250	.761	8.8	**6.7**	1.9	1.1	19.5
1993†	Chicago	19	19	41.5	.465	.176	.638	6.9	5.6	2.2	.7	20.1
1994	Chicago	10	10	38.4	.434	.267	.885	8.3	4.6	2.4	.7	**22.8**
1995	Chicago	10	10	39.6	.443	.368	.676	8.6	5.8	1.4	1.0	17.8
1996†	Chicago	18	18	41.2	.390	.286	.638	8.5	5.9	2.6	.9	16.9
1997†	Chicago	19	19	39.6	.417	.345	.791	6.8	3.8	1.5	.9	19.2
1998†	Chicago	21	21	39.8	.415	.228	.679	7.1	5.2	2.1	1.0	16.8
1999	Houston	4	4	**43.0**	.329	.273	.808	**11.8**	5.5	1.8	.8	18.3
2000	Portland	16	16	38.4	.419	.300	.743	7.1	4.3	2.0	.4	14.9
2001	Portland	3	3	39.0	.421	.176	.667	5.7	2.3	**2.7**	.7	13.7
2002	Portland	3	3	33.0	.409	**.545**	.875	9.3	5.7	1.3	.7	16.3
2003	Portland	4	1	18.8	.409	.333	**1.000**	2.8	3.3	.0	.0	5.8
Career		208	200	39.0	.444	.303	.724	7.6	5.0	1.9	.9	17.5

=== College ===
Year	Team	GP	GS	MPG	FG%	3P%	FT%	RPG	APG	SPG	BPG	PPG
1983–84	Central Arkansas	20	1	—	.456	—	.684	3.0	.7	.4	.4	4.3
1984–85	Central Arkansas	19	19	—	.564	—	.676	9.2	1.6	1.8	1.2	18.5
1985–86	Central Arkansas	29	29	—	.556	—	.686	9.2	3.5	2.3	.6	19.8
1986–87	Central Arkansas	25	25	—	.592	.575	.719	10.0	4.3	3.1	1.4	23.6

== Career achievements ==
- 21 career triple-doubles (17 regular season, four playoffs)
- Led the league in steals (232) and steals per game (2.94) in 1994–95.
- His 10 NBA All-Defensive honors and 8 NBA All-Defensive First Team honors are one shy of the NBA record.
- Six-time NBA champion
- Member of the Olympic gold medal-winning USA Men's National Basketball Teams in 1992 ("Dream Team I", Barcelona, Spain) and 1996 ("Dream Team III", Atlanta, USA)
- Selected in 1996 as one of the "50 Greatest Players in NBA History"
- Elected to the Naismith Memorial Basketball Hall of Fame in 2010. The 1992 Olympic Basketball "Dream Team", of which he was a member, was also elected to the Hall of Fame in 2010.
- Pippen is one of two NBA players known to have recorded 5 steals and 5 blocks in a playoff game, which he did against the Detroit Pistons on May 19, 1991. Hakeem Olajuwon performed the feat twice.
- Pippen is also one of three non-guards in NBA history to have a season of more than 200 steals. The other players are Rick Barry in 1974–75 and Hakeem Olajuwon in 1988–89. Pippen is the only non-guard to do this on more than one occasion. He did it in 1989–90, 1993–94 and 1994–95.
- Elected in 2021 to the NBA 75th Anniversary Team.
- Holds the NBA single-month plus-minus record (272)

== See also ==
- List of NBA career assists leaders
- List of NBA career minutes played leaders
- List of NBA career personal fouls leaders
- List of NBA career playoff 3-point scoring leaders
- List of NBA career playoff assists leaders
- List of NBA career playoff free throw scoring leaders
- List of NBA career playoff games played leaders
- List of NBA career playoff rebounding leaders
- List of NBA career playoff scoring leaders
- List of NBA career playoff steals leaders
- List of NBA career playoff triple-double leaders
- List of NBA career playoff turnovers leaders
- List of NBA career steals leaders
- List of NBA career turnovers leaders
- List of NBA players with most championships
- List of NBA single-game steals leaders
- List of NBA single-season steals per game leaders
- Slam City with Scottie Pippen, a 1994 video game

== Notes ==
- ^{a} NBA.com has listed Pippen at both 6 ft 7 in (2.01 m) and 6 ft 8 in (2.03 m).
