= Jeremy Sparks =

American bullfighter (born 1977)

Jeremy Sparks (born May 31, 1977) is an American former professional rodeo bullfighter and Professional Rodeo Cowboy Association (PRCA) member, Cheyenne Frontier Days Rodeo Hall of Fame member, and author of Go West - 10 Principles that Guided My Cowboy Journey.

== Early life ==
Sparks was born in Helena, Arkansas, to Elmer and Claudie Sparks. He has two brothers, Jeff and Jay Sparks. In 1989, his family moved from Marvell, Arkansas to Fountain Hill, Arkansas. It was there he had a God-given dream to pursue rodeo bullfighting. While only 14 years old, he dedicated himself to pursuing the sport and was mentored by champion bullfighter Donny Sparks. Two months after graduating from Fountain Hill High, Jeremy received an electric shock while working on a farm, and his rodeo plans were temporarily derailed. While originally planning to attend McNeese State University on a rodeo scholarship, the accident forced him to withdraw and instead enroll at the University of Central Arkansas in Conway. Sparks pledged Pi Kappa Alpha in the Spring 1996 semester. After three years of recovering from the electric shock, Jeremy returned to rodeo. Sparks joined the University of Arkansas-Monticello rodeo team where he competed in the team roping and calf roping events of the National Intercollegiate Rodeo Association. In addition, he received Bachelors in Speech Communication and Rhetoric. He served as a bullfighter at amateur and collegiate events and trained under World Champion Bullfighter Mike Matt.

== Career ==
In September 2000, while still a student at UAM, Sparks applied for and received his membership to the Professional Rodeo Cowboys Association (PRCA). In May 2001, he graduated magna cum laude with a degree in communications. After the September 11, 2001 terrorist attacks, Sparks enlisted in the Air Force and went on to earn his commission in December 2001. In March 2002, he was invited by the South Korean Minister of Tourism to perform an exhibition bullfight at the famed Cheongdo International Bullfighting Festival in Cheongdo, South Korea. Soon after his return, he was contracted by the Cheyenne Frontier Days rodeo to fight bulls at the 2002 event on Military Appreciation Day. He went on to establish a legacy at CFD, working the rodeo nine times and was inducted into the Class of 2013 CFD Hall of Fame; the youngest person ever honored.

He is a 5-time bullfighter for the College National Finals Rodeo (CNFR ) in Casper, Wyoming, and worked PRCA Circuit Final Rodeos on both the East and West Coasts.

During his rodeo career, he was appointed Case 05-195 and represented the United States Air Force as the only professional bullfighter endorsed by the Pentagon in the history of the USAF. He was a Wrangler endorsee, an ad spokesman for Bresnan Communications, and featured by Mutual of Omaha in the 2010 Aha Moment TV commercial campaign.

In 2008, he appeared on Pressure Cook with Chef Ralph Pagano and later on the Power of 10 with Drew Carey.

Sparks retired from professional rodeo in 2010.

In 2016, he contracted with Elevate Publishing to publish his story, Go West describing the ten lessons that he learned in route to a CFD Hall of Fame career.

== Personal life ==
Sparks is married to Jamie Jordan. He is the father of three boys and currently resides in northwest Arkansas.
