= Hamburg School District (Arkansas) =

School district in Arkansas

Location
- 202 East Parker Street; Hamburg, Arkansas 71646 United States
- Coordinates: 33°13′26″N 91°47′47″W

District information
- Type: Public (government funded)
- Grades: PK-12
- Superintendent: Nathan M. Sullivan
- NCES District ID: 0500042

Students and staff
- Students: 2,070
- Teachers: 147.03 (on FTE basis)
- Athletic conference: 3A Region 7 (2012–14)

Other information
- Website: www.hsdlions.org

Hamburg School District is a public school district headquartered in the S. P. Portis Administration Building in Hamburg, Arkansas, United States. The district is one of three school districts based in Ashley County, Arkansas and operates four schools serving the following rural, fringe communities in Ashley, Drew, and Chicot counties. Communities served by the district include Hamburg, Fountain Hill, Parkdale, Portland, Wilmot, and a section of North Crossett.

As of 2010–11 school year, the district has 2,070 students and 147.03 classroom teachers (on full-time equivalent basis) and a student/teacher ratio of 14.08. As of 2010 the district is the second largest in geographic size in Arkansas as it has 772 square miles (2,000 km^{2}) of area.

As a result of a series of consolidations with the Portland, Wilmot, Parkdale, and Fountain Hill school districts, junior high and high school students from these communities travel to Hamburg for classes. The former Parkdale Elementary School is closed, and the school board has approved the transportation of Fountain Hill’s elementary students to Hamburg beginning with the 2006–07 school year. Local school officials have made plans to open a cooperative alternative school on the Fountain Hill campus.

== History ==
The following school districts merged into the Hamburg school district: Portland School District on July 1, 1984, Wilmot School District on July 1, 1986, Parkdale School District on July 1, 1994, and Fountain Hill School District on July 1, 2004.

== Schools ==
Secondary schools include:

- Hamburg High School (1119 South Main St, Hamburg)—Grades 9 through 12.
- Hamburg Middle School (412 Serrett St, Hamburg)—Grades 6 through 8.

Early childhood education and elementary education is provided at these facilities with their locations (in parentheses):

- Portland Elementary School (314 Hwy 160 East, Portland)—Grades PK through 5.
- Noble/Allbritton Elementary School (501 East Lincoln St, Hamburg)—Grades PK through 5.
  - Previously two separate schools: Noble Elementary School and Allbritton Upper Elementary School

Closed:

- Wilmot Elementary School (2764 Hwy 165 South, Wilmot)—Grades PK through 5.
  - Circa 1996 the school had 100 students; circa 2016 this was down to 42. Around that time the district board decided to close the school citing the lower enrollment and financial concerns. A party filed a lawsuit against the district in response to the closure.

== See also ==
- List of school districts in Arkansas
