= Dean House (Portland, Arkansas) =

Historic house in Arkansas, United States

- U.S. National Register of Historic Places
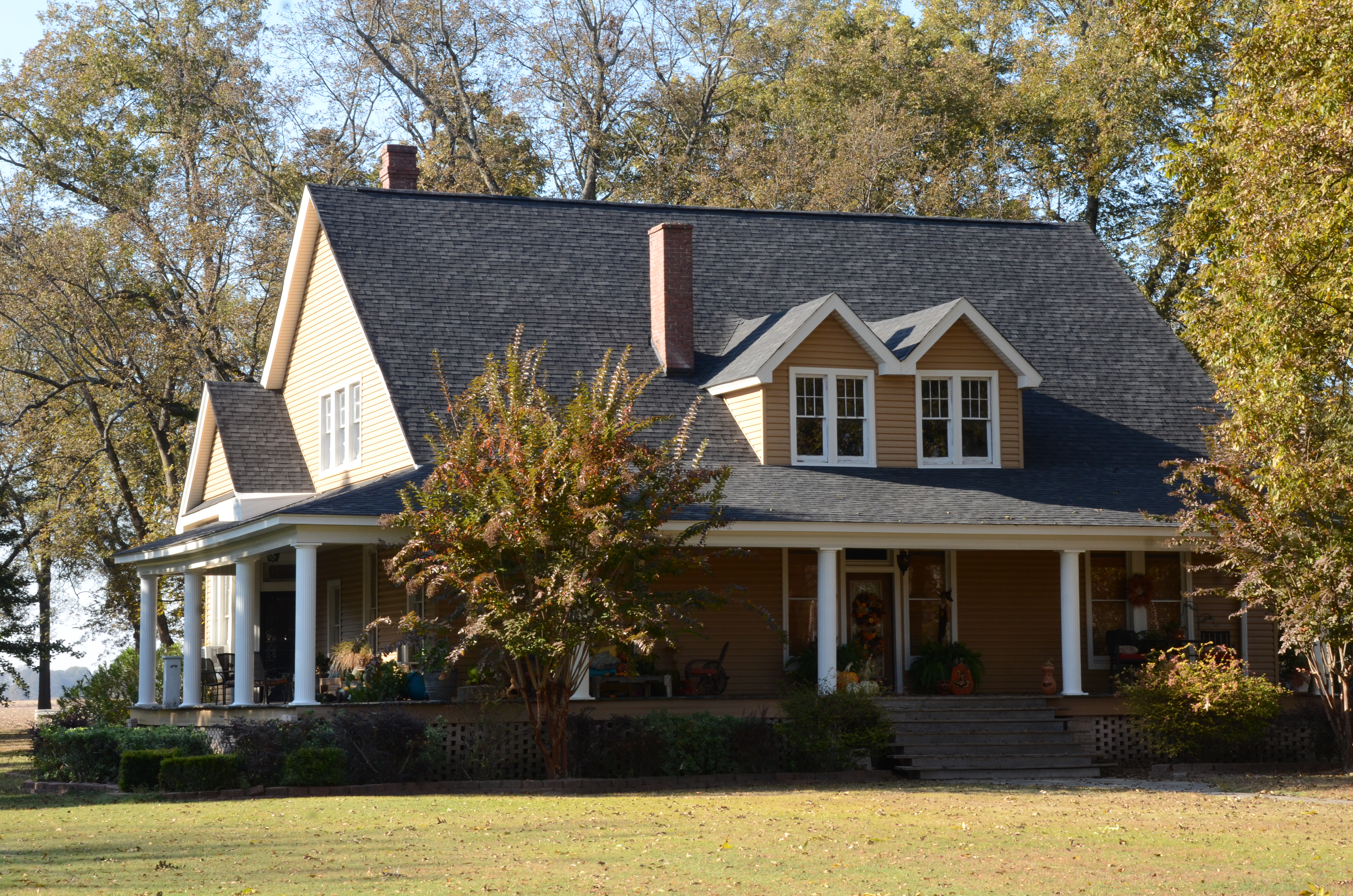

- Location within Arkansas Location within the United States
- Location: Off US 165, Portland, Arkansas
- Coordinates: 33°14′22″N 91°30′46″W
- Area: less than one acre
- Built: c. 1910
- Architect: Charles L. Thompson
- Architectural style: Louisiana Raised Cottage
- MPS: Thompson, Charles L., Design Collection TR
- NRHP reference No.: 82000797
- Added to NRHP: December 22, 1982

The Dean House is a historic house off U.S. Route 165 in Portland, Arkansas. The 1 1/2-story house was designed by architect Charles L. Thompson and built c. 1910. Stylistically, it is a Creole cottage, a simple rectangular shape mounted in a foundation with brick piers. The roof extends over a wraparound porch, which is supported by Tuscan columns. The roof is pierced by a pair of gabled dormers that are decorated with fish-scale shingles.

The house was listed on the National Register of Historic Places in 1982.

== See also ==
- Pugh House (Portland, Arkansas), another Thompson-designed house next door
- National Register of Historic Places listings in Ashley County, Arkansas
