= Pugh House (Portland, Arkansas) =

Historic house in Arkansas, United States

- U.S. National Register of Historic Places
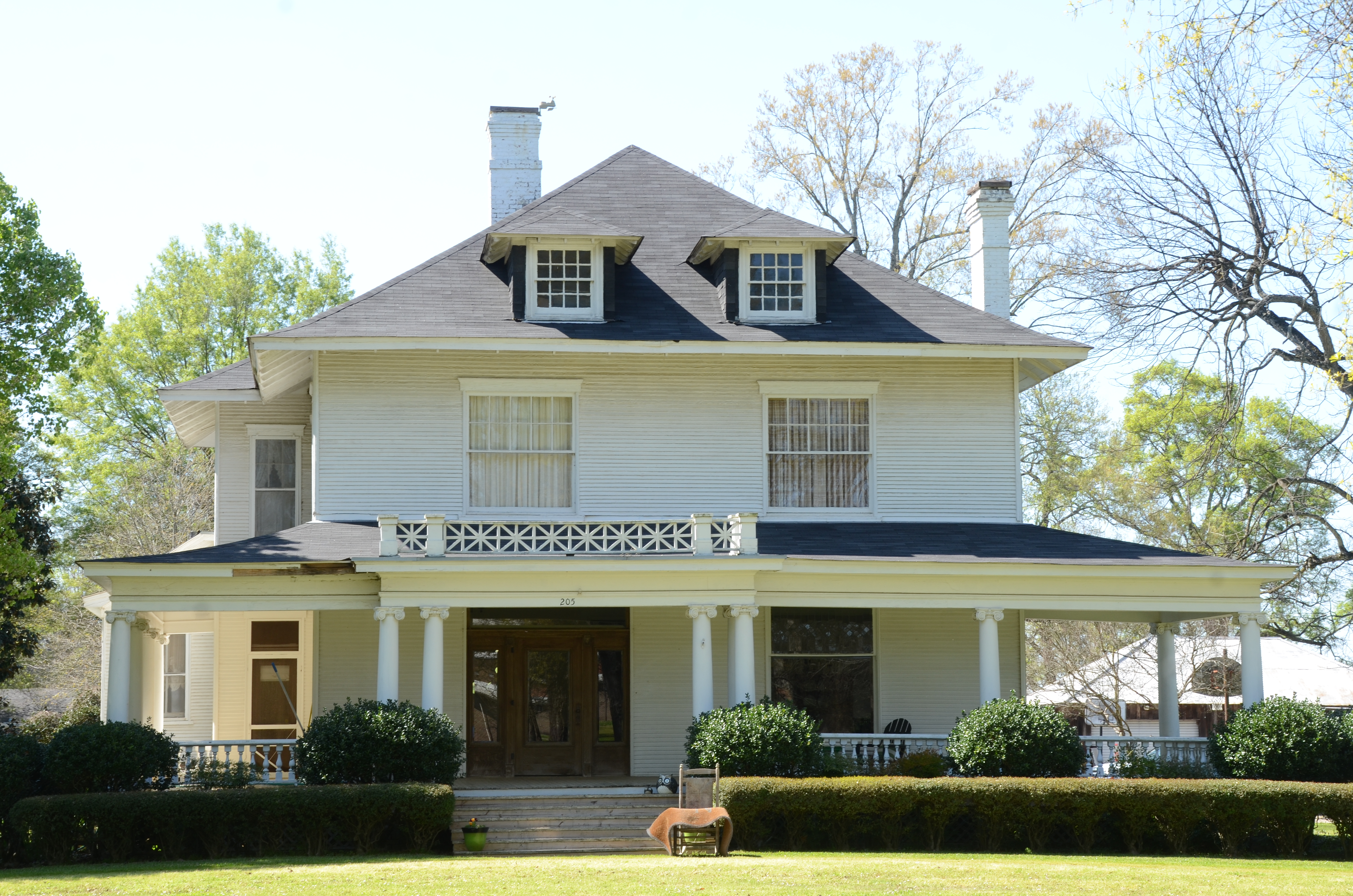

- Location within Arkansas Location within the United States
- Location: Off US 165, Portland, Arkansas
- Coordinates: 33°14′19″N 91°30′48″W
- Built: 1905-1907
- Architect: Charles L. Thompson
- Architectural style: Classical Revival
- MPS: Thompson, Charles L., Design Collection TR
- NRHP reference No.: 82000798
- Added to NRHP: December 22, 1982

The Pugh House is a historic house on US Route 65 in Portland, Arkansas. The house was built c. 1905 to a design by architect Charles L. Thompson. It is a basic Foursquare house that has been elaborated by a hip roof with flared eaves, and a wraparound porch supported by Ionic columns and decorated with a neo-classical balustrade.

The house was listed on the National Register of Historic Places in 1982.

== See also ==
- Dean House (Portland, Arkansas), next door
- National Register of Historic Places listings in Ashley County, Arkansas
