= Hamburg High School (Arkansas) =

Location
- 1119 South Main Street; Hamburg, Arkansas 71646; United States
- Coordinates: 33°12′56″N 91°47′53″W

Information
- School type: Public comprehensive
- Status: Open
- School district: Hamburg School District
- CEEB code: 040995
- NCES School ID: 050004201281
- Teaching staff: 41.55 (on FTE basis)
- Grades: 9–12
- Enrollment: 511 (2023-2024)
- Student to teacher ratio: 12.30
- Education system: ADE Smart Core
- Classes offered: Regular, Advanced Placement (AP)
- Colors: Purple and white
- Athletics conference: 4A Region 7
- Mascot: Lion
- Team name: Hamburg Lions
- Accreditation: ADE
- USNWR ranking: No. 14 (AR); No. 1737 (USA)
- Communities served: Hamburg, Fountain Hill, Parkdale, Portland, Wilmot, and a section of North Crossett
- Feeder to: Hamburg Middle School
- Affiliation: Arkansas Activities Association
- Website: hhs.hsdlions.org

Hamburg High School is a comprehensive public high school for students in grades 9 through 12 located in Hamburg, Arkansas, United States. Since 2004, Hamburg High School is the only high school of the Hamburg School District.

The district serves sections of Ashley, Drew, and Chicot counties. Communities served by the district, and therefore the school, include Hamburg, Fountain Hill, Parkdale, Portland, Wilmot, and a section of North Crossett.

== Academics ==
The assumed course of study follows the Smart Core curriculum developed by the Arkansas Department of Education (ADE), which requires students complete at least 22 units prior to graduation. Students complete regular coursework and exams and may take Advanced Placement (AP) courses and exam with the opportunity to receive college credit.

In 2012, Hamburg High School was nationally recognized as a Silver Medalist and the No. 1737 (national rank) and No. 14 (state rank) in the Best High Schools Report developed by U.S. News & World Report.

== Athletics ==
The Hamburg High School athletic emblem (mascot) is the lion with purple and white serving as the school colors.

The Hamburg Lions compete in interscholastic activities within the 4A Classification administered by the Arkansas Activities Association. The Lions play within the 4A Region 8 Conference. Hamburg fields varsity teams in football, golf (boys/girls), basketball (boys/girls), cross country (boys/girls), cheer, bowling (boys/girls), baseball, fastpitch softball, tennis (boys/girls), track and field (boys/girls).

== Notable people ==
The following are notable people associated with Hamburg High School. If the person was a Hamburg High School student, the number in parentheses indicates the year of graduation; if the person was a faculty or staff member, that person's title and years of association are included:

- Stevi Perry—American beauty queen; Miss Teen USA 2008.
- Kavion Pippen (2015)—basketball player
- Scottie Pippen (1983)—Hall of Fame professional basketball player; 6x NBA Champion.
- Brooke Stoehr (1998)—Former Northwestern State Lady Demons basketball head coach and current Louisiana Tech University Lady Techsters head coach
