= Lumber (disambiguation) =

Lumber is processed wood in North American English, corresponding to timber in the rest of the English speaking world.

Lumber may also refer to:

- Lumber room, a room to store currently un-needed furniture

== Places ==
=== Norway ===
- Lumber (Kristiansand), a neighbourhood in the city of Kristiansand

=== United States ===
- Lumber, Arkansas, an unincorporated community in Arkansas
- Lumber City, Georgia, a city in Telfair County, Georgia
- Lumber, West Virginia, an unincorporated community in West Virginia
- Lumber River, a river in North Carolina
- Lumber Bridge, North Carolina, a town in Robeson County, North Carolina
- Lumber Township, Pennsylvania, a township in Pennsylvania

== See also ==
- Lumber City (disambiguation)
