= Arkansas Highway 344 (1973–1978) =

Former state highway in Arkansas, United States

Highway 344

Route information
- Maintained by AHTD
- Length: 8.00 mi (12.87 km)
- Existed: May 23, 1973–June 29, 1978

Major junctions
- West end: AR 98 at Atlanta
- East end: Atlanta Road

Location
- Country: United States
- State: Arkansas

Highway system
- Arkansas Highway System; Interstate; US; State; Business; Spurs; Suffixed; Scenic; Heritage

Highway 344 (AR 344, Ark. 344, and Hwy. 344) is a former east–west state highway in Columbia County, Arkansas. Between 1973 and 1978, the county road carried a state highway designation and was maintained by the Arkansas State Highway and Transportation Department (AHTD).

== Route description ==
The designation follows present-day Columbia County Route 85; beginning at AR 98 in the unincorporated community of Atlanta in the Piney Woods of South Arkansas. AR 344 ran east before curving south, roughly paralleling the Big Carnie Creek through a rural area. State maintenance ended at the Union County line less than two miles (3.2 km) from the Louisiana state line, with the roadway continuing as Atlanta Road under county maintenance.

== History ==
In 1973, the Arkansas General Assembly passed Act 9 of 1973. The act directed county judges and legislators to designate up to 12 miles (19 km) of county roads as state highways in each county. On May 23, 1973, the Arkansas State Highway Commission designated a county road from Atlanta to the Union County line as Highway 344. The route was decommissioned as a state highway and returned to county maintenance by the Highway Commission on June 29, 1978, at the request of the Columbia County judge as part of a route swap to extend AR 98 and AR 355 within the county.

== Major intersections ==
| County | Location | mi | km | Destinations | Notes |
|---|---|---|---|---|---|
| Columbia | Atlanta | 0.00 | 0.00 | AR 98 – Emerson | Western terminus |
| Columbia–Union county line | | 8.00 | 12.87 | End state maintenance, roadway continues at Atlanta Road | Eastern terminus |
1.000 mi = 1.609 km; 1.000 km = 0.621 mi
