= Emerson High School (Arkansas) =

Location
- 212 Grayson Street; Emerson, Arkansas 71740; United States
- Coordinates: 33°5′54″N 93°11′50″W

Information
- Established: 1941 (85 years ago)
- School district: Emerson-Taylor-Bradley School District
- NCES District ID: 0500068
- Oversight: Arkansas Department of Education (ADE)
- Superintendent: Gary Hines
- CEEB code: 040710
- NCES School ID: 050006800292
- Principal: Jim Deloach
- Faculty: 21.57 (on FTE basis)
- Grades: 7–12
- Enrollment: 149 (2023-2024)
  - Grade 7: 14
  - Grade 8: 25
  - Grade 9: 27
  - Grade 10: 29
  - Grade 11: 28
  - Grade 12: 26
- Student to teacher ratio: 6.91
- Education system: ADE Smart Core curriculum
- Classes offered: Regular, Advanced Placement, Concurrent Credit
- Campus type: Rural
- Colors: Black and gold
- Athletics conference: 1A 7 East (2016-18)
- Sports: Archery, Basketball, Cheer, Softball, Tennis, Track & Field
- Mascot: Pirate
- Team name: Emerson Pirates
- Rival: Taylor High School
- Accreditation: ADE
- Yearbook: The Pirate
- Communities served: Emerson
- Feeder to: Emerson Elementary School
- Affiliation: Arkansas Activities Association (AAA)
- Website: emerson.etbsd.org/..

Emerson High School is a comprehensive public junior/senior high school serving grades seventh through twelve in the rural community of Emerson, Arkansas, United States. Located in southern Columbia County, Emerson High School is one of three public high schools in the county and one of three high schools administered by the Emerson–Taylor-Bradley School District. The Emerson Pirates have won five state basketball titles and 25 state track and field championships.

== History ==
Initially it was a part of the Emerson School District. On July 1, 2004, it consolidated with the Taylor School District to form the Emerson-Taylor School District (now the Emerson-Taylor-Bradley School District).

== Academics ==
The assumed course of study at Emerson High School is the Smart Core curriculum developed by the Arkansas Department of Education (ADE). Students engage in regular and Advanced Placement (AP) coursework and exams to obtain at least 23 units before graduation, which is one credit more than the state standard of 22 units. Exceptional students have been recognized as National Merit Finalists and participated in Arkansas Governor's School. The school maintains a concurrent credit partnership with South Arkansas Community College, whereas students in 11th and 12th grade can attend SACC and receive high school and college credit simultaneously. Students that graduate with a 3.50 or higher grade point average (GPA) are designated Honor Graduates, with Highest Honor Graduates graduating with a 3.75 or higher GPA.

Emerson High School was nationally recognized by the U.S. News & World Report Best High Schools 2016 report as the No. 26 school in Arkansas and the No. 2,579 in the nation.

== Athletics ==
The Emerson High School mascot is the Pirate with black and gold serving as the school colors.

For the 2016-18 seasons, the Emerson Pirates participate in the 1A Region 7 East Conference. Competition is primarily sanctioned by the Arkansas Activities Association with the Pirates competing in basketball (boys/girls), tennis (boys/girls), track and field (boys/girls), and softball (girls).

- Basketball: The girls basketball team are 4-time a state basketball champions (1952, 1956, 1981, 1994). The boys basketball team won a state basketball championship in 2001.
- Track and field: The boys and girls track teams at Emerson are one of the state's most successful with the boys capturing 18 state track championships (1979, 1980, 1981, 1982, 1984, 1985, 1986, 1987, 1988, 1989, 1990, 1991, 1992, 1993, 1999, 2003, 2004, 2005). The girls squads have won seven state track titles (1980, 1987, 1989, 1992, 1998, 1999, 2000).
