= Bradley High School =

Bradley High School may refer to one of the following high schools in the United States:

- Bradley High School (Arkansas) in Bradley, Arkansas
- Bradley Central High School in Cleveland, Tennessee
- Hilliard Bradley High School in Hilliard, Ohio

== See also ==
- Bradlee School in Andover, Massachusetts
- Bradley County Schools in Bradley County, Tennessee
- Bradley School District in Bradley, Arkansas
