= Greg Davis (basketball) =

American basketball player

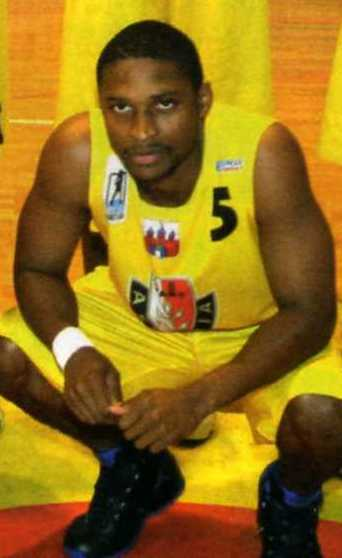
- Davis with Enea Astoria Bydgoszcz during the 2005–06 season

Personal information
- Born: June 25, 1982 (age 44) Hope, Arkansas, U.S.
- Listed height: 6 ft 1 in (1.85 m)
- Listed weight: 165 lb (75 kg)

Career information
- High school: Bradley (Bradley, Arkansas)
- College: Bossier Parish CC (2000–2002); Troy (2002–2004)
- NBA draft: 2004: undrafted
- Playing career: 2004–2010
- Position: Point guard

Career history
- 2004: Alerta Cantabria
- 2004–2005: Fayetteville Patriots
- 2005–2006: Enea Astoria Bydgoszcz
- 2006–2007: Löwen Braunschweig
- 2007–2008: Kotwica Kołobrzeg
- 2008: Kwidzyn
- 2010: Hapoel Be'eri

Career highlights
- NCAA assists leader (2004); Atlantic Sun Player of the Year (2004); First-team All-Atlantic Sun (2004)

Gregory Tremaine Davis (born June 25, 1982) is an American former professional basketball player. He played college basketball for the Troy State Trojans and was the Atlantic Sun Player of the Year during his senior season in 2004.

== Early life ==
Davis was born in Hope, Arkansas. He lived with his grandparents in Bradley, Arkansas, from when he was in the first grade because he wanted to stay close to his friends. His parents lived with his 10 siblings in Houston, Texas.

Davis attended Bradley High School in Bradley and was a three-year starter on the basketball team. He averaged 32 points, 9 rebounds and 11 assists per game during his senior season and led the team to a 34–1 record. Davis was a two-time all-state shooting guard.

Davis aspired to play for the Arkansas Razorbacks but was not recruited by them nor other major colleges.

== College career ==
Davis began his collegiate career at Bossier Parish Community College where he was in the starting line-up for his two seasons there. He averaged 19.3 points and 4.4 assists per game during the 2001–02 season while the team recorded a 23–10 record.

On May 29, 2002, Davis signed to join the Troy State Trojans. He was recruited by assistant coach David Felix and committed to the program because of their fast-break offensive style of play. Davis was shifted to point guard when he joined the team.

Davis averaged 11.0 points per game during the 2002–03 season as the Tigers qualified for their first NCAA Division I tournament appearance.

Davis averaged 15.5 points during the 2003–04 season. He averaged 8.1 assists per game to lead the nation. Davis' 256 assists were a single-season record for the Trojans and Atlantic Sun Conference. Davis was selected as the Atlantic Sun Player of the Year.

== Professional career ==
Davis worked out for the Portland Trail Blazers, Orlando Magic and San Antonio Spurs prior to the 2004 NBA draft.

Davis was selected by the Fayetteville Patriots in the sixth round of the 2004 NBA Development League draft. He started the 2004–05 season in Spain with Alerta Cantabria and scored 15 points in three games before he was released. On November 18, 2004, Davis was named to the roster of the Patriots. He averaged 3.7 points and 2.6 assists per game in 42 games played with the Patriots during the 2004–05 season.
