= Taylor High School (Arkansas) =

Location
- 506 East Pine Street; Taylor, Arkansas 71861; United States; 33°5′56″N 93°27′24″W

Information
- Status: Open
- School district: Emerson–Taylor-Bradley School District
- NCES District ID: 0500068
- Oversight: Arkansas Department of Education (ADE)
- CEEB code: 042400
- NCES School ID: 050006801063
- Faculty: 14.19 (on FTE basis)
- Grades: 7–12
- Enrollment: 259 (2023–2024)
- Student to teacher ratio: 8.59
- Education system: ADE Smart Core curriculum
- Classes offered: Regular, Advanced placement
- Campus type: Rural
- Colors: Blue and white
- Athletics conference: 1A 7 East (2012–14)
- Sports: Golf, basketball, baseball, softball
- Mascot: Tiger
- Team name: Taylor Tigers
- Accreditation: ADE
- Affiliation: Arkansas Activities Association (AAA)
- Website: taylor.etbsd.org/..

Taylor High School is a comprehensive public junior-senior high school serving grades seventh through twelfth in the rural community of Taylor, Arkansas, United States. Located in southern Columbia County, Taylor High School is one of three public high schools in the county and one of three high schools administered by the Emerson–Taylor-Bradley School District.

== History ==
Initially it was a part of the Taylor School District. On July 1, 2004, it consolidated with the Emerson School District to form the Emerson-Taylor School District (now the Emerson-Taylor-Bradley School District).

== Academics ==
The assumed course of study at Taylor High School is the Smart Core curriculum developed by the Arkansas Department of Education (ADE). Students engage in regular and Advanced Placement (AP) coursework and exams to obtain at least 23 units before graduation, which is one credit more than the state standard of 22 units. Exceptional students have been recognized as National Merit Finalists and participated in Arkansas Governor's School. The school maintains a concurrent credit partnership with South Arkansas Community College, whereas students in 11th and 12th grade can attend SACC and receive high school and college credit simultaneously. Students that graduate with a 3.50 or higher grade point average (GPA) are designated Honor Graduates, with Highest Honor Graduates graduating with a 3.75 or higher GPA.

== Athletics ==
The Taylor High School mascot is the Tiger with blue and white serving as the school colors.

For the 2012–14 seasons, the Taylor Tigers participate in the 1A Region 7 East Conference. Competition is primarily sanctioned by the Arkansas Activities Association with the Tigers competing in golf (boys/girls), basketball (boys/girls), baseball, and softball.

The Tigers baseball team has won 10 state championships including five consecutive (2022–2026).
