= Arkansas Highway 344 =

State highway in Arkansas, United States

Highway 344

Route information
- Maintained by ArDOT
- Length: 8.08 mi (13.00 km)
- Existed: November 23, 1966–present

Major junctions
- West end: US 82 near Jefferson
- East end: US 371 near Magnolia

Location
- Country: United States
- State: Arkansas
- Counties: Columbia

Highway system
- Arkansas Highway System; Interstate; US; State; Business; Spurs; Suffixed; Scenic; Heritage
| ← AR 343 | → AR 345 |

Highway 344 (AR 344, Ark. 344, and Hwy. 344) is an east–west state highway in Columbia County. The route of 8.08 miles (13.00 km) begins at US Highway 82 (US 82) and runs east to US 371 near Magnolia. The route is maintained by the Arkansas State Highway and Transportation Department (AHTD).

== Route description ==
Highway 344 begins at US 82 in western Columbia County and runs southeast through pine forest typical of the Arkansas Timberlands. The route crosses Lake Columbia, a bayou created by the extremely slow moving Beech Creek. Near the lake, Highway 344 has access to Beech Creek Landing and C. Maurice Lewis Jr. Landing, both owned and maintained by the Arkansas Game and Fish Commission. Continuing southeast, the route passes through Kilgore Lodge and intersects with county highways before terminating at US 371 west of Magnolia.

== History ==
The route was created by the Arkansas State Highway Commission on November 23, 1966 between US 82 and Highway 132 along its present alignment. Highway 132 was redesignated as US 371 in 1994.

== Major intersections ==
The entire route is in Columbia County.

| Location | mi | km | Destinations | Notes |
|---|---|---|---|---|
| | 0.00 | 0.00 | US 82 – Lewisville, Magnolia | Western terminus |
| | 8.08 | 13.00 | US 371 – Magnolia, Taylor | Eastern terminus |
1.000 mi = 1.609 km; 1.000 km = 0.621 mi
