= Jefferson, Arkansas =

Jefferson, Arkansas may refer to the following communities:

- Jefferson, Columbia County, Arkansas
- Jefferson, Jefferson County, Arkansas

== See also ==
- Jefferson County, Arkansas
