= William H. Smith House =

Historic house in Arkansas, United States

- U.S. National Register of Historic Places
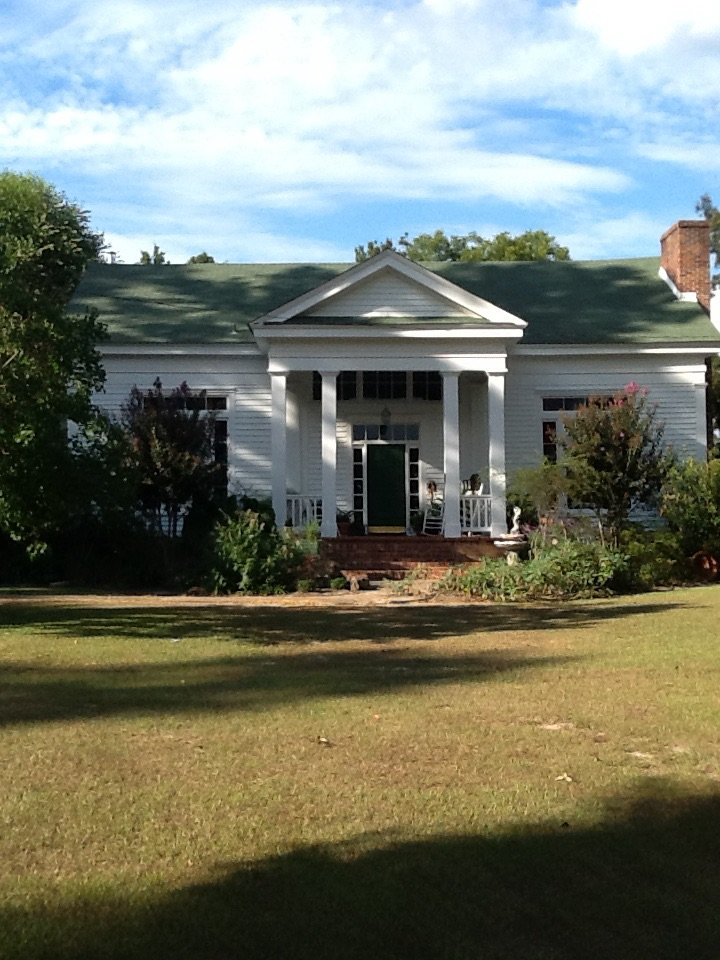

- Location within Arkansas Location within the United States
- Location: N of jct. of AR 98 and Co. Rd. 85, Atlanta, Arkansas
- Coordinates: 33°7′12″N 93°3′12″W
- Area: 3 acres (1.2 ha)
- Built: 1857
- Architectural style: Greek Revival
- NRHP reference No.: 92001630
- Added to NRHP: November 27, 1992

The William H. Smith House is a historic house in the small community of Atlanta, Arkansas. It is located northeast of the junction of Arkansas Highway 98 and County Road 85. It is a single-story wood-frame structure in the shape of an L. It was originally built c. 1857 as a dogtrot house, but the dogtrot has since been enclosed. The main body of the house is clad in weatherboard, while the enclosed dogtrot is flushboarded, with a porch in the rear and a projecting gable-roofed entry in the front. The entry is particularly elaborate for surviving period Greek Revival buildings, with both sidelight and transom windows. It is the only surviving antebellum house in the small town.

The house was listed on the National Register of Historic Places in 1992.

== See also ==
- National Register of Historic Places listings in Columbia County, Arkansas
