= Bradley County High School (disambiguation) =

Bradley County High School may refer to:

- Bradley Central High School in Bradley County, Tennessee
- Bradley High School (Arkansas) in Bradley, Arkansas
- Bradley County High School, former school in Warren, Arkansas
