= Arkansas Highway 98 =

State highway in Arkansas, United States

Highway 98

Route information
- Maintained by ArDOT
- Length: 47.15 mi (75.88 km)
- Existed: 1940–present

Major junctions
- West end: US 82
- US 371 in Waldo; US 79 in McNeil; US 82; US 79 in Emerson
- East end: AR 19 at Walkerville

Location
- Country: United States
- State: Arkansas
- Counties: Columbia

Highway system
- Arkansas Highway System; Interstate; US; State; Business; Spurs; Suffixed; Scenic; Heritage
← AR 97	→ AR 99

Arkansas Highway 98 (AR 98 and Hwy. 98) is an east–west state highway in Columbia County, Arkansas. The 47.15-mile-long (75.88 km) route travels essentially in an incomplete loop with Magnolia at its center. The route begins at U.S. Route 82 (US 82) near Waldo and intersects US 371, US 79, US 82, and US 79 before terminating at AR 19. An officially designated exception over US 371 of 1.12 miles (1.80 km) occurs near the eastern terminus.

== Route description ==
AR 98 begins at US 82 west of Waldo. An officially designated exception begins at US 371 (Olive Street) in Waldo, and a concurrency of 1.12 miles (1.80 km). Continuing east past the National Register of Historic Places-listed Waldo Water Tower, AR 98 intersects AR 98B (its only business route) in McNeil. The highway forms a concurrency with US 79 briefly north before turning east then south.

AR 98 continues south through the community of Village before intersecting US 82 in east Columbia County. The route passes near the W. H. Allen House in rural Columbia County and the William H. Smith House in Atlanta. Now turning west the route passes through Emerson where it intersects US 79 and becomes Main Street. The highway continues west to Walkerville, where it ends at AR 19.

== History ==
AR 98 was originally designated from US 64 in Altus to AR 109. This highway was deleted in 1929, and is now AR 179 and Kirk Road, while the bridge over the Arkansas River has since been destroyed.

The current AR 98 was designated in 1940 from Waldo to McNeil, replacing one of the sections of AR 3, which was decommissioned. The road has since been extended in both directions.

== Major intersections ==
The entire route is in Columbia County.

Location	mi	km	Destinations	Notes
Lumber	0.00	0.00	US 82 – Texarkana, Magnolia	Western terminus
Waldo	2.51	4.04	US 371 north (Olive Street) – Rosston	Western end of US 371 concurrency
Waldo	3.63	5.84	US 371 south (McKissack Street) – Magnolia	Eastern end of US 371 concurrency
McNeil	7.45	11.99	AR 98B north (Mulberry Street)	
McNeil	7.95	12.79	US 79 south (South Avenue) – Magnolia	Western end of US 79 concurrency
	9.95	16.01	US 79 north – Camden	Eastern end of US 79 concurrency
Village Junction	21.22	34.15	US 82 – El Dorado, Magnolia	
Atlanta			CR 85 south	Former AR 344
Emerson	40.43	65.07	US 79 (Elm Street) – Haynesville LA, Magnolia	
Walkerville	47.15	75.88	AR 19 – Walkerville, Magnolia	Eastern terminus
1.000 mi = 1.609 km; 1.000 km = 0.621 mi: Concurrency terminus

== McNeil business route ==
Highway 98B
- Location: McNeil
- Length: 0.94 mi (1,510 m)
- Existed: May 27, 1970–present

Highway 98 Business (AR 98B, Ark. 98B, and Hwy. 98B) is a business route in McNeil. It is 0.94 miles (1.51 km) in length. Prior to designation as AR 98B in 1970, the route was designated as US 79 City.
