= Alex Willingham =

Professor and African scholar

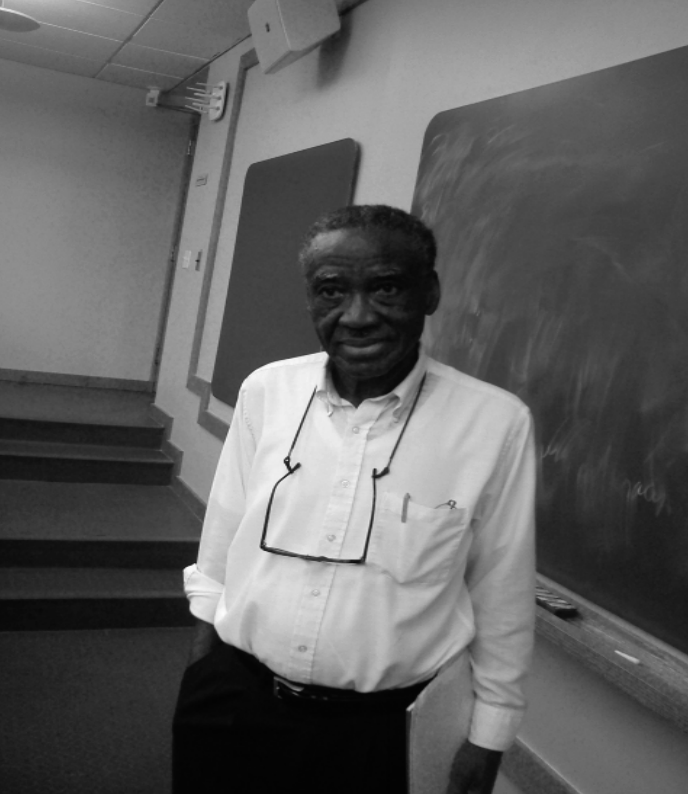
- Willingham in 2011
- Born: Alexander Wesley Willingham; October 28, 1940; Bradley, Arkansas
- Died: August 29, 2023 (aged 82); Quincy, Massachusetts
- Spouse: Jennett (Brown) Willingham (m. 1965)
- Children: 2

Academic background
- Education: Southern University (BA); University of Iowa (MA); University of North Carolina at Chapel Hill (PhD)
- Thesis: Black political thought in the United States: A characterization (1974)

Academic work
- Discipline: Political Science
- Sub-discipline: African American Studies
- Institutions: Southern University; Atlanta University; Williams College

Alex Wesley Willingham (October 28, 1940 – August 29, 2023) was a Professor of Political Science and Chair of the African American Studies Program at Williams College. He was a founding member of the National Conference of Black Political Scientists.

== Early life and education ==
Willingham was born in Bradley, Arkansas, to Asa and Minnie Willingham. He grew up in Louisiana and graduated from Booker T. Washington High School in Shreveport. He earned his B.A. and M.A. from Southern University, Baton Rouge (1963) and the University of Iowa (1965), respectively. He married Jennett Brown Willingham that same year. He then completed a Ph.D. at the University of North Carolina in 1974.

== Career ==
Willingham spent time on the Southern University faculty during the early 1970s and later joined Atlanta University as an associate professor until 1979. Between 1979 and 1988, he worked as a writer for the Shreveport Sun and a researcher at the Rockefeller Foundation and Southern Regional Council before joining Williams College as a professor of political science in 1989. At Williams, he served as the Chair of the African American Studies program, director of the Williams College Multicultural Center, and Schumann Professor for Democratic Studies. He was named Professor of Political Science, emeritus when he retired in 2012.

=== Activism ===
Willingham's activism began as a student at Southern University, where he participated in protests both on campus and in Baton Rouge. After becoming less involved in activism while working on his M.A. in Iowa, his focus was shifted towards civil and voting rights during his time at UNC. After joining the Williams College faculty, Willingham continued his work by supporting civil rights groups such as the Georgia Legal Services, ACLU, NAACP-LDF, the Center for Constitutional Rights, and the Southern Poverty Law Center.

== Selected publications ==
Willingham, Alex W. and Brennan Center for Justice. 2002. Beyond the Color Line: Race, Representation, and Community in the New Century. New York, NY: Brennan Center for Justice at New York University School of Law.

Willingham, Alex W. 2009. “New Bottle, Same Drink? The Opinion of the U.S. Supreme Court on the Indiana Voter Identification Law.” The Journal of Race & Policy 5 (1): 91–112.

Willingham, Alex. 2019. “The Role of Pathology and Studying Race, Comments on Renewing Black Intellectual History: The Ideological and Material Foundations of African American Thought.” National Political Science Review 20 (1): 163–72.
