= Atlanta, Arkansas =

Atlanta
- Unincorporated community
- Interactive map of Atlanta
- Coordinates: 33°07′07″N 93°03′10″W
- Country: United States
- State: Arkansas
- County: Columbia
- Elevation: 260 ft (80 m)

Atlanta is an unincorporated community in Columbia County, Arkansas, United States, at an elevation of 262 feet (80 m). Highway 98 passes south through Atlanta before turning west to Emerson.
