= Emerson-Taylor-Bradley School District =

School district in Arkansas

Location
- 506 East Pine; Taylor, Arkansas 71861 United States

District information
- Motto: Three Schools-One Dream
- Grades: PK–12
- Superintendent: David Downs
- Accreditation: Arkansas Department of Education
- Schools: 6
- NCES District ID: 0500068

Students and staff
- Students: 987 (2015-2016)
- Teachers: 56.92 (on FTE basis)
- Staff: 268.09 (on FTE basis)
- Student–teacher ratio: 10.75
- Athletic conference: 1A 7 East (2012–14)
- District mascot: Emerson Pirates; Taylor Tigers; Bradley Bears
- Colors: Emerson: Black gold Taylor: Royal blue white Bradley: purple gold

Other information
- Website: www.etbsd.org

Emerson–Taylor-Bradley School District (ETBSD) is a public school district headquartered in Taylor, Arkansas, United States. The school district supports more than 950 students in prekindergarten through grade 12 in the 2015-2016 school year by employing more than 250 faculty and staff on a full time equivalent basis for its six schools.

The school district encompasses 291.69 square miles (755.5 km^{2}) of land, in Columbia County and Lafayette County, and it serves all of Emerson, Taylor, and Bradley.

== History ==
It was established on July 1, 2004 as the Emerson-Taylor School District by the consolidation of the Emerson School District and the Taylor School District.

Gary Hines, the superintendent of Emerson-Taylor at the time, had argued in favor of the consolidation with the Bradley School District, citing the proximity between Bradley and Taylor. Bradley was seeking consolidation, as by 2013 it had only 357 students. The state had a law stating that a merger would be forced if any school district had fewer than 350 students for three or more years. The Emerson-Taylor and the Bradley school districts jointly requested a merger. In May 2013 the Arkansas Board of Education approved the district's merger with the Emerson-Taylor district, resulting in the Emerson-Taylor-Bradley School District effective July 1, 2013. In the hearing on consolidation, Mark Keith, the superintendent of the Lafayette County School District, argued that Bradley should have consolidated with his district and stated his opposition to the consolidation with Emerson-Taylor. Gammye Moore, the Bradley superintendent, became the assistant superintendent of Emerson-Taylor-Bradley while Hines remained as the superintendent.

== Schools ==
Emerson–Taylor-Bradley secondary schools compete in interschool activities at the junior high and high schools in the 1A 7 East conference administered by the Arkansas Activities Association. The mascot for Emerson schools is the Pirate, for Taylor schools, the Tiger, and for Bradley schools, the "Bear" serves as the athletic emblem.

Secondary:

- Emerson High School, based in Emerson and serving more than 125 students in grades 7 through 12.
- Taylor High School, based in Taylor and serving more than 150 students in grades 7 through 12.
- Bradley High School, based in Bradley and serving more than 150 students in grades 7 through 12

Primary:

- Emerson Elementary School, based in Emerson and serving more than 180 students in prekindergarten through grade 6.
- Taylor Elementary School, based in Taylor and serving more than 200 students in prekindergarten through grade 6.
- Bradley Elementary School, based in Bradley and serving more than 150 students in prekindergarten through grade 6.
