= Taylor, Arkansas =

- City
- Location of Taylor in Columbia County, Arkansas.
- Coordinates: 33°05′59″N 93°27′43″W
- Country: United States
- State: Arkansas
- County: Columbia

Area
  - Total: 0.99 sq mi (2.57 km^{2})
  - Land: 0.99 sq mi (2.57 km^{2})
  - Water: 0 sq mi (0.00 km^{2})
- Elevation: 243 ft (74 m)

Population (2020)
  - Total: 579
  - Estimate (2025): 560 ▼
  - Density: 583.1/sq mi (225.12/km^{2})
- Time zone: UTC-6 (Central (CST))
  - Summer (DST): UTC-5 (CDT)
- ZIP code: 71861
- Area code: 870
- FIPS code: 05-68660
- GNIS feature ID: 2405572

Taylor is a city in Columbia County, Arkansas, United States. As of the 2020 census, Taylor had a population of 579.

== Geography ==
Taylor is located in southwestern Columbia County.

According to the United States Census Bureau, the city has a total area of 1.0 square mile (2.6 km^{2}), all land.

== Education ==
Public education for early childhood, elementary and secondary school students is provided by the Emerson–Taylor-Bradley School District (formerly the Emerson–Taylor School District), which includes Taylor Elementary School and Taylor High School. The district was established on July 1, 2004, by the consolidation of the Emerson School District and the Taylor School District.

== Demographics ==
Historical population
Census	Pop.	Note	%±
1920	275		—
1930	263		−4.4%
1940	335		27.4%
1950	547		63.3%
1960	734		34.2%
1970	671		−8.6%
1980	657		−2.1%
1990	621		−5.5%
2000	566		−8.9%
2010	566		0.0%
2020	579		2.3%
2025 (est.)	560	▼	−3.3%
U.S. Decennial Census

As of the census of 2000, there were 566 people, 220 households, and 166 families residing in the city. The population density was 566.2 inhabitants per square mile (218.6/km^{2}). There were 251 housing units at an average density of 251.1 per square mile (97.0/km^{2}). The racial makeup of the city was 94.70% White, 3.71% Black or African American, 0.53% Native American, 0.18% Pacific Islander, and 0.88% from two or more races. 0.53% of the population were Hispanic or Latino of any race. There were 220 households, out of which 30.0% had children under the age of 18 living with them, 60.0% were married couples living together, 8.6% had a female householder with no husband present, and 24.1% were non-families. 22.3% of all households were made up of individuals, and 13.6% had someone living alone who was 65 years of age or older. The average household size was 2.43 and the average family size was 2.78.

In the city, the population was spread out, with 21.2% under the age of 18, 9.2% from 18 to 24, 23.5% from 25 to 44, 24.0% from 45 to 64, and 22.1% who were 65 years of age or older. The median age was 41 years. For every 100 females, there were 95.8 males. For every 100 females age 18 and over, there were 94.8 males.

The median income for a household in the city was $31,534, and the median income for a family was $39,167. Males had a median income of $30,750 versus $18,125 for females. The per capita income for the city was $13,725. About 6.2% of families and 9.5% of the population were below the poverty line, including 14.9% of those under age 18 and 11.5% of those age 65 or over.

== Infrastructure ==
=== Highways ===
- U.S. Highway 371
- Arkansas Highway 160
