= Emerson, Arkansas =

- Town
- Location of Emerson in Columbia County, Arkansas.
- Coordinates: 33°05′50″N 93°11′46″W
- Country: United States
- State: Arkansas
- County: Columbia
- Established: February 8th,1905

Area
  - Total: 0.99 sq mi (2.57 km^{2})
  - Land: 0.99 sq mi (2.57 km^{2})
  - Water: 0 sq mi (0.00 km^{2})
- Elevation: 308 ft (94 m)

Population (2020)
  - Total: 293
  - Estimate (2025): 282 ▼
  - Density: 295.7/sq mi (114.17/km^{2})
- Time zone: UTC-6 (Central (CST))
  - Summer (DST): UTC-5 (CDT)
- ZIP code: 71740
- Area code: 870
- FIPS code: 05-21580
- GNIS feature ID: 2406449

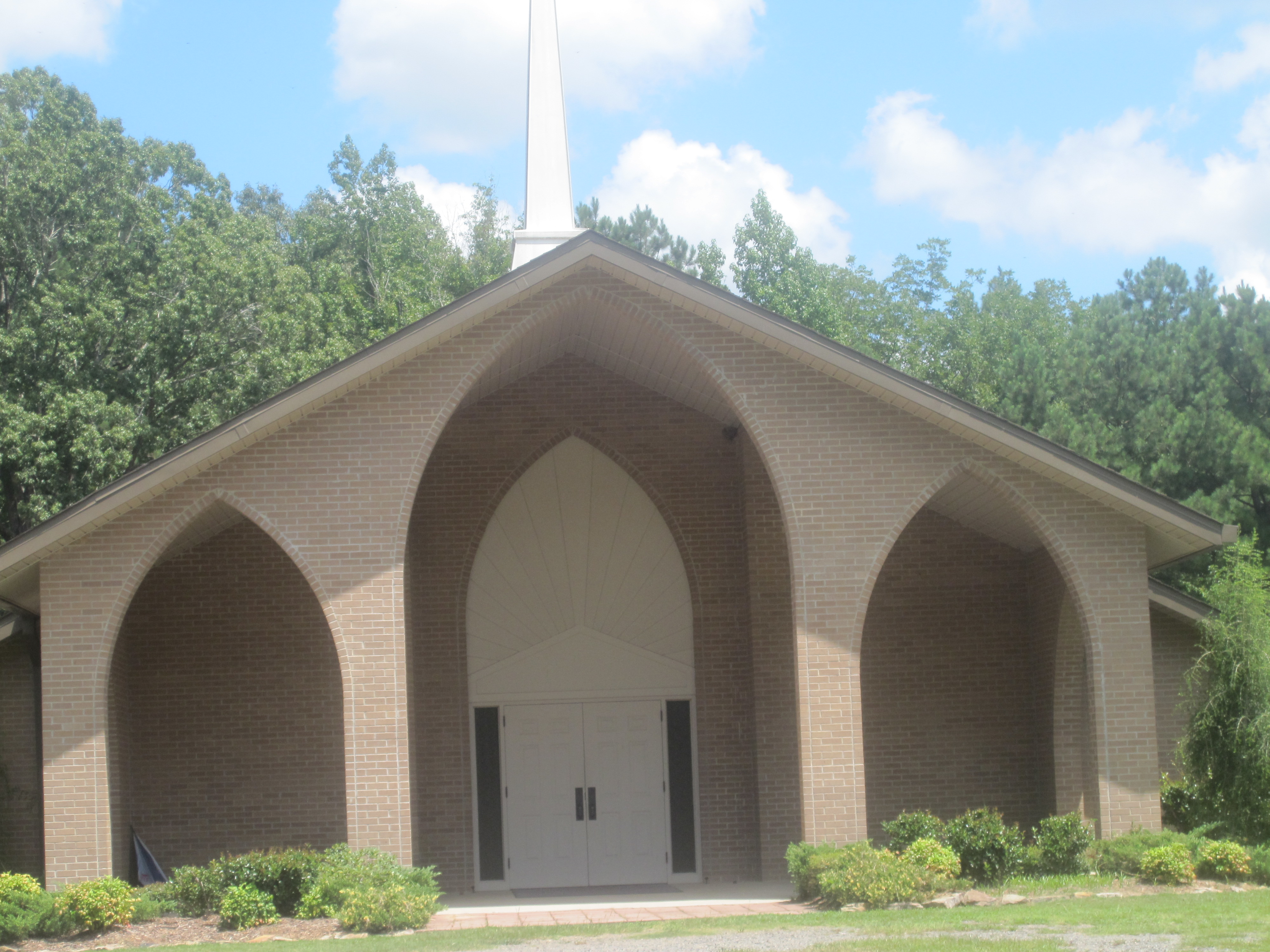
Brister Baptist Church on U.S. Highway 79 north of Emerson.

Emerson is a town in Columbia County, Arkansas, United States. The population was 293 at the 2020 census.

== History ==
=== Eponym ===
Emerson derives its name from Reuben Loggins Emerson, an early settler of Columbia County, who was a teacher, merchant, banker, owner of the newspaper The Columbia Banner, and state representative. In 1905, he founded the town which today bears his name. Emerson celebrated its 100th birthday February 8, 2005.

== Geography ==
Emerson is located in southern Columbia County and is located along U.S. Route 79, 12 miles (19 km) south of Magnolia, the county seat, and 9 miles (14 km) north of Haynesville, Louisiana.

Emerson is also 68 miles (109 km) from Shreveport, Louisiana, and 205 miles (330 km) from Dallas, Texas.

According to the United States Census Bureau, Emerson has a total area of 1.0 square mile (2.6 km^{2}), all land.

== Demographics ==
Historical population
| Census | Pop. | Note | %± |
|---|---|---|---|
| 1920 | 357 | | — |
| 1930 | 373 | | 4.5% |
| 1940 | 501 | | 34.3% |
| 1950 | 523 | | 4.4% |
| 1960 | 350 | | −33.1% |
| 1970 | 393 | | 12.3% |
| 1980 | 444 | | 13.0% |
| 1990 | 317 | | −28.6% |
| 2000 | 359 | | 13.2% |
| 2010 | 368 | | 2.5% |
| 2020 | 293 | | −20.4% |
| 2025 (est.) | 282 | ▼ | −3.8% |
U.S. Decennial Census; 2014 Estimate

As of the census of 2010, there were 368 people, 138 households, and 97 families residing in the town. The population density was 140.0 people/km^{2} (363 people/mi^{2}). There were 165 housing units at an average density of 64.4 units/km^{2} (167 units/mi^{2}). The racial makeup of the town was 66% White, 32.60% Black or African American, and 0.3% from other races. 1.1% of the population were Hispanic or Latino of any race.

There were 138 households, out of which 35.5% had children under the age of 18 living with them, 50.7% were married couples living together, 15.2% had a female householder with no husband present, and 29.7% were non-families. 26.8% of all households were made up of individuals, and 13.8% had someone living alone who was 65 years of age or older. The average household size was 2.60 and the average family size was 3.16.

In the town, the population was spread out, with 28.7% under the age of 18, 7.5% from 18 to 24, 28.4% from 25 to 44, 17.3% from 45 to 64, and 18.1% who were 65 years of age or older. The median age was 36 years. For every 100 females, there were 92.0 males. For every 100 females age 18 and over, there were 88.2 males.

The median income for a household in the town was $32,969, and the median income for a family was $40,000. Males had a median income of $32,333 versus $17,500 for females. The per capita income for the town was $14,988. About 17.7% of families and 27.2% of the population were below the poverty line, including 46.9% of those under age 18 and 16.3% of those age 65 or over.

== Economy ==
Major industries in the area are timber, bromine and bromine-based products, and oil.

== Infrastructure ==
=== Highways ===
- U.S. Highway 79
- Arkansas Highway 98

== Arts and culture ==
=== Annual cultural events ===
Each year since 1990, on the last Saturday of June, Emerson hosts the Purple Hull Peas Festival & World Championship Rotary Tiller Race.

== Education ==
Public education for early childhood, elementary and secondary school students is primarily provided by the Emerson-Taylor-Bradley School District (formerly the Emerson-Taylor School District), which includes Emerson Elementary School and Emerson High School. The district was established on July 1, 2004, by the consolidation of the Emerson School District and the Taylor School District. The Emerson Pirates have won five state basketball championships and 25 state track and field titles.
