= Lumber City =

Lumber City can refer to:

- Lumber City, Georgia
- Lumber City, Pennsylvania
