= Lumber, Arkansas =

Unincorporated community in Arkansas, US

Coordinates: 33°21′01″N 93°20′51″W

Lumber is an unincorporated community in Columbia County, Arkansas, in the United States.
