= Columbia County, Arkansas =

County in Arkansas, United States

- County
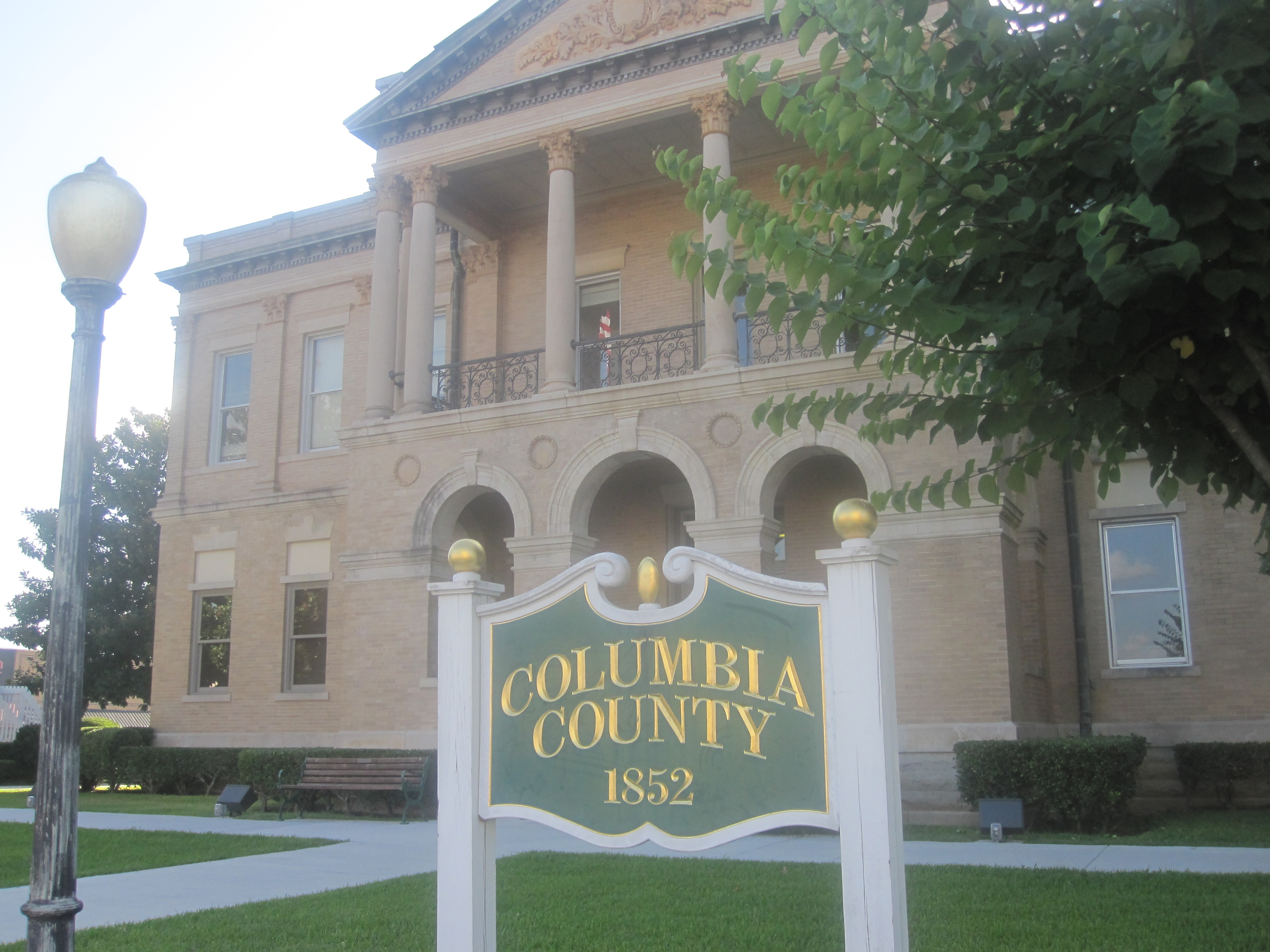
- Columbia County Courthouse in Magnolia

- Location within the U.S. state of Arkansas
- Coordinates: 33°14′28″N 93°13′06″W
- Country: United States
- State: Arkansas
- Founded: December 17, 1852
- Named for: Columbia
- Seat: Magnolia
- Largest city: Magnolia

Area
  - Total: 767 sq mi (1,990 km^{2})
  - Land: 766 sq mi (1,980 km^{2})
  - Water: 0.7 sq mi (1.8 km^{2}) 0.1%

Population (2020)
  - Total: 22,801
  - Estimate (2025): 21,894 ▼
  - Density: 29.8/sq mi (11.5/km^{2})
- Time zone: UTC−6 (Central)
  - Summer (DST): UTC−5 (CDT)
- Congressional district: 4th
- Website: www.columbiacountyar.com

Columbia County is a county located in the U.S. state of Arkansas. As of the 2020 census, the population was 22,801. The county seat is Magnolia. The county was formed on December 17, 1852, and was named for Christopher Columbus. The Magnolia, AR Micropolitan Statistical Area includes all of Columbia County.

Columbia County is home to Southern Arkansas University, which dominates the economic and cultural landscape of the county.

== Geography ==
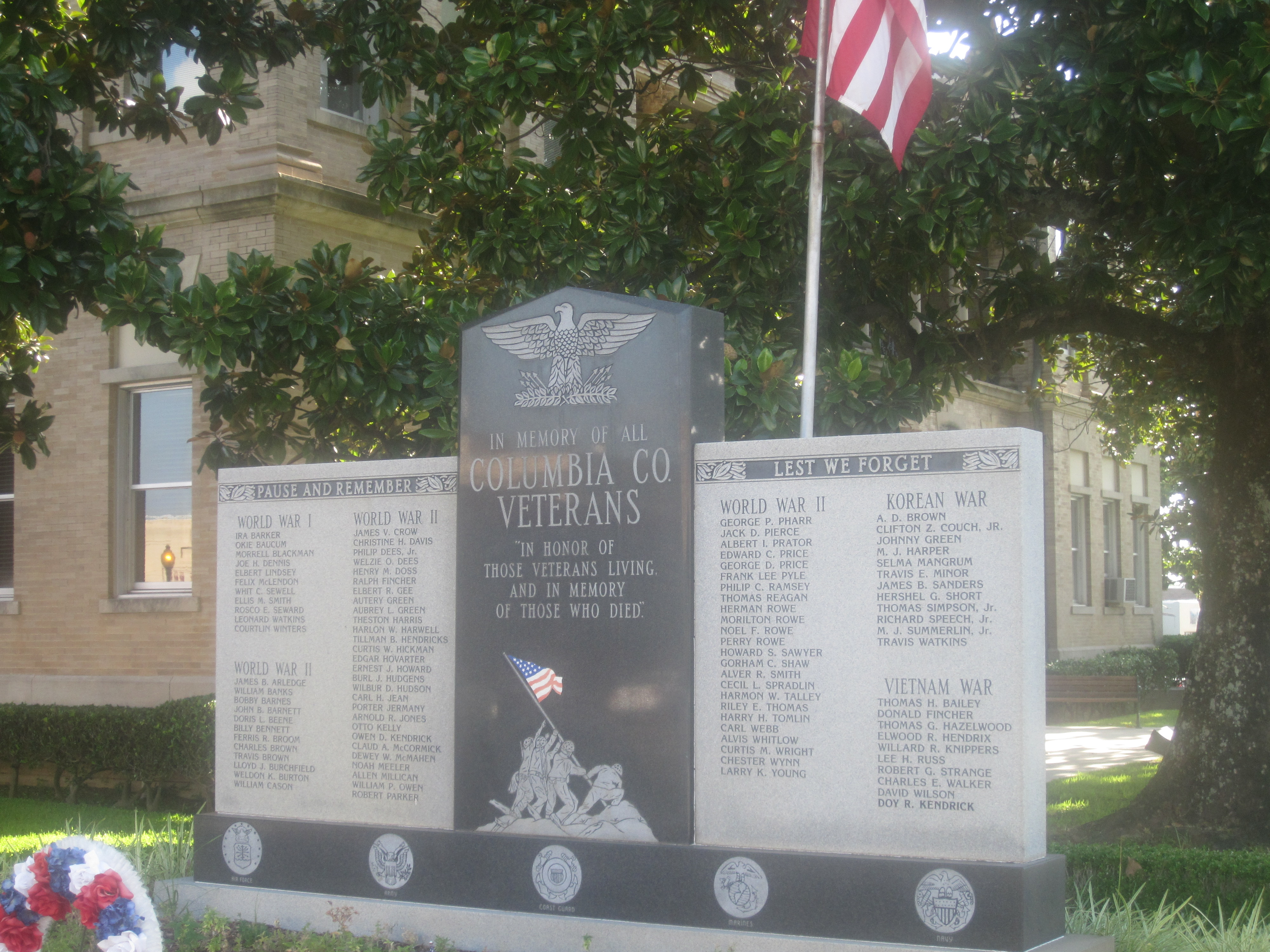
Columbia County Veterans Memorial on courthouse lawn in Magnolia

According to the U.S. Census Bureau, the county has a total area of 767 square miles (1,990 km^{2}), of which 766 square miles (1,980 km^{2}) is land and 0.7 square miles (1.8 km^{2}) (0.1%) is water. Columbia County is in South Arkansas. Columbia County, along with Union County, is home to the largest bromine reserve in the United States.

Dorcheat Bayou flows through Columbia County from its origin in Nevada County southward into Webster Parish, Louisiana, before emptying into Lake Bistineau.

=== Adjacent counties ===
- Nevada County (north)
- Ouachita County (northeast)
- Union County (east)
- Claiborne Parish, Louisiana (southeast)
- Webster Parish, Louisiana (south)
- Lafayette County (west)

== Demographics ==
Historical population
Census	Pop.	Note	%±
1860	12,449		—
1870	11,397		−8.5%
1880	14,090		23.6%
1890	19,893		41.2%
1900	22,077		11.0%
1910	23,820		7.9%
1920	27,670		16.2%
1930	27,320		−1.3%
1940	29,822		9.2%
1950	28,770		−3.5%
1960	26,400		−8.2%
1970	25,952		−1.7%
1980	26,644		2.7%
1990	25,691		−3.6%
2000	25,603		−0.3%
2010	24,552		−4.1%
2020	22,801		−7.1%
2025 (est.)	21,894	▼	−4.0%
U.S. Decennial Census; 1790–1960 1900–1990; 1990–2000 2010

=== 2020 census ===
As of the 2020 census, the county had a population of 22,801. The median age was 37.3 years. 21.3% of residents were under the age of 18 and 18.1% of residents were 65 years of age or older. For every 100 females there were 90.7 males, and for every 100 females age 18 and over there were 88.1 males age 18 and over.

The racial makeup of the county was 58.6% White, 34.5% Black or African American, 0.3% American Indian and Alaska Native, 0.7% Asian, <0.1% Native Hawaiian and Pacific Islander, 2.1% from some other race, and 3.7% from two or more races. Hispanic or Latino residents of any race comprised 3.4% of the population.

45.6% of residents lived in urban areas, while 54.4% lived in rural areas.

There were 9,082 households in the county, of which 28.7% had children under the age of 18 living in them. Of all households, 40.4% were married-couple households, 20.7% were households with a male householder and no spouse or partner present, and 33.8% were households with a female householder and no spouse or partner present. About 33.3% of all households were made up of individuals and 14.4% had someone living alone who was 65 years of age or older.

There were 10,999 housing units, of which 17.4% were vacant. Among occupied housing units, 67.4% were owner-occupied and 32.6% were renter-occupied. The homeowner vacancy rate was 2.1% and the rental vacancy rate was 11.7%.

=== 2000 census ===
As of the 2000 census, there were 25,603 people, 9,981 households, and 6,747 families residing in the county. The population density was 33 people per square mile (13 people/km^{2}). There were 11,566 housing units at an average density of 15 units per square mile (5.8 units/km^{2}). The racial makeup of the county was 62.08% White, 36.06% Black or African American, 0.26% Native American, 0.34% Asian, 0.03% Pacific Islander, 0.46% from other races, and 0.77% from two or more races. 1.05% of the population were Hispanic or Latino of any race.

There were 9,981 households, out of which 30.10% had children under the age of 18 living with them, 48.90% were married couples living together, 15.10% had a female householder with no husband present, and 32.40% were non-families. 29.20% of all households were made up of individuals, and 13.80% had someone living alone who was 65 years of age or older. The average household size was 2.45 and the average family size was 3.03.

In the county, the population was spread out, with 25.10% under the age of 18, 12.30% from 18 to 24, 25.30% from 25 to 44, 21.40% from 45 to 64, and 15.90% who were 65 years of age or older. The median age was 36 years. For every 100 females there were 90.90 males. For every 100 females age 18 and over, there were 86.70 males.

The median income for a household in the county was $27,640, and the median income for a family was $36,271. Males had a median income of $31,313 versus $20,099 for females. The per capita income for the county was $15,322. About 15.80% of families and 21.10% of the population were below the poverty line, including 28.70% of those under age 18 and 20.00% of those age 65 or over.

== Transportation ==
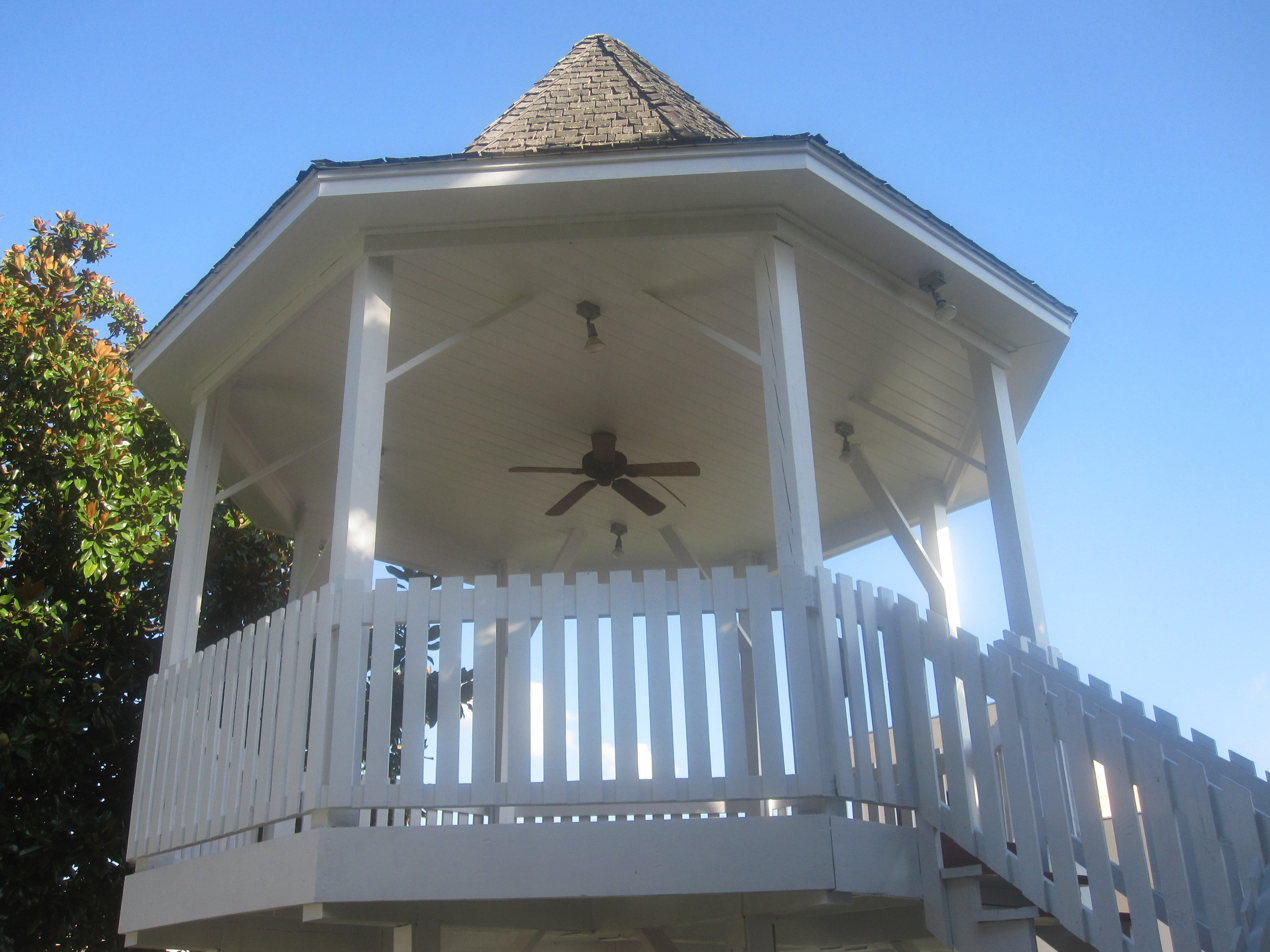
Gazebo at Columbia County Courthouse

=== Major highways ===
- Future Interstate 69
- U.S. Highway 79
- U.S. Highway 82
- U.S. Highway 371
- Highway 19
- Highway 57
- Highway 98
- Highway 160
- Highway 344
- Highway 355
- Highway 980

=== Airports ===
Magnolia Municipal Airport is a public-use airport in Columbia County. It is owned by the city of Magnolia and located three nautical miles (6 km) southeast of its central business district.

== Communities ==
=== Cities ===
- Magnolia (county seat)

=== Towns ===
- Emerson
- McNeil
- Taylor
- Waldo

=== Unincorporated communities ===
- Atlanta
- Big Creek
- Brister
- Bussey
- Calhoun
- Jefferson
- Lamartine
- Plainfield
- Village
- Walkerville
- Welcome

=== Townships ===
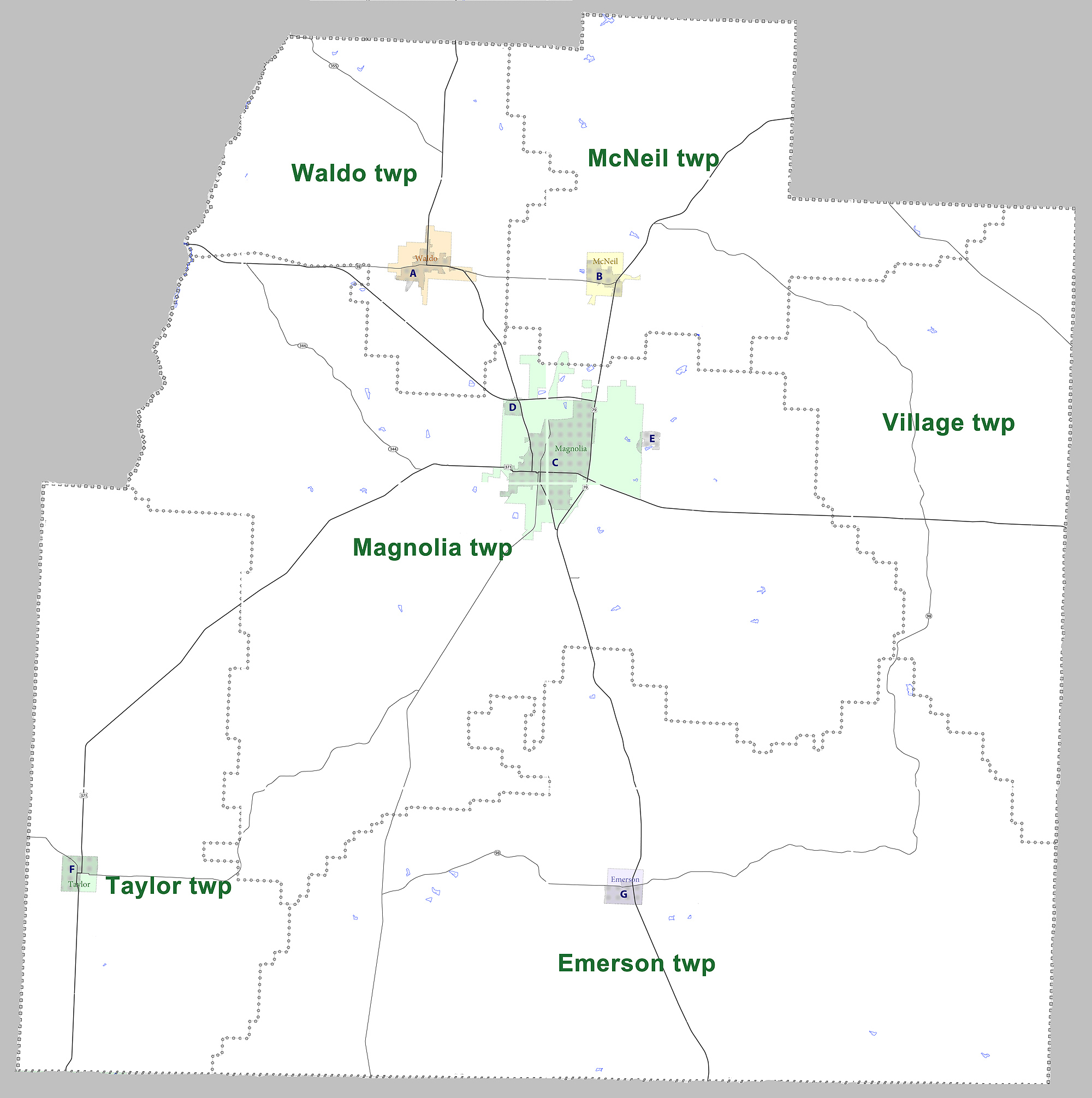
Townships in Columbia County, Arkansas as of 2010

Townships in Arkansas are the divisions of a county. Each township includes unincorporated areas; some may have incorporated cities or towns within part of their boundaries. Arkansas townships have limited purposes in modern times. However, the United States census does list Arkansas population based on townships (sometimes referred to as "county subdivisions" or "minor civil divisions"). Townships are also of value for historical purposes in terms of genealogical research. Each town or city is within one or more townships in an Arkansas county based on census maps and publications. The townships of Columbia County are listed below; listed in parentheses are the cities, towns, and/or census-designated places that are fully or partially inside the township.

- Emerson (Emerson)
- McNeil (McNeil)
- Magnolia (Magnolia)
- Taylor (Taylor)
- Village
- Waldo (Waldo)

== Education ==
School districts include:

- Emerson-Taylor-Bradley School District
- Lafayette County School District - Formed in 2003 when the Lewisville School District and the Stamps School District merged.
- Magnolia School District
- Smackover-Norphlet School District - Formerly Smackover School District until the Norphlet School District merged into it in 2014

Private schools include:

- Columbia Christian School

Former school districts:

- The Emerson-Taylor School District formed in 2004 when the Emerson School District and the Taylor School District merged. It became the Emerson-Taylor-Bradley in 2013 after the Bradley School District merged into it.
- Stephens School District - Dissolved in 2014, with the Magnolia district taking the portion in Columbia County.
- Waldo School District - Merged into the Magnolia district in 2006.

== Government and politics ==
=== Government ===
The county government is a constitutional body granted specific powers by the Constitution of Arkansas and the Arkansas Code. The quorum court is the legislative branch of the county government and controls all spending and revenue collection. Representatives are called justices of the peace and are elected from county districts every even-numbered year. The number of districts in a county vary from nine to fifteen, and district boundaries are drawn by the county election commission. The Columbia County Quorum Court has eleven members. Presiding over quorum court meetings is the county judge, who serves as the chief operating officer of the county. The county judge is elected at-large and does not vote in quorum court business, although capable of vetoing quorum court decisions.

Columbia County, Arkansas Elected countywide officials
Position	Officeholder	Party
County Judge	Doug Fields	Republican
County Clerk	Tammy Kimble Wiltz	Republican
Circuit Clerk	Lisa Lewis	(Unknown)
Sheriff	Leroy Martin II	Independent
Treasurer	Selena Blair	Republican
Collector	Rachel Waller	Republican
Assessor	Shannon Hair	Republican
Coroner	Randy Reed	Democratic

The composition of the Quorum Court following the 2024 elections is 9 Republicans and 2 Democrats. Justices of the Peace (members) of the Quorum Court following the elections are:

- District 1: Virginia Pate (R)
- District 2: Mark Gullenwider (R)
- District 3: Jason Clark (R)
- District 4: Penny Cook (R)
- District 5: Ricky Waller (R)
- District 6: Jeremy Dodson (R)
- District 7: Oliver Thomas (D)
- District 8: Terry Williams (D)
- District 9: Charles Michael Henderson (R)
- District 10: Lynn Story (R)
- District 11: Mike Loe (R)

Additionally, the townships of Columbia County are entitled to elect their own respective constables, as set forth by the Constitution of Arkansas. Constables are largely of historical significance as they were used to keep the peace in rural areas when travel was more difficult. The township constables as of the 2024 elections are:

- Columbia North: Charles Holt (R)
- Columbia South: Jimmy Holt (R)
- Emerson: Dusty Shepherd (R)
- Magnolia: Randall Adams (R)
- McNeil: Charles E. Beckham III (R)
- Taylor: Hunter Scott (R)
- Waldo: Truman Young (D)

=== Politics ===
Columbia County's political history is deeply unusual for a county dominated by a university, as it is deeply conservative despite most college counties being Democratic strongholds. Like most fellow Southern counties, Columbia County was once a Democratic stronghold during the 19th century and most of the 20th century, before shifting rapidly towards Republicans in the late 20th century. While other Southern counties remained solidly Republican, Columbia County joined several of its fellow Arkansan counties in voting for native son Bill Clinton before it continued shifting towards Republicans in the 21st century. Republicans have generally seen slowly increasing margins (with the exception of a 0.1% decrease in 2008), with Donald Trump securing nearly 68% of the vote in 2024, the best result a Republican has ever seen in the county other than Richard Nixon's 1972 landslide.

In 2014, voters overturned a 71-year-old prohibition against the sale of alcoholic beverages in the county.

United States presidential election results for Columbia County, Arkansas
Year	Republican		Democratic		Third party(ies)	
Year	No.	%	No.	%	No.	%
1896	537	19.84%	2,159	79.76%	11	0.41%
1900	606	29.39%	1,440	69.84%	16	0.78%
1904	554	27.29%	1,445	71.18%	31	1.53%
1908	817	33.21%	1,613	65.57%	30	1.22%
1912	340	20.61%	1,101	66.73%	209	12.67%
1916	721	25.80%	2,074	74.20%	0	0.00%
1920	857	29.29%	2,052	70.13%	17	0.58%
1924	350	19.50%	1,382	76.99%	63	3.51%
1928	617	26.03%	1,752	73.92%	1	0.04%
1932	85	3.38%	2,420	96.22%	10	0.40%
1936	64	3.35%	1,847	96.65%	0	0.00%
1940	149	6.15%	2,270	93.72%	3	0.12%
1944	394	15.49%	2,145	84.35%	4	0.16%
1948	217	7.28%	1,788	59.98%	976	32.74%
1952	1,931	36.44%	3,359	63.39%	9	0.17%
1956	2,342	43.42%	2,845	52.74%	207	3.84%
1960	2,372	42.32%	2,427	43.30%	806	14.38%
1964	4,009	53.22%	3,485	46.26%	39	0.52%
1968	1,916	23.24%	2,487	30.16%	3,843	46.60%
1972	5,801	72.30%	2,193	27.33%	29	0.36%
1976	4,287	47.63%	4,708	52.31%	6	0.07%
1980	5,259	52.76%	4,445	44.60%	263	2.64%
1984	6,526	63.45%	3,680	35.78%	79	0.77%
1988	5,810	59.27%	3,706	37.81%	286	2.92%
1992	3,702	37.70%	4,747	48.35%	1,370	13.95%
1996	3,376	37.59%	4,730	52.66%	876	9.75%
2000	5,018	53.92%	4,003	43.01%	286	3.07%
2004	5,729	57.82%	4,108	41.46%	72	0.73%
2008	5,861	61.32%	3,554	37.18%	143	1.50%
2012	5,790	61.24%	3,557	37.62%	108	1.14%
2016	5,456	61.39%	3,140	35.33%	291	3.27%
2020	5,500	63.83%	2,814	32.66%	302	3.51%
2024	5,367	67.59%	2,466	31.06%	107	1.35%

== See also ==
- Arkansas Highway 344 (1973–1978), former state highway in Columbia County
- List of lakes in Columbia County, Arkansas
- National Register of Historic Places listings in Columbia County, Arkansas
