= Lumber, West Virginia =

Lumber
- Unincorporated community
- Location within the state of West Virginia Lumber (the United States)
- Coordinates: 38°54′53″N 79°46′26″W
- Country: United States
- State: West Virginia
- County: Randolph
- Elevation: 2,126 ft (648 m)
- Time zone: UTC-5 (Eastern (EST))
  - Summer (DST): UTC-4 (EDT)
- GNIS ID: 1727097

Lumber was an unincorporated community in Randolph County, West Virginia.
