= Bradley, Arkansas =

- City
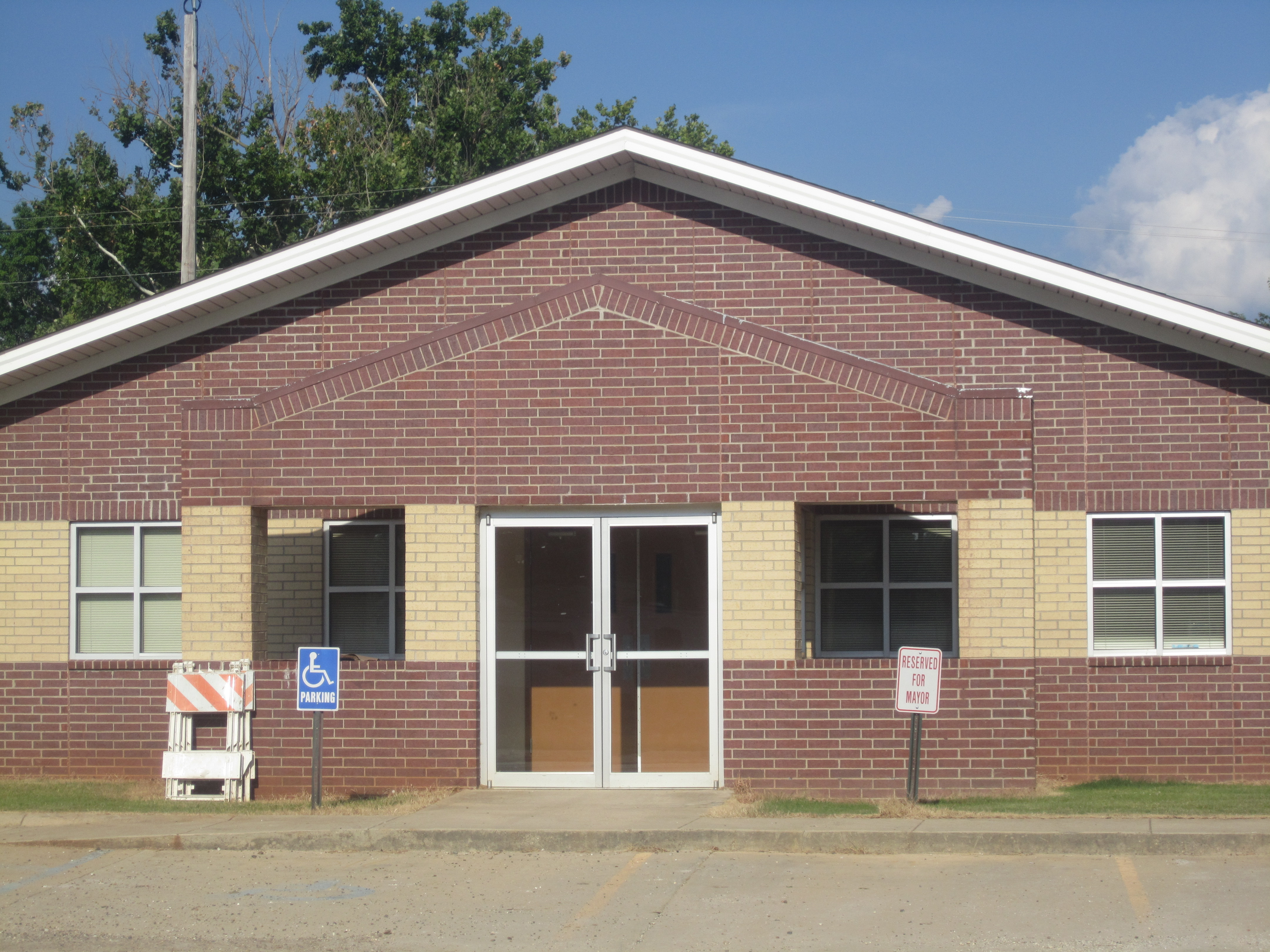
- Bradley City Hall

- Location in Lafayette County, Arkansas
- Coordinates: 33°05′58″N 93°39′25″W
- Country: United States
- State: Arkansas
- County: Lafayette

Area
  - Total: 0.91 sq mi (2.36 km^{2})
  - Land: 0.91 sq mi (2.36 km^{2})
  - Water: 0 sq mi (0.00 km^{2})
- Elevation: 259 ft (79 m)

Population (2020)
  - Total: 405
  - Estimate (2025): 380 ▼
  - Density: 444/sq mi (171.3/km^{2})
- Time zone: UTC−06:00 (Central (CST))
  - Summer (DST): UTC−05:00 (CDT)
- ZIP Code: 71826
- Area code: 870
- FIPS code: 05-08290
- GNIS feature ID: 2403911

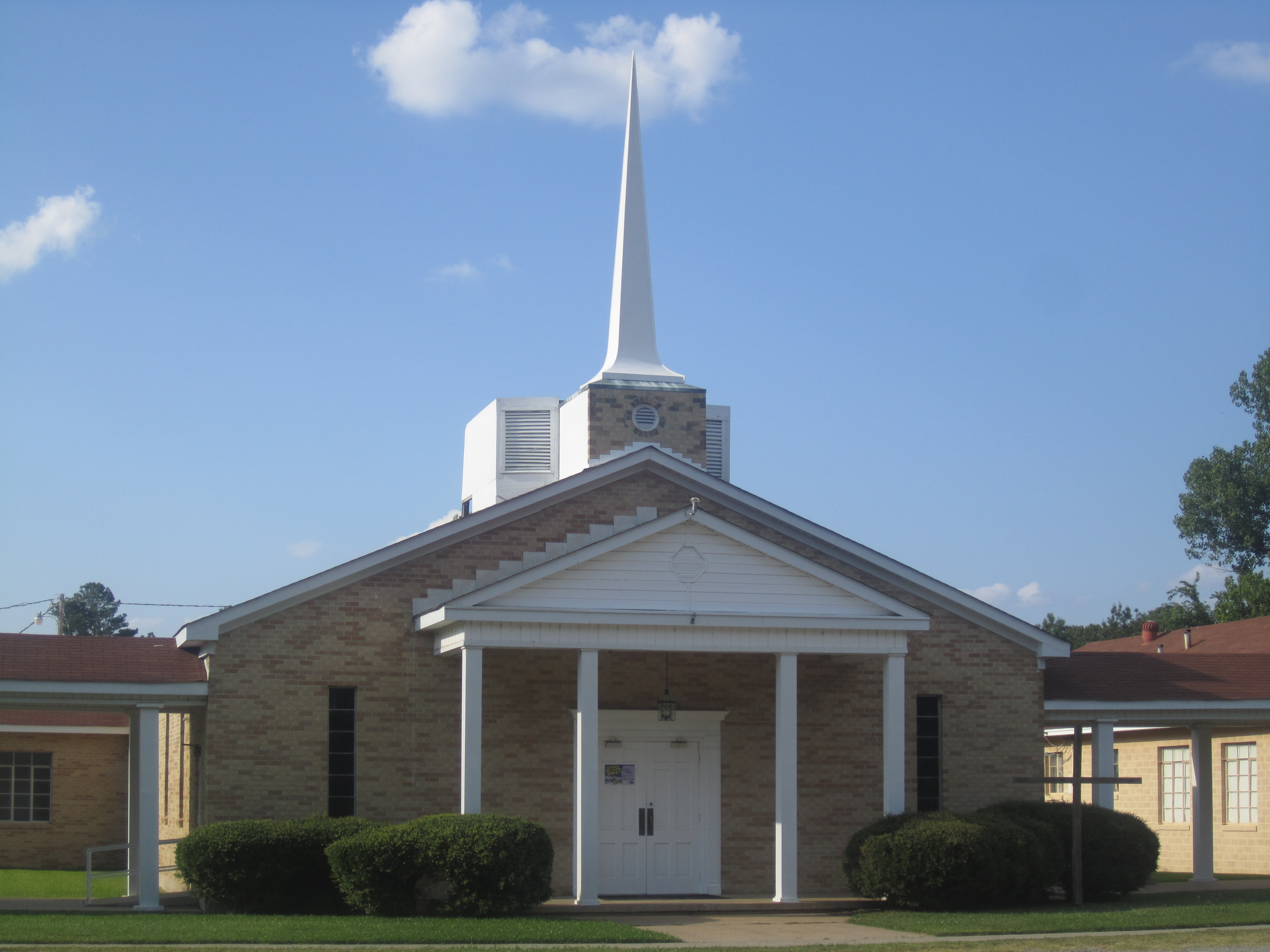
Bradley Baptist Church

Bradley is a city in Lafayette County, Arkansas, United States. As of the 2020 census, Bradley had a population of 405.

== Geography ==
Bradley is located in southern Lafayette County. It sits at the intersection of Arkansas Highways 29 and 160. Highway 29 leads north 19 miles (31 km) to Lewisville and south 6 miles (10 km) to the Louisiana border at Arkana. Plain Dealing, Louisiana, is 14 miles (23 km) south of Bradley. Highway 160 leads east from Bradley 7 miles (11 km) to the community of State Line and west 15 miles (24 km) to Interstate 49 near Doddridge.

According to the United States Census Bureau, Bradley has a total area of 0.93 square miles (2.4 km^{2}), all land.

== Demographics ==
Historical population
Census	Pop.	Note	%±
1910	123		—
1920	290		135.8%
1930	363		25.2%
1940	409		12.7%
1950	444		8.6%
1960	712		60.4%
1970	706		−0.8%
1980	790		11.9%
1990	585		−25.9%
2000	563		−3.8%
2010	628		11.5%
2020	405		−35.5%
2025 (est.)	380	▼	−6.2%
U.S. Decennial Census

=== 2020 Census ===
Bradley, Arkansas – Racial and ethnic composition Note: the U.S. census treats Hispanic/Latino as an ethnic category. This table excludes Latinos from the racial categories and assigns them to a separate category. Hispanics/Latinos may be of any race.
Race / Ethnicity (NH = Non-Hispanic)	Pop 2000	Pop 2010	Pop 2020	% 2000	% 2010	% 2020
White alone (NH)	261	263	165	46.36%	41.88%	40.74%
Black or African American alone (NH)	291	353	222	51.69%	56.21%	54.81%
Native American or Alaska Native alone (NH)	0	1	0	0.00%	0.16%	0.00%
Asian alone (NH)	2	1	1	0.36%	0.16%	0.25%
Pacific Islander alone (NH)	0	0	0	0.00%	0.00%	0.00%
Other race alone (NH)	0	0	0	0.00%	0.00%	0.00%
Mixed race or Multiracial (NH)	5	1	8	0.89%	0.16%	1.98%
Hispanic or Latino (any race)	4	9	9	0.71%	1.43%	2.22%
Total	563	628	405	100.00%	100.00%	100.00%

As of the census of 2000, there were 563 people, 223 households, and 134 families residing in the city. The population density was 614.8 inhabitants per square mile (237.4/km^{2}). There were 285 housing units at an average density of 311.2 per square mile (120.2/km^{2}). The racial makeup of the city was 46.36% White, 52.40% Black or African American, 0.36% Asian, and 0.89% from two or more races. 0.71% of the population were Hispanic or Latino of any race.

There were 223 households, out of which 30.0% had children under the age of 18 living with them, 32.7% were married couples living together, 22.4% had a female householder with no husband present, and 39.9% were non-families. 37.2% of all households were made up of individuals, and 20.6% had someone living alone who was 65 years of age or older. The average household size was 2.52 and the average family size was 3.38.

In the city, the population was spread out, with 33.6% under the age of 18, 9.6% from 18 to 24, 23.1% from 25 to 44, 17.9% from 45 to 64, and 15.8% who were 65 years of age or older. The median age was 31 years. For every 100 females, there were 80.4 males. For every 100 females age 18 and over, there were 70.8 males.

As of 2023, the median income for a household in the city was $30,732, and the median income for a family was $31,944.

== Education ==
Public education for elementary and secondary students is provided by the Emerson-Taylor-Bradley School District, which includes Bradley Elementary School and Bradley High School. The school's mascot and athletic emblem is the Bear, with purple and gold serving as the school colors.

The former Bradley School District consolidated into the Emerson-Taylor district effective July 1, 2013.

== Infrastructure ==
=== Highways ===
- Arkansas Highway 29
- Arkansas Highway 160
