= Jefferson, Columbia County, Arkansas =

Jefferson, Arkansas
- Unincorporated community
- Location within Arkansas Location within the United States
- Coordinates: 33°21′04″N 93°22′08″W
- Country: United States
- State: Arkansas
- County: Columbia
- Elevation: 335 ft (102 m)
- Time zone: UTC-6 (Central (CST))
  - Summer (DST): UTC-5 (CDT)
- Area code: 870
- GNIS feature ID: 57984

Jefferson is an unincorporated community in Columbia County, Arkansas, United States. Jefferson is located on U.S. Route 82, 4 miles (6.4 km) east of Buckner, and about 7 miles (11 km) northwest of Magnolia.
