= Bradley School District =

Defunct school district in Arkansas, United States

Coordinates: 33.1010°N 93.6604°W

Bradley School District 20 was a school district based in Bradley, Arkansas, United States.

The school district encompassed 245.34 square miles (635.4 km^{2}) of land in Lafayette County and supported all of Bradley. The final superintendent was Gammye Moore.

== History ==
By 2013 the Bradley district had only 357 students. The state had a law stating that a merger would be forced if any school district had fewer than 350 students for three or more years. Gary Hines, the superintendent of Emerson-Taylor, had argued in favor of the consolidation with his district, citing the proximity between Bradley and Taylor. The Emerson-Taylor School District and the Bradley school district jointly requested a merger. In May 2013 the Arkansas Board of Education approved the district's merger with the Emerson-Taylor district, resulting in the Emerson-Taylor-Bradley School District effective July 1, 2013. In the hearing on consolidation, Mark Keith, the superintendent of the Lafayette County School District, argued that Bradley should have consolidated with his district and stated his opposition to the consolidation with Emerson-Taylor. Moore became the assistant superintendent of Emerson-Taylor-Bradley.

== Schools ==
- Bradley Elementary School, serving prekindergarten through grade 6.
- Bradley High School, serving grades 7 through 12.
