= Taylor School District (Arkansas) =

Defunct school district in Arkansas, United States

Taylor School District or Taylor Public Schools was a school district headquartered in Taylor, Arkansas. It operated Taylor Elementary School and Taylor High School.

On July 1, 2004, it consolidated with the Emerson School District to form the Emerson-Taylor School District (now the Emerson-Taylor-Bradley School District).
