= Bradley High School (Arkansas) =

Location
- 521 School Street; Bradley, Arkansas 71826; United States; 33°37′26″N 92°3′40″W

Information
- School type: Public comprehensive
- Status: Open
- School district: Emerson-Taylor-Bradley School District
- NCES District ID: 0500068
- Oversight: Arkansas Department of Education (ADE)
- CEEB code: 040268
- NCES School ID: 050006800109
- Teaching staff: 20.53 (FTE)
- Grades: 7-12
- Enrollment: 144 (2023-2024)
- Student to teacher ratio: 7.01
- Education system: ADE Smart Core curriculum
- Classes offered: Regular, Advanced Placement
- Campus type: Rural
- Colors: Purple and gold
- Athletics conference: 1A District 8 (2018-Present)
- Sports: Basketball, baseball, softball
- Mascot: Bear
- Nickname: BHS
- Team name: Bradley Bears
- Rival: Taylor High School, Fouke High School
- Accreditation: AdvancED (1965-)
- Feeder schools: Nettleton Junior High School (6-8)
- Affiliation: Arkansas Activities Association (AAA)
- Website: bradley.etbsd.org/apps/pages/index.jsp?uREC_ID=1633823&type=d&pREC_ID=1774634

Bradley High School (BHS) is a comprehensive public junior/senior high school located in Bradley, Arkansas, United States. For the 2017-2018 school year, BHS serves more than 24 students in grades 7 through 12 and is supported by more than 15 educators on a full time equivalent basis. Bradley High is the smaller of two public high schools in Lafayette County and draws students from Bradley. It is one of three high schools of the Emerson-Taylor-Bradley School District.

== History ==
Initially it was a part of the Bradley School District. On July 1, 2013, it consolidated with the Emerson-Taylor School District to form the Emerson-Taylor-Bradley School District.

== Academics ==
The high school is fully accredited by the Arkansas Department of Education (ADE). The assumed course of study for students is to complete the ADE Smart Core curriculum that requires at least 22 units prior to graduation. Students complete regular (core and career focus) courses and exams and may select Advanced Placement (AP) coursework and exams that provide an opportunity for college credit prior to high school graduation.

The Adequate Yearly Progress measures for Bradley High School using the Augmented Benchmark Examinations are as follows:

- 2008–09: Achieving
- 2009–10: First Year Not To Meet Standards (Alert)
- 2010–11: Year One of Whole School Improvement

== Extracurricular activities ==
The Bradley High School mascot and athletic emblem is the Bear with purple and gold serving as the school colors. The Future Farmers of America (FFA) Nursery/Landscape Team has 2 state championships, the Forestry Team has 2, and the Floriculture team has 2, their last coming in 2020.

=== Athletics ===
For 2018–Present, the Bradley Bears participate in the 1A Classification—the state's smallest classification—within the 1A 8 Conference as administered by the Arkansas Activities Association. The Bears compete in boys and girls basketball, baseball and softball. The Senior Girls basketball team has six state championships and the Senior Boys basketball team has one. The baseball team also has one state championship. Even though the boys and girls track and field teams were discontinued, the boys have five state championships.

== See also ==
- Bradley School District
