= Emerson School District (Arkansas) =

Defunct school district in Arkansas, United States

Location
- Emerson Arkansas; United States

District information
- Closed: July 1, 2004

Emerson School District or Emerson Public Schools was a school district headquartered in Emerson, Arkansas. It operated Emerson Elementary School, Emerson Middle School, and Emerson High School.

On July 1, 2004, it consolidated with the Taylor School District to form the Emerson-Taylor School District (now the Emerson-Taylor-Bradley School District).
