= National Register of Historic Places listings in Ashley County, Arkansas =

Location of Ashley County in Arkansas

This is a list of the National Register of Historic Places listings in Ashley County, Arkansas.

This is intended to be a complete list of the properties on the National Register of Historic Places in Ashley County, Arkansas, United States. The locations of National Register properties for which the latitude and longitude coordinates are included below, may be seen in a map.

There are 28 properties listed on the National Register in the county. Another two properties were once listed but have been removed.

Contents: Counties in Arkansas
- Arkansas
- Ashley
- Baxter
- Benton
- Boone
- Bradley
- Calhoun
- Carroll
- Chicot
- Clark
- Clay
- Cleburne
- Cleveland
- Columbia
- Conway
- Craighead
- Crawford
- Crittenden
- Cross
- Dallas
- Desha
- Drew
- Faulkner
- Franklin
- Fulton
- Garland
- Grant
- Greene
- Hempstead
- Hot Spring
- Howard
- Independence
- Izard
- Jackson
- Jefferson
- Johnson
- Lafayette
- Lawrence
- Lee
- Lincoln
- Little River
- Logan
- Lonoke
- Madison
- Marion
- Miller
- Mississippi
- Monroe
- Montgomery
- Nevada
- Newton
- Ouachita
- Perry
- Phillips
- Pike
- Poinsett
- Polk
- Pope
- Prairie
- Pulaski (Little Rock)
- Randolph
- St. Francis
- Saline
- Scott
- Searcy
- Sebastian
- Sevier
- Sharp
- Stone
- Union
- Van Buren
- Washington
- White
- Woodruff
- Yell

This National Park Service list is complete through NPS recent listings posted December 19, 2025.

== Current listings ==
| | Name on the Register | Image | Date listed | Location | City or town | Description |
|---|---|---|---|---|---|---|
| 1 | Ashley County Courthouse | Ashley County Courthouse | September 26, 2023 (#100009391) | 205 East Jefferson St. 33°13′37″N 91°47′45″W | Hamburg | |
| 2 | Bethel Cemetery | | June 5, 2017 (#100001003) | At the end of Bethel Rd., 3.5 miles (5.6 km) N. of the jct. of AR 52 & AR 53; 33°12′56″N 91°55′21″W | Crossett vicinity | |
| 3 | W.R. Bunckley House | | March 17, 1994 (#94000189) | 509 E. Parker St. 33°13′23″N 91°44′12″W | Hamburg | |
| 4 | Crossett Experimental Forest Building No. 2 | Crossett Experimental Forest Building No. 2 | October 20, 1993 (#93001084) | Highway 133 south of Crossett; 33°02′03″N 91°56′22″W | Crossett | |
| 5 | Crossett Experimental Forest Building No. 6 | Crossett Experimental Forest Building No. 6 | October 20, 1993 (#93001085) | Highway 133 south of Crossett; 33°01′58″N 91°56′19″W | Crossett | |
| 6 | Crossett Experimental Forest Building No. 8 | Crossett Experimental Forest Building No. 8 | October 20, 1993 (#93001086) | Highway 133 south of Crossett; 33°02′00″N 91°56′19″W | Crossett | |
| 7 | Crossett Methodist Church | Crossett Methodist Church | February 17, 2010 (#10000018) | 500 Main St. 33°07′47″N 91°57′41″W | Crossett | |
| 8 | Crossett Municipal Auditorium | Crossett Municipal Auditorium | September 20, 2007 (#07000965) | 1100 Main St. 33°07′16″N 91°57′40″W | Crossett | |
| 9 | Crossett Municipal Building | Crossett Municipal Building | September 20, 2007 (#07000966) | 307-309 Main St. 33°07′41″N 91°57′41″W | Crossett | |
| 10 | Crossett Post Office | Crossett Post Office | January 8, 2003 (#02001673) | 125 Main St. 33°08′02″N 91°57′39″W | Crossett | |
| 11 | Edward C. Crossett Youth Center | | January 24, 2024 (#100009337) | 300 North Dr. Martin Luther King Jr. Dr. 33°07′56″N 91°58′02″W | Crossett | |
| 12 | Crossroads Fire Tower | Crossroads Fire Tower | March 2, 2006 (#06000078) | 2262 Highway 133 N. 33°13′58″N 91°55′28″W | Hamburg | |
| 13 | Dean House | Dean House | December 22, 1982 (#82000797) | Off U.S. Highway 165; 33°14′22″N 91°30′46″W | Portland | |
| 14 | First United Methodist Church | First United Methodist Church | April 27, 1992 (#92000388) | 204 S. Main; 33°13′29″N 91°47′52″W | Hamburg | |
| 15 | John P. Fisher House | John P. Fisher House | September 29, 1995 (#95001141) | Junction of Highway 160 and County Road 50, west of Bayou Bartholomew Bridge; 33°14′19″N 91°32′16″W | Portland | |
| 16 | Hamburg Cemetery Historic Section | Hamburg Cemetery Historic Section | September 23, 2011 (#11000684) | 800 E. Parker St. 33°13′26″N 91°47′10″W | Hamburg | |
| 17 | Hamburg Commercial Historic District | Hamburg Commercial Historic District | March 23, 2009 (#08001333) | 100-200 block of E. Adams, 100 block of N. Mulberry, 201 S. Mulberry, and 201 and 205 N. Main St. 33°13′35″N 91°47′48″W | Hamburg | |
| 18 | Hamburg Presbyterian Church | Hamburg Presbyterian Church | May 14, 1991 (#91000589) | Junction of Cherry and Lincoln Sts. 33°13′32″N 91°47′40″W | Hamburg | |
| 19 | Dr. M.C. Hawkins House | Dr. M.C. Hawkins House | March 28, 1996 (#96000310) | 4684 Highway 8; 33°07′14″N 91°32′53″W | Parkdale | |
| 20 | Naff House | Naff House | July 24, 1992 (#92000957) | Northwestern corner of the junction of 3rd Ave. and Fir St. 33°14′18″N 91°30′10″W | Portland | |
| 21 | Parkdale Baptist Church-AS0051 | Parkdale Baptist Church-AS0051 | January 24, 2007 (#06001285) | 127 Bride St. 33°07′22″N 91°32′57″W | Parkdale | |
| 22 | Parkdale Methodist Church | Parkdale Methodist Church | June 5, 2007 (#07000505) | S. Church St. 33°07′12″N 91°32′58″W | Parkdale | |
| 23 | Portland United Methodist Church | Portland United Methodist Church | October 18, 2006 (#06000942) | 300 N. Main St. 33°14′28″N 91°30′41″W | Portland | |
| 24 | Pugh House | Pugh House | December 22, 1982 (#82000798) | Off U.S. Highway 165; 33°14′19″N 91°30′48″W | Portland | |
| 25 | Sumner-White Dipping Vat | | March 2, 2006 (#06000087) | 4 miles east of the junction of U.S. Highway 82 and County Road 69; 0.5 miles south in the woods at the Hunt Camp; 33°21′05″N 91°39′14″W | Hamburg | |
| 26 | Watson House | Watson House | December 28, 1977 (#77000242) | 300 N. Cherry; 33°13′37″N 91°47′40″W | Hamburg | |
| 27 | Watson-Sawyer House | Watson-Sawyer House | December 6, 1975 (#75000373) | 502 E. Parker St. 33°13′25″N 91°47′36″W | Hamburg | |
| 28 | Dr. Robert George Williams House | Dr. Robert George Williams House | October 4, 1984 (#84000002) | Highways 8 and 209; 33°07′17″N 91°32′56″W | Parkdale | |

== Former listings ==
| | Name on the Register | Image | Date listed | Date removed | Location | City or town | Description |
|---|---|---|---|---|---|---|---|
| 1 | Greenview Cafe | | January 19, 2005 (#04001507) | January 23, 2008 | 3rd Avenue and Arkansas Street; 33°07′56″N 91°57′52″W | Crossett | |
| 2 | Wiggins Cabin | | September 30, 1982 (#82002093) | December 28, 2002 | City Park | Crossett | Destroyed by fire August 24, 2002 |

== See also ==
- List of National Historic Landmarks in Arkansas
- National Register of Historic Places listings in Arkansas
