= Arkansas Highway 133 =

State highway in Arkansas, United States

Highway 133

Route information
- Maintained by ArDOT

Section 1
- Length: 24.20 mi (38.95 km)
- South end: LA 142 at Louisiana state line near Crossett
- North end: AR 8 near Fountain Hill

Section 2
- Length: 6.29 mi (10.12 km)
- South end: AR 160 near Fountain Hill
- North end: US 425 in Lacey

Section 3
- Length: 12.51 mi (20.13 km)
- South end: AR 35 in Rison
- North end: AR 54 near Pinebergen

Location
- Country: United States
- State: Arkansas
- Counties: Ashley, Cleveland, Drew, Jefferson

Highway system
- Arkansas Highway System; Interstate; US; State; Business; Spurs; Suffixed; Scenic; Heritage
← AR 132	→ AR 134

Arkansas Highway 133 (AR 133, Hwy. 133) is a designation for three state highways in South Arkansas. One route of 24.20 miles (38.95 km) runs from Louisiana Highway 142 north through Crossett to Highway 8 near Fountain Hill. A second segment runs from Highway 160 north to US Route 425 (US 425) at Lacey. A third segment begins in Rison at Highway 35 and runs north to Highway 54 south of Pine Bluff.

== Route description ==
=== Louisiana to Highway 8 ===
The route begins at Louisiana Highway 142 at the Louisiana state line and runs north through rural Ashely County. It passes by three properties on the National Register of Historic Places (NRHP) near the Arkansas Forest Commission building: Crossett Experimental Forest Building No. 2, Building No. 6, and Building No. 8. Entering Crossett the highway becomes Main Street and passes by several properties on the National Register including the Municipal Auditorium, Municipal Building, Methodist Church, and Post Office. Highway 133 also has a junction with Highway 133 Truck, which gives access to US 82 as a truck route through Crossett. The highway intersects US 82, forming a concurrency east for five blocks.

After the concurrency ends Highway 133 continues north to North Crossett where it meets Highway 133 Spur near an industrial area and Highway 52. The highway continues through wooded areas as an alternating passing lane highway, including a junction Highway 189 near Old Milo. Continuing north the route terminates at Highway 8 near Fountain Hill.

=== Highway 160 to US 425 ===
Highway 133 begins at Highway 160 west of Fountain Hill and runs northeast through heavily forested country. The route terminates at US 425 at Lacey in south Drew County. Highway 133 does not have any intersections with other state highways between its termini. Traffic counts from the Arkansas State Highway and Transportation Department (AHTD) from 2010 indicate that this segment of state highway averages 360 vehicles per day (VPD).

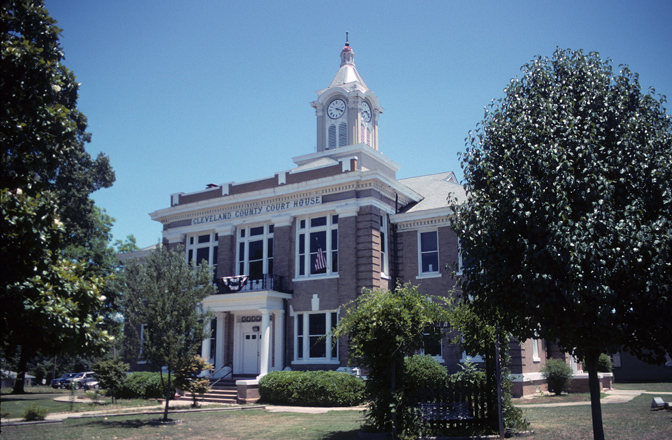
Highway 133 runs within a block of the Cleveland County Courthouse.

== Rison to Highway 53 ==
The highway begins in Rison at Highway 35 near the Rison Cities Service Station. Highway 133 runs north as Magnolia Street past the Hall Morgan Post 83, American Legion Hut and the Cleveland County Courthouse before exiting Rison to the northeast. Winding northeast through forested land the route enters Jefferson County and terminates at Highway 54.

Traffic counts from the AHTD from 2010 show that an average of 890 vehicles per day use Highway 133 in the city limits of Rison. The traffic average drops once outside of town, as low as 750 VPD near the northern terminus.

== Major intersections ==
Mile markers reset at concurrencies.

County	Location	mi	km	Destinations	Notes
Ashley		0.00	0.00	LA 142 – Bastrop	Southern terminus
Ashley	Crossett	7.93	12.76	AR 133T north (Dr Martin Luther King Jr Drive) to US 82	Truck route
Ashley	Crossett	9.15	14.73	US 82 west (1st Avenue) – El Dorado	
Ashley	Crossett	US 82 concurrency east, 0.5 miles (0.80 km)			
Ashley	Crossett	0.00	0.00	US 82 east (Unity Road) to US 425 – Hamburg, Lake Village	
Ashley	North Crossett	1.07	1.72	AR 133S north	
Ashley	North Crossett	2.38	3.83	AR 52 east – Hamburg	
Ashley	Duckworth Spur	11.77	18.94	AR 189 south – Hamburg	
Ashley	Long View	15.05	24.22	AR 8 – Fountain Hill, Warren	Northern terminus
Ashley	Highway 133 begins at Highway 160				
Ashley		0.00	0.00	AR 160 – Fountain Hill, Johnsville	Southern terminus
Drew	Lacey	6.29	10.12	US 425 – Monticello, Hamburg	Northern terminus
Highway 133 begins in Rison
Cleveland	Rison	0.00	0.00	AR 35 (Main Street)	Southern terminus
Jefferson		12.51	20.13	AR 54	Northern terminus
1.000 mi = 1.609 km; 1.000 km = 0.621 mi: Concurrency terminus

== Crossett truck route ==
Highway 133T
- Location: Crossett
- Length: 1.46 mi (2.35 km)

Arkansas Highway 133 Truck (AR 133T, Hwy. 133T) is a truck route of 1.46 miles (2.35 km) in Crossett. Running as Florida Street the highway begins at Highway 133 and ends at US 82.

=== Major intersections ===
The entire route is in Crossett, Ashley County.

mi	km	Destinations	Notes
0.00	0.00	AR 133	Southern terminus
1.46	2.35	US 82 (1st Avenue)	Northern terminus
1.000 mi = 1.609 km; 1.000 km = 0.621 mi

== North Crossett spur ==
Highway 133S
- Location: North Crossett
- Length: 0.53 mi (850 m)

Arkansas Highway 133 Spur (AR 133S, Hwy. 133S) is a spur route of 0.53 miles (0.85 km) in North Crossett. Its southern terminus is at Highway 133 and the route runs north through an industrial park to Wood Street.

=== Major intersections ===
The entire route is in North Crossett, Ashley County.

mi	km	Destinations	Notes
0.00	0.00	AR 133	Southern terminus
0.53	0.85	Wood Street	Northern terminus
1.000 mi = 1.609 km; 1.000 km = 0.621 mi

== See also ==
- List of state highways in Arkansas
