= Dr. M.C. Hawkins House =

Historic house in Arkansas, United States

- Dr. M. C. Hawkins House
- U.S. National Register of Historic Places
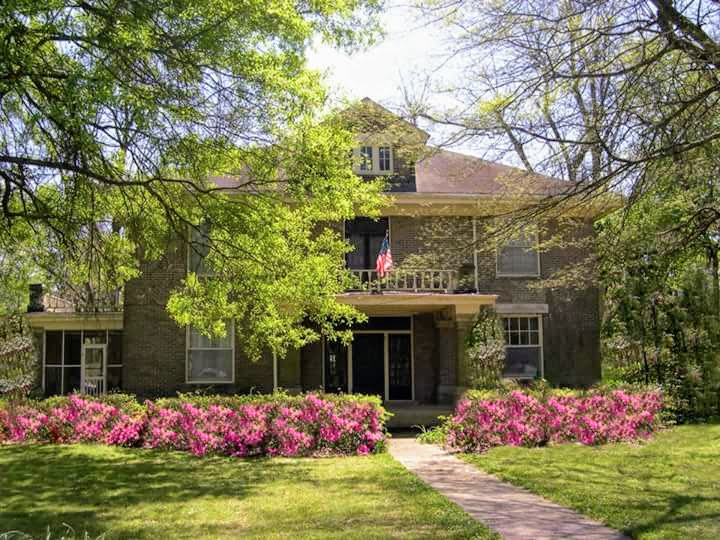
- M. C. Hawkins House in the springtime.

- Location within Arkansas Location within the United States
- Location: 4684 AR 8, Parkdale, Arkansas
- Coordinates: 33°7′14″N 91°32′53″W
- Area: 2 acres (0.81 ha)
- Built: 1912
- Architect: Gibb, Frank; Terry, W.R.
- Architectural style: Prairie School
- NRHP reference No.: 96000310
- Added to NRHP: March 28, 1996

The Dr. M.C. Hawkins House is a historic house at 4684 Arkansas Highway 8 in Parkdale, Arkansas. Built 1911–12, it is an excellent example of a Prairie School house designed by Little Rock architect Frank W. Gibb. It is a two-story structure faced in brick veneer, laid out in a T shape. The rectangular main block has a hip roof, while the kitchen wing, which extends to the rear, has a gabled roof. The main entrance is centered on the front facade, and is sheltered by a porch supported by brick columns and pilasters. The top of this porch functions as a deck, surrounded by brick posts and a simple wooden balustrade, which was originally a more complex jigsawn design.

The house was listed on the National Register of Historic Places in 1996.

== See also ==
- National Register of Historic Places listings in Ashley County, Arkansas
