= Hamburg Cemetery =

Historic cemetery in Arkansas, United States

- Hamburg Cemetery, Historic Section
- U.S. National Register of Historic Places
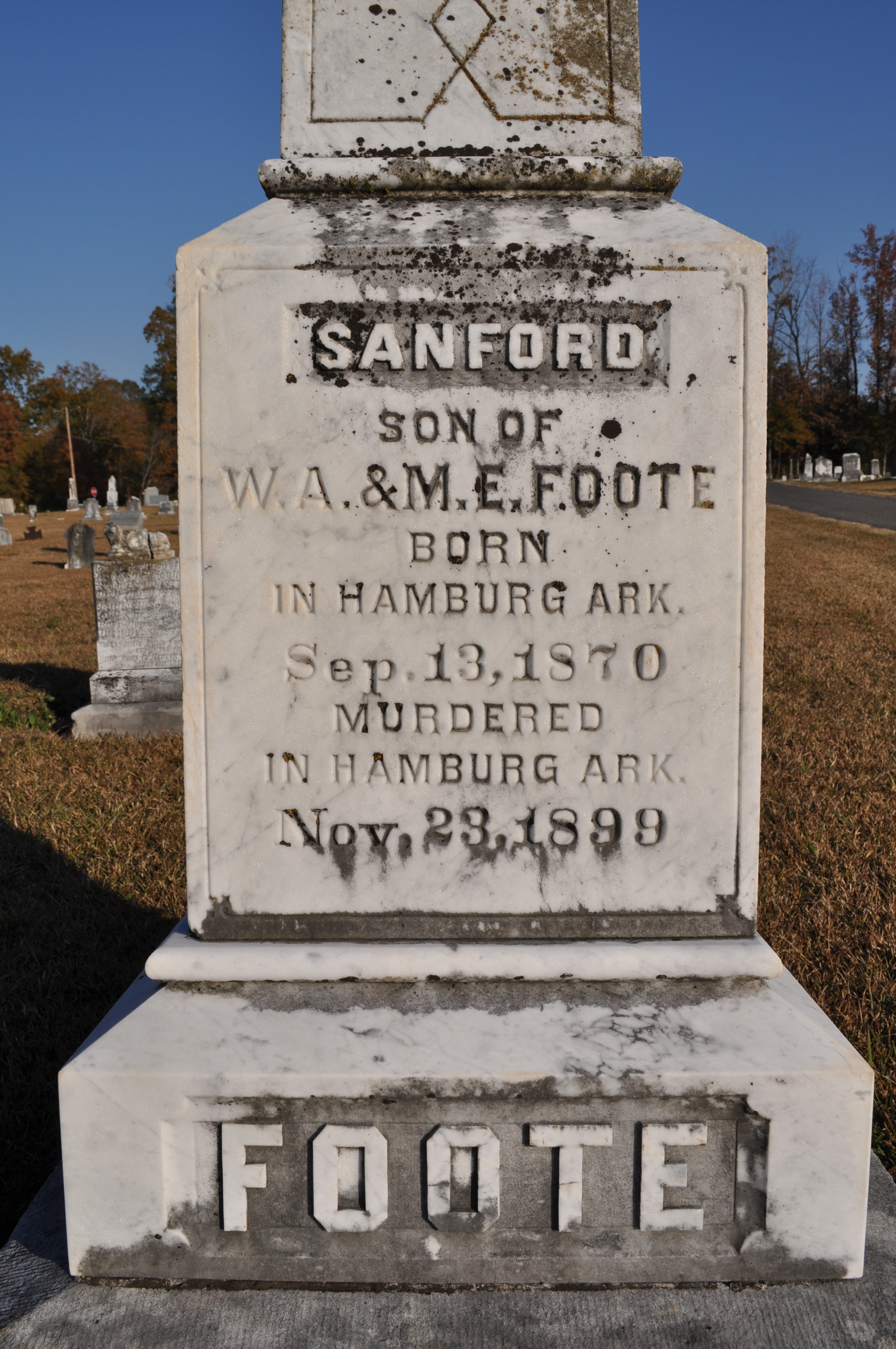

- Location within Arkansas Location within the United States
- Location: 800 East Parker Street, Hamburg, Arkansas
- Coordinates: 33°13′26″N 91°47′10″W
- Built: 1859
- NRHP reference No.: 11000684
- Added to NRHP: September 23, 2011

Hamburg Cemetery is the main cemetery of Hamburg, Ashley County, Arkansas. It is located on the east side of the city, south of Arkansas Highway 8 (East Parker Street). The cemetery was established in 1848, and the first burial was recorded in 1859. It has since become the burial site for many citizens from Hamburg, and been expanded in area.

The oldest section of the cemetery, which was used predominantly from its inception to 1950, was listed on the National Register of Historic Places (as "Hamburg Cemetery, Historic Section") in 2011.

== Notable burials ==
- Charles Portis (1933–2020), author of True Grit

== See also ==
- National Register of Historic Places listings in Ashley County, Arkansas
