= W.R. Bunckley House =

Historic house in Arkansas, United States

- W. R. Bunckley House
- U.S. National Register of Historic Places
- Location within Arkansas Location within the United States
- Location: 509 E. Parker St., Hamburg, Arkansas
- Coordinates: 33°13′23″N 91°44′12″W
- Area: less than one acre
- NRHP reference No.: 94000189
- Added to NRHP: March 17, 1994

The W.R. Bunckley House is a historic house at 509 East Parker Street in Hamburg, Arkansas. It is the earliest and best preserved example of a Folk Victorian house in the community. It was built in 1903 for W. R. Bunckley, an American Civil War veteran who had married the daughter of David Watson, a successful local businessman whose grand mansion still stands nearby. This 1 1/2-story wood-frame house is a rambling, asymmetrical vernacular expression of Queen Anne styling. The principal focus of this styling on the outside is the wraparound porch, which features detailed turned and jigsaw woodwork. Interior decorations, including turned woodwork and stained glass, are also well preserved.

The house was listed on the National Register of Historic Places in 1994.

== See also ==
- National Register of Historic Places listings in Ashley County, Arkansas
