= Arkansas Highway 209 =

Highway in Arkansas

Highway 209

Route information
- Maintained by AHTD
- Existed: 1958–present

Section 1
- Length: 1.02 mi (1.64 km)
- South end: AR 8 in Parkdale
- North end: US 165 in Parkdale

Section 2
- Length: 0.59 mi (950 m)
- South end: US 65 near Readland
- North end: AR 8 at Readland

Location
- Country: United States
- State: Arkansas
- Counties: Ashley, Chicot

Highway system
- Arkansas Highway System; Interstate; US; State; Business; Spurs; Suffixed; Scenic; Heritage
← AR 208	→ AR 210

Arkansas Highway 209 is a designation for two north–south state highways in southeast Arkansas. One segment of 1.02 miles (1.64 km) runs in Parkdale from U.S. Route 165 (US 165) northeast to Highway 8. A second segment of 0.59 miles (0.95 km) runs from US 65 west of Readland east to Highway 8 at Readland.

== Route description ==
=== Parkdale ===
Highway 209 begins at Highway 8 and runs northeast through Parkdale. The route meets US 165 and terminates on the north end of town. Highway 209 is named School Avenue in Parkdale, and passes two properties listed on the National Register of Historic Places: the Dr. Robert George Williams House and the Parkdale Baptist Church.

=== Readland ===
The route begins at US 65 west of Readland. Highway 209 runs east to Highway 8 at Readland, where it terminates near the shores of Grand Lake. The route is two-lane undivided for its entire length.

== History ==
Highway 209 began as a route along Grand Lake from Highway 8 south, first numbered on the state highway map in 1959. This route would later be shortened when Highway 8 was extended along its former length, leaving the Highway 209 designation on the connector road only. The route in Parkdale was added to the state highway system in 1975.

== Major intersections ==
County	Location	mi	km	Destinations	Notes
Ashley	Parkdale	0.00	0.00	AR 8 – Eudora, Hamburg	Southern terminus
Ashley	Parkdale	1.02	1.64	US 165 – Bastrop, LA, McGehee	Northern terminus
Gap in route
Chicot		0.00	0.00	US 65 – Tallulah, LA, Eudora, Lake Village	Southern terminus
Chicot	Readland	0.59	0.95	AR 8 (Grand Lake Loop)	Northern terminus
1.000 mi = 1.609 km; 1.000 km = 0.621 mi

== See also ==
- List of state highways in Arkansas
