= Crossroads Fire Tower =

- U.S. National Register of Historic Places
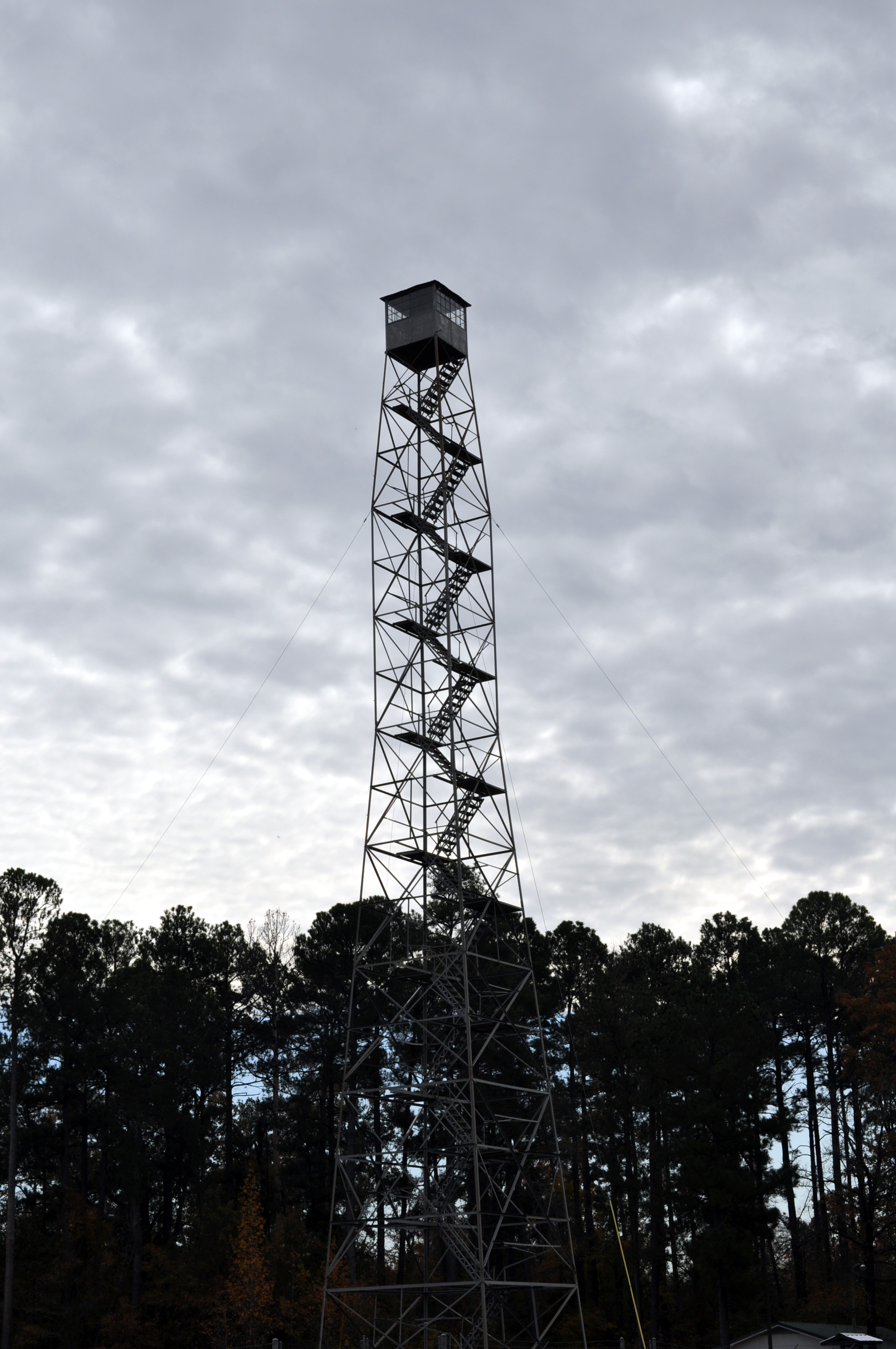

- Location within Arkansas Location within the United States
- Location: 2262 AR 133 N, Hamburg, Arkansas
- Coordinates: 33°13′58″N 91°55′28″W
- Area: less than one acre
- Built: 1936
- Built by: Civilian Conservation Corps
- Architectural style: Fire tower
- MPS: Facilities Constructed by the CCC in Arkansas MPS
- NRHP reference No.: 06000078
- Added to NRHP: March 2, 2006

The Crossroads Fire Tower is a fire lookout tower at 2262 Arkansas Highway 133 North in Ashley County, Arkansas. The tallest tower of its type in Arkansas, it is located north of Crossett and west of Hamburg, which is just north of the junction of Highway 133 and Ashley County Highway 12.

== Background ==
It was built by the Aermotor Company and installed by a Civilian Conservation Corps crew in 1935. When built it was 100 feet (30 m) tall, but an additional 20 feet (6.1 m) was added sometime between 1936 and 1943. The Aermotor tower is of galvanized steel construction, although the staircase landings and treads are wooden. The tower has a viewing cabin at the top with adjustable glass panes.

The tower was listed on the National Register of Historic Places in 2006.

== See also ==
- National Register of Historic Places listings in Ashley County, Arkansas
