= Bethel Cemetery (Ashley County, Arkansas) =

Historic cemetery in Arkansas, United States

- U.S. National Register of Historic Places
- Location within Arkansas Location within the United States
- Location: At the end of Bethel Rd., 3.5 miles (5.6 km) N. of the jct. of AR 52 & AR 53, near Crossett, Arkansas
- Coordinates: 33°12′56″N 91°55′21″W
- Area: 1.5 acres (0.61 ha)
- NRHP reference No.: 100001003
- Added to NRHP: June 5, 2017

Bethel Cemetery is a historic cemetery at the end of Bethel Road in rural eastern Ashley County, Arkansas. It is about 1.5 acres (0.61 ha) in size, with about 170 marked burial sites, and an unknown number of unmarked sites. The oldest marked burial is dated 1855, and it continues to receive new burials. It contains funerary markers carved by makers from an unusually wide geographic area, extending from New Orleans to St. Louis.

The cemetery was listed on the National Register of Historic Places in 2017.

== See also ==
- National Register of Historic Places listings in Ashley County, Arkansas
