= Dr. Robert George Williams House =

Historic house in Arkansas, United States

- U.S. National Register of Historic Places
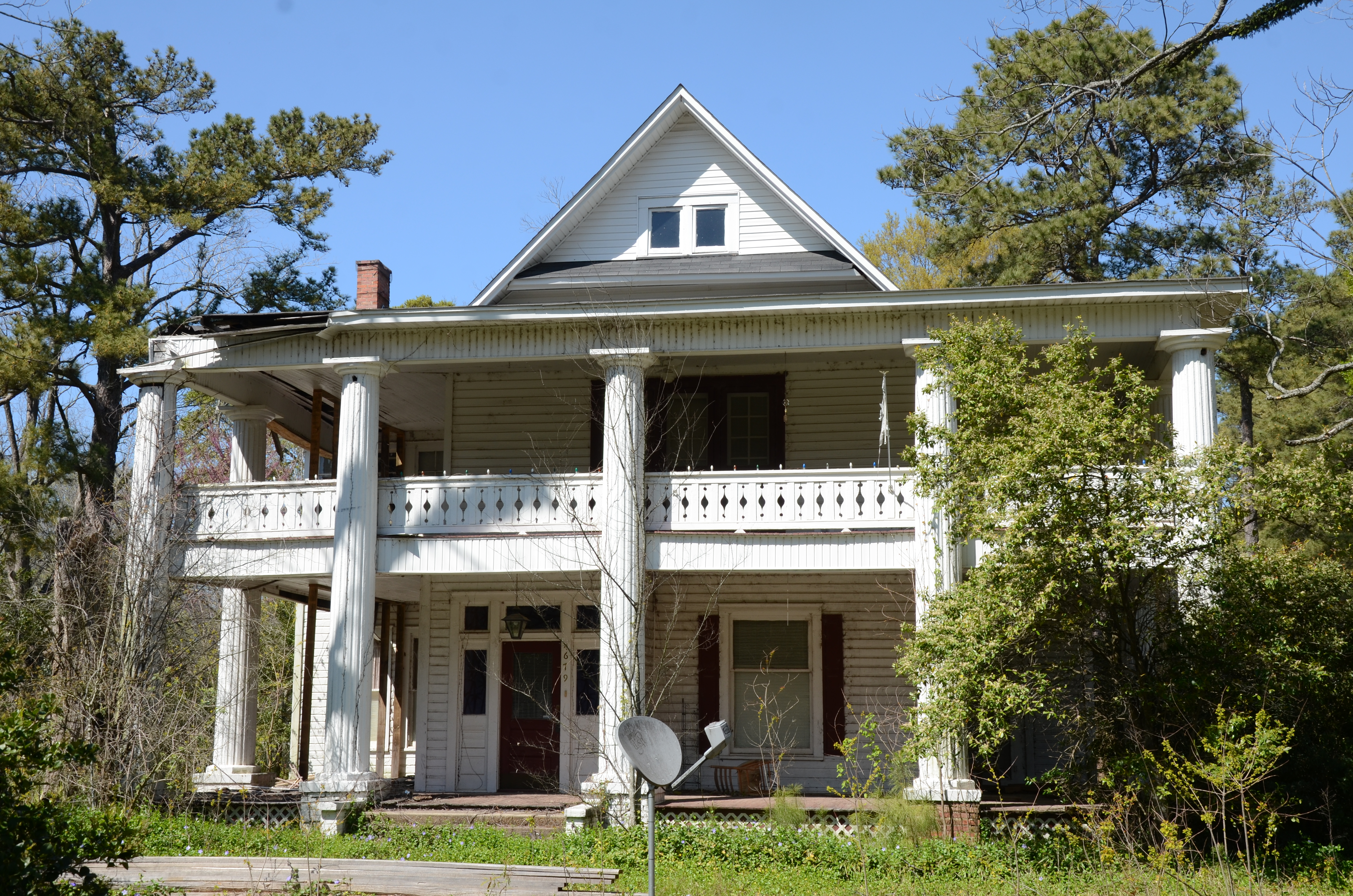

- Location within Arkansas Location within the United States
- Location: AR 8 and 209, Parkdale, Arkansas
- Coordinates: 33°7′17″N 91°32′56″W
- Area: less than one acre
- Built: 1903
- Architectural style: Colonial Revival
- NRHP reference No.: 84000002
- Added to NRHP: October 4, 1984

The Dr. Robert George Williams House is a historic house at the junction of Arkansas Highway 8 and Arkansas Highway 209 in Parkdale, Arkansas. It was built in 1903 for Dr. Robert George Williams, a prominent medical doctor and businessman in Ashley County, and is one of the most elaborately decorated houses in Parkdale. The house when built was a simple wood frame gable end house with a porch across the front. It was extensively altered in 1917, giving it the Colonial Revival flair it has today, adding gabled dormers on three sides and a two-story portico supported by fluted columns to the front facade.

The house was listed on the National Register of Historic Places in 1984.
