= Sumner-White Dipping Vat =

- Sumner–White Dipping Vat
- U.S. National Register of Historic Places
- Location within Arkansas Location within the United States
- Nearest city: Hamburg, Arkansas
- Coordinates: 33°21′5″N 91°39′14″W
- Area: less than one acre
- Built: 1915
- MPS: Dip That Tick:Texas Tick Fever Eradication in Arkansas MPS
- NRHP reference No.: 06000087
- Added to NRHP: March 2, 2006

The Sumner–White Dipping Vat is a historic concrete cattle dipping vat in Ashley County, Arkansas. It is located about four miles northeast of the intersection of U.S. Highway 82 and County Road 69, half a mile in the woods northeast of the Sumner-White Hunt Club. The vat is a concrete structure about 27 feet (8.2 m) long, 4 feet (1.2 m) wide, and 7 feet (2.1 m) deep. A U-shaped concrete structure, built about the same time, stands about 2 feet (0.61 m) from the vat, near where cattle would have exited the vat. It was probably built c. 1915, when a statewide program was initiated for the eradication of Texas tick fever. The facilities were likely used until the program came to an end in 1943.

The vat and associated U-shaped structure were listed on the National Register of Historic Places in 2006.

== See also ==
- National Register of Historic Places listings in Ashley County, Arkansas
