= Louisiana Highway 142 =

State highway in Louisiana, United States

Louisiana Highway 142
- Crossett Road
- Route of LA 142 highlighted in red

Route information
- Maintained by Louisiana DOTD
- Length: 8.747 mi (14.077 km)
- Existed: 1955 renumbering–present

Major junctions
- South end: US 425 north of Bastrop
- North end: AR 133 at Arkansas state line northwest of Beekman

Location
- Country: United States
- State: Louisiana
- Parishes: Morehouse

Highway system
- Louisiana State Highway System; Interstate; US; State; Scenic
← LA 141	→ LA 143
← SR C-1489	C-1490	→ SR C-1491

Louisiana Highway 142 (LA 142) is a state highway located in Morehouse Parish, Louisiana. It runs 8.75 miles (14.08 km) in a north–south direction from U.S. Highway 425 (US 425) north of Bastrop through Beekman to the Arkansas state line.

LA 142 traverses a rural and thickly wooded area in the northeastern portion of the state. The route connects Bastrop, the parish seat and largest city in Morehouse Parish, with Crossett, a city in Ashley County, Arkansas. While LA 142 heads northwest toward Crossett, US 425 travels in a slightly northeastern trajectory to the smaller city of Hamburg. Though the route performs a north–south function, signage for LA 142 does not carry directional banners. LA 142 is known locally as Crossett Road.

== Route description ==
From the south, LA 142 begins at an intersection with US 425 near Chemin-A-Haut State Park north of Bastrop. It proceeds northwest for just under 2.0 miles (3.2 km) before curving slightly to the west and passing through a sparsely populated area along the Arkansas, Louisiana and Mississippi Railroad known as Beekman. LA 142 crosses the AL&M line at grade then resumes a northwestern course. 3.8 miles (6.1 km) later, LA 142 intersects LA 543, which heads southwest through a point known as Vaughn. Shortly afterward, the highway curves more to the north and continues for 2.4 miles (3.9 km) before reaching the Arkansas state line. The route proceeds northward into Ashley County as Arkansas Highway 133 (AR 133) toward the city of Crossett.

The route is classified as a rural minor arterial by the Louisiana Department of Transportation and Development (La DOTD) with an average daily traffic volume in 2013 of 3,400 vehicles. LA 142 is an undivided, two-lane highway for its entire length with a posted speed limit of 55 mph (90 km/h).

== History ==
=== Pre-1955 route numbering ===
State Route C-1490
- Location: Morehouse Parish
- Length: 8.9 mi (14.3 km)
- Existed: 1930s–1955

In the original Louisiana Highway system in use between 1921 and 1955, the modern LA 142 was designated as State Route C-1490. Like all state highways created after 1930, Route C-1490 was numbered by the state highway department rather than by an act of the state legislature and carried a "C-" prefix. The southern terminus was at that time a junction with State Route 204, which followed the modern route of US 425 between Bastrop and the Arkansas state line. Apart from the straightening of some curves in the vicinity of Beekman, Route C-1490 remained relatively unchanged until the 1955 Louisiana Highway renumbering.

=== Post-1955 route history ===
LA 142 was created in 1955 as a direct renumbering of State Route C-1490.

LA 142—From the Arkansas state line south of Crossett[,] Arkansas through or near Beekman to a junction with LA 139 at or near Chemin A Haut.

— 1955 legislative route description

The southern terminus of the route was now a junction with LA 139. In 1989, US 425 was created and replaced the LA 139 designation north of Bastrop.

The route of LA 142 has seen only minor improvements since the 1955 renumbering. Most recently, LA 142 was slightly realigned at its southern terminus to intersect US 425 at a right angle. This was done in conjunction with a project completed in April 2012 that widened US 425 to four lanes between Bastrop and the Arkansas state line.

== Major intersections ==
The entire route is in Morehouse Parish.

mi	km	Destinations	Notes
0.000– 0.017	0.000– 0.027	US 425 (Crossett Road, Hamburg Road) – Bastrop, Hamburg	Southern terminus
6.121	9.851	LA 543 (Vaughn Road)	Eastern terminus of LA 543
8.747	14.077	AR 133 north – Crossett	Northern terminus; continuation in Arkansas
1.000 mi = 1.609 km; 1.000 km = 0.621 mi
