= Watson-Sawyer House =

Historic house in Arkansas, United States

- U.S. National Register of Historic Places
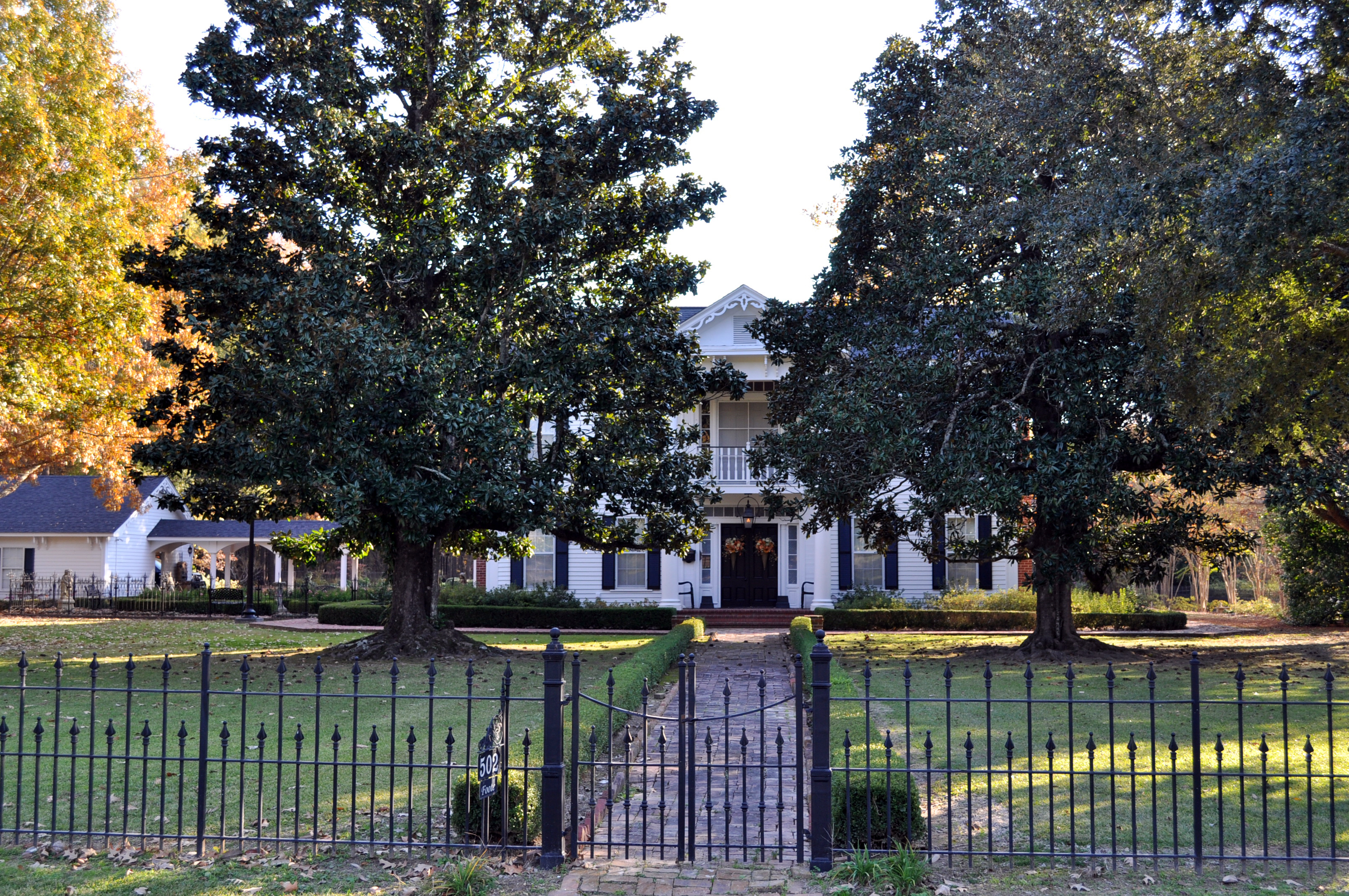

- Location within Arkansas Location within the United States
- Location: 502 E. Parker St., Hamburg, Arkansas
- Coordinates: 33°13′25″N 91°47′36″W
- Area: less than one acre
- Built: 1870
- Built by: E.D. Watson
- Architectural style: Eclectic Provincial
- NRHP reference No.: 75000373
- Added to NRHP: December 6, 1975

The Watson-Sawyer House is a historic house at 502 E. Parker St. in Hamburg, Arkansas. It was built in 1870 by E.D. Watson, an early settler of Ashley County, and is one of the finest houses in the county. The two-story house was built entirely out of oak, and features a two-story pedimented front portico supported by fluted Doric columns. The pediment is decorated with ribbon-like woodwork, which is repeated on the gable ends of main roof. Each floor on the front facade has a centrally located door with sidelights, flanked by pairs of windows.

The house was listed on the National Register of Historic Places in 1975. It continues to be held by Watson's descendants.

== See also ==
- National Register of Historic Places listings in Ashley County, Arkansas
