= First United Methodist Church (Hamburg, Arkansas) =

Historic church in Arkansas, United States

- U.S. National Register of Historic Places
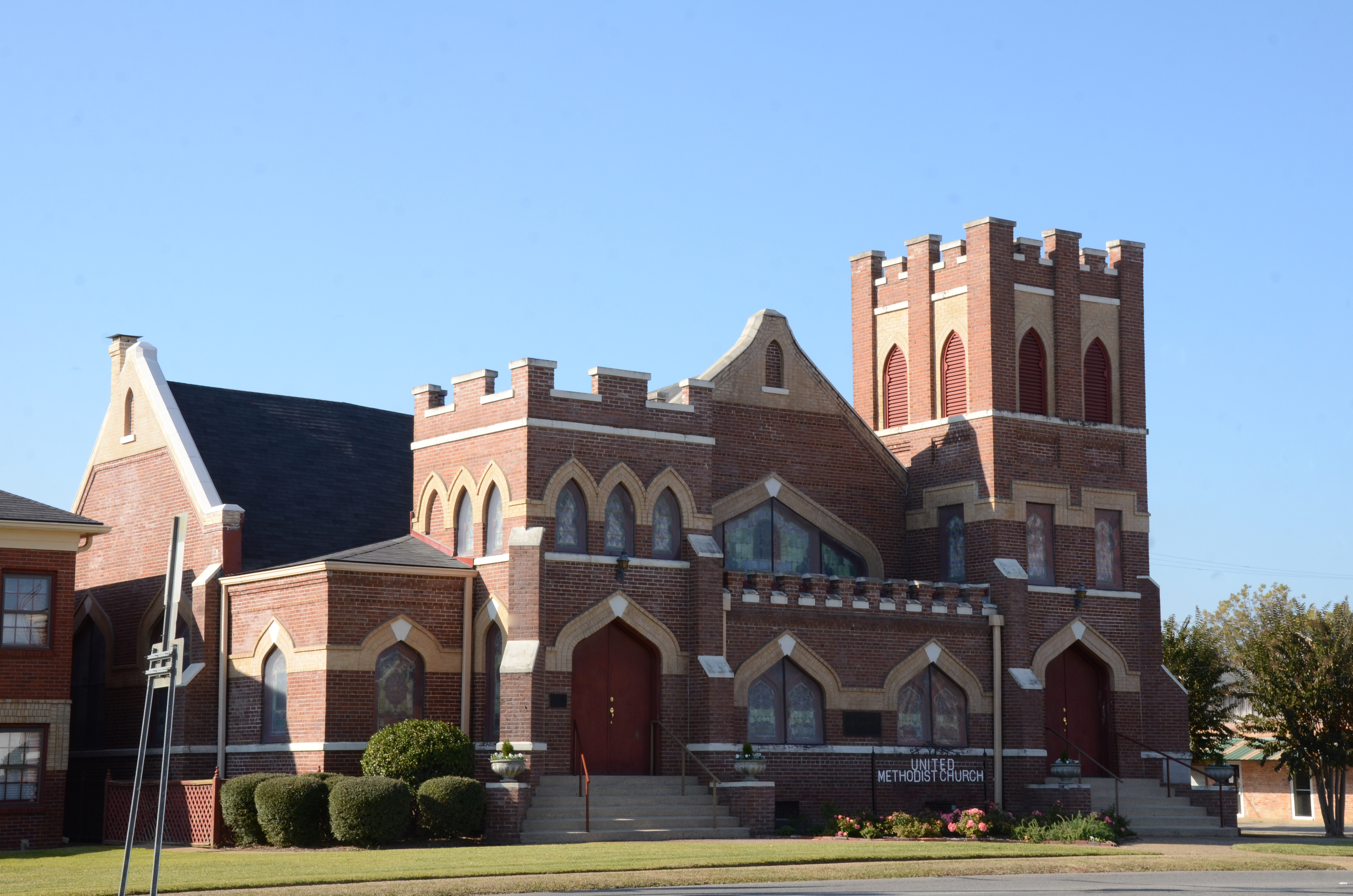

- Location within Arkansas Location within the United States
- Location: 204 S. Main, Hamburg, Arkansas
- Coordinates: 33°13′29″N 91°47′52″W
- Area: less than one acre
- Built: 1910
- Architect: Nolley, J.A.; Nolley, Sebe
- Architectural style: Gothic
- NRHP reference No.: 92000388
- Added to NRHP: April 27, 1992

The First United Methodist Church is a historic church building at 204 S. Main in Hamburg, Arkansas. The brick Gothic Revival building was built in 1910 for Hamburg's first organized congregation, founded in 1850, which had previously met in a wood-frame building on the same site. It was designed by the Nolley Brothers, who owned a local brickyard, and was based on Gothic Revival designs that one of them had observed at the St. Louis World's Fair.

The original building's main facade consisted of two towers, one higher than the other, flanking a single-story sanctuary section. Although the main roof spine runs between the towers, there is a large gable between the towers perpendicular to that line facing the front of the building. This gable end is decorated by a stained glass window designed for the church by the Jacoby Art Glass Company of St. Louis.

The building was listed on the National Register of Historic Places in 1992.

== See also ==
- National Register of Historic Places listings in Ashley County, Arkansas
