= Hamburg Presbyterian Church =

Historic church in Arkansas, United States

- U.S. National Register of Historic Places
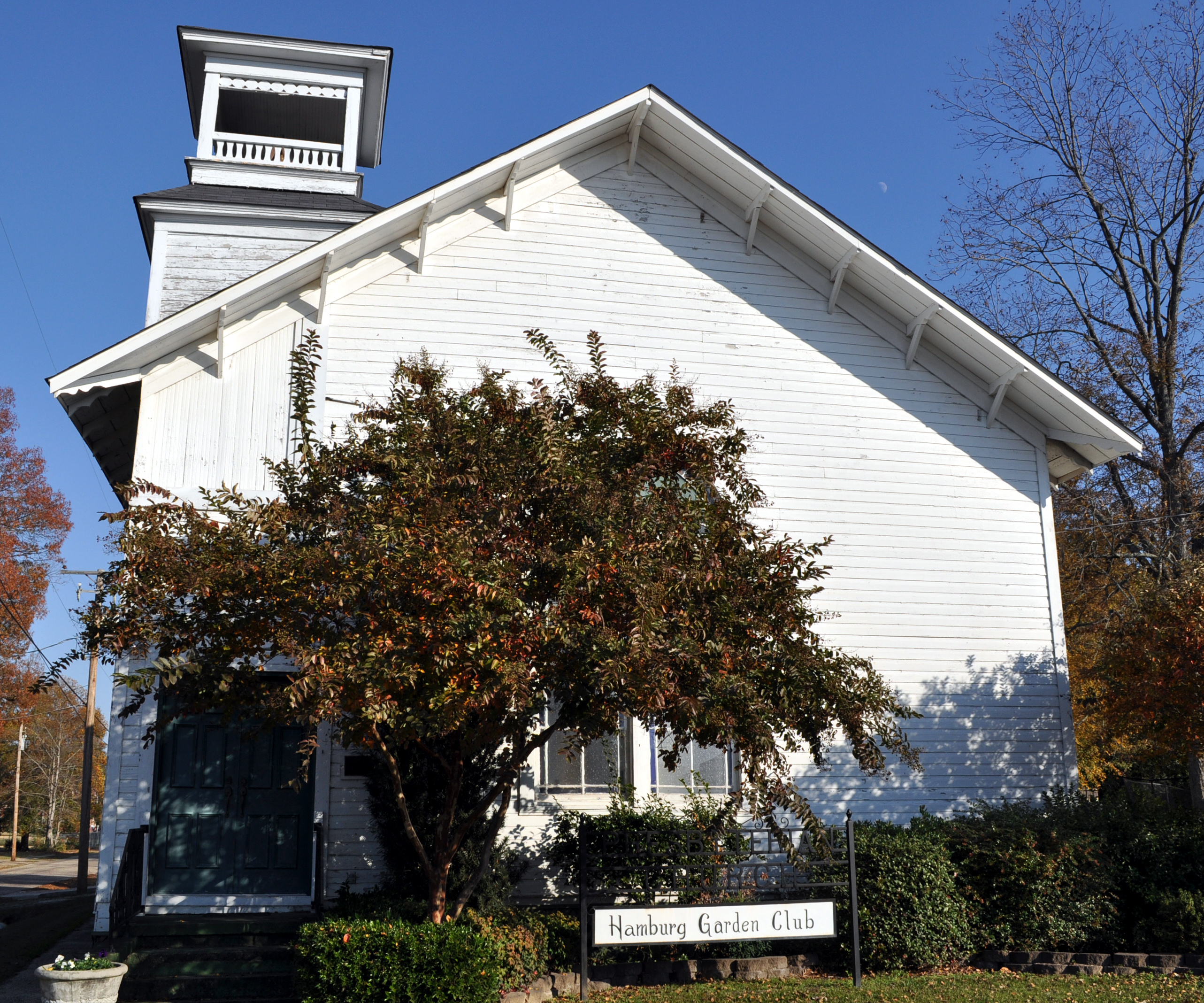

- Location within Arkansas Location within the United States
- Location: Jct. of Cherry and Lincoln Sts., Hamburg, Arkansas
- Coordinates: 33°13′32″N 91°47′40″W
- Area: less than one acre
- Built: 1920
- Architectural style: Bungalow/craftsman
- NRHP reference No.: 91000589
- Added to NRHP: May 14, 1991

The Hamburg Presbyterian Church is a historic church at the junction of Cherry and Lincoln Streets in Hamburg, Arkansas. The building, a single story wood-frame structure, has an unusual construction history. It was built in 1871, and was apparently stylistically decorated in Stick Style, although no historic photos of the building have been found. In c. 1920 the building underwent a series of alterations, including relocation or reconstruction of its tower to its present location, when it had originally been at the entrance. It is at this time that the cornice bracketing and half-timbering was added, giving the building a Craftsman style appearance.

The building was listed on the National Register of Historic Places in 1991. It was sold to the Hamburg Garden Club in the 1980s, which maintained its c. 1920 appearance.

== See also ==
- National Register of Historic Places listings in Ashley County, Arkansas
