= Arkansas Highway 52 =

State highway in Arkansas, United States

Highway 52

Route information
- Maintained by ArDOT
- Existed: April 1, 1926–present

Section 1
- Length: 7.466 mi (12.015 km)
- West end: AR 133 at North Crossett
- East end: US 82 / US 425

Section 2
- Length: 1.842 mi (2.964 km)
- West end: US 82 / US 425
- East end: CR 25 / CR 26

Section 3
- Length: 16.605 mi (26.723 km)
- West end: US 165 in Wilmot
- East end: AR 159 at Indian

Location
- Country: United States
- State: Arkansas
- Counties: Ashley, Chicot

Highway system
- Arkansas Highway System; Interstate; US; State; Business; Spurs; Suffixed; Scenic; Heritage
← AR 51	→ AR 53

Highway 52 (AR 52, Ark. 52, and Hwy. 52) is a designation for three state highways in Southeast Arkansas. All segments are low volume, two-lane roadways in rural areas. The segment between Wilmot and Indian has been designated since the original 1926 Arkansas state highway numbering, with new designations created in 1966 and 1985. All segments are maintained by the Arkansas Department of Transportation (ArDOT).

== Route description ==
ArDOT maintains all three segments of AR 52 as part of the state highway system. ArDOT estimates the traffic level for a segment of roadway was highest on the western end of AR 52 near Crossett, estimated at 3,200 vehicles per day in 2019, on average. Near the eastern terminus, the highway saw 1,500 VPD in 2019, with counts on the other segments taken near Wilmot (240 VPD) and east of US 82 (190 VPD). For reference, roads under 400 VPD are classified as "very low volume local road" by the American Association of State Highway and Transportation Officials (AASHTO).

No segment of AR 52 is part of the National Highway System (NHS), a network of roads important to the nation's economy, defense, and mobility.

=== North Crossett to US 82/US 425 ===
AR 52 begins in South Arkansas at an intersection with Highway 133 in the unincorporated community of North Crossett. It runs east past the University of Arkansas at Monticello College of Technology—Crossett and Z. M. Jack Stell Field before becoming a rural route serving minor county roads. The highway terminates at US 82/US 425 south of Hamburg.

=== US 82/US 425 to Berlin Road ===
The middle segment of Highway 52 begins at a junction with US 82/US 425 2.6 miles (4.2 km) south of the eastern terminus of the previously mentioned segment. This junction is also the southern terminus of an overlap between US 82/US 425 that runs north to Hamburg. The route runs east through forested land to a paved road called Berlin Road, designated as Ashley County Road 26 (CR 26) north of this junction and CR 25 south toward Berlin.

=== Wilmot to Indian ===
The third segment of Highway 52 begins at US 165 (Main Street) in Wilmot, a small town in eastern Ashley County. The highway runs east into Chicot County, where it becomes a section line road. Continuing east, Highway 52 passes swampland and fish hatcheries before it bridges the Boeuf River. The route terminates at a junction with AR 159 at the unincorporated community of Indian approximately three miles (4.8 km) north of Louisiana.

== History ==
State Road 52 was created during the 1926 Arkansas state highway numbering between State Road 13 (now US 425) and State Road 8 at Empire, labeled as an "unimproved road" except a short segment east of Wilmot. The following year, the eastern terminus was moved along State Road 8 into Ashley County. By September 1929, the highway was truncated to US 165 at Wilmot. By the 1945 map, AR 52 had been extended east from Wilmot to the Chicot county line, and extended to AR 159 at Indian in 1963.

On January 12, 1966, the Arkansas State Highway Commission created a second segment of AR 52 between US 82 in Crossett and AR 81 (now US 425). In 1973, the parallel AR 52 and US 82 designations were switched between Crossett and Hamburg to align US 82 to the "safer, more convenient and a higher type facility".

On July 18, 1985, the Highway Commission ordered a change to the state highway system requested by the Ashley County Judge: the creation of a third segment of AR 52 from the US 82/AR 81 junction east through the Overflow National Wildlife Refuge to AR 8 in exchange for deleting most of AR 52 between AR 81 and US 165. The remaining short segment providing access to Overflow NWR was re-designated as AR 173. In 2001, AR 52 between CR 26 and AR 8 was removed from the state highway system at the request of the Ashley County Judge in exchange for addition of two county roads as state highways (new segments of AR 160 and AR 189).

== Major intersections ==
County	Location	mi	km	Destinations	Notes
Ashley	North Crossett	0.000	0.000	AR 133 – Crossett, Fountain Hill	Western terminus
Ashley		7.466	12.015	US 82 / US 425 – Hamburg, Lake Village, Bastrop, LA	Eastern terminus
Ashley	Gap in route				
Ashley		0.000	0.000	US 82 / US 425 – Crossett, Hamburg	Western terminus
Ashley		1.842	2.964	CR 25 south / CR 26 north (Berlin Road)	Eastern terminus, to LA 591
Ashley	Gap in route				
Ashley	Wilmot	0.00	0.00	US 165 (Main Street) – Bastrop, LA, Parkdale	Western terminus
Chicot		10.98	17.67	Bridge over the Boeuf River	
Chicot	Indian	16.605	26.723	AR 159	Eastern terminus
1.000 mi = 1.609 km; 1.000 km = 0.621 mi
