= Parkdale Methodist Church =

Historic church in Arkansas, United States

- U.S. National Register of Historic Places
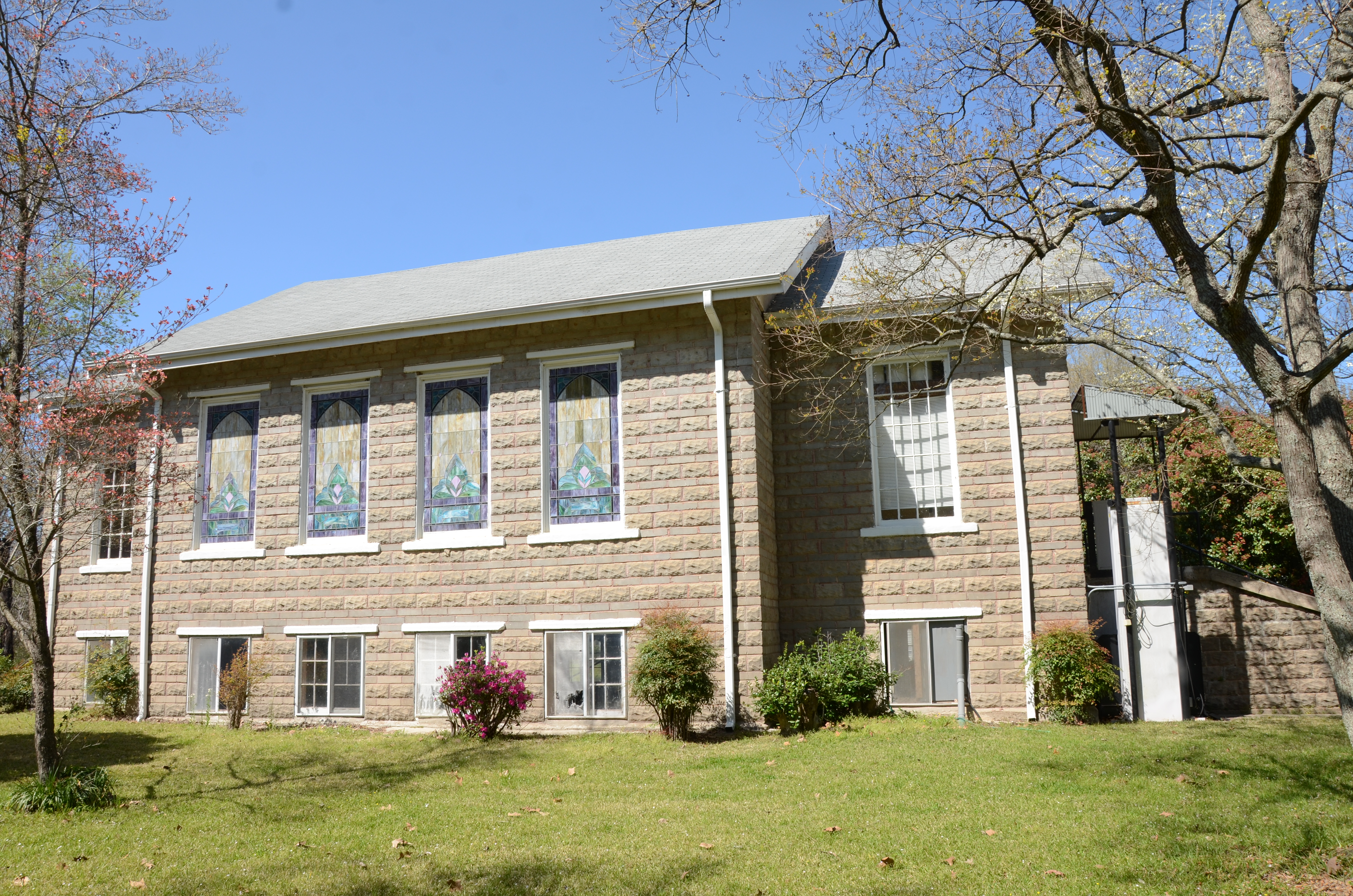

- Location within Arkansas Location within the United States
- Location: S. Church St., Parkdale, Arkansas
- Coordinates: 33°7′12″N 91°32′58″W
- Area: less than one acre
- Built: 1926
- Architectural style: Classical Revival, Other, Vernacular
- NRHP reference No.: 07000505
- Added to NRHP: June 5, 2007

The Parkdale Methodist Church is a historic church building on S. Church Street in Parkdale, Arkansas. Built out of rubble-faced and smooth concrete blocks that were shaped on site in 1926, it is an architecturally distinctive Plain-Traditional building with Classical Revival elements. The walls are lined with stained glass windows, and the entry is made through a recessed porch supported by Tuscan columns.

The church was listed on the National Register of Historic Places in 2007. The congregation was closed by the Arkansas Annual Conference of the United Methodist Church in August 2023 and the building sold, along with its parsonage, for $40,000.

== See also ==
- National Register of Historic Places listings in Ashley County, Arkansas
