= Watson House (Hamburg, Arkansas) =

Historic house in Arkansas, United States

- U.S. National Register of Historic Places
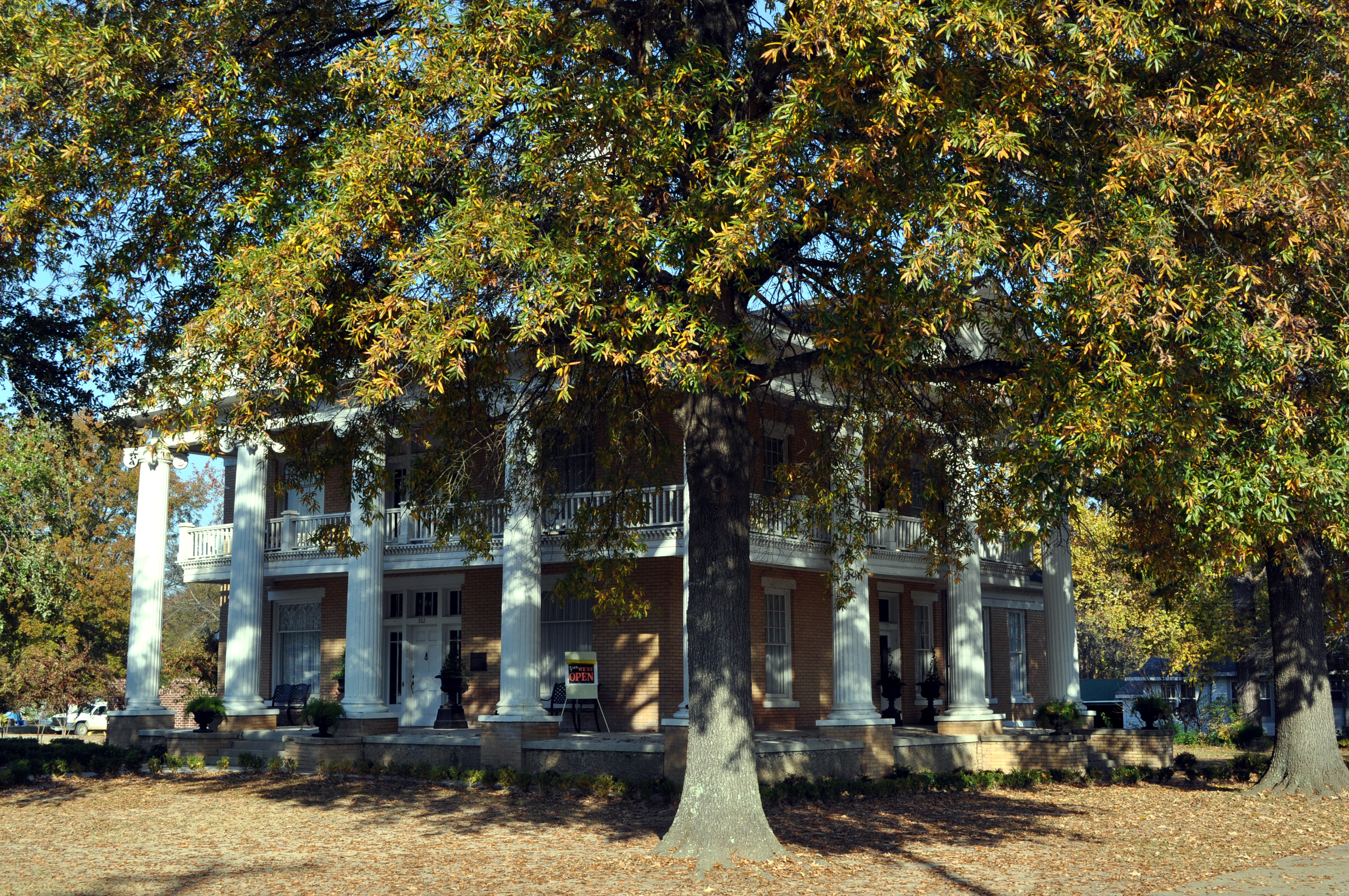

- Location within Arkansas Location within the United States
- Location: 300 N. Cherry, Hamburg, Arkansas
- Coordinates: 33°13′37″N 91°47′40″W
- Area: less than one acre
- Built: 1918
- Architect: W.C. Bunn
- Architectural style: Classical Revival
- NRHP reference No.: 77000242
- Added to NRHP: December 28, 1977

The Watson House is a historic house at 300 N. Cherry Street in Hamburg, Arkansas. The two story Colonial Revival brick house was built in 1918, and features verandas on its street-facing elevations. The verandas are supported by large Ionic columns that rise two full stories to support the roof, with the second floor veranda supported by cables suspended from above. The large-proportioned house is one of the most prominent buildings in Hamburg. It was designed and built by W. C. Bunn for David Watson, owner of a successful local hardware store.

The house was listed on the National Register of Historic Places in 1977. It now houses the Ashley County Museum.

== See also ==
- National Register of Historic Places listings in Ashley County, Arkansas
