= Parkdale Baptist Church =

Historic church in Arkansas, United States

- Parkdale Baptist Church-AS0051
- U.S. National Register of Historic Places
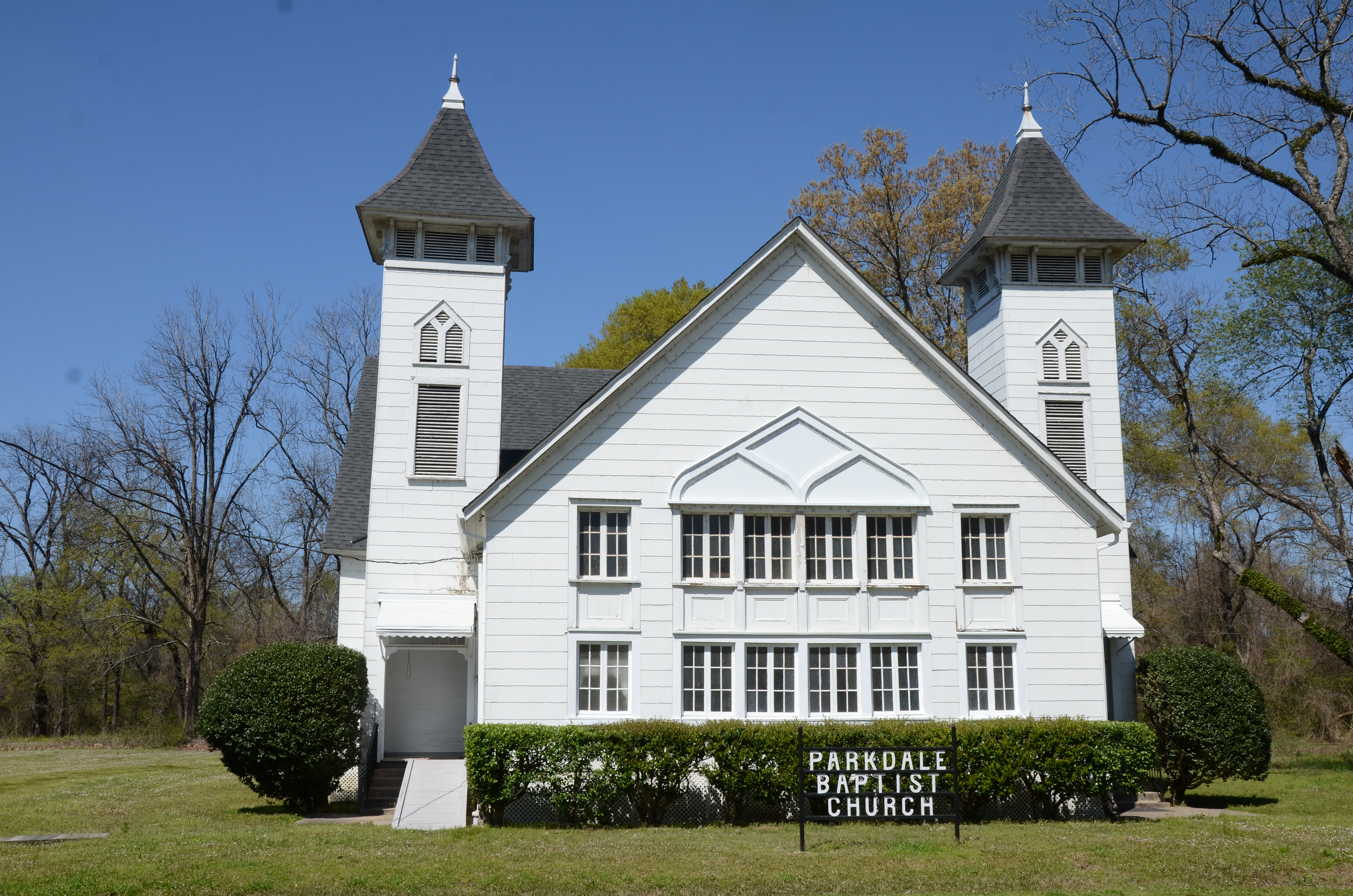

- Location within Arkansas Location within the United States
- Location: 127 Bride St., Parkdale, Arkansas
- Coordinates: 33°7′22″N 91°32′57″W
- Area: 1 acre (0.40 ha)
- Built: 1910
- Architectural style: Late Gothic Revival
- NRHP reference No.: 06001285
- Added to NRHP: January 24, 2007

The Parkdale Baptist Church (also known as First Baptist Missionary Church of Parkdale) is a historic Baptist church building at 137 Bride Street in Parkdale, Arkansas. The Late Gothic Revival style building was constructed in 1910, and is one of comparatively few buildings in southeastern Arkansas in that style. The building follows a modified cruciform plan. Its main Gothic Revival features include the pointed arch windows that predominate, twin towers, and gable ends with patterned-glass windows.

The church was listed on the National Register of Historic Places (as "Parkdale Baptist Church-AS0051") in 2007.

== See also ==
- National Register of Historic Places listings in Ashley County, Arkansas
