= Lynching of Earnest Williams =

1908 lynching of a Black man in Arkansas

Coordinates: 33°7′18″N 91°32′51″W

Earnest Williams was an African-American man who was lynched by a mob in Parkdale, Ashley County, Arkansas, in 1908. John R. Steelman, who wrote his PhD dissertation on "mob action in the South", listed Williams as one of the cases, and said "Earnest Williams was thrust into eternity by a band of men who were 'outraged' at him for 'using offensive language'."
