= Naff House =

Historic house in Arkansas, United States

- U.S. National Register of Historic Places
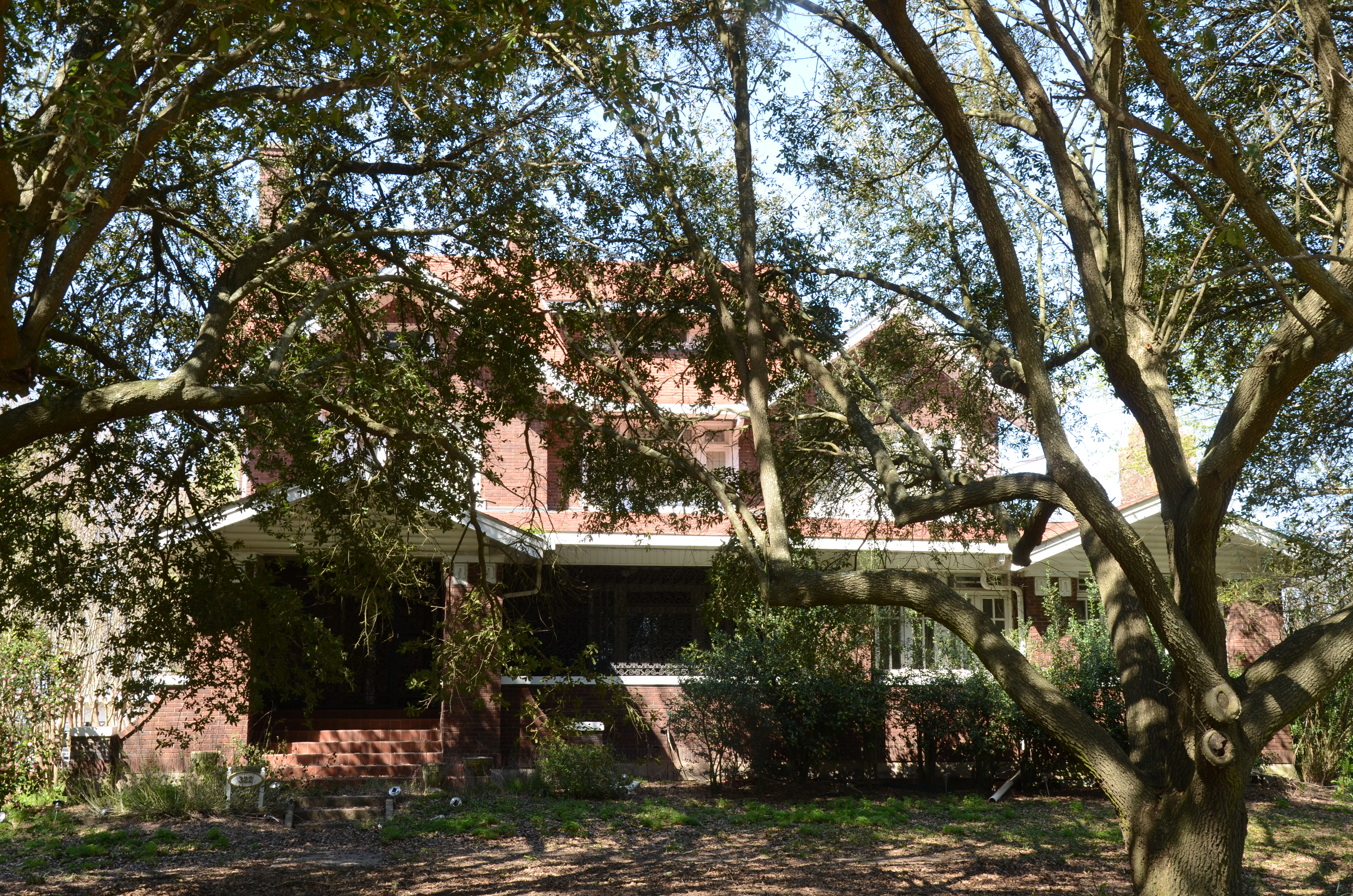

- Location within Arkansas Location within the United States
- Location: Jct. of 3rd Ave. and Fir St., NW corner, Portland, Arkansas
- Coordinates: 33°14′18″N 91°30′10″W
- Area: 1 acre (0.40 ha)
- Built: 1919
- Architect: Russell Gard, W.H. Gard
- Architectural style: Prairie School
- NRHP reference No.: 92000957
- Added to NRHP: July 24, 1992

The Naff House is a historic house at the northwest corner of 3rd Avenue and Fir Street in Portland, Arkansas. The Prairie Style brick house was built c. 1919, and is one of the few such houses in Ashley County. It was designed and built by Russell and W.H. Gard, two brothers who built a number of other residences in Portland (although none were Prairie Style, and few survive).

The house was listed on the National Register of Historic Places in 1992.

== See also ==
- National Register of Historic Places listings in Ashley County, Arkansas
