= Crossett Post Office =

- U.S. National Register of Historic Places
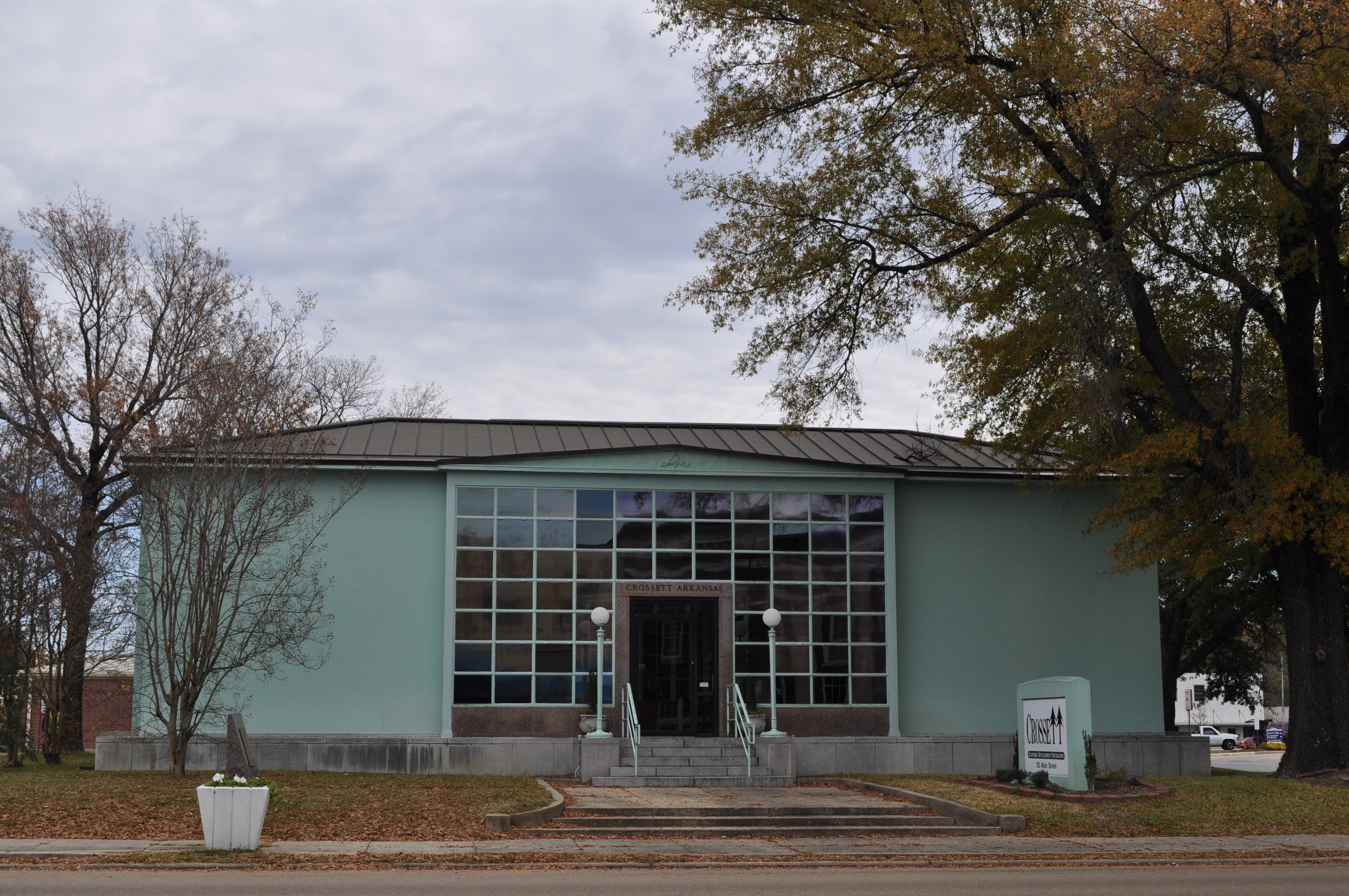

- Location within Arkansas Location within the United States
- Location: 125 Main St., Crossett, Arkansas
- Coordinates: 33°8′2″N 91°57′39″W
- Area: less than one acre
- Built: 1939
- Architect: Federal Works Agency; Boyd, J.O. Construction Co.
- Architectural style: International Style
- NRHP reference No.: 02001673
- Added to NRHP: January 8, 2003

The Crossett Post Office is a historic former post office and library building at 125 Main Street in Crossett, Arkansas. The single story Art Deco building was built in 1940 as a Works Progress Administration project, and served as the town's post office until 1968. In that year the federal government sold the building to the town for $1, and it was converted for use as a public library. It served in that role until 2002, when the library relocated to new quarters.

The building was listed on the National Register of Historic Places in 2003.

== See also ==
- National Register of Historic Places listings in Ashley County, Arkansas
- List of United States post offices
