= Crossett Municipal Auditorium =

- U.S. National Register of Historic Places
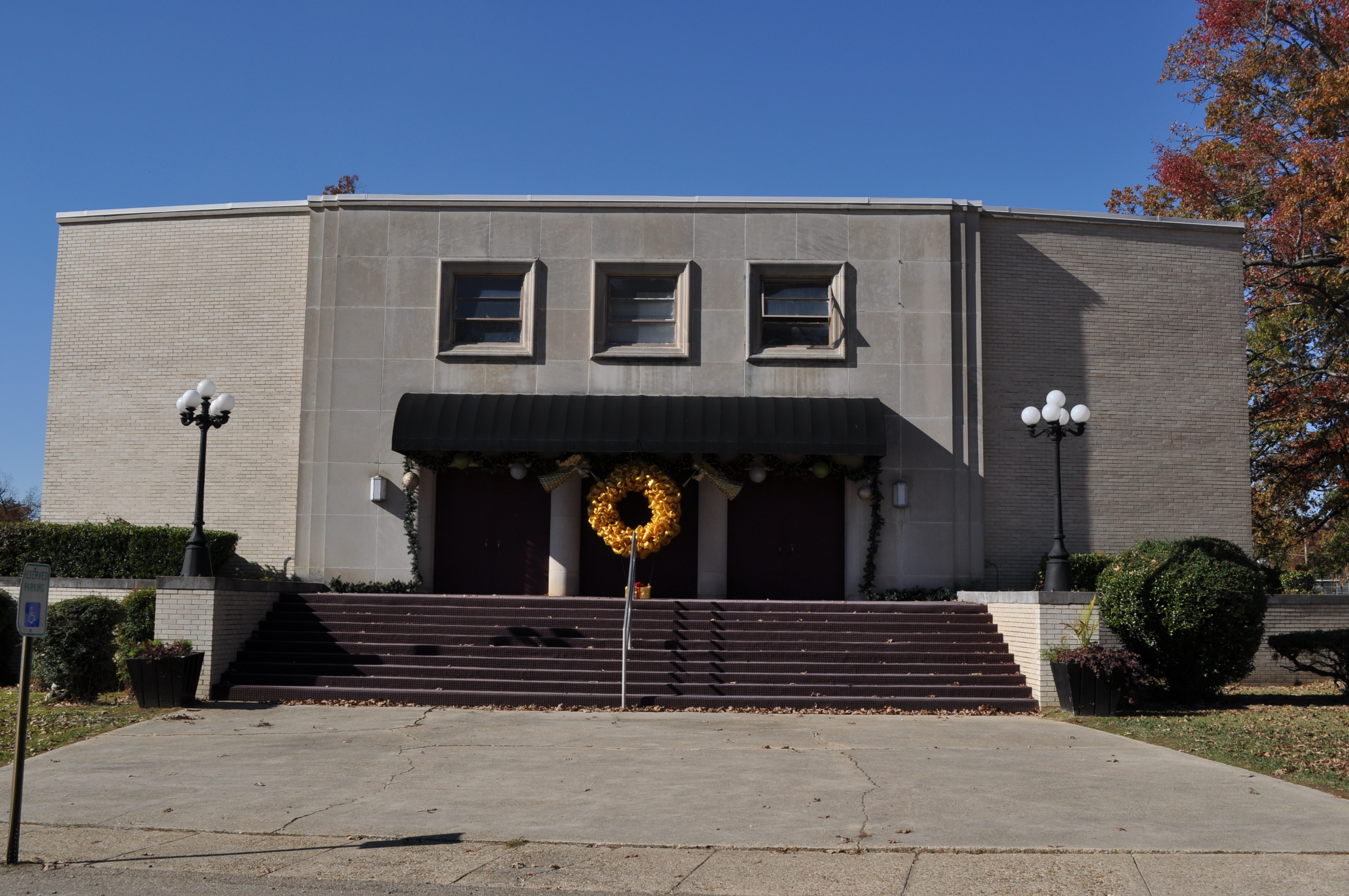

- Location within Arkansas Location within the United States
- Location: 1100 Main St., Crossett, AR
- Coordinates: 33°8′49″N 91°57′41″W
- NRHP reference No.: 07000965
- Added to NRHP: September 20, 2007

Crossett Municipal Auditorium is a historic auditorium building at 1100 Main Street in Crossett, Arkansas. Built in 1954, the building was listed in the National Register of Historic Places on September 20, 2007.

Crossett Municipal Auditorium was the site of practices and the final competition (modelling, speech, and impromptu questions) in the Miss Rodeo Arkansas pageant of 2007. Miss Brittany Sing was declared Miss Rodeo Arkansas on August 4, 2007. Preceding that announcement, Abby McCallie was declared Miss Rodeo Arkansas Princess and Miss Kirbi Allen was declared Teen Miss Rodeo Arkansas.

== See also ==
- National Register of Historic Places listings in Ashley County, Arkansas
