= Pinebergen, Arkansas =

Pinebergen is a neighborhood in southern Pine Bluff, Jefferson County, Arkansas, United States. It lies at an elevation of 236 feet (72 m).
