= Crossett Municipal Building =

- U.S. National Register of Historic Places
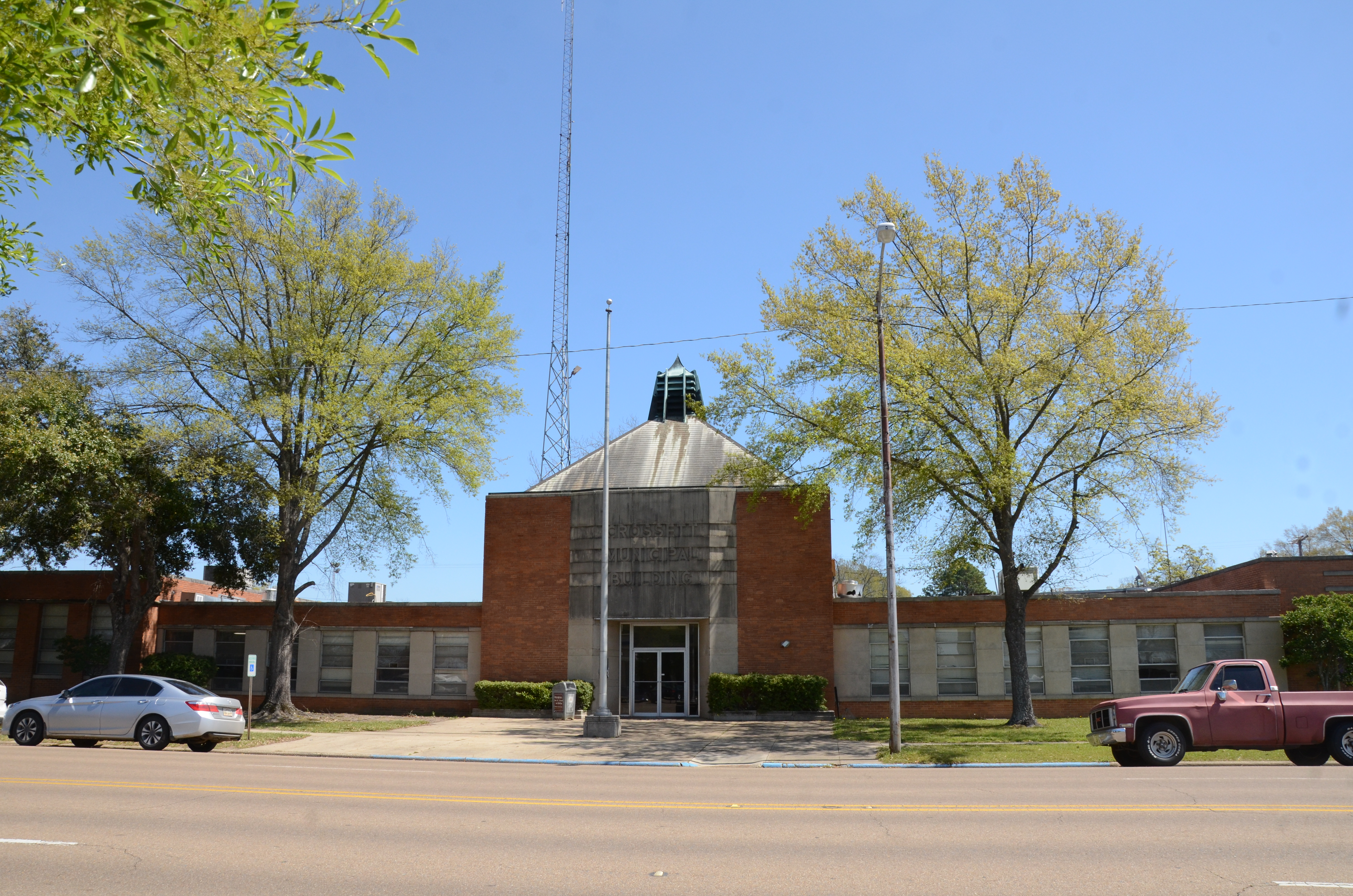

- Location within Arkansas Location within the United States
- Location: 307-309 Main St., Crossett, Arkansas
- Coordinates: 33°7′41″N 91°57′41″W
- Area: less than one acre
- Built: 1953
- Built by: C.W. Vollmer & Co.
- Architect: Trapp, Clippard & Phelps
- Architectural style: Art Deco
- NRHP reference No.: 07000966
- Added to NRHP: September 20, 2007

The Crossett Municipal Building is a historic multi-function municipal building at 307-309 Main Street in Crossett, Arkansas. The Art Deco building was designed by the firm of Trapp, Clippard & Phelps, and built in 1954 by C.W. Vollmer. Its exterior is primarily brick, with limestone trim. Prior to its construction, the municipal services of the city were scattered throughout town, and construction of this building was authorized in order to centralize them. The building was designed to house the public library in its north wing, the fire station in the south wing, and municipal offices, including the council chambers, mayor's office, and municipal court, in the center. The library moved out of its space in the 1960s, after which it was taken over by the police department.

The building was listed on the National Register of Historic Places in 2007.

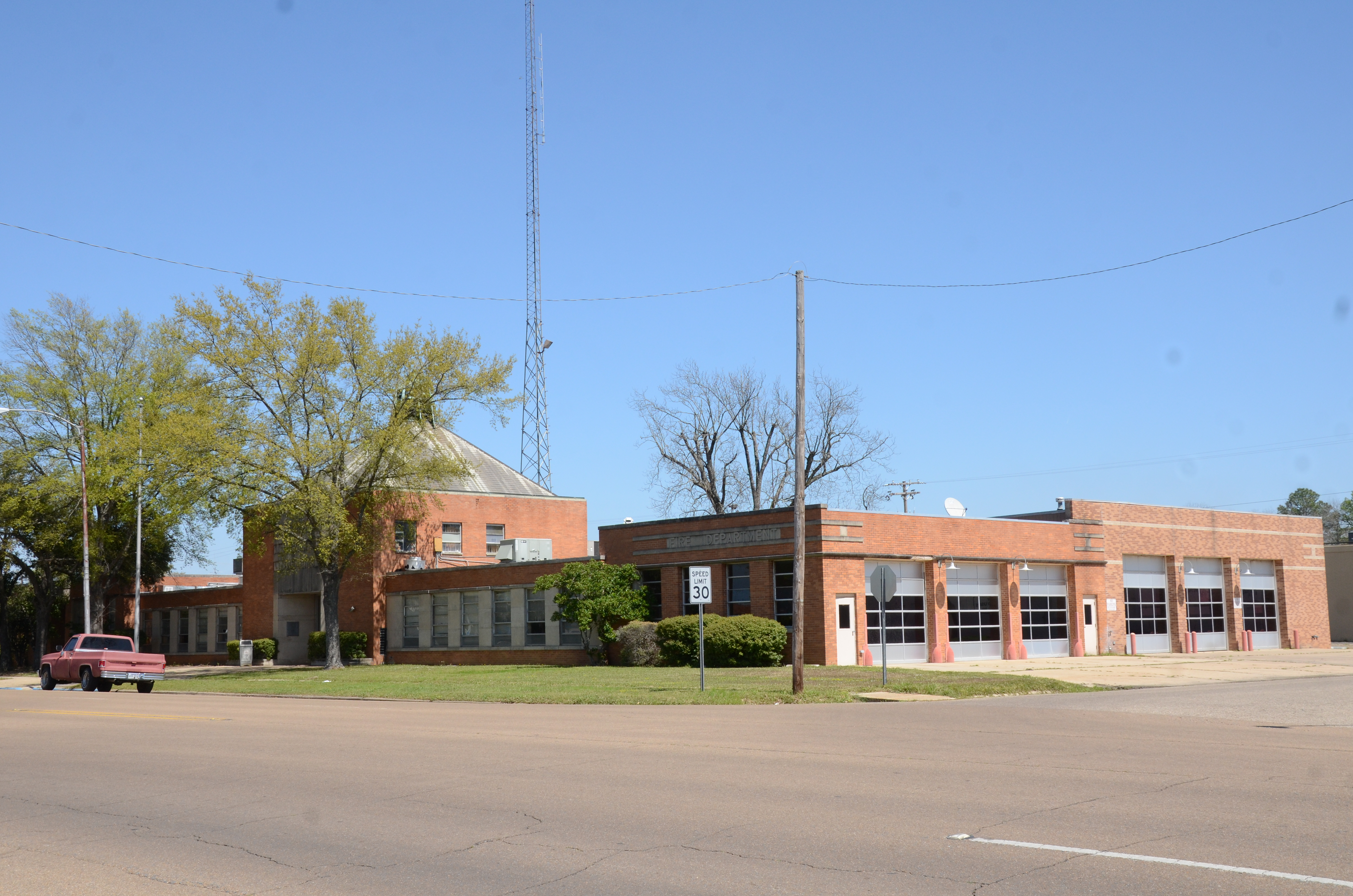
West side view, showing fire station.

== See also ==
- National Register of Historic Places listings in Ashley County, Arkansas
