= Crossett Methodist Church =

Historic church in Arkansas, United States

- U.S. National Register of Historic Places
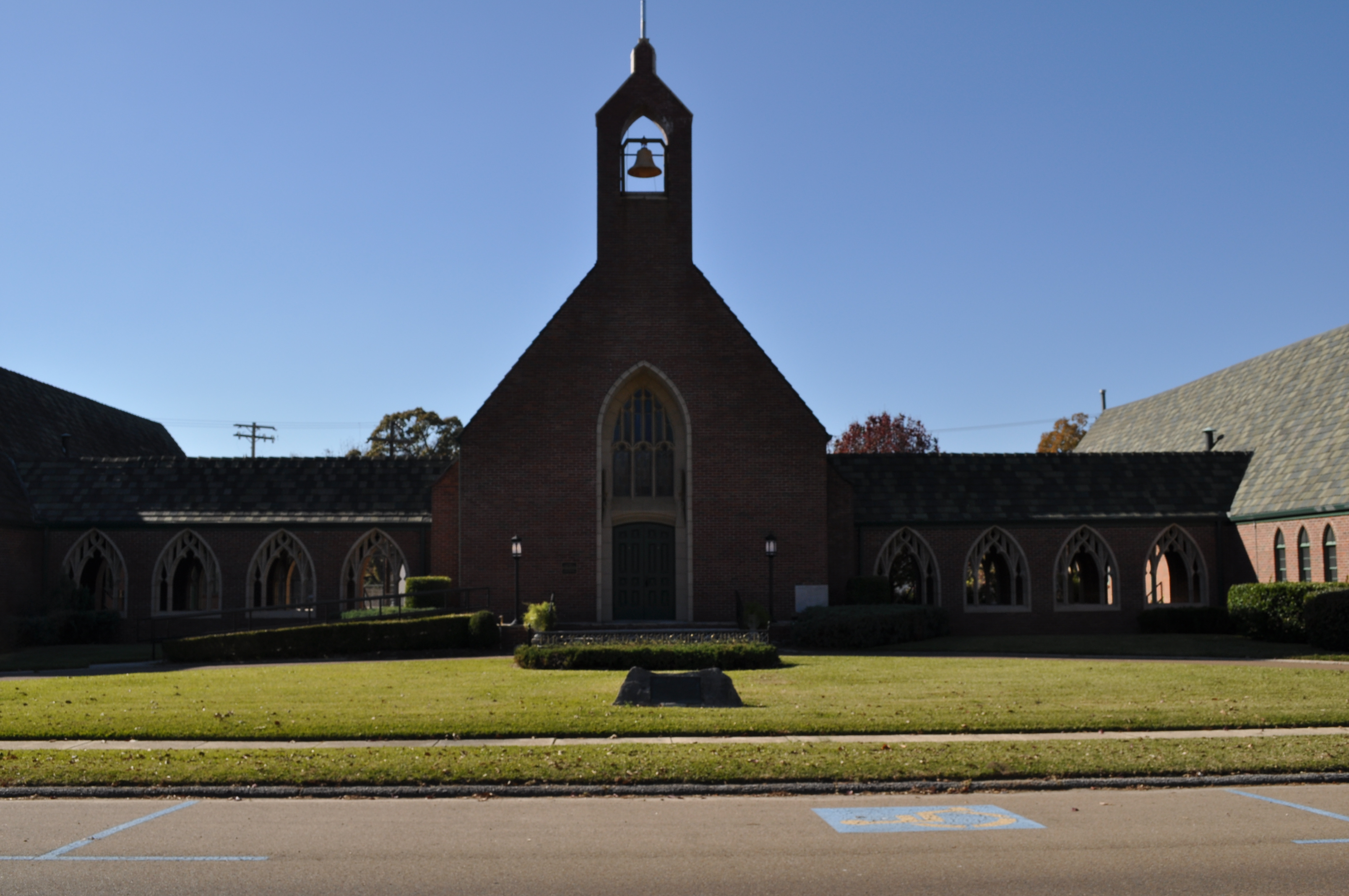

- Location within Arkansas Location within the United States
- Location: 500 Main St., Crossett, Arkansas
- Coordinates: 33°7′50″N 91°57′42″W
- Area: 2 acres (0.81 ha)
- Built: 1949
- Architect: Almand, John Parks; Trapp, Clippord & Phelps
- Architectural style: Late Gothic Revival, Tudor Revival
- NRHP reference No.: 10000018
- Added to NRHP: February 17, 2010

The Crossett Methodist Church is now known as the First Methodist Church of Crossett. It is at 500 Main St., Crossett, Arkansas, United States, and was built in 1949.

== History ==
It is the work of architect John Parks Almand and of Trapp, Clippord & Phelps. It was listed on the National Register of Historic Places on February 17, 2010.

Before 1902, a travelling Methodist minister held meetings in a tent, across from the Missouri Pacific Railroad station. The owners of Crossett Lumber Company owned all the property in town and paid the preacher. The Arkansas law in 1837 prohibited the sale of liquor within one mile of a place of worship. Overnight, a wooden church was built on the site of the tent meeting. This kept a pending saloon license from being issued, and stopped its opening in the town.

== See also ==
- National Register of Historic Places listings in Ashley County, Arkansas
