= Johnsville, Arkansas =

Unincorporated community in Arkansas, US

Coordinates: 33°22′23″N 92°00′57″W

is an unincorporated community in Bradley County, Arkansas, United States. It is situated at an elevation of 200 feet (61 meters) above mean sea level.

The total City Population for Johnsville is about 2,111 with about 2 people per square mile.

The Average Home Value is $76,900, which is roughly 26% lower than the Average Home Value of $104,207 for the state of Arkansas, and roughly 65% lower than the National Average of $217,072.

The Median Income Per Household is about $52,689, which is roughly 14% higher than the Average Median Income Per Household of $45,376 for the state of Arkansas, and roughly 19% lower higher than the National Average of $65,026.
