= Arkansas Highway 8 =

State highway in Arkansas, United States

Highway 8

Route information
- Maintained by ArDOT
- Existed: 1926–present

Section 1
- West end: SH-63 at the Oklahoma state line near Big Cedar, OK
- East end: US 59 / US 71 in Mena

Section 2
- West end: US 59 / US 71 in Mena
- Major intersections: US 70 / AR 27 in Glenwood; I-30 / AR 51 in Arkadelphia; US 67 / AR 7 in Arkadelphia
- East end: US 63 in Warren

Section 3
- West end: US 63 at Carmel
- Major intersections: US 82 / US 425 in Hamburg; US 165 in Parkdale
- East end: US 65 in Eudora

Section 4
- West end: US 65 near Eudora
- East end: US 65 at Arkla

Location
- Country: United States
- State: Arkansas
- Counties: Polk, Montgomery, Pike, Clark, Dallas, Calhoun, Cleveland, Bradley, Ashley, Chicot

Highway system
- Arkansas Highway System; Interstate; US; State; Business; Spurs; Suffixed; Scenic; Heritage
← AR 7	→ AR 9

Arkansas Highway 8 (AR 8) is a designation for four state highways in lower Arkansas. One segment runs from the Oklahoma state line east to US 59/US 71 in Mena. A second segment runs from US 59/US 71 in Mena east to US 63 in Warren. A third segment runs from US 63 at Carmel east to US 65 in Eudora. A fourth segment runs from US 65 south of Eudora to US 65 at Arkla.

== Route description ==
=== Oklahoma to Mena ===
Highway 8 begins at the Oklahoma state line as a continuation of OK-63 and runs east through the Ouachita National Forest towards US 59/US 71 west of downtown Mena, where it terminates.

=== Mena to Warren ===
The route begins at US 59/US 71 east of downtown Mena as Morrow Avenue. Highway 8 runs east with minor junctions at Highway 375, Highway 980, and Highway 370 before again entering the Ouachita National Forest near the Montgomery County line. Shortly after entering Montgomery County, Highway 8 passes the Cogburn Dipping Vat, listed on the National Register of Historic Places (NRHP), before entering Black Springs and Norman. A concurrency forms with Highway 27 in Norman, and the two routes continue south past the historic Caddo Valley Academy Complex and the Norman Town Square to exit the Ouachita National Forest and enter Pike County.

Highway 8 enters Glenwood, including junctions with Highway 8S, US 70B, and a brief concurrency with US 70. After turning south to leave US 70, Highway 27 follows US 70 west, ending the concurrency that began in Norman. The highway continues southeast to form a concurrency with Highway 84 which continues into Clark County. Highway 8/Highway 84 continue into Amity until Highway 84 turns north at a traffic circle near the Old Bank of Amity. Highway 8 continues east to Arkadelphia, where it meets Highway 26/Highway 51 just inside the city limits.

After Arkadelphia, the route is concurrent with Highway 7 until Dalark. The route continues southeast to Fordyce and on to Warren, where it terminates at US 63.

=== Carmel to Eudora ===
The route begins at Carmel and runs south to Johnsville, before continuing east to US 65 in Eudora, where it terminates.

== Major intersections ==
County	Location	mi	km	Destinations	Notes
Polk				SH-63 west – Talihina	Continuation into Oklahoma
Polk	Mena			AR 375 west	Eastern terminus of AR 375
Polk	Mena			US 59 / US 71 (Pickering Avenue) – De Queen, Fort Smith	Eastern terminus
Polk	Mena	Gap in route			
Polk	Mena			US 59 / US 71 (Pickering Avenue) – De Queen, Fort Smith	Western terminus
Polk				AR 375 south	Northern terminus of AR 375
Polk				AR 980 – Airport	
Polk				AR 370 east	Western terminus of AR 370
Montgomery	Norman			AR 27 north (North Main Street) – Mount Ida	Western end of AR 27 concurrency
Montgomery				AR 240 west – Hopper	Eastern terminus of AR 240
Pike	Glenwood			AR 8S west (Harmon Circle)	Eastern terminus of AR 8S
Pike	Glenwood			US 70B east (East Broadway)	Western terminus of US 70B
Pike	Glenwood			US 70 east – Hot Springs	Western end of US 70 concurrency
Pike	Glenwood			US 70 west (AR 27 south) – De Queen	Eastern end of US 70/AR 27 concurrency
Pike				AR 84 west – Kirby	Western end of AR 84 concurrency
Clark	Amity			AR 84 east	Roundabout; eastern end of AR 84 concurrency
Clark				AR 53 south to AR 26 – Hollywood	Northern terminus of AR 53
Clark	Arkadelphia			AR 51 south to AR 26 west – Murfreesboro, Hollywood, Crater of Diamonds State Park	Western end of AR 51 concurrency
Clark	Arkadelphia			I-30 – Malvern, Little Rock, Hope, Texarkana	Exit 73 on I-30
Clark	Arkadelphia			US 67 north / AR 7 north (North 10th Street) to I-30 east – Malvern, Henderson State University	Western end of US 67/AR 7 concurrency
Clark	Arkadelphia			US 67 south (South 6th Street)	Eastern end of US 67 concurrency
Clark				AR 51 north – Joan	Eastern end of AR 51 concurrency
Clark	Gravel Junction			AR 128 west – Joan	Eastern terminus of AR 128
Dallas				AR 7 south – Camden	Eastern end of AR 7 concurrency
Dallas	Princeton			AR 9 north – Malvern	Western end of AR 9 concurrency
Dallas				AR 9 south – Camden, Holly Springs	Eastern end of AR 9 concurrency
Dallas	Fordyce			AR 229 north	Southern terminus of AR 229
Dallas	Fordyce			US 79 / US 167 – Pine Bluff, Little Rock, Camden	
Dallas	Fordyce			US 79B south (West 4th Street)	Western end of US 79B concurrency
Dallas	Fordyce			AR 274 south (Main Street) – Dallas County Museum	Northern terminus of AR 274
Dallas	Fordyce			US 79B north (Moro Street)	Eastern end of US 79B concurrency
Dallas				AR 205 south – Tri-County Lake	Northern terminus of AR 205
Calhoun	No major junctions				
Cleveland				AR 97 north – Kingsland	Southern terminus of AR 97
Bradley				AR 189 north	Southern terminus of AR 189
Bradley	Warren			US 63 – Hermitage, Warren	Eastern terminus
Bradley	Gap in route				
Bradley	Carmel			US 63 – Hermitage, Warren	Western terminus
Bradley	Johnsville			AR 160 west – Hermitage	Eastern terminus of AR 160
Ashley				AR 160 east	Western terminus of AR 160
Ashley				AR 133 south – Crossett	Northern terminus of AR 133
Ashley	Fountain Hill			US 425 north – Monticello	Western end of US 425 concurrency
Ashley	Hamburg			US 82 east – Lake Village	Western end of US 82 concurrency
Ashley	Hamburg			AR 189 north (Washington Street) to AR 133	Southern terminus of AR 189
Ashley	Hamburg			US 82 west / US 425 south – Crossett, Bastrop, LA	Eastern end of US 82/US 425 concurrency
Ashley	Parkdale			AR 209 north	Southern terminus of AR 209
Ashley	Parkdale			US 165 – Portland, McGehee, Wilmot, Bastrop, LA	
Chicot	Eudora			AR 159 south (Main Street)	Western end of AR 159 concurrency
Chicot	Eudora			US 65 – Lake Village, Eudora, Tallulah, LA AR 159 ends	Eastern terminus; eastern terminus of AR 159
Chicot	Gap in route				
Chicot				US 65 – Lake Village, Tallulah, LA	Western terminus
Chicot	Readland			AR 209 south to US 65	Northern terminus of AR 209
Chicot	Arkla			US 65 – Louisiana, Eudora	Eastern terminus
1.000 mi = 1.609 km; 1.000 km = 0.621 mi: Concurrency terminus

== Glenwood spur ==
Harmon Street
- Location: Glenwood
- Length: 0.20 mi (320 m)
- Existed: January 8, 1987–present

Arkansas Highway 8 Spur is an east–west state highway spur route in Glenwood. The route of 0.20 miles (0.32 km) runs from Highway 8 west to a lumberyard along the Arkansas Midland Railroad tracks.

== Hamburg spur ==
Highway 8S
- Location: Hamburg
- Length: 0.9 mi (1,400 m)
- Existed: November 21, 1995–August 22, 2001

Arkansas Highway 8 Spur is a former spur route in Hamburg. The former alignment of the parent highway existed as a spur route for six years until being renumbered as Highway 189.

History

The spur was created on November 21, 1995 along a former segment of Highway 8 during major revisions to Highway 8 to improve route continuity. The roadway was renumbered to Highway 189 at the request of the Ashley County Judge.

== See also ==
- List of state highways in Arkansas
