= Parkdale, Arkansas =

- City
- Location of Parkdale in Ashley County, Arkansas.
- Coordinates: 33°07′26″N 91°32′47″W
- Country: United States
- State: Arkansas
- County: Ashley

Area
  - Total: 1.02 sq mi (2.64 km^{2})
  - Land: 1.02 sq mi (2.64 km^{2})
  - Water: 0 sq mi (0.00 km^{2})
- Elevation: 118 ft (36 m)

Population (2020)
  - Total: 172
  - Estimate (2025): 163 ▼
  - Density: 168.7/sq mi (65.12/km^{2})
- Time zone: UTC-6 (Central (CST))
  - Summer (DST): UTC-5 (CDT)
- ZIP code: 71661
- Area code: 870
- FIPS code: 05-53510
- GNIS feature ID: 2404478

Parkdale is a city in Ashley County, Arkansas, United States. As of the 2020 census, Parkdale had a population of 172.

== Geography ==
According to the United States Census Bureau, the city has a total area of 1.0 square mile (2.6 km^{2}), all land.

== History ==
In 1908, a Black man named Earnest Williams was lynched by a white mob who were "outraged" because he had used "offensive language".

== Demographics ==
Historical population
| Census | Pop. | Note | %± |
|---|---|---|---|
| 1910 | 383 | | — |
| 1920 | 284 | | −25.8% |
| 1930 | 371 | | 30.6% |
| 1940 | 278 | | −25.1% |
| 1950 | 385 | | 38.5% |
| 1960 | 448 | | 16.4% |
| 1970 | 459 | | 2.5% |
| 1980 | 471 | | 2.6% |
| 1990 | 393 | | −16.6% |
| 2000 | 377 | | −4.1% |
| 2010 | 277 | | −26.5% |
| 2020 | 172 | | −37.9% |
| 2025 (est.) | 163 | ▼ | −5.2% |
U.S. Decennial Census

=== Racial and ethnic composition ===
Parkdale city, Arkansas – Racial and ethnic composition Note: the US Census treats Hispanic/Latino as an ethnic category. This table excludes Latinos from the racial categories and assigns them to a separate category. Hispanics/Latinos may be of any race.
| Race / Ethnicity (NH = Non-Hispanic) | Pop 2000 | Pop 2010 | Pop 2020 | % 2000 | % 2010 | % 2020 |
|---|---|---|---|---|---|---|
| White alone (NH) | 111 | 81 | 48 | 29.44% | 29.24% | 27.91% |
| Black or African American alone (NH) | 247 | 184 | 117 | 65.52% | 66.43% | 68.02% |
| Native American or Alaska Native alone (NH) | 1 | 0 | 0 | 0.27% | 0.00% | 0.00% |
| Asian alone (NH) | 0 | 0 | 0 | 0.00% | 0.00% | 0.00% |
| Native Hawaiian or Pacific Islander alone (NH) | 0 | 0 | 0 | 0.00% | 0.00% | 0.00% |
| Other race alone (NH) | 0 | 0 | 0 | 0.00% | 0.00% | 0.00% |
| Mixed race or Multiracial (NH) | 8 | 0 | 4 | 2.12% | 0.00% | 2.33% |
| Hispanic or Latino (any race) | 10 | 12 | 3 | 2.65% | 4.33% | 1.74% |
| Total | 377 | 277 | 172 | 100.00% | 100.00% | 100.00% |

=== 2020 census ===
As of the 2020 United States census, there were 172 people, 89 households, and 66 families residing in the city.

=== 2000 census ===
As of the census of 2000, there were 377 people, 141 households, and 100 families residing in the city. The population density was 374.0 inhabitants per square mile (144.4/km^{2}). There were 158 housing units at an average density of 156.7 per square mile (60.5/km^{2}). The racial makeup of the city was 29.44% White, 66.84% Black or African American, 0.27% Native American, 1.33% from other races, and 2.12% from two or more races. 2.65% of the population were Hispanic or Latino of any race.

There were 141 households, out of which 30.5% had children under the age of 18 living with them, 38.3% were married couples living together, 28.4% had a female householder with no husband present, and 28.4% were non-families. 25.5% of all households were made up of individuals, and 14.9% had someone living alone who was 65 years of age or older. The average household size was 2.67 and the average family size was 3.17.

In the city, the population was spread out, with 29.4% under the age of 18, 10.3% from 18 to 24, 20.7% from 25 to 44, 21.5% from 45 to 64, and 18.0% who were 65 years of age or older. The median age was 36 years. For every 100 females, there were 88.5 males. For every 100 females age 18 and over, there were 78.5 males.

The median income for a household in the city was $16,188, and the median income for a family was $16,875. Males had a median income of $24,375 versus $14,659 for females. The per capita income for the city was $9,050. About 43.5% of families and 49.9% of the population were below the poverty line, including 74.6% of those under age 18 and 24.7% of those age 65 or over.

== Education ==
Public education is provide to elementary and secondary school students from the Hamburg School District leading to graduation from Hamburg High School.

It was served by the Parkdale School District until July 1, 1994, when it consolidated into Hamburg SD.

== Notable people ==
- Danny Davis (born 1941) – U.S. representative for Illinois
