= Hamburg, Arkansas =

City in Arkansas

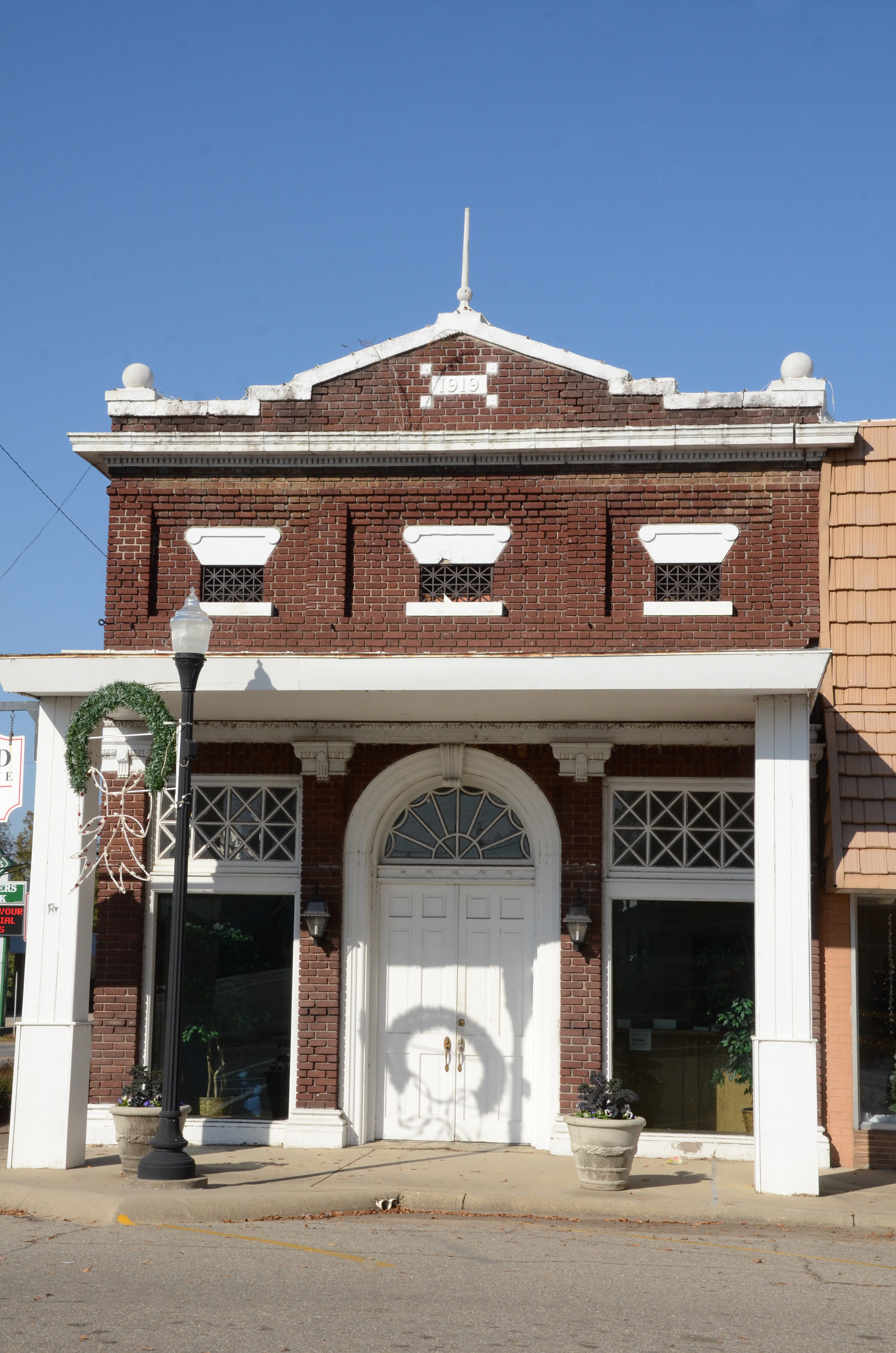

- Flag Seal

- Location of Hamburg in Ashley County, Arkansas.
- Coordinates: 33°13′29″N 91°47′50″W
- Country: United States
- State: Arkansas
- County: Ashley

Government
  - Mayor: David Streeter

Area
  - Total: 3.44 sq mi (8.90 km^{2})
  - Land: 3.44 sq mi (8.90 km^{2})
  - Water: 0 sq mi (0.00 km^{2})
- Elevation: 177 ft (54 m)

Population (2020)
  - Total: 2,536
  - Estimate (2025): 2,364 ▼
  - Density: 738.2/sq mi (285.03/km^{2})
- Time zone: UTC-6 (Central (CST))
  - Summer (DST): UTC-5 (CDT)
- ZIP code: 71646
- Area code: 870
- FIPS code: 05-29500
- GNIS feature ID: 2403784
- Website: cityofhamburg.com

Hamburg is a city in and the county seat of Ashley County, Arkansas, United States. The population was 2,536 at the 2020 census. The population declined by more than 10% between 2010 and 2020, resulting in a lower tax base for the region. It is the home town of NBA player Scottie Pippen. The City of Hamburg crest has a picture of a gazebo, trees, cotton, and deer.

== History ==
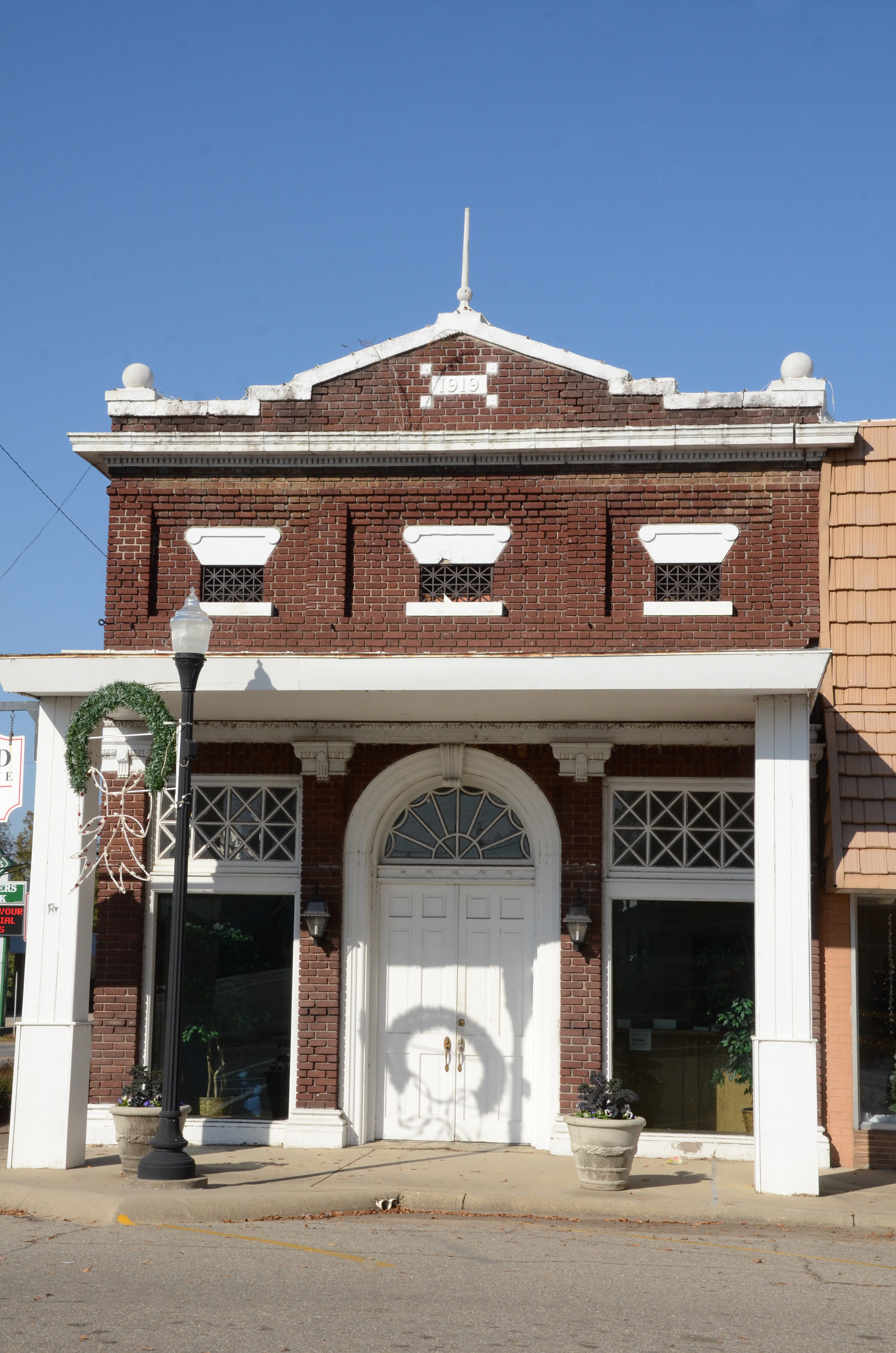

The Hamburg Commercial Historic District is a two-block area centered around the town square that includes twenty-four buildings, most of which are brick structures built before 1920. The former site of the Ashley County Courthouse is now a grassy park with a gazebo. It was listed on the National Register of Historic Places in 2009.

== Geography ==
According to the United States Census Bureau, the city has a total area of 3.4 square miles (8.8 km^{2}), all land.

=== Climate ===
The climate in this area is characterized by hot, humid summers and generally mild to cool winters. According to the Köppen Climate Classification system, Hamburg has a humid subtropical climate, abbreviated "Cfa" on climate maps.

Climate data for Hamburg, Arkansas (1991-2020)
Month	Jan	Feb	Mar	Apr	May	Jun	Jul	Aug	Sep	Oct	Nov	Dec	Year
Mean daily maximum °F (°C)	54.3 (12.4)	58.8 (14.9)	67.1 (19.5)	75.2 (24.0)	82.5 (28.1)	89.3 (31.8)	92.1 (33.4)	92.3 (33.5)	87.5 (30.8)	77.4 (25.2)	65.3 (18.5)	56.7 (13.7)	74.9 (23.8)
Daily mean °F (°C)	43.8 (6.6)	47.5 (8.6)	55.3 (12.9)	63.5 (17.5)	71.8 (22.1)	79.0 (26.1)	81.9 (27.7)	81.4 (27.4)	75.6 (24.2)	64.6 (18.1)	53.6 (12.0)	46.2 (7.9)	63.7 (17.6)
Mean daily minimum °F (°C)	33.2 (0.7)	36.2 (2.3)	43.5 (6.4)	51.7 (10.9)	61.0 (16.1)	68.7 (20.4)	71.7 (22.1)	70.4 (21.3)	63.7 (17.6)	51.8 (11.0)	41.8 (5.4)	35.7 (2.1)	52.5 (11.4)
Average precipitation inches (mm)	5.02 (128)	5.31 (135)	5.20 (132)	5.86 (149)	4.73 (120)	4.29 (109)	4.34 (110)	3.93 (100)	3.52 (89)	4.44 (113)	4.30 (109)	5.37 (136)	56.31 (1,430)
Average dew point °F (°C)	35.7 (2.1)	38.6 (3.7)	44.7 (7.1)	53.0 (11.7)	62.6 (17.0)	69.7 (20.9)	72.5 (22.5)	71.0 (21.7)	65.1 (18.4)	54.7 (12.6)	45.2 (7.3)	38.8 (3.8)	54.3 (12.4)
Source: PRISM Climate Group

== Demographics ==
Historical population
Census	Pop.	Note	%±
1880	747		—
1890	655		−12.3%
1900	1,260		92.4%
1910	1,787		41.8%
1920	1,538		−13.9%
1930	1,517		−1.4%
1940	1,939		27.8%
1950	2,655		36.9%
1960	2,904		9.4%
1970	3,102		6.8%
1980	3,394		9.4%
1990	3,098		−8.7%
2000	3,039		−1.9%
2010	2,857		−6.0%
2020	2,536		−11.2%
2025 (est.)	2,364	▼	−6.8%
U.S. Decennial Census

=== 2020 census ===
As of the 2020 census, Hamburg had a population of 2,536. The median age was 40.2 years. 25.3% of residents were under the age of 18 and 17.2% of residents were 65 years of age or older. For every 100 females there were 89.0 males, and for every 100 females age 18 and over there were 85.1 males age 18 and over.

0.0% of residents lived in urban areas, while 100.0% lived in rural areas.

There were 1,016 households in Hamburg, of which 32.7% had children under the age of 18 living in them. Of all households, 42.7% were married-couple households, 17.5% were households with a male householder and no spouse or partner present, and 36.3% were households with a female householder and no spouse or partner present. About 30.8% of all households were made up of individuals and 14.1% had someone living alone who was 65 years of age or older.

There were 1,222 housing units, of which 16.9% were vacant. The homeowner vacancy rate was 3.0% and the rental vacancy rate was 13.2%.

Hamburg racial composition
Race	Num.	Perc.
White (non-Hispanic)	1,398	55.13%
Black or African American (non-Hispanic)	628	24.76%
Native American	1	0.04%
Asian	4	0.16%
Pacific Islander	2	0.08%
Other/Mixed	73	2.88%
Hispanic or Latino	430	16.96%

=== 2000 census ===
At the 2000 census there were 3,039 people in 1,158 households, including 802 families, in the city. The population density was 890.4 inhabitants per square mile (343.8/km^{2}). There were 1,264 housing units at an average density of 370.3 per square mile (143.0/km^{2}). The racial makeup of the city was 60.32% White, 33.63% Black or African American, 0.36% Native American, 0.13% Asian, 0.10% Pacific Islander, 3.62% from other races, and 1.84% from two or more races. 6.55% of the population were Hispanic or Latino of any race. Of the 1,158 households 33.6% had children under the age of 18 living with them, 49.7% were married couples living together, 16.0% had a female householder with no husband present, and 30.7% were non-families. 27.7% of households were one person and 15.1% were one person aged 65 or older. The average household size was 2.55 and the average family size was 3.12.

The age distribution was 27.9% under the age of 18, 7.9% from 18 to 24, 26.5% from 25 to 44, 20.4% from 45 to 64, and 17.3% 65 or older. The median age was 37 years. For every 100 females, there were 89.9 males. For every 100 females age 18 and over, there were 84.4 males.

The median household income was $26,189 and the median family income was $36,875. Males had a median income of $28,696 versus $20,750 for females. The per capita income for the city was $14,599. About 20.8% of families and 25.2% of the population were below the poverty line, including 35.1% of those under age 18 and 19.9% of those age 65 or over.

== Culture ==
Hamburg is home-base to the Armadillo Festival, held the first weekend in May since 1970.

In April 1855, a local slave Abby Guy sued for her freedom and a trial was held in Hamburg. A jury of twelve white men found in her favor and set her free, but the decision was reversed by the Arkansas Supreme Court. Two more jury trials were then held and she was eventually freed.

== Government ==
The current mayor of Hamburg is David Streeter. Former mayors include Dane Weindorf, Maxwell Hill, Thomas Crow Hundley, and Gordon Hennington.

== Water Quality ==
The 2023 Annual Drinking Water Quality Report for Hamburg Water Department found lead and copper in the city's water supply, though not at levels to cause concern.

== Education ==
Public education for elementary and secondary school students is provided by the Hamburg School District, which is one of the two public school districts in Ashley County. In 2012, Hamburg High School was nationally recognized as a silver medalist and the No. 1737 (national rank) and No. 14 (state rank) in the Best High Schools Report developed by U.S. News & World Report.

== Notable people ==
- Harry Kane (born Harry Cohen), Major League Baseball pitcher from 1902 - 1906
- Van. H. Manning, Confederate States Army colonel and U.S. Representative from Mississippi
- The Martins, Gospel trio
- Stevi Perry, Miss Arkansas Teen USA 2008, Miss Teen USA 2008
- Scottie Pippen, NBA basketball player and hall of famer, born in Hamburg in 1965
- Charles Portis, author of True Grit

== Gallery ==
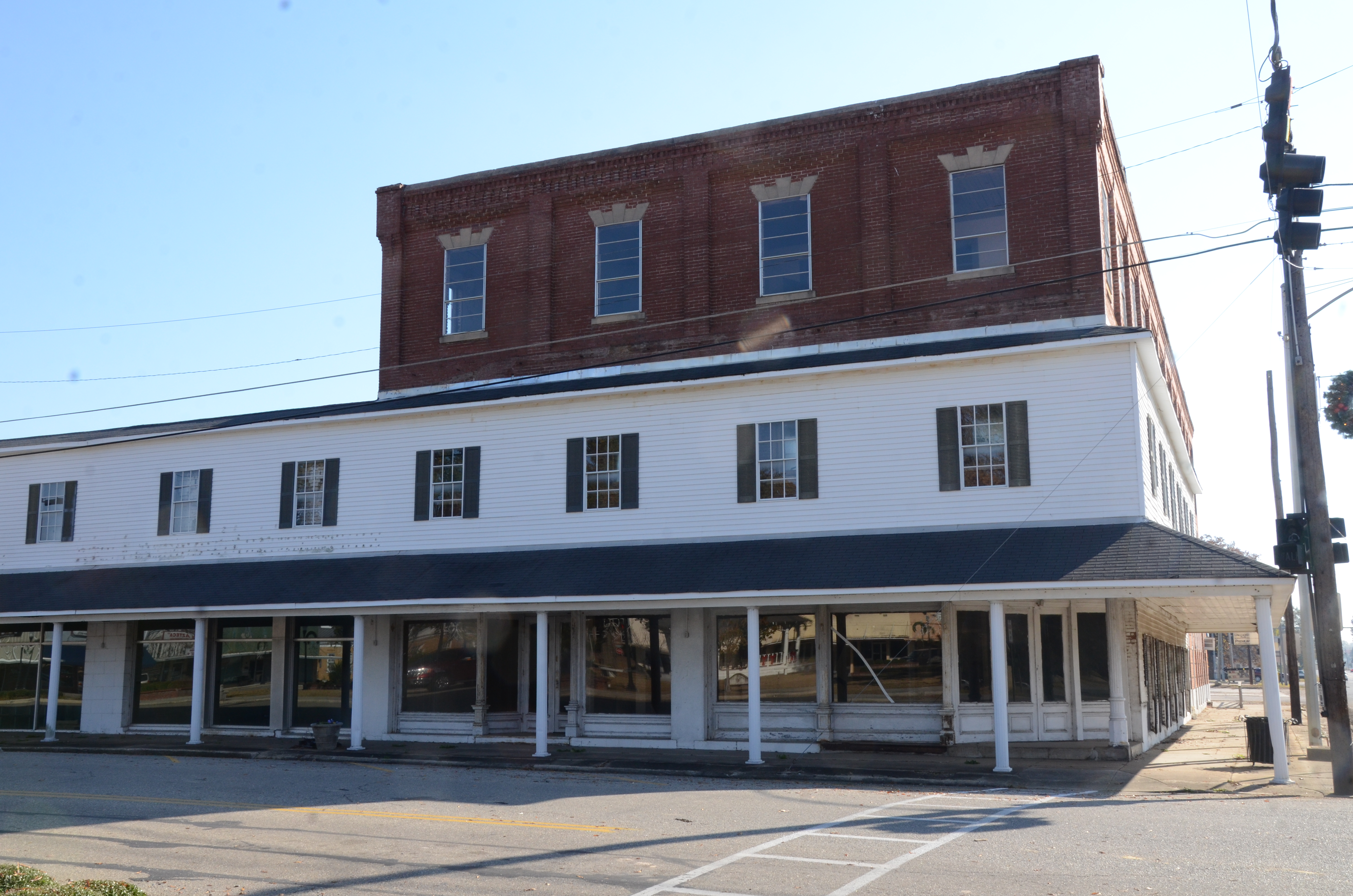

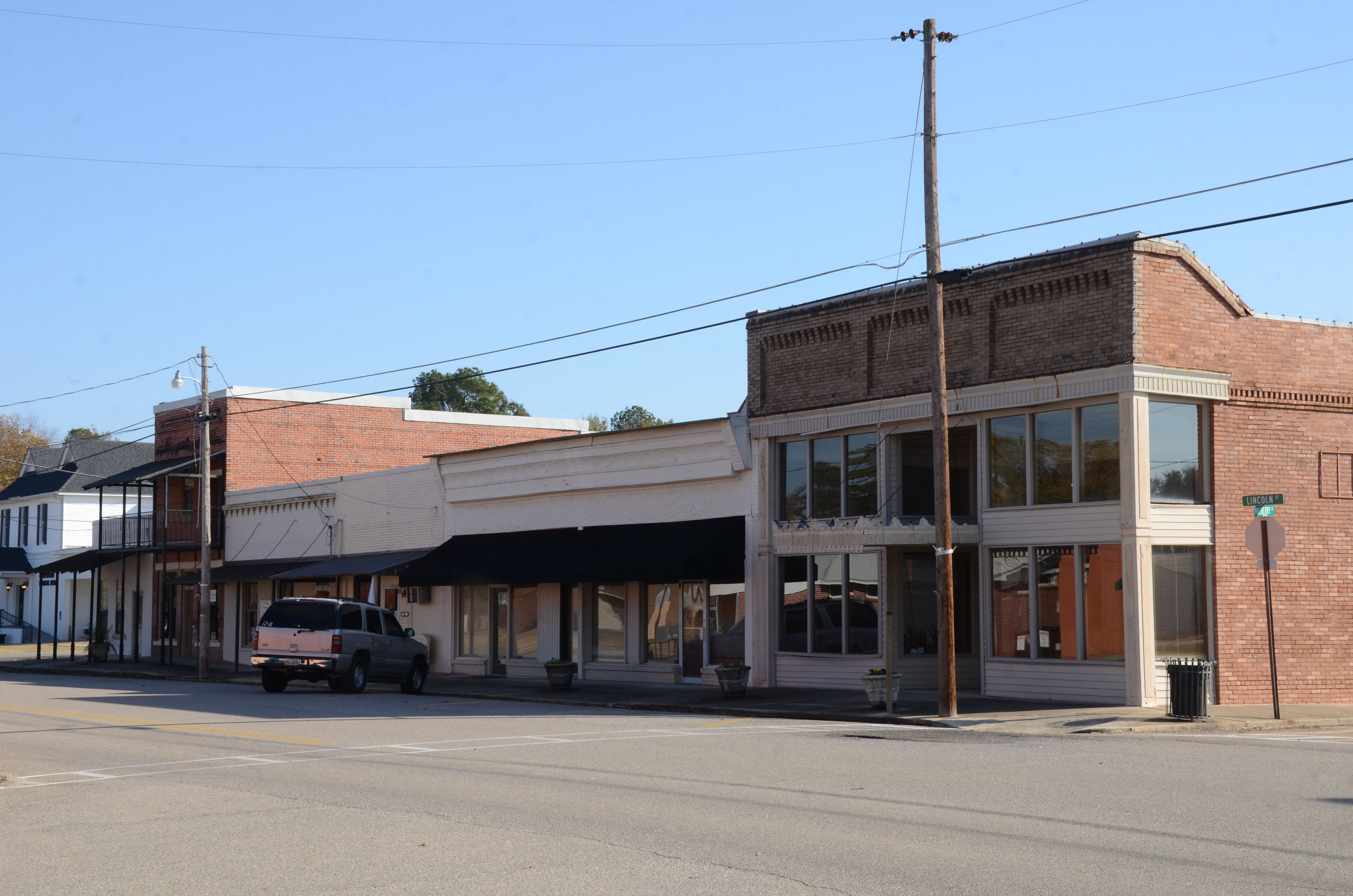

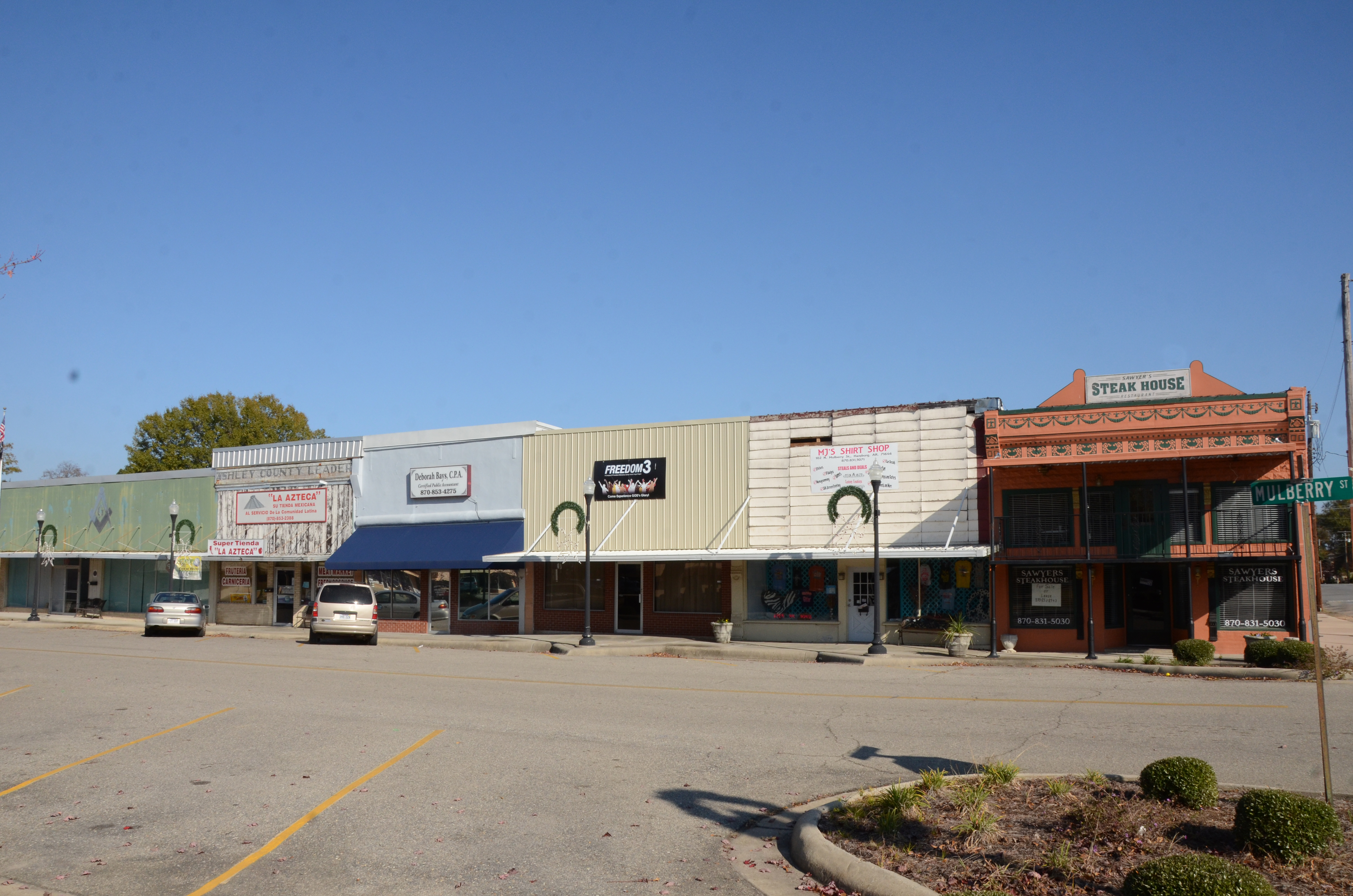

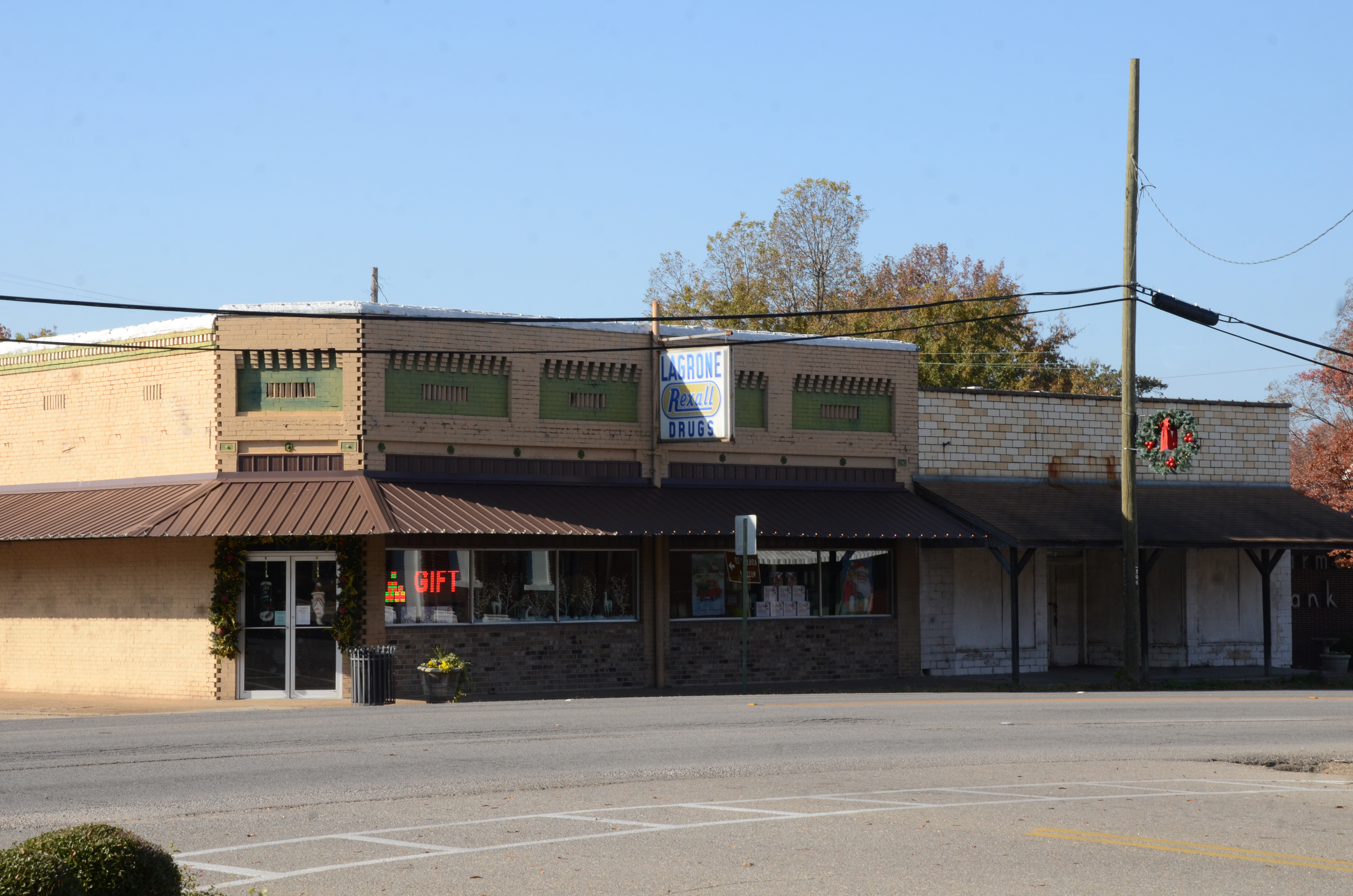
