= Berger House =

Berger House may refer to:

- Jacob Berger House, Nome, Alaska, listed on the National Register of Historic Places (NRHP) in Nome, Alaska
- Berger House (Jonesboro, Arkansas), listed on the NRHP in Craighead County, Arkansas
- Berger-Graham House, Jonesboro, Arkansas, listed on the NRHP in Craighead County, Arkansas
- Berger-Kiel House, Mascoutah, Illinois, NRHP-listed
- Berger House (Abilene, Kansas), NRHP-listed
- Berger Farmstead, Badger, South Dakota, listed on the NRHP in Kingsbury County, South Dakota
