= Edward L. Westbrooke Building =

- U.S. National Register of Historic Places
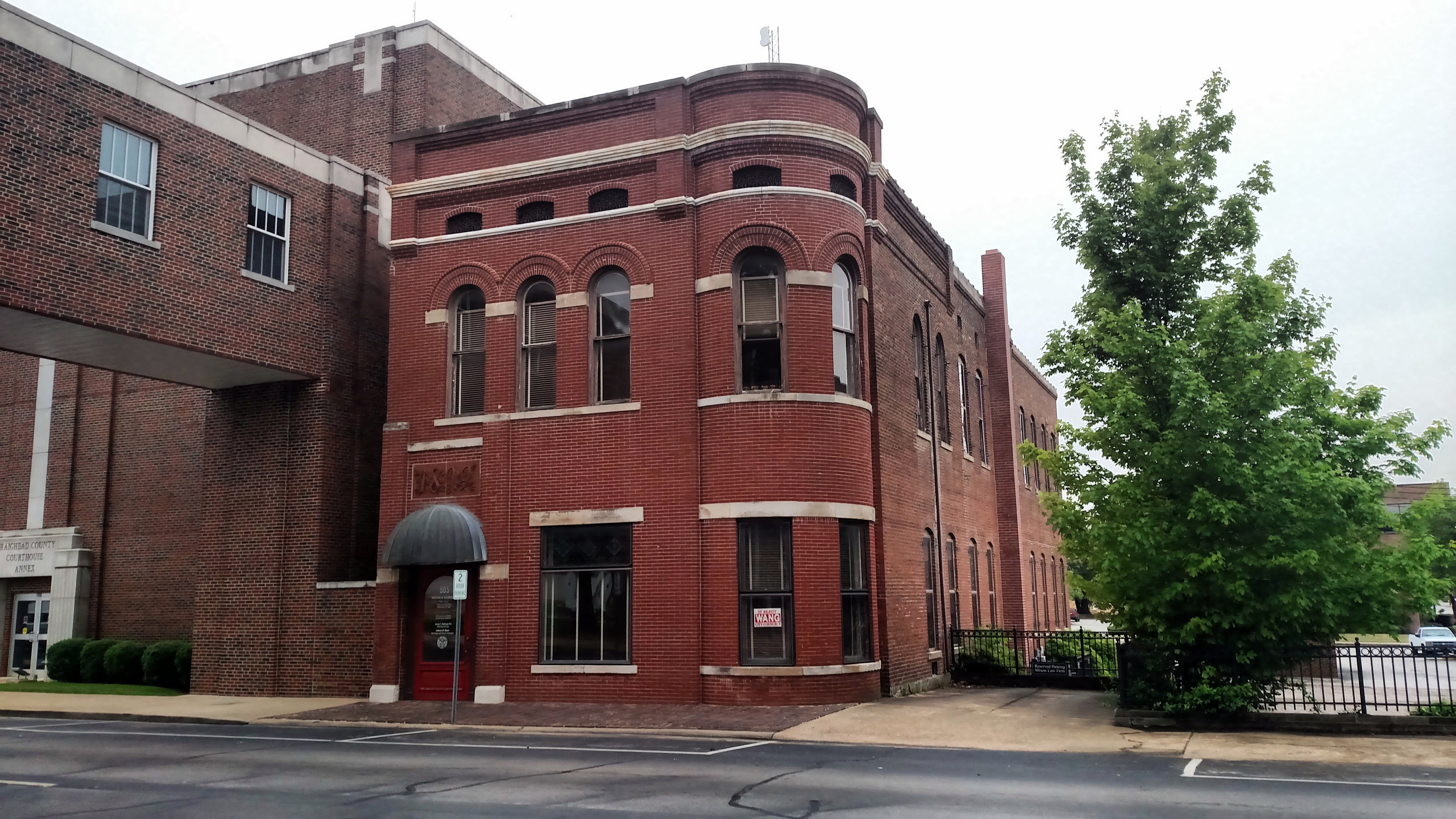

- Location within Arkansas Location within the United States
- Location: 505 Union Street; Jonesboro, Arkansas
- Coordinates: 35°50′16″N 90°42′21″W
- Area: less than one acre
- Built: 1899
- Architectural style: Romanesque
- NRHP reference No.: 02001675
- Added to NRHP: January 8, 2003

The Edward L. Westbrooke Building is a historic commercial building at 505 Union Street in Jonesboro, Arkansas. It is a two-story brick structure, located across the street from the Craighead County Courthouse on a prominent street corner in downtown Jonesboro. It has pronounced Romanesque styling, with arched windows, a recessed entry at the corner below an engaged rounded tower section. It was built in 1899 to house professional offices on the first level and the local Masonic lodge upstairs.

The building was listed on the National Register of Historic Places in 2003.

== See also ==
- National Register of Historic Places listings in Craighead County, Arkansas
