= Elmer A. Stuck =

American architect (1900–1978)

- Born: February 2, 1900; Jonesboro, Arkansas
- Died: July 11, 1978 (aged 78); Jonesboro, Arkansas
- Occupation: Architect
- Practice: Elmer A. Stuck; Almand & Stuck; Elmer A. Stuck & Associates; Stuck, Frier, Lane & Scott; Stuck Frier Lane Scott Beisner

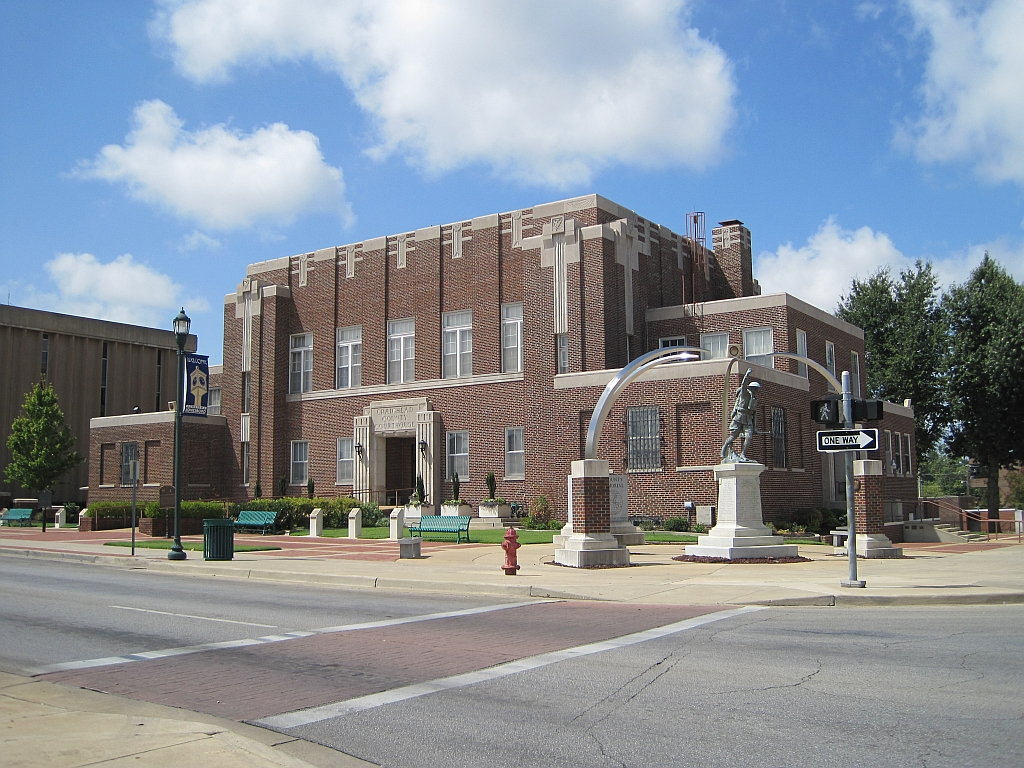
The Craighead County Courthouse in Jonesboro, designed by Stuck and completed in 1934.

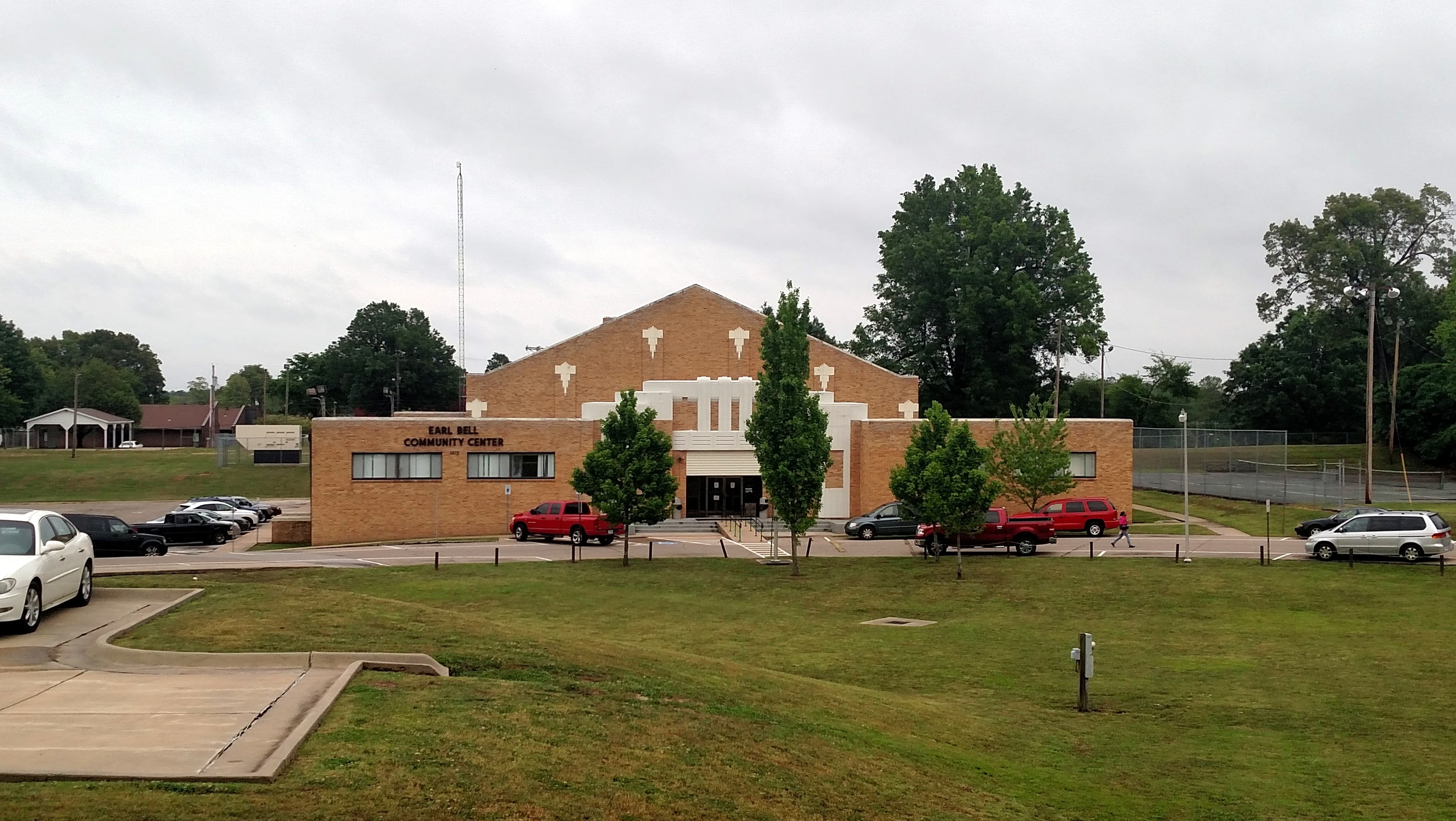
The Community Center No. 1 in Jonesboro, designed by Stuck and completed in 1936.

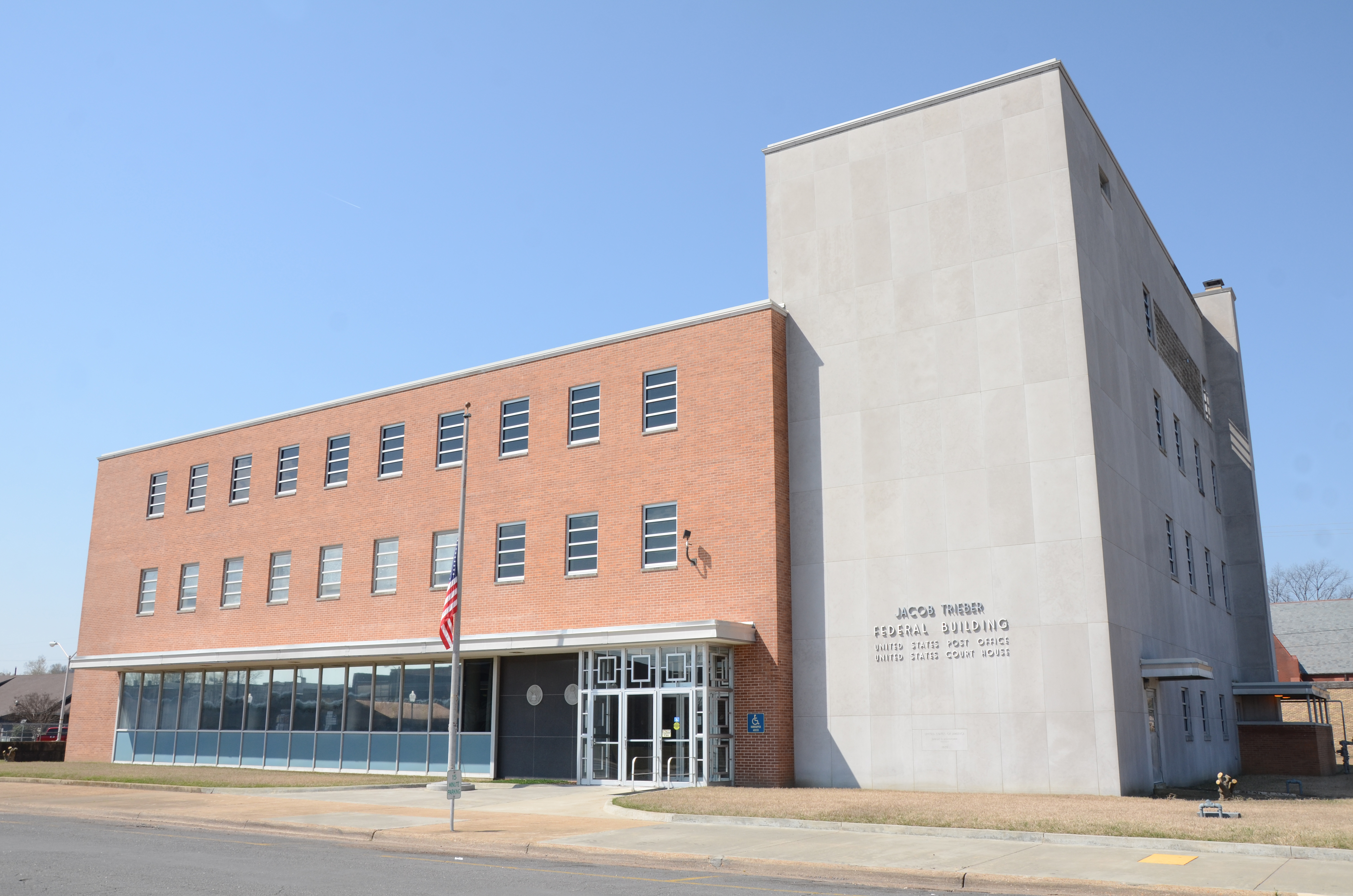
The Jacob Trieber Federal Building, United States Post Office, and United States Court House in Helena, designed by associated architects Edward F. Brueggeman and Elmer A. Stuck & Associates and completed in 1961.

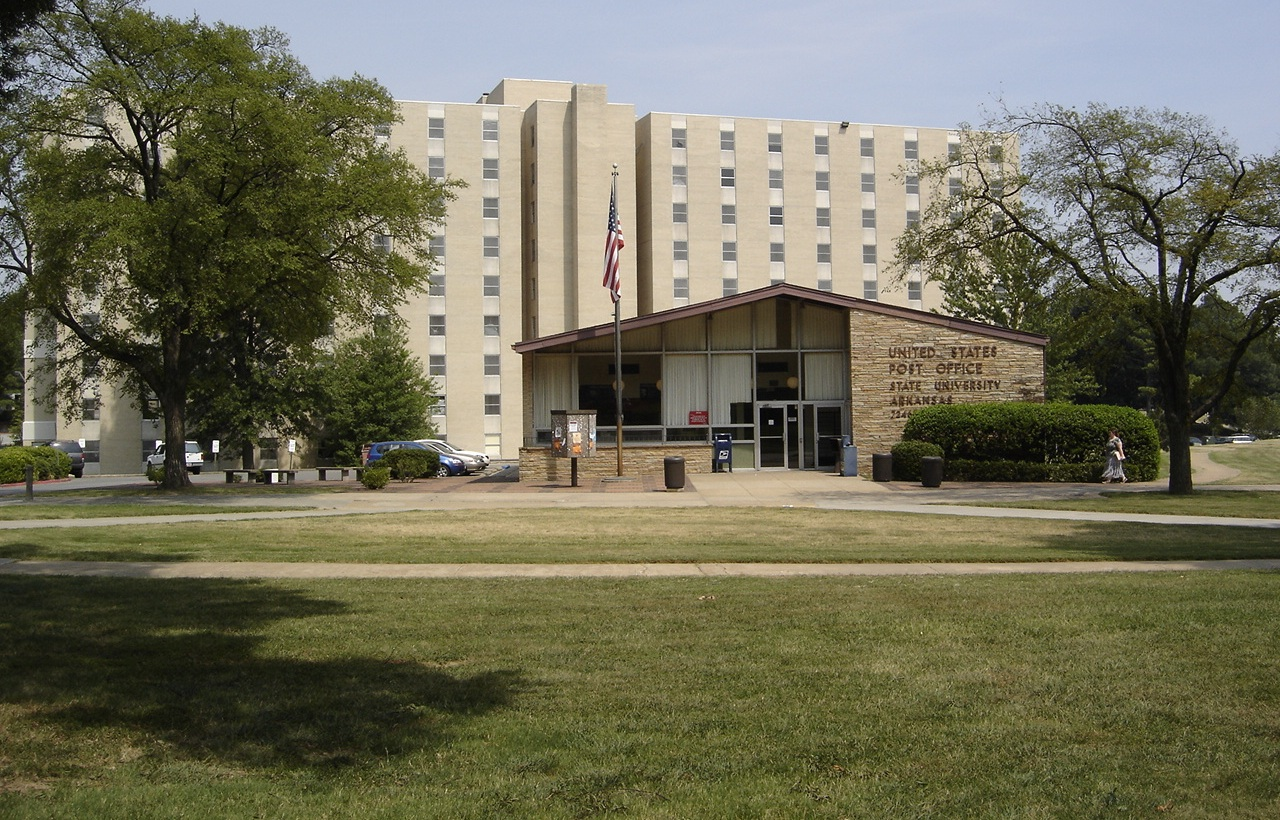
The former Twin Towers dormitories of Arkansas State University, designed by Stuck, Frier, Lane & Scott and completed in 1967. Demolished in 2008.

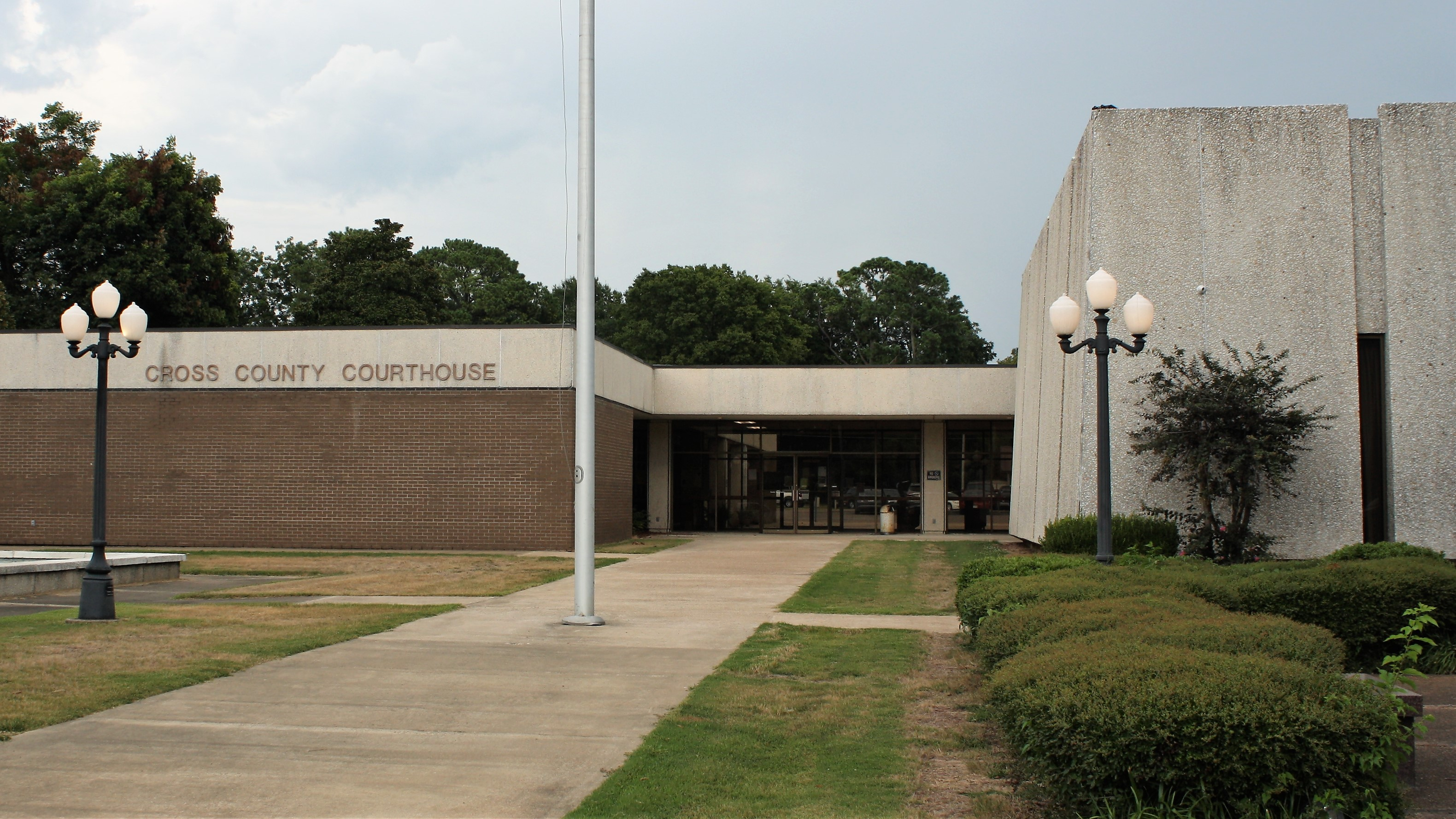
The Cross County Courthouse in Wynne, designed by Stuck, Frier, Lane & Scott and completed in 1969.

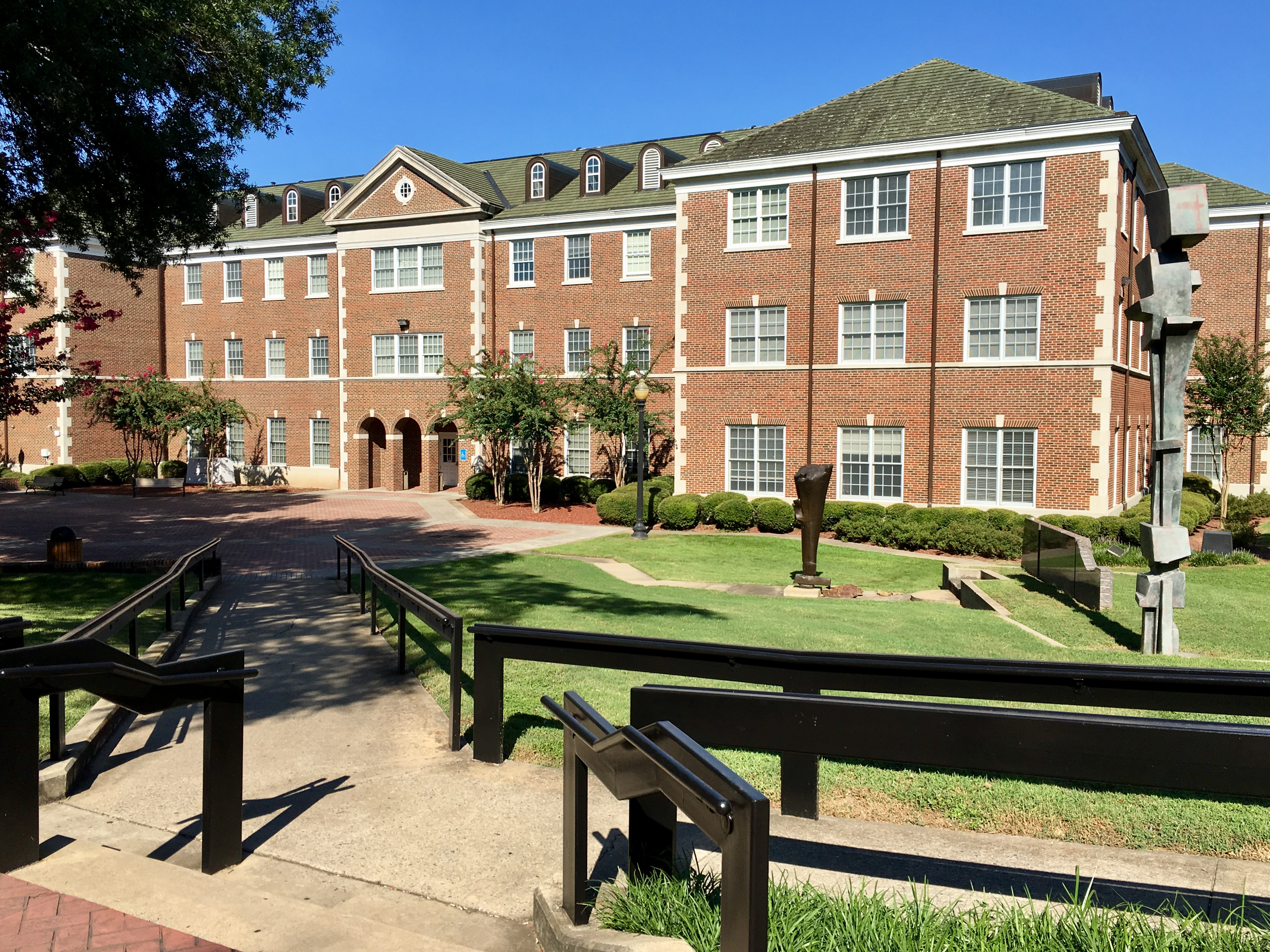
Irby Hall of the University of Central Arkansas, designed by The Stuck Associates and completed in 1993.

Elmer A. Stuck AIA (February 2, 1900 – July 11, 1978) was an American architect in practice in Jonesboro, Arkansas from 1926 until his death in 1978. Stuck and his partners developed the leading architectural practice in the Arkansas Delta and were responsible for major projects throughout the state, including the Medical Arts Building in Hot Springs, the federal building in Helena, three county courthouses and much of the campus of Arkansas State University.

== Life and career ==
Elmer Axtell Stuck was born February 2, 1900 in Jonesboro to Elmer C. Stuck and Bessie M. Stuck, née Axtell. He was educated at Washington and Lee University and at Washington University in St. Louis, graduating from the latter in 1924 with a BArch. He worked for LaBeaume & Klein in St. Louis until 1926, when he returned to Jonesboro to open his own office. From 1928 to 1931 he worked in partnership with John Parks Almand, with whom he designed the Medical Arts Building (1930) in Hot Springs, which was the tallest building in Arkansas until 1960. He then worked independently until 1949, when he reorganized his firm as Elmer A. Stuck & Associates. In 1961 he elevated three associates, Sid Frier, William H. Lane and Aubrey E. Scott Jr., to partners, and the firm was renamed Stuck, Frier, Lane & Scott. In the 1960s the firm was responsible for a major expansion of the Arkansas State University campus. In 1971 the firm was renamed Stuck Frier Lane Scott Beisner to include Dewaine Beisner. About this time a second office was opened in Little Rock, under Frier's management. Stuck was head of the firm until his death.

Stuck was a member of the American Institute of Architects (AIA) and for many years sat on the State Board of Architects.

== Personal life ==
Stuck was married in 1922 to Ruth Jane Diamant and had three children. He died July 11, 1978 in Jonesboro at the age of 78.

== Legacy ==
At least four buildings designed by Stuck and his partners have been listed on the United States National Register of Historic Places, and others contribute to listed historic districts. During his lifetime, the firm was the leader in architectural practice in the Arkansas Delta.

After Stuck's death, his firm was continued under the leadership of his partners. In 1983 the firm was renamed The Stuck Associates. Frier died in 1985 and Scott retired in 1991. In 1996 and 2004 the firm was led by Beisner in Jonesboro and by Gene Castin in Little Rock. By the latter year, the firm had been renamed Stuck Associates Architects. The firm went out of business in 2019.

== Architectural works ==
=== Elmer A. Stuck, 1926–1928 and 1931–1949 ===
- 1934 – Craighead County Courthouse, (Note: NRHP-listed.) 511 Main St, Jonesboro, Arkansas
- 1936 – Community Center No. 1, 1212 S Church St, Jonesboro, Arkansas

=== Almand & Stuck, 1928–1931 ===
- 1930 – Medical Arts Building, 236 Central Ave, Hot Springs, Arkansas

=== Elmer A. Stuck & Associates, 1949–1961 ===
- 1958 – Jonesboro City Hall (former), 314 W Washington Ave, Jonesboro, Arkansas
- 1958 – St. Michael Catholic Church, 411 N. Missouri St, West Memphis, Arkansas
- 1960 – Temple Israel, 203 W Oak Ave, Jonesboro, Arkansas
- 1961 – Jacob Trieber Federal Building, United States Post Office, and United States Court House, (Note: Designed by Edward F. Brueggeman and Elmer A. Stuck & Associates, associated architects. NRHP-listed.) 617 Walnut St, Helena, Arkansas

=== Stuck, Frier, Lane & Scott, 1961–1971 ===
- 1962 – Nettleton Church of Christ, 3521 East Highland Dr, Jonesboro, Arkansas
- 1962 – University Hall, (Note: A contributing resource to the Arkansas State College Historic District, NRHP-listed in 2024.) Arkansas State University, Jonesboro, Arkansas
- 1963 – Arkansas Hall, Arkansas State University, Jonesboro, Arkansas
- 1963 – Dean B. Ellis Library, Arkansas State University, Jonesboro, Arkansas
- 1964 – Craighead County Library, 315 W Oak Ave, Jonesboro, Arkansas
- 1964 – Carl R. Reng Student Union, Arkansas State University, Jonesboro, Arkansas
- 1965 – Administration Building, Arkansas State University, Jonesboro, Arkansas
- 1966 – Kays Hall, Arkansas State University, Jonesboro, Arkansas
- 1966 – St. Paul United Methodist Church, 2201 South Culberhouse St, Jonesboro, Arkansas
- 1967 – Fine Arts Center, Arkansas State University, Jonesboro, Arkansas
- 1967 – Harrisburg Municipal Building, 202 N East St, Harrisburg, Arkansas
- 1967 – Sharp County Courthouse, 718 Ash Flat Dr, Ash Flat, Arkansas
- 1967 – Twin Towers, (Note: Demolished.) Arkansas State University, Jonesboro, Arkansas
- 1968 – St. Joseph the Worker Catholic Church, 1415 Harb St, Corning, Arkansas
- 1969 – Cross County Courthouse, 705 Union Ave, Wynne, Arkansas
- 1969 – Terminal, Jonesboro Municipal Airport, Jonesboro, Arkansas

=== Stuck Frier Lane Scott Beisner, 1971–1983 ===
- 1976 – United Federal Savings and Loan Association building, 515 W Washington Ave, Jonesboro, Arkansas
- 1982 – Mid-America Science Museum, (Note: Designed by E. Verner Johnson & Associates and Stuck Frier Lane Scott Beisne, associated architects.) 500 Mid America Blvd, Hot Springs, Arkansas
- 1984 – John L. McClellan Memorial Veterans Hospital, (Note: Designed by a joint venture led by Gyo Obata of Hellmuth, Obata & Kassabaum and including Cromwell, Neyland, Truemper, Levy & Gatchell and Wellborn Hardwick Henderson of Little Rock, Mott, Mobley, Richter, McGowan & Griffin of Fort Smith and Stuck Frier Lane Scott Beisner.) 4300 W 7th St, Little Rock, Arkansas

=== Stuck Associates, from 1983 ===
- 1993 – Irby Hall, University of Central Arkansas, Conway, Arkansas
- 2006 – Southern Tenant Farmers Museum, (Note: The conversion of several historic buildings, all part of the Tyronza Commercial Historic District, into a historical museum.) 117 N Main St, Tyronza, Arkansas
