= Portland United Methodist Church =

Historic church in Arkansas, United States

- U.S. National Register of Historic Places
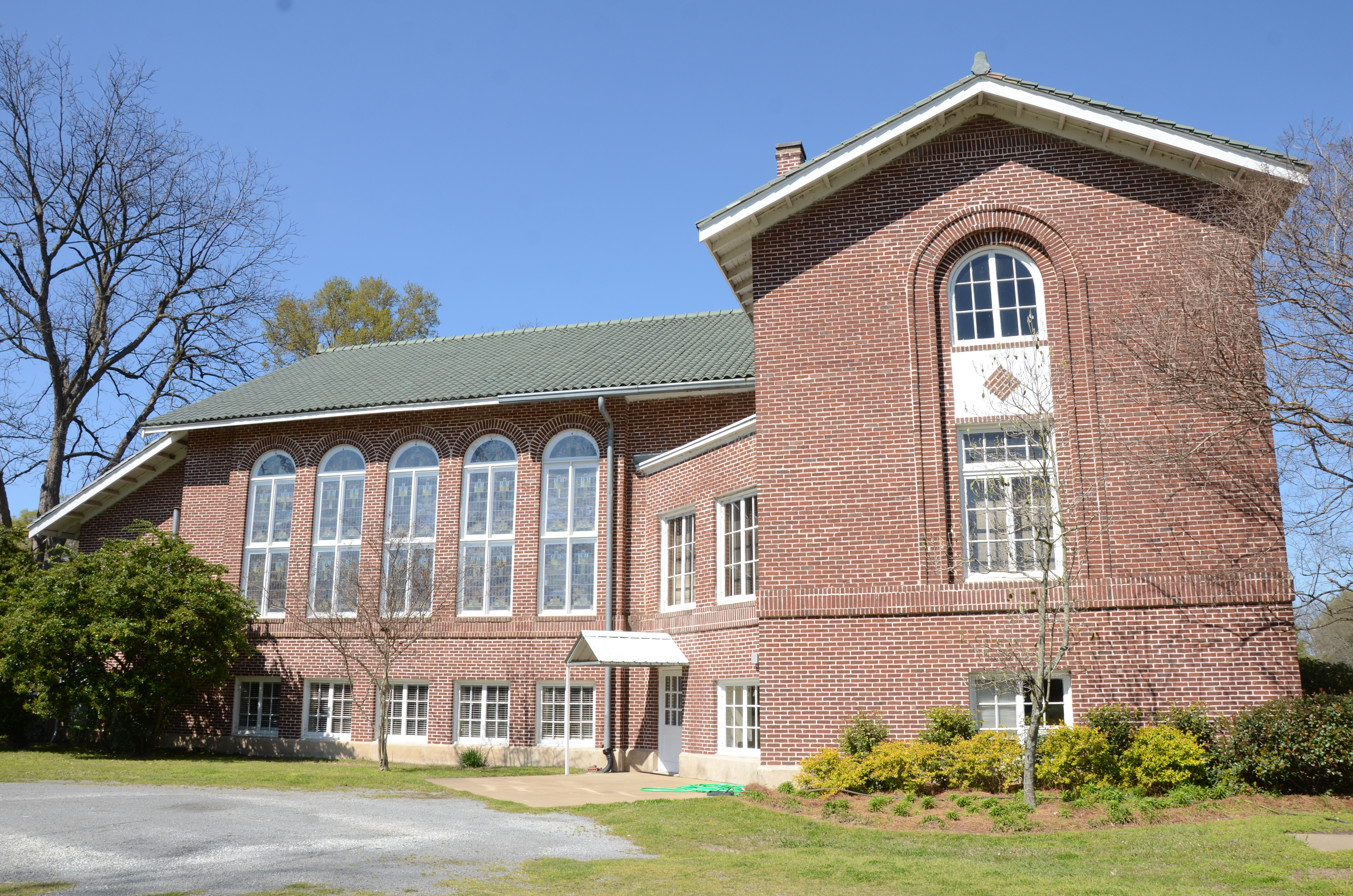

- Location within Arkansas Location within the United States
- Location: 300 N. Main St., Portland, Arkansas
- Coordinates: 33°14′28″N 91°30′41″W
- Area: less than one acre
- Built: 1924
- Built by: Horton, B.B.
- Architect: John Parks Almand
- Architectural style: Bungalow/Craftsman
- NRHP reference No.: 06000942
- Added to NRHP: October 18, 2006

The Portland United Methodist Church is a historic church building at 300 N. Main St. in Portland, Arkansas The Craftsman style two story T-shaped building was built in 1924 to a design by architect John Parks Almand. The building is faced in brick laid in a running bond pattern. The roof is ceramic tile, with broad overhanging eaves supported by distinctive triangular knee braces. The building is the largest and most prominent building in Portland's small downtown area.

The church was listed on the National Register of Historic Places in 2006.

== See also ==
- National Register of Historic Places listings in Ashley County, Arkansas
