= First Church of Christ, Scientist (Little Rock, Arkansas) =

Historic church in Arkansas, United States

- U.S. National Register of Historic Places
- U.S. Historic district – Contributing property
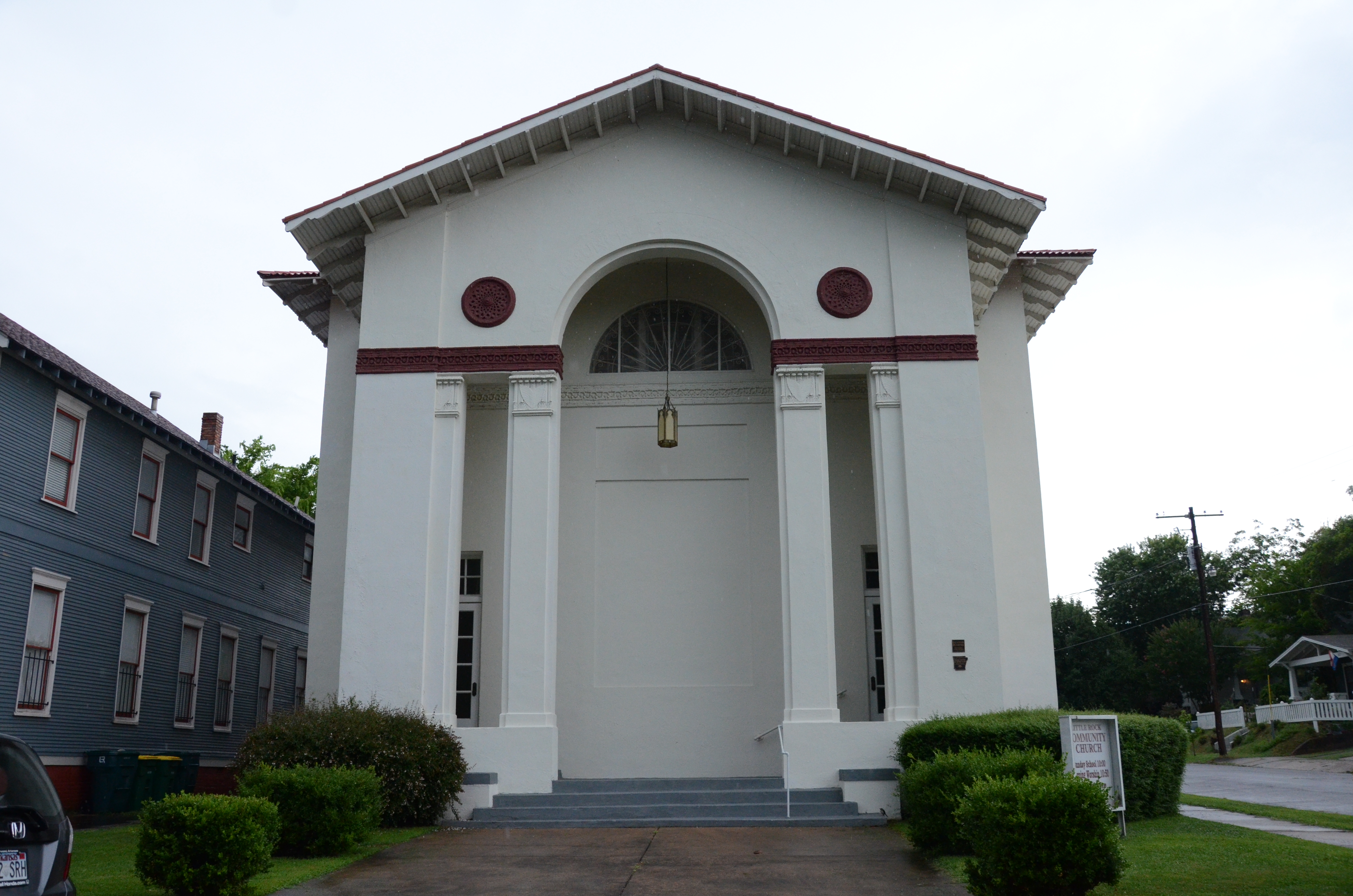

- Location within Arkansas Location within the United States
- Location: 2000 South Louisiana Str., 20th and Louisiana Sts., Little Rock, Arkansas
- Coordinates: 34°43′46″N 92°16′30″W
- Area: less than one acre
- Built: 1919
- Architect: John Parks Almand
- Architectural style: Mission/Spanish Revival
- Part of: Governor's Mansion Historic District (1988 enlargement) (ID88000631)
- NRHP reference No.: 84000008

Significant dates
- Added to NRHP: October 4, 1984
- Designated CP: May 19, 1988

The former First Church of Christ, Scientist, now the Little Rock Community Church, is a historic church building at 2000 South Louisiana Street in Little Rock, Arkansas. It is a single-story Mission style building, designed by noted Arkansas architect John Parks Almand and completed in 1919. Characteristics of the Mission style include the low-pitch tile hip roof, overhanging eaves with exposed rafter ends, and smooth plaster walls. The building also has modest Classical features, found in pilaster capitals and medallions of plaster and terra cotta. The building is local significant for its architecture. It was built for the local Christian Science congregation, which in 1950 sold it to an Evangelical Methodist congregation. That congregation has since severed its association with the Evangelical Methodist movement, and is now known as the Little Rock Community Church.

The building was listed on the National Register of Historic Places in 1984, and was included in a 1988 expansion of the Governor's Mansion Historic District.

== See also ==
- National Register of Historic Places in Little Rock, Arkansas
- List of former Christian Science churches, societies and buildings
- First Church of Christ, Scientist (disambiguation)
