= Home Ice Company =

- Formerly listed on the U.S. National Register of Historic Places
- Location within Arkansas Location within the United States
- Location: 700 Cate Ave., Jonesboro, Arkansas
- Coordinates: 35°50′31″N 90°41′54″W
- Area: less than one acre
- Built: 1907
- Architectural style: Mission/Spanish Colonial Revival
- NRHP reference No.: 100001005

Significant dates
- Added to NRHP: June 5, 2017
- Removed from NRHP: September 1, 2022

The Home Ice Company was a historic industrial building at 700 Cate Avenue in Jonesboro, Arkansas. A two-story wood-frame building was erected here in 1907 to house a wagon factory, which in 1920 was enlarged with a Mission Revival facade designed by Henry Lesmeister. From 1929 until 2013 the building was used to house an ice-making operation, and was a rare surviving example of an early ice manufactory.

The building was listed on the National Register of Historic Places in 2017.

The Home Ice Company name began being used again in 2019 by a craft ice company in Houston, Texas.

The Home Ice Company building was demolished in early 2021 after being condemned by the city due to environmental concerns. It was delisted from the National Register in 2022.

== See also ==
- National Register of Historic Places listings in Craighead County, Arkansas
