= Jonesboro U.S. Post Office and Courthouse =

- U.S. National Register of Historic Places
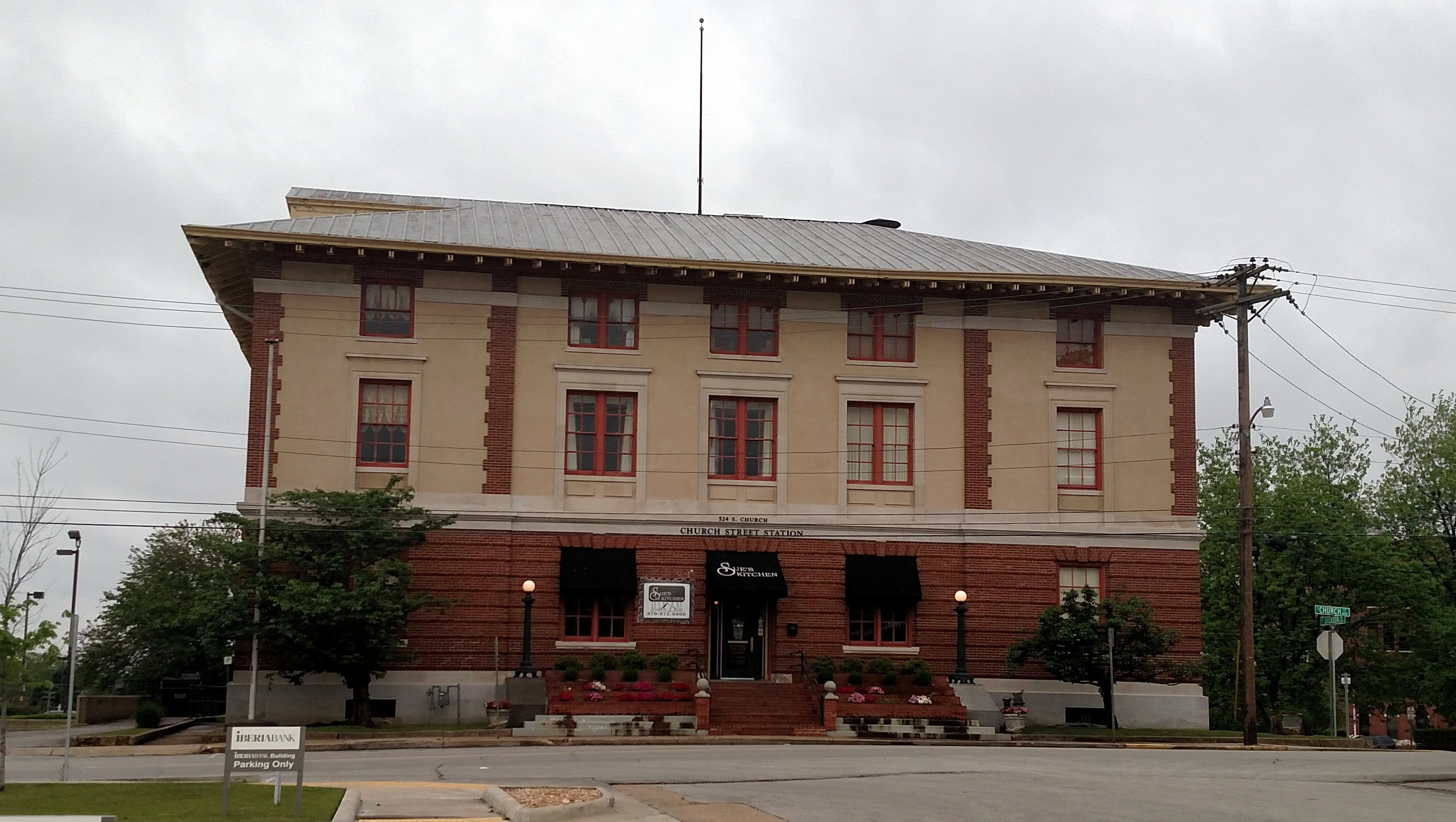

- Location within Arkansas Location within the United States
- Location: 524 S. Church St., Jonesboro, Arkansas
- Coordinates: 35°50′16″N 90°42′15″W
- Area: less than one acre
- Built: 1911
- Architect: James Knox Taylor
- Architectural style: Renaissance Revival
- NRHP reference No.: 100003987
- Added to NRHP: May 29, 2019

The Jonesboro U.S. Post Office and Courthouse is a former federal building located at 524 South Church Street, in downtown Jonesboro, Arkansas. It is a three-story masonry structure, built out of brick and limestone. The ground floor is visually presented as a basement level clad in red brick, while the upper levels are finished in stucco with brick trim. Although the building lacks rounded-arch openings normally found in the Renaissance Revival, it is laid out along lines typical of that style, with the courtrooms on the second floor in the piano nobile style. The building was built as a courthouse and post office in 1911–13 to a design by James Knox Taylor, the Supervising Architect of the United States Treasury. It was used as a federal courthouse until 1977, and has seen a variety of commercial uses since then.

The courthouse was listed on the National Register of Historic Places for its architecture in 2019.

== See also ==
- National Register of Historic Places listings in Craighead County, Arkansas
