= C.A. Stuck and Sons Lumber =

- Formerly listed on the U.S. National Register of Historic Places
- Location within Arkansas Location within the United States
- Location: 215 Union St., Jonesboro, Arkansas
- Coordinates: 35°50′29″N 90°42′21″W
- Area: 1 acre (0.40 ha)
- Built: 1889
- Built by: Stuck Family
- Architectural style: Early Commercial
- NRHP reference No.: 100002450, 02001597

Significant dates
- Added to NRHP: December 27, 2002; May 18, 2018
- Removed from NRHP: September 19, 2019

The C.A. Stuck and Sons Lumber Mill is a historic industrial complex at 215 Union Street in Jonesboro, Arkansas. It consists of four buildings: an office building, a lumber mill, and two storage sheds. All four buildings are brick structures built c. 1890, although the office building was enlarged and given a new facade in 1905. The Stuck mill, which was established in 1889, is one of the oldest properties associated with the early efforts to deforest Craighead County. C.A. Stuck was an Illinois-based furniture builder who moved to Jonesboro to facilitate the production of lumber for his products.

The complex was originally listed on the National Register of Historic Places in 2002. In 2018 it was simultaneously delisted and relisted. It was again delisted in 2019.

== See also ==
- National Register of Historic Places listings in Craighead County, Arkansas
