= John Parks Almand =

American architect (1885–1969)

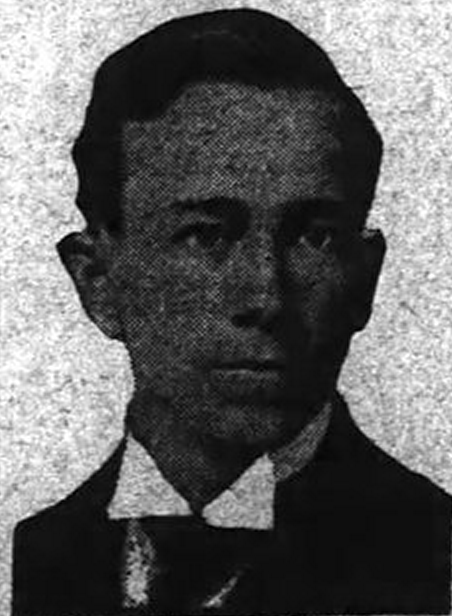
- John Parks Almand, c. 1911
- Born: May 8, 1885; Lithonia, Georgia
- Died: March 24, 1969 (aged 83); Little Rock, Arkansas
- Occupation: Architect
- Buildings: Little Rock Central High School; Hot Springs Medical Arts Building

John Parks Almand (May 8, 1885 – March 24, 1969) was an American architect who practiced in Arkansas from 1912 to 1962. Among other works, he designed the Art Deco Hot Springs Medical Arts Building, which was the tallest building in Arkansas from 1930 to 1958. Several of his works, including the Medical Arts Building and Little Rock Central High School, are listed on the National Register of Historic Places.

== Biography ==
He was born in Lithonia, Georgia. He received a bachelor of science degree from Emory College in 1907 and subsequently received a bachelor of architecture degree from Columbia University in 1911. He then worked as the head of the architecture department for a large engineering company in Cuba for one year. In 1912, he moved to Arkansas to work for the firm of Charles L. Thompson. He formed his own firm in 1914. He suffered a stroke in 1962 and died in 1969.

From 1928 to 1931 he worked in partnership with Elmer A. Stuck, the firm being known as Almand & Stuck.

== Works ==
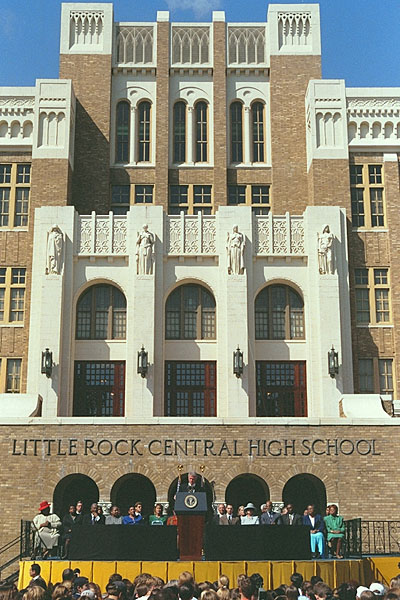
Little Rock Central High School

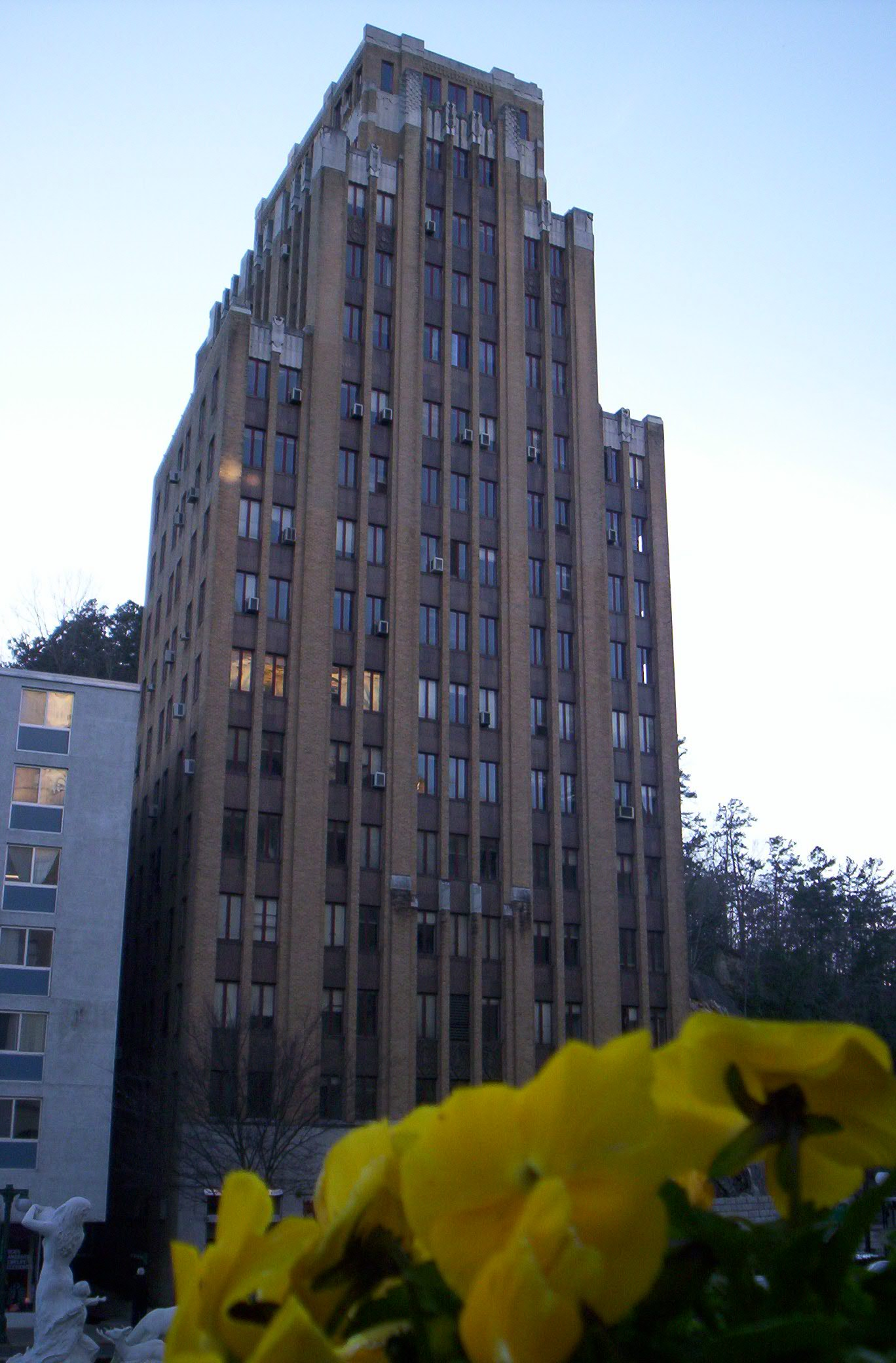
Medical Arts Building

A number of his works are listed on the National Register of Historic Places. His works include (with attribution as in sources):

- Almand House (c. 1922), 324 West Daisy Bates Drive, Little Rock, Arkansas (Almand, John Parks)
- Block Realty-Baker House, 1900 Beechwood, Little Rock, Arkansas (Almand, John Parks), NRHP-listed
- Couchwood, main lodge (built in rustic style with red cedar logs from Oregon), 601 Couchwood Road, Hot Springs, Arkansas (Almand, John Parks), part of the NRHP-listed Couchwood Historic District
- Crossett Methodist Church, 500 Main Street, Crossett, Arkansas (Almand, John Parks), NRHP-listed
- First Church of Christ, Scientist, 20th and Louisiana Streets, Little Rock, Arkansas (Almand, John Parks), NRHP-listed
- First Presbyterian Church (Little Rock), 123 E. Eighth Street, Little Rock, Arkansas (Almand, John Parks), NRHP-listed
- First Presbyterian Church (Lonoke), 304 South Center Street, Lonoke, Arkansas (Almand, John Parks), NRHP-listed
- First United Methodist Church, East 4th and Spring Streets, Fordyce, Arkansas (Almand, John Parks), NRHP-listed
- Land's End Plantation, 1 Land's End Lane, Scott, Arkansas (Almand, John Parks), NRHP-listed
- Lane Hotel, 121 West Poplar Street, Rogers, Arkansas (Almand, John Parks), NRHP-listed
- Little Rock Central High School, 14th and Park Streets, Little Rock, Arkansas (Almand, Delony, Mann, Stern & Wittenbrg), NRHP-listed
- Medical Arts Building (1930), now known as the Central Tower, 236 Central Avenue, Hot Springs, Arkansas (Almand & Stuck), NRHP-listed
- Bentonville High School, 410 Northwest Second Street, Bentonville, Arkansas (Almand, John Park), NRHP-listed
- U. M. Rose School (1916), now known as the James Monroe Cox Administration Building, 900 West Daisy Bates Drive, Little Rock, Arkansas (Almand, John Parks), part of the NRHP-listed Philander Smith College Historic District
- Portland United Methodist Church, 300 North Main Street, Portland, Arkansas (Almand, John Parks), NRHP-listed
