= First National Bank Building (Monette, Arkansas) =

- U.S. National Register of Historic Places
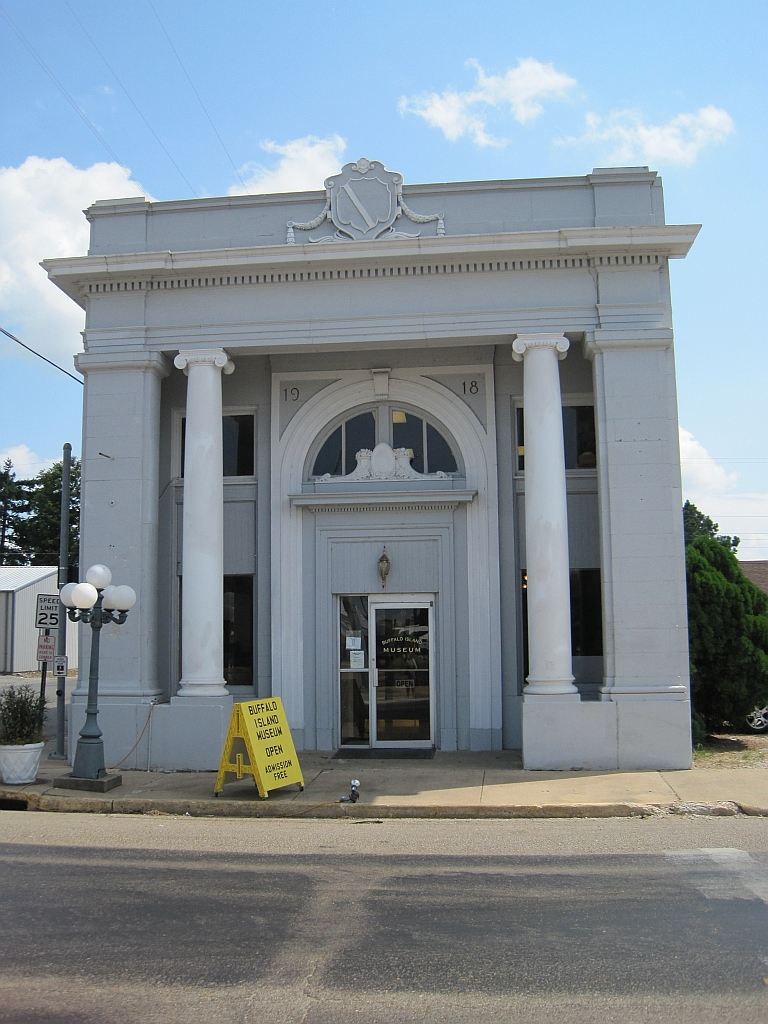

- Location within Arkansas Location within the United States
- Location: 207 W. Drew Ave., Monette, Arkansas
- Coordinates: 35°53′31″N 90°20′34″W
- Area: less than one acre
- Built: 1918
- Architectural style: Classical Revival
- NRHP reference No.: 07001423
- Added to NRHP: January 24, 2008

The First National Bank Building is a historic bank building at 207 West Drew Avenue in the center of Monette, Arkansas. It is a two-story Classical Revival, built of load-bearing brick and sculptured stone in 1918, and is the most architecturally significant building in the small town. The main facade is distinguished by two large Doric columns, which frame a portico area sheltering the main entrance. The entrance, now a modern glass doorway, is framed by a molded square arch which supports a dentillated entablature. This assembly is itself framed by a more monumental round-arched molding with keystone.

The building was listed on the National Register of Historic Places in 2008.

== See also ==
- National Register of Historic Places listings in Craighead County, Arkansas
