= Jacob Trieber Federal Building, United States Post Office, and United States Court House =

- Federal Building-United States Post Office and Court House
- U.S. National Register of Historic Places
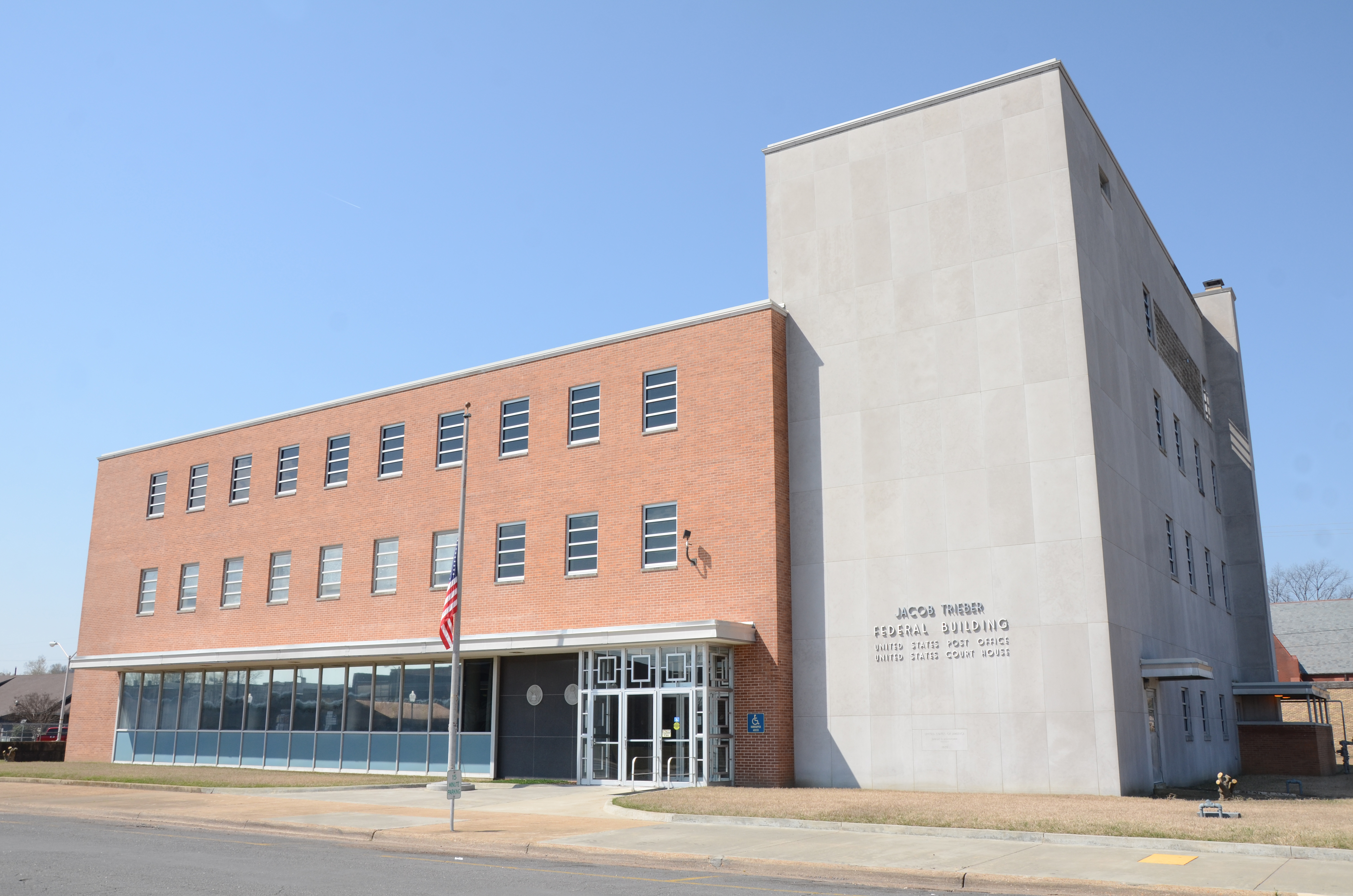

- Location within Arkansas Location within the United States
- Location: 617 Walnut St., Helena, Arkansas
- Coordinates: 34°31′43″N 90°35′15″W
- Built: 1961
- Architect: Edward F. Brueggeman, Elmer A. Stuck & Associates
- Architectural style: International Style
- NRHP reference No.: 15000204
- Added to NRHP: May 5, 2015

The Jacob Trieber Federal Building, United States Post Office, and United States Court House is a historic government building in Helena-West Helena, Arkansas. It is a Modern International style three-story building, its exterior finished in brick with limestone and granite trim. It was designed by Edward F. Brueggeman and Elmer A. Stuck & Associates, and built between 1959 and 1961. It is one of the city's few International style buildings, and has been relatively little altered since its construction.

The building was listed on the National Register of Historic Places as the Federal Building-United States Post Office and Court House in 2015. In 2016, it was renamed for Jacob Trieber, a judge for the Eastern District of Arkansas.

== See also ==
- National Register of Historic Places listings in Phillips County, Arkansas
