= Community Center No. 1 =

- Community Center #1
- U.S. National Register of Historic Places
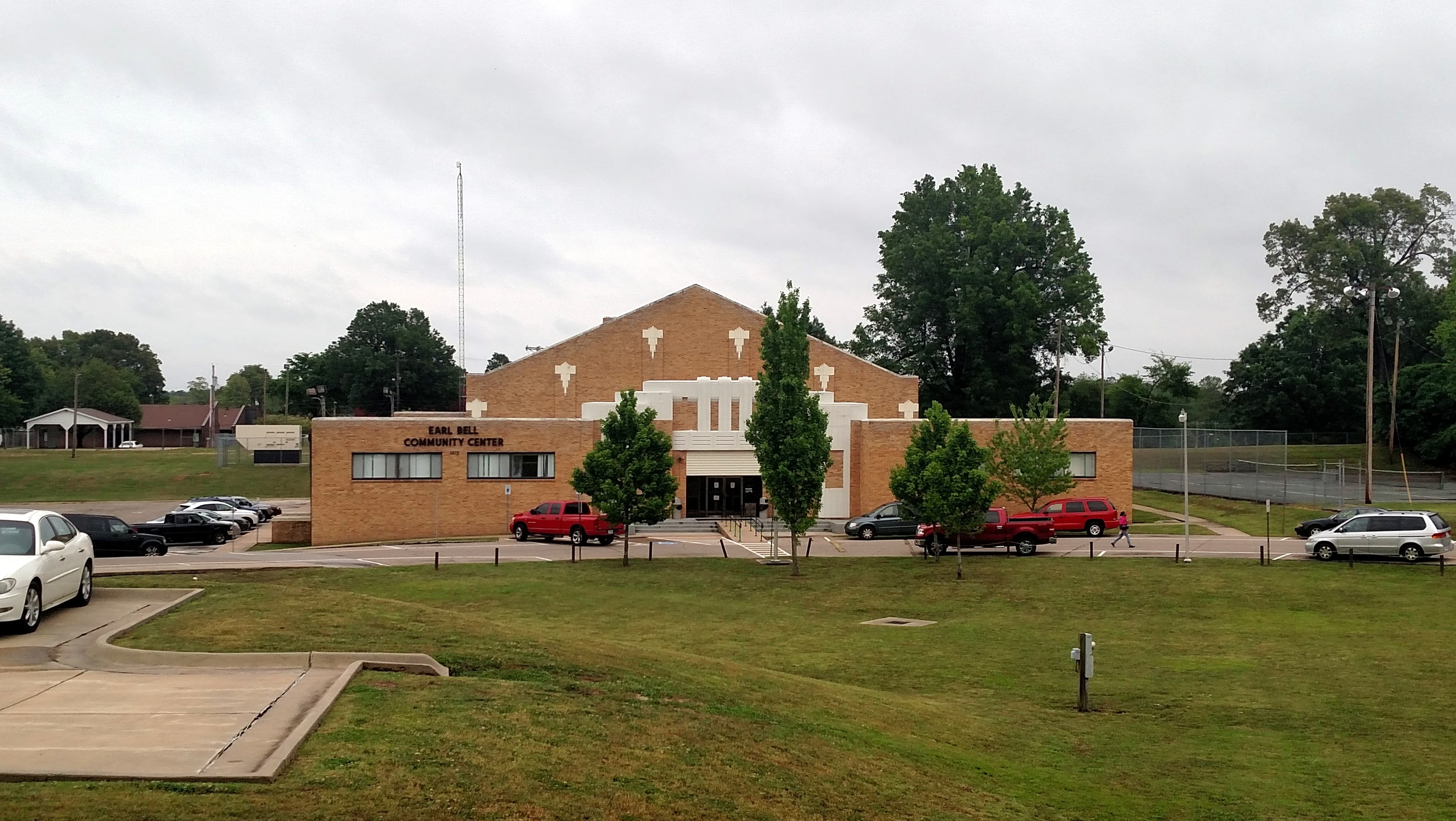

- Location within Arkansas Location within the United States
- Location: 1212 S. Church Street; Jonesboro, Arkansas
- Coordinates: 35°50′0″N 90°42′10″W
- Area: less than one acre
- Built: 1936
- Architect: Elmer A. Stuck
- Architectural style: Art Deco
- MPS: New Deal Recovery Efforts in Arkansas MPS
- NRHP reference No.: 07001422
- Added to NRHP: January 23, 2008

The Community Center No. 1 is a historic government building at 1212 South Church Street in Jonesboro, Arkansas, USA. It is a single-story building, faced in buff brick, with a stylish Art Deco entrance area consisting of towers and projections made of smooth white concrete. The entrance is flanked by large flat-roof sections which house recreational facilities, while the center section has a low-pitch gable roof. The community center was designed by Elmer A. Stuck, and built in 1936 with funding from the Public Works Administration. The center has undergone several name changes, and is now known as the Earl Bell Community Center, after the Olympic pole vaulter and Jonesboro native.

The building was listed on the National Register of Historic Places in 2008.

== See also ==
- National Register of Historic Places listings in Craighead County, Arkansas
