= First Presbyterian Church (Lonoke, Arkansas) =

Historic church in Arkansas, United States

- U.S. National Register of Historic Places
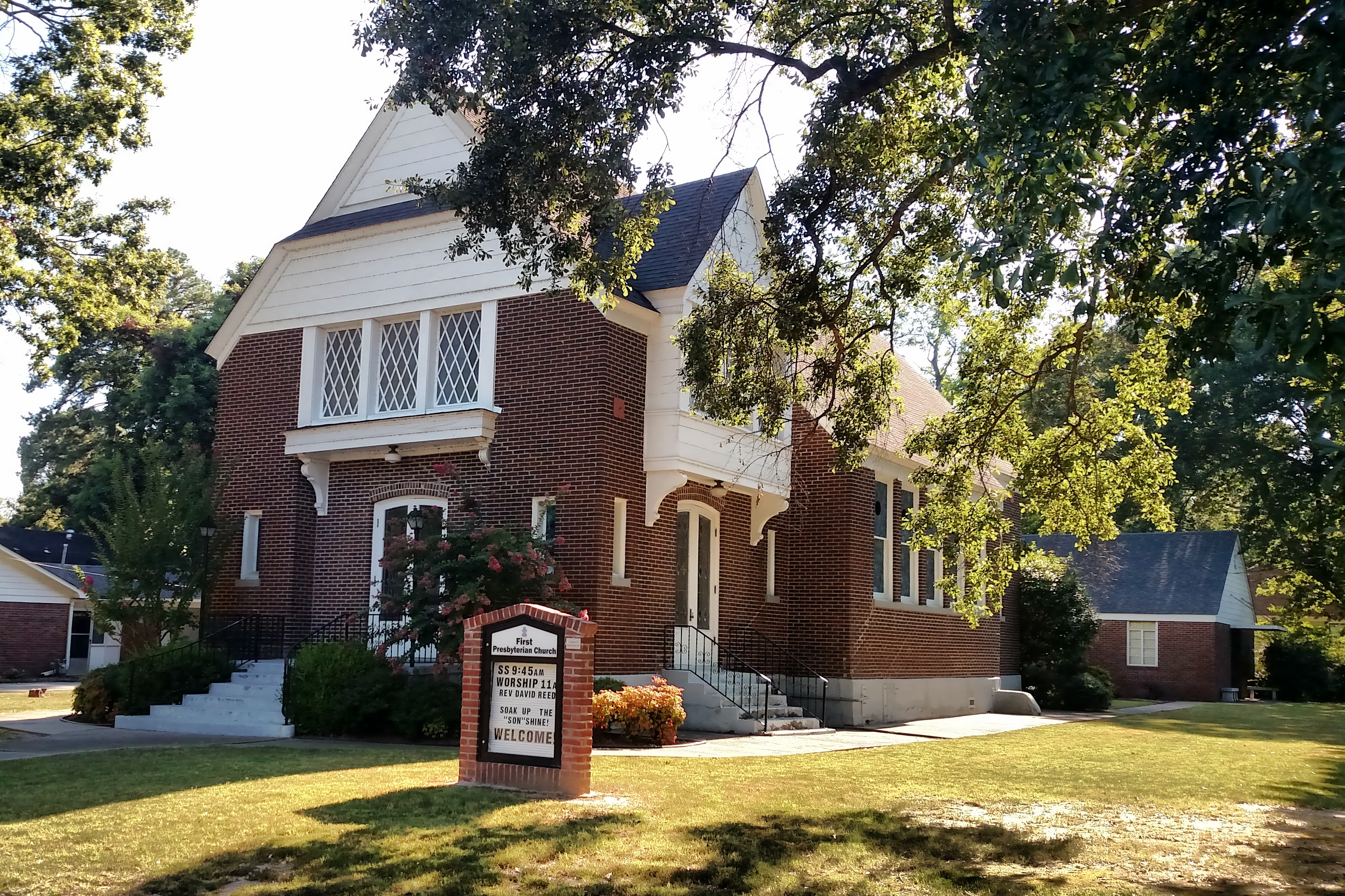

- Location within Arkansas Location within the United States
- Location: 304 S. Center St., Lonoke, Arkansas
- Coordinates: 34°46′53″N 91°54′1″W
- Area: less than one acre
- Built: 1919
- Architect: Almand, John Parks
- Architectural style: Tudor Revival
- NRHP reference No.: 04001037
- Added to NRHP: September 23, 2004

The First Presbyterian Church is a historic church at 304 S. Center St. in downtown Lonoke, Arkansas. It is a single-story brick building, with a gabled roof and concrete foundation. The brick is laid in running bond, and the gable ends are clad in shingles, but were originally finished in half-timbered stucco, in the Tudor Revival style. The church was built in 1919 to a design by architect John Parks Almand, and is the city's best example of ecclesiastical Tudor Revival architecture.

The building was listed on the National Register of Historic Places in 2004.

== See also ==
- National Register of Historic Places listings in Lonoke County, Arkansas
