= First Presbyterian Church (Little Rock, Arkansas) =

Historic church in Arkansas, United States

- U.S. National Register of Historic Places
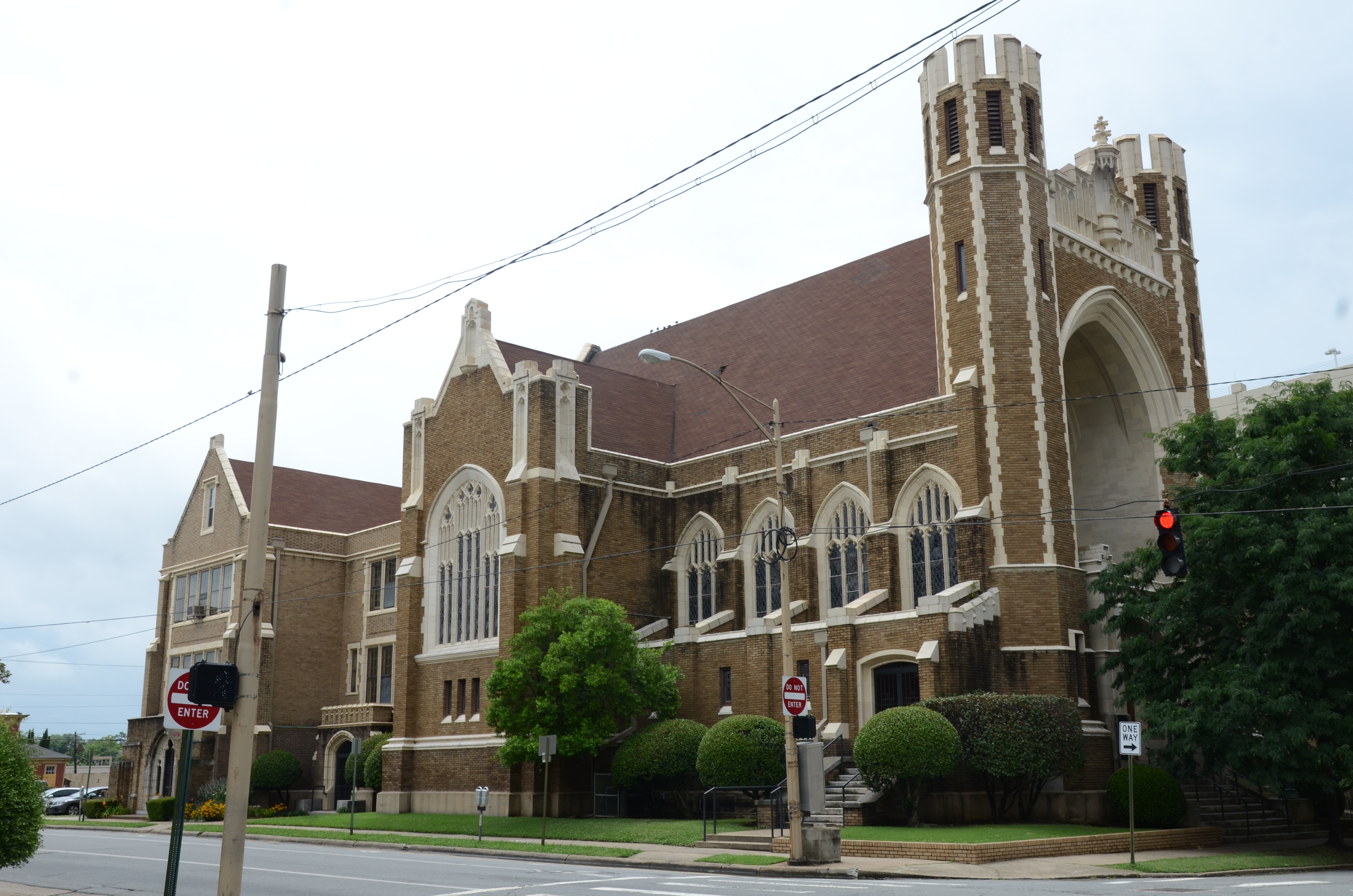

- Location within Arkansas Location within the United States
- Location: 123 E. Eighth St., Little Rock, Arkansas
- Coordinates: 34°44′26″N 92°16′15″W
- Area: less than one acre
- Built: 1921
- Architect: John Parks Almand, Charles L. Thompson
- Architectural style: Late 19th and 20th Century Revivals, English Gothic
- MPS: Little Rock Main Street MRA
- NRHP reference No.: 86003124
- Added to NRHP: November 13, 1986

The First Presbyterian Church is a historic church in Little Rock, Arkansas. It was designed by architect John Parks Almand and was built in 1921. It is a high quality local interpretation of the Gothic Revival style. It was listed on the National Register of Historic Places in 1986.

John Parks Almand had worked in the firm of Charles L. Thompson prior to this design commission. It was done for a congregation established in 1828, the oldest Presbyterian congregation in the state.

== See also ==
- National Register of Historic Places listings in Little Rock, Arkansas
