= Craighead County Road 513C Bridge =

- U.S. National Register of Historic Places
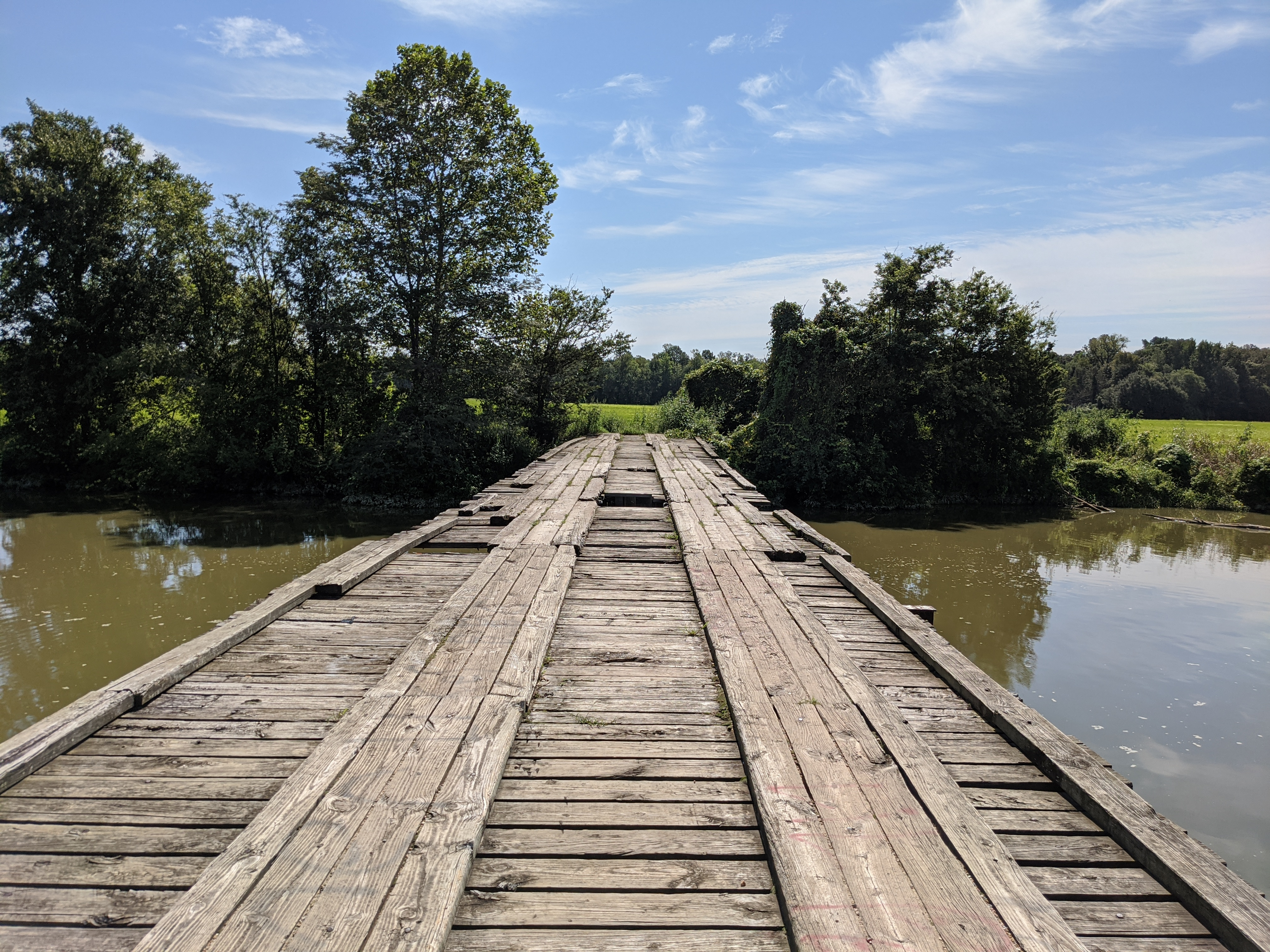

- Location within Arkansas Location within the United States
- Nearest city: Dixie, Arkansas
- Coordinates: 35°55′12″N 90°25′23″W
- Area: less than one acre
- Built: 1942
- Architectural style: Steel Deck Truss
- MPS: Historic Bridges of Arkansas MPS
- NRHP reference No.: 95000614
- Added to NRHP: May 18, 1995

The Craighead County Road 513C Bridge is a historic bridge in rural northeastern Craighead County, Arkansas. It carries County Road 513C, a short stub leading east from the junction of County Roads 513 and 998, across an unnamed ditch. It is a steel deck truss bridge whose main span 76 feet (23 m) long, mounted on wooden piers. Combined with its approaches, the bridge is 142 feet (43 m) long. Its deck is made of timber overlaying steel. The bridge is a World War II-era structure, built in 1942. The bridge's deck is 14.7 feet wide, while its overall width is 15.9 feet.

The bridge was listed on the National Register of Historic Places in 1995.

== See also ==
- National Register of Historic Places listings in Craighead County, Arkansas
- List of bridges on the National Register of Historic Places in Arkansas
