= Bay Mounds =

Archaeological site in Arkansas, United States

- U.S. National Register of Historic Places
- Nearest city: Bay, Arkansas
- Area: 5 acres (2.0 ha)
- NRHP reference No.: 78000582
- Added to NRHP: February 14, 1978

The Bay Mounds are an archaeological site near Bay, Arkansas. This collection of temple mounds are the only ones still surviving in Craighead County, the others having been levelled. They have been tentatively dated to 1200-1400 CE, but have not been excavated.

The mounds were listed on the National Register of Historic Places in 1978.

== See also ==
- National Register of Historic Places listings in Craighead County, Arkansas
