= First Methodist Church (Fordyce, Arkansas) =

Historic church in Arkansas, United States

- U.S. National Register of Historic Places
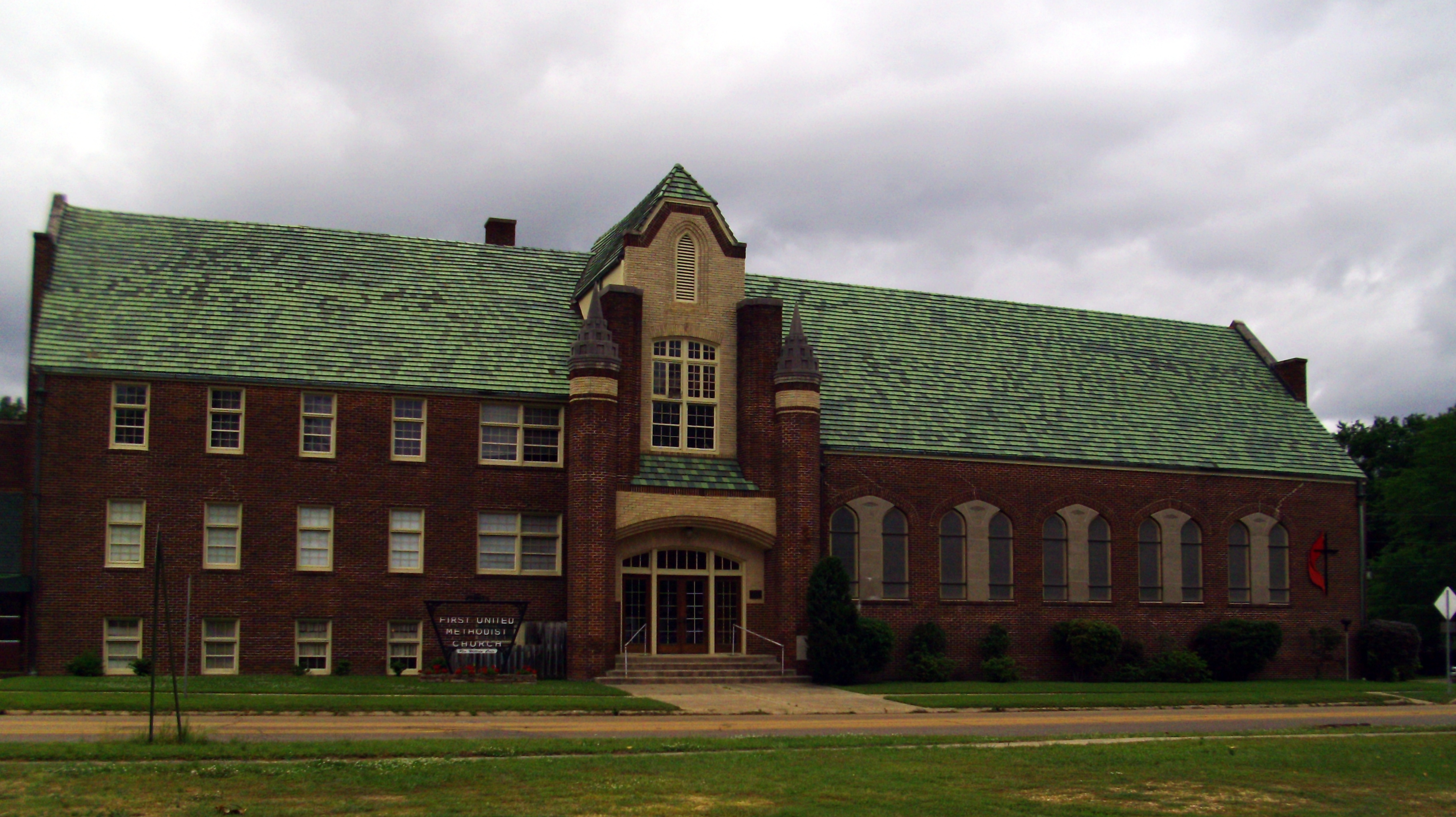

- Location within Arkansas Location within the United States
- Location: 104 E. 4th St., Fordyce, Arkansas
- Coordinates: 33°48′51″N 92°24′44″W
- Area: less than one acre
- Built: 1925
- Architect: John Parks Almand
- Architectural style: Bungalow/Craftsman, Arts & Crafts
- MPS: Dallas County MRA
- NRHP reference No.: 83003469
- Added to NRHP: October 28, 1983

The First Methodist Church, formerly known as First United Methodist Church, is a historic church building in Fordyce, Arkansas. The two story brick building was designed by John Parks Almand and built in 1925. The Arts and Crafts style building presents a long facade to East 4th Street, with its main entry separating the sanctuary to the right and a wing of offices and Sunday School classrooms to the left. It was the second church for a congregation established c. 1883; the first was destroyed by fire in 1922.

The building was listed on the National Register of Historic Places in 1983. In 2022, the congregation disaffiliated from the United Methodist Church and joined the Global Methodist Church.

== See also ==
- National Register of Historic Places listings in Dallas County, Arkansas
