= Nash-Reid-Hill House =

Historic house in Arkansas, United States

- U.S. National Register of Historic Places
- Location within Arkansas Location within the United States
- Location: 418 W. Matthews Ave., Jonesboro, Arkansas
- Coordinates: 35°50′9″N 90°42′31″W
- Area: less than one acre
- Built: 1934
- Architectural style: Queen Anne, Renaissance
- NRHP reference No.: 94000852
- Added to NRHP: August 16, 1994

The Nash-Reid-Hill House is a historic house at 418 West Matthews Avenue in Jonesboro, Arkansas. It is a 2 1/2-story wood-frame house, faced in brick veneer, with a hipped roof that has multiple cross gables and a three-story tower with a conical roof. The house was built between 1898 and 1902, using locally fired brick, and is a locally notable example of Queen Anne architecture, although its porch was modified in 1934 to give it a more French Eclectic appearance. It is also notable for its association with the locally prominent Nash family, who have long been prominent businessmen and landowners in the years since the American Civil War.

The house was listed on the National Register of Historic Places in 1994.

== See also ==
- National Register of Historic Places listings in Craighead County, Arkansas
