= Lane Hotel =

- U.S. National Register of Historic Places
- U.S. Historic district – Contributing property
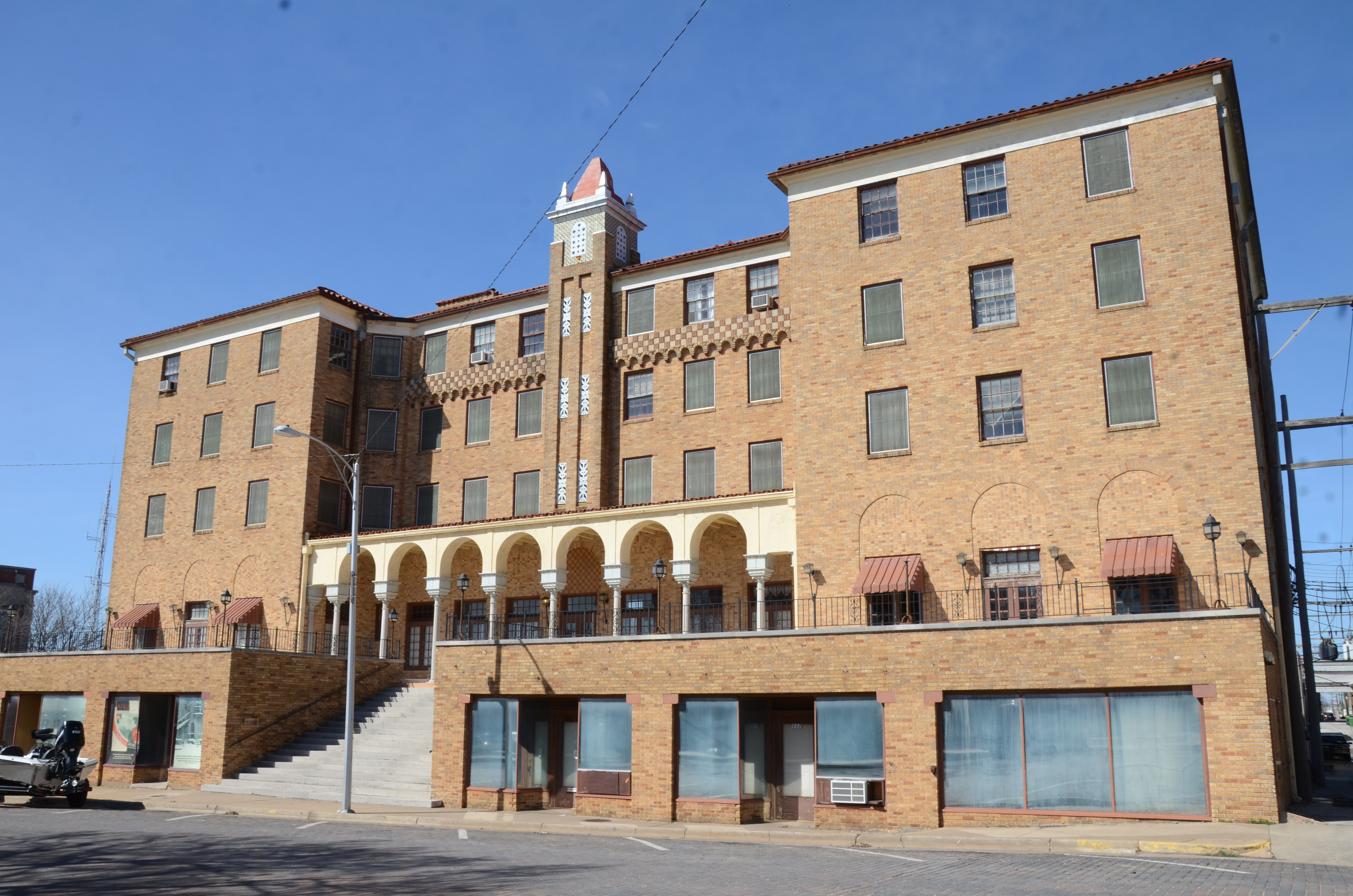

- Location within Arkansas Location within the United States
- Location: 121 W Poplar St, Rogers, Arkansas
- Coordinates: 36°19′52″N 94°7′2″W
- Built: 1929
- Architect: John Parks Almand
- Architectural style: Spanish Colonial Revival
- Part of: Rogers Commercial Historic District (ID93001028)
- MPS: Benton County MRA
- NRHP reference No.: 87002411

Significant dates
- Added to NRHP: January 28, 1988
- Designated CP: September 30, 1993

The Lane Hotel is a historic former hotel building in Rogers, Arkansas, United States. It is a five-story yellow brick Spanish Revival building, designed by architect John Parks Almand and completed in 1929. It is the largest Spanish Revival building in Arkansas, with a prominent colonnade of arches at the second level, above a first floor series of commercial storefronts, and a central tower. The hotel was not successful, having been completed just at the outset of the Great Depression, and went through a succession of owners before closing in 1965. Beginning in 1999 it was a retirement community known as Peachtree on the Lane.

It was refurbished in 2017 and housed the Haas Hall Academy Rogers campus through spring 2024. It is the current home of the School for Advanced Studies - Northwest Arkansas.

The building was listed on the National Register of Historic Places in 1988.

== See also ==
- National Register of Historic Places listings in Benton County, Arkansas
