= West Washington Avenue Historic District =

Historic district in Arkansas, United States

- U.S. National Register of Historic Places
- U.S. Historic district
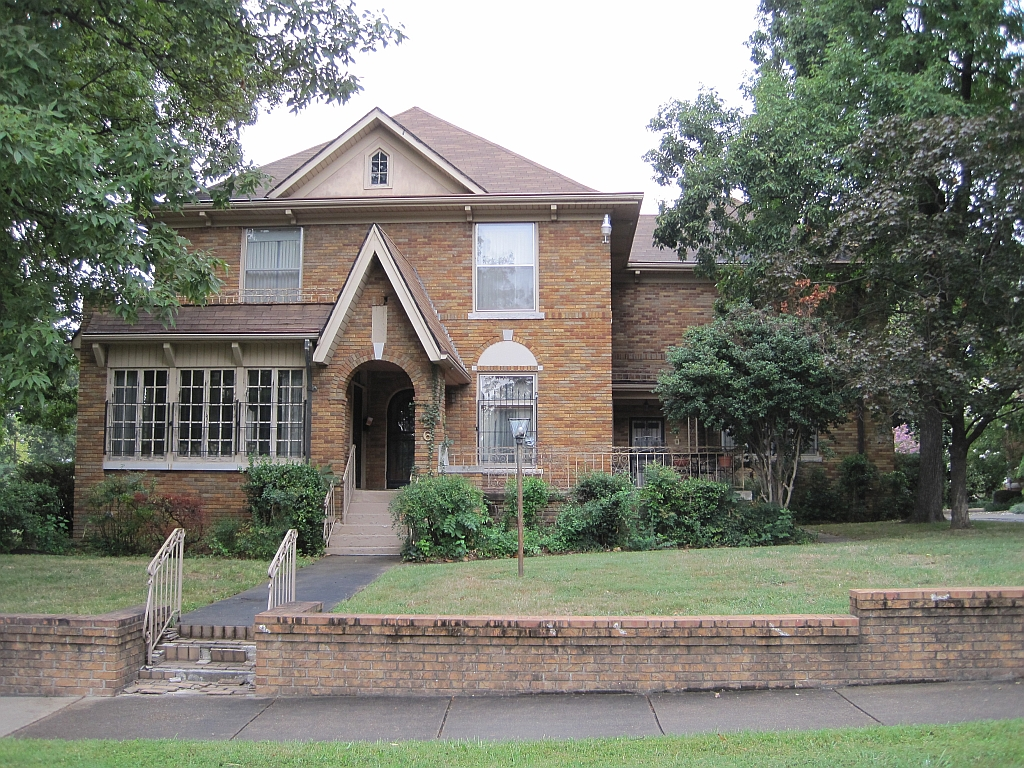

- Location within Arkansas Location within the United States
- Location: 500-626 W Washington Ave., Jonesboro, Arkansas
- Area: 6 acres (2.4 ha)
- Architect: German, Tom
- Architectural style: Late 19th And 20th Century Revivals, Late Victorian
- NRHP reference No.: 82000805
- Added to NRHP: October 22, 1982

The West Washington Avenue Historic District of Jonesboro, Arkansas, encompasses a concentrated grouping of residential buildings built between 1890 and 1930. It represents the best-preserved section of the city's first planned subdivision, including thirteen historic properties on a 1-1/2 block stretch of West Washington Avenue extending east from Mclure Street and beyond Flint Street. Stylistically these houses represent a cross-section of architecture popular in the period, including Queen Anne Victorians and Tudor Revival structures. Most of the houses are built of brick, and there is one church.

The district was listed on the National Register of Historic Places in 1982.

== See also ==
- National Register of Historic Places listings in Craighead County, Arkansas
