= Bell House (Jonesboro, Arkansas) =

Historic house in Arkansas, United States

- U.S. National Register of Historic Places
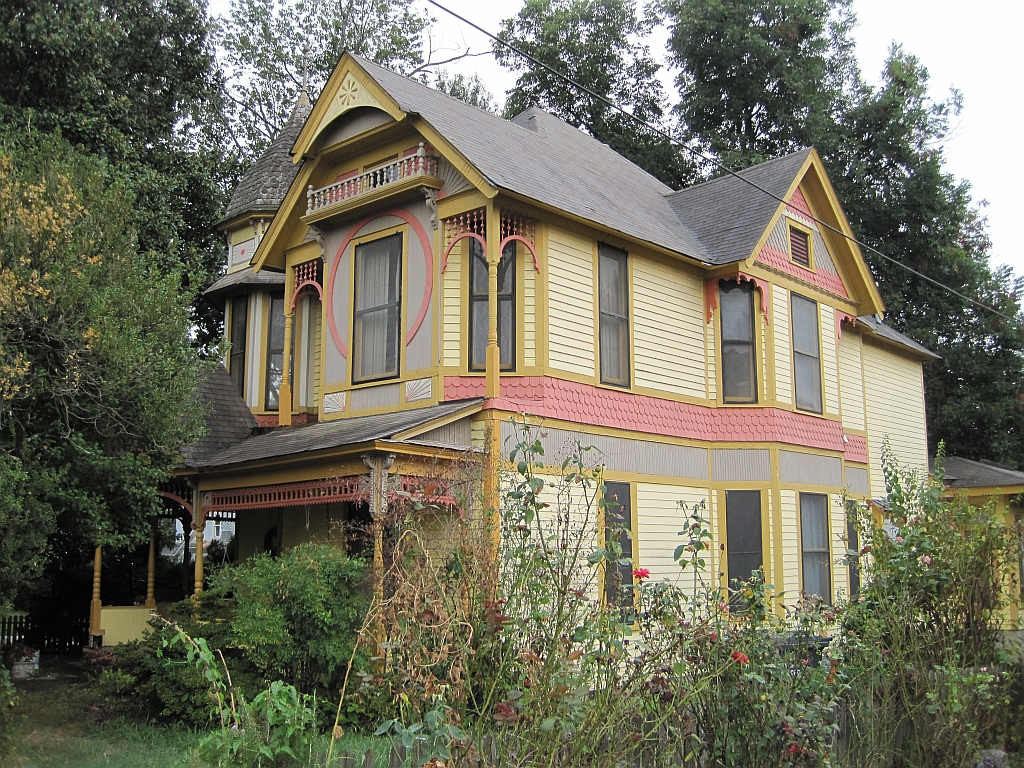

- Location within Arkansas Location within the United States
- Location: 303 W. Cherry St., Jonesboro, Arkansas
- Coordinates: 35°50′2″N 90°42′26″W
- Area: less than one acre
- Built: 1903
- Architectural style: Queen Anne
- NRHP reference No.: 76000398
- Added to NRHP: November 7, 1976

The Bell House is a historic house at 303 West Cherry Street in Jonesboro, Arkansas. It is a two-story wood-frame structure, built in 1895 by J. V. Bell, owner of one of Jonesboro's first bookstores. The house is an elaborately decorated Queen Anne Victorian, with an asymmetrical arrangement of projecting bays, gables, and porches. The front porch has a delicate spindle-work frieze, and is supported by turned columns. Different types of cut shingles give variety to the wall surfaces.

The house was listed on the National Register of Historic Places in 1976.

== See also ==
- National Register of Historic Places listings in Craighead County, Arkansas
