= Block Realty-Baker House =

Historic house in Arkansas, United States

- U.S. National Register of Historic Places
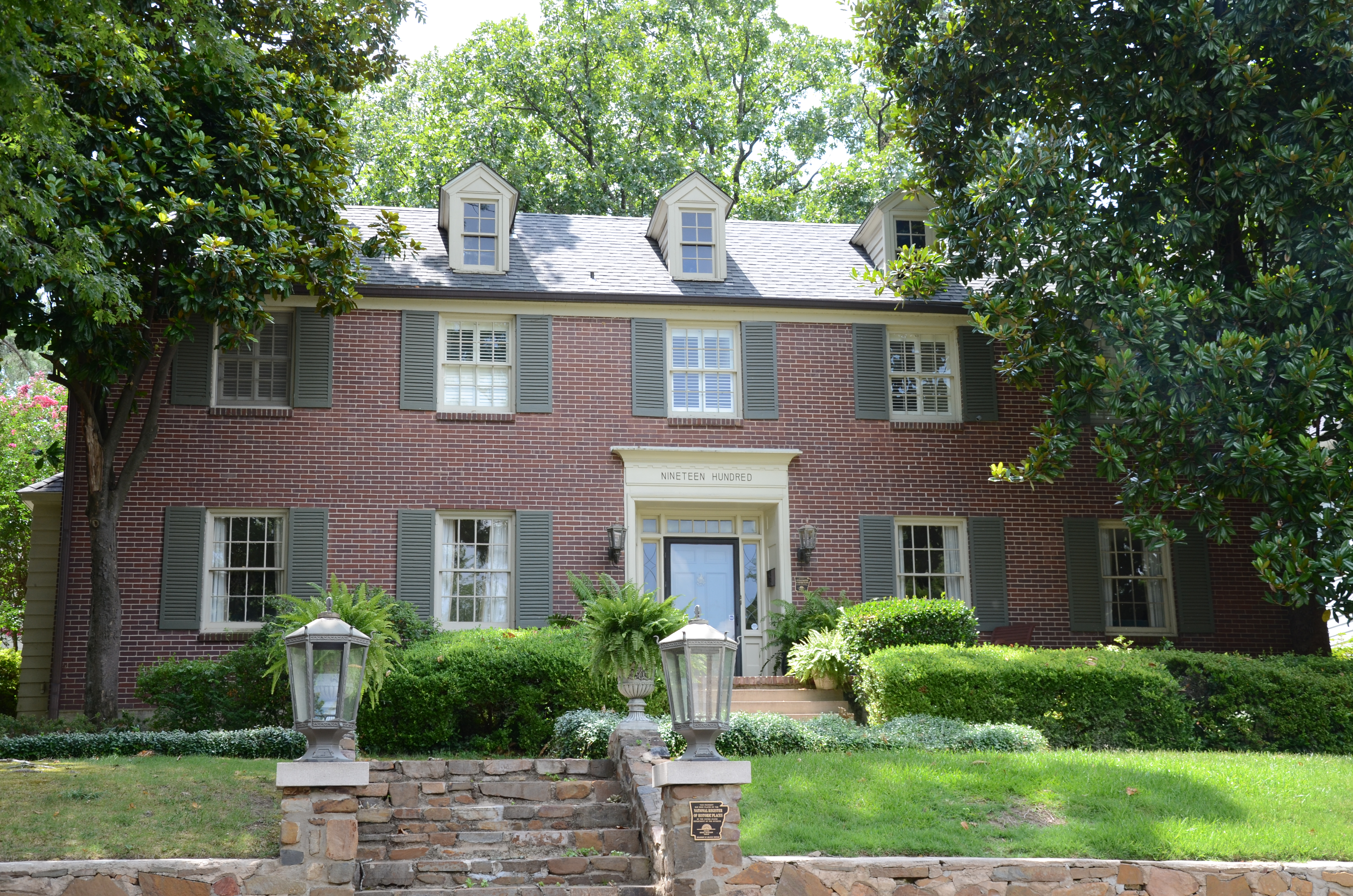

- Location within Arkansas Location within the United States
- Location: 1900 Beechwood, Little Rock, Arkansas
- Coordinates: 34°46′15″N 92°19′28″W
- Area: less than one acre
- Built: 1940
- Built by: Little Rock Builders
- Architect: John Parks Almand
- Architectural style: Colonial Revival
- NRHP reference No.: 08000935
- Added to NRHP: September 24, 2008

The Block Realty-Baker House is a historic house located at 1900 Beechwood in Little Rock, Arkansas.

== Description and history ==
It is a 2 1/2-story masonry structure, five bays wide, with a side gable roof. Wood-framed ells extend to the rear, which are finished in weatherboard. The front roof is pierced by four gabled dormers, and the entrance, set in at the center of the front facade, is recessed in an opening with flanking sidelight and transom windows. The opening is topped by an entablature with cornice. It was designed in Colonial Revival style by architect John Parks Almand and built about 1940 by the Block Realty Company.

The house was listed on the National Register of Historic Places on September 24, 2008.

== See also ==
- National Register of Historic Places listings in Little Rock, Arkansas
