= Medical Arts Building (Hot Springs, Arkansas) =

- U.S. National Register of Historic Places
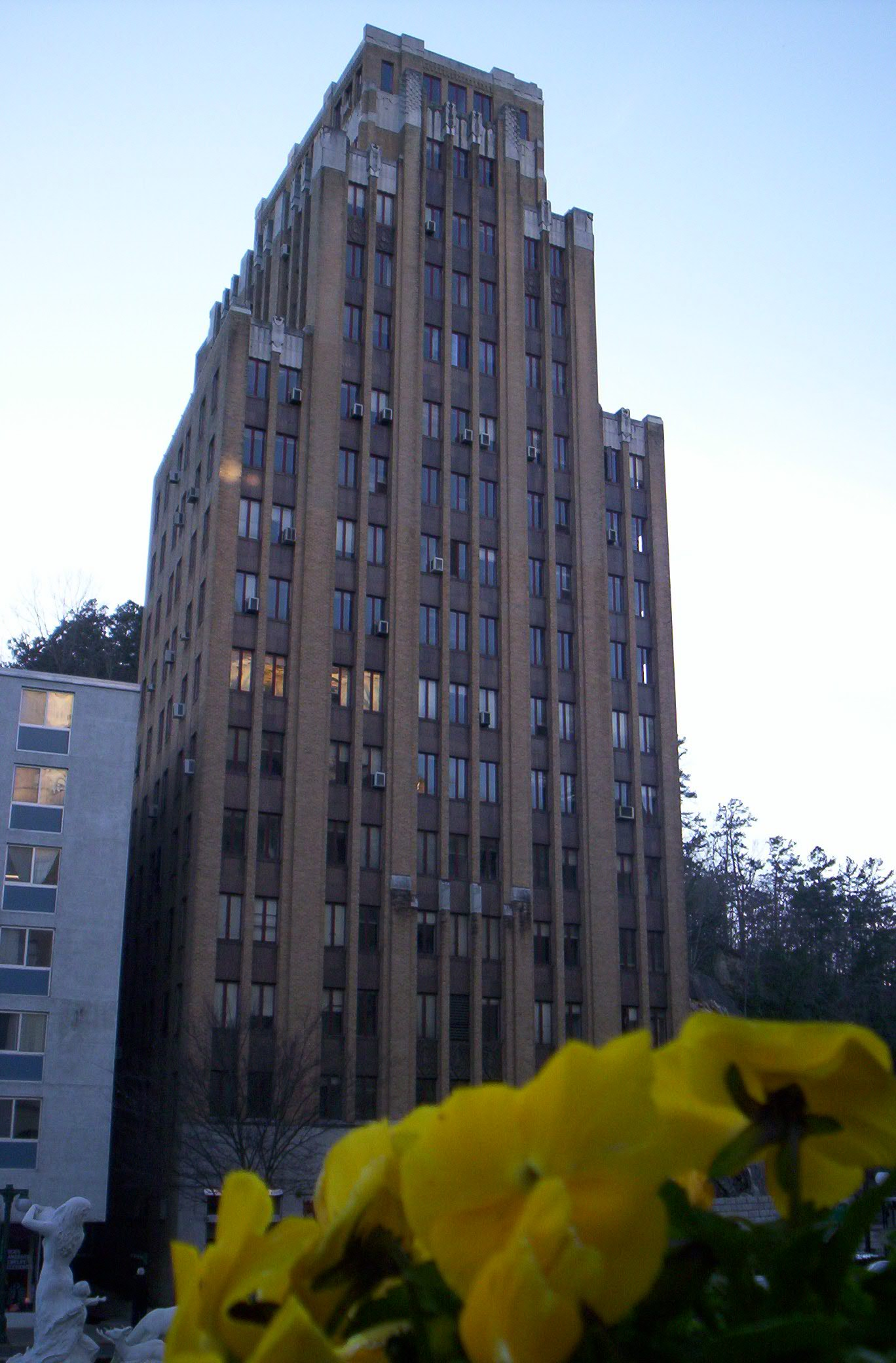

- Location within Arkansas Location within the United States
- Location: 236 Central Ave., Hot Springs, Arkansas
- Coordinates: 34°30′59″N 93°3′14″W
- Area: less than one acre
- Built: 1929
- Architect: Almand & Stuck
- Architectural style: Art Deco
- NRHP reference No.: 78000588
- Added to NRHP: November 30, 1978

The Medical Arts Building is a historic skyscraper at 236 Central Avenue in downtown Hot Springs, Arkansas. It is a 16-story structure with Art Deco styling, rising to a height of 180 feet (55 m). It was built in 1929 to a design by Almand & Stuck, and is the first skyscraper and was the tallest building in the state until 1960.

Its main entrance is framed by fluted pilasters, topped by floral panels and a stone frieze identifying the building.

The building was listed on the National Register of Historic Places in 1978. Since 1991, all but the first floor is closed to the public. In June 2012, it was declared endangered and it was said that did it will not be torn down. In May 2021, the first 15 floors of the building were purchased and are currently under renovation. The building is set to be transformed into Aloft Hotel.
