= National Register of Historic Places listings in Craighead County, Arkansas =

Location of Craighead County in Arkansas

This is a list of the National Register of Historic Places listings in Craighead County, Arkansas.

This is intended to be a complete list of the properties and districts on the National Register of Historic Places in Craighead County, Arkansas, United States. The locations of National Register properties and districts for which the latitude and longitude coordinates are included below, may be seen in a map.

There are 24 properties and districts listed on the National Register in the county, and two former listings. One of the two delisted properties was delisted and relisted under a different name, and then delisted again.

Contents: Counties in Arkansas
- Arkansas
- Ashley
- Baxter
- Benton
- Boone
- Bradley
- Calhoun
- Carroll
- Chicot
- Clark
- Clay
- Cleburne
- Cleveland
- Columbia
- Conway
- Craighead
- Crawford
- Crittenden
- Cross
- Dallas
- Desha
- Drew
- Faulkner
- Franklin
- Fulton
- Garland
- Grant
- Greene
- Hempstead
- Hot Spring
- Howard
- Independence
- Izard
- Jackson
- Jefferson
- Johnson
- Lafayette
- Lawrence
- Lee
- Lincoln
- Little River
- Logan
- Lonoke
- Madison
- Marion
- Miller
- Mississippi
- Monroe
- Montgomery
- Nevada
- Newton
- Ouachita
- Perry
- Phillips
- Pike
- Poinsett
- Polk
- Pope
- Prairie
- Pulaski (Little Rock)
- Randolph
- St. Francis
- Saline
- Scott
- Searcy
- Sebastian
- Sevier
- Sharp
- Stone
- Union
- Van Buren
- Washington
- White
- Woodruff
- Yell

This National Park Service list is complete through NPS recent listings posted December 19, 2025.

== Current listings ==
	Name on the Register	Image	Date listed	Location	City or town	Description
1	Arkansas State College Historic District		May 16, 2024 (#100010315)	2405 Aggie Road; 35°50′33″N 90°40′44″W	Jonesboro	
2	Bay Mounds		February 14, 1978 (#78000582)	Address Restricted	Bay	
3	Bell House	Bell House	November 7, 1976 (#76000398)	303 W. Cherry St. 35°50′02″N 90°42′26″W	Jonesboro	
4	Berger House	Berger House	November 7, 1996 (#96001272)	1120 S. Main St. 35°49′55″N 90°42′17″W	Jonesboro	
5	Berger-Graham House		October 10, 1985 (#85003006)	1327 S. Main St. 35°49′43″N 90°42′19″W	Jonesboro	
6	Bridge Street Bridge		September 10, 2020 (#100005580)	Bridge St. between Johnson and Cate Aves. 35°50′36″N 90°41′58″W	Jonesboro	
7	US Sen. Hattie Caraway Gravesite	US Sen. Hattie Caraway Gravesite	September 20, 2007 (#07000976)	Oaklawn Cemetery, 2349 W. Matthews Avenue Ln. 35°50′15″N 90°44′20″W	Jonesboro	Gravesite of Hattie Caraway, the first woman elected to a full term in the United States Senate.
8	Citizens Bank Building		September 15, 2020 (#100005581)	100 West Washington St. 35°50′18″N 90°42′19″W	Jonesboro	
9	Community Center No. 1	Community Center No. 1	January 23, 2008 (#07001422)	1212 S. Church St. 35°50′00″N 90°42′10″W	Jonesboro	
10	Craighead County Courthouse	Craighead County Courthouse	September 11, 1998 (#98000831)	511 Main St. 35°50′14″N 90°42′18″W	Jonesboro	
11	Craighead County Courthouse		March 19, 2025 (#78003480)	Court Sq. 35°49′13″N 90°26′40″W	Lake City	
12	Craighead County Road 513C Bridge	Craighead County Road 513C Bridge	May 18, 1995 (#95000614)	County Road 513C over an unnamed ditch, approximately 1.5 miles east of Dixie, just east of its junction with County Road 669; 35°55′12″N 90°25′23″W	Dixie	
13	First National Bank Building	First National Bank Building	January 24, 2008 (#07001423)	207 W. Drew Ave. 35°53′31″N 90°20′34″W	Monette	
14	Frierson House	Frierson House	April 24, 1973 (#73000381)	1112 S. Main St. 35°49′56″N 90°42′17″W	Jonesboro	
15	Fuller-Shannon House		September 14, 2020 (#100005582)	1408 Twin Oaks Ave. 35°49′00″N 90°43′31″W	Jonesboro	
16	Jonesboro U.S. Post Office and Courthouse	Jonesboro U.S. Post Office and Courthouse	May 29, 2019 (#100003987)	524 S. Church St. 35°50′16″N 90°42′15″W	Jonesboro	
17	Victor Cicero Kays House		May 23, 2014 (#14000246)	2506 Aggie Rd. 35°50′33″N 90°40′26″W	Jonesboro	
18	Mercantile Bank Building	Mercantile Bank Building	January 20, 2005 (#04001506)	249 S. Main St. 35°24′34″N 90°46′16″W	Jonesboro	
19	Monette Water Tower	Monette Water Tower	January 24, 2008 (#07001424)	Southwestern corner of the junction of Highway 139 and Texie Ave. 35°53′38″N 90°20′35″W	Monette	
20	Nash-Reid-Hill House		August 16, 1994 (#94000852)	418 W. Matthews Ave. 35°50′09″N 90°42′31″W	Jonesboro	
21	Patteson House		January 23, 2020 (#100004898)	2801 Harrisburg Rd. 35°48′42″N 90°41′55″W	Jonesboro	
22	St. Francis River Bridge	St. Francis River Bridge	April 9, 1990 (#90000515)	Highway 18 over the St. Francis River; 35°49′14″N 90°25′58″W	Lake City	Dismantled in 1998; only the vertical lift section remains
23	West Washington Avenue Historic District	West Washington Avenue Historic District	October 22, 1982 (#82000805)	500-626 W. Washington Ave. 35°50′13″N 90°42′39″W	Jonesboro	
24	Edward L. Westbrooke Building	Edward L. Westbrooke Building	January 8, 2003 (#02001675)	505 Union St. 35°50′16″N 90°42′21″W	Jonesboro	

== Former listings ==
	Name on the Register	Image	Date listed	Date removed	Location	City or town	Description
1	Home Ice Company		June 5, 2017 (#100001005)	September 1, 2022	700 Cate Ave. 35°50′32″N 90°41′54″W	Jonesboro	
2	C.S. Stuck & Sons Lumber Office Building		May 18, 2018 (#100002450)	September 30, 2019	215 Union St. 35°50′29″N 90°42′21″W	Jonesboro	Originally listed on December 27, 2002; delisted and relisted simultaneously on May 18, 2018 before being delisted again.

== See also ==
- List of National Historic Landmarks in Arkansas
- National Register of Historic Places listings in Arkansas
