= Berger-Graham House =

Historic house in Arkansas, United States

- U.S. National Register of Historic Places
- Location within Arkansas Location within the United States
- Location: 1327 S. Main St., Jonesboro, Arkansas
- Coordinates: 35°49′43″N 90°42′19″W
- Area: less than one acre
- Built: 1904
- Architectural style: Classical Revival, Romanesque, Richardsonian Romanesque
- NRHP reference No.: 85003006
- Added to NRHP: October 10, 1985

The Berger-Graham House is a historic house at 1327 South Main Street in Jonesboro, Arkansas. Situated on one of the highest points in the city, this is an imposing brick structure with Classical Revival and Richardsonian Romanesque characteristics. Its brick walls are eighteen inches think, supporting a hip roof with cross gables and dormers. The main entrance is recessed under a large round arch that is the focal point of the front elevation. The house was built in 1904 by Marcus Berger, a wealthy businessman, as a wedding present for his son Joseph. In 1909 it was purchased by W. H. Graham, a wholesale cotton broker. After financial reverses in the Great Depression, Graham converted the property into a boarding house.

The house was listed on the National Register of Historic Places in 1985.

== See also ==
- National Register of Historic Places listings in Craighead County, Arkansas
