= Berger House (Abilene, Kansas) =

Historic house in Kansas, United States

- U.S. National Register of Historic Places
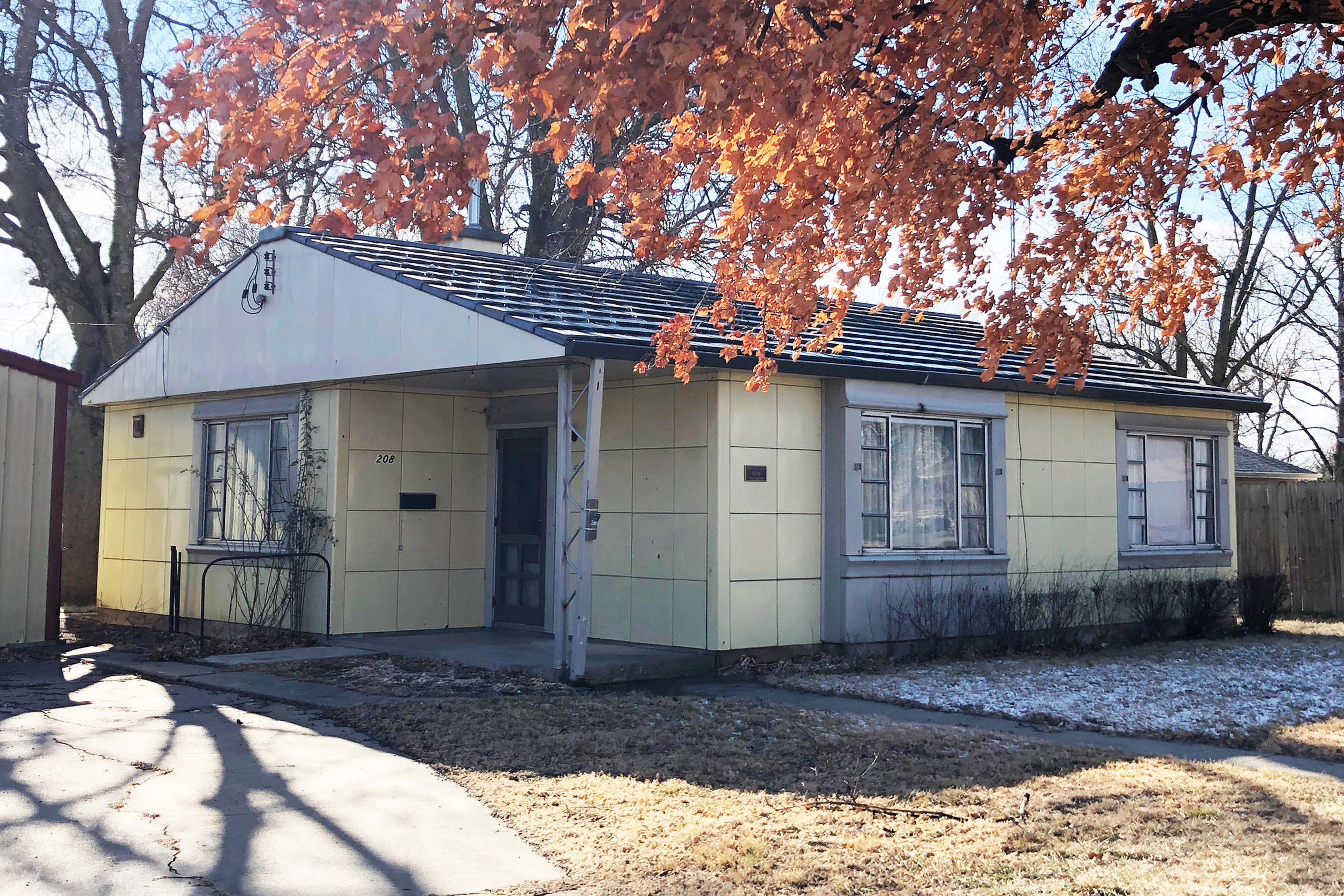

- Location within Kansas Location within the United States
- Location: 208 NE 12th St. Abilene, Kansas
- Coordinates: 38°55′37″N 97°12′40″W
- Built: 1949
- Architect: Morris H. Bechman; Lifetime Homes, Inc.
- Architectural style: Modern Movement
- MPS: Lustron Houses of Kansas MPS
- NRHP reference No.: 07000606
- Added to NRHP: June 27, 2007

Berger House in Abilene, Kansas is a Lustron house dating from 1949. It was deemed to be architecturally significant as it is one of fewer than 100 Lustron houses remaining in Kansas.

It was listed on the National Register of Historic Places in 2007.
