= Berger-Kiel House =

Historic house in Illinois, United States

- U.S. National Register of Historic Places
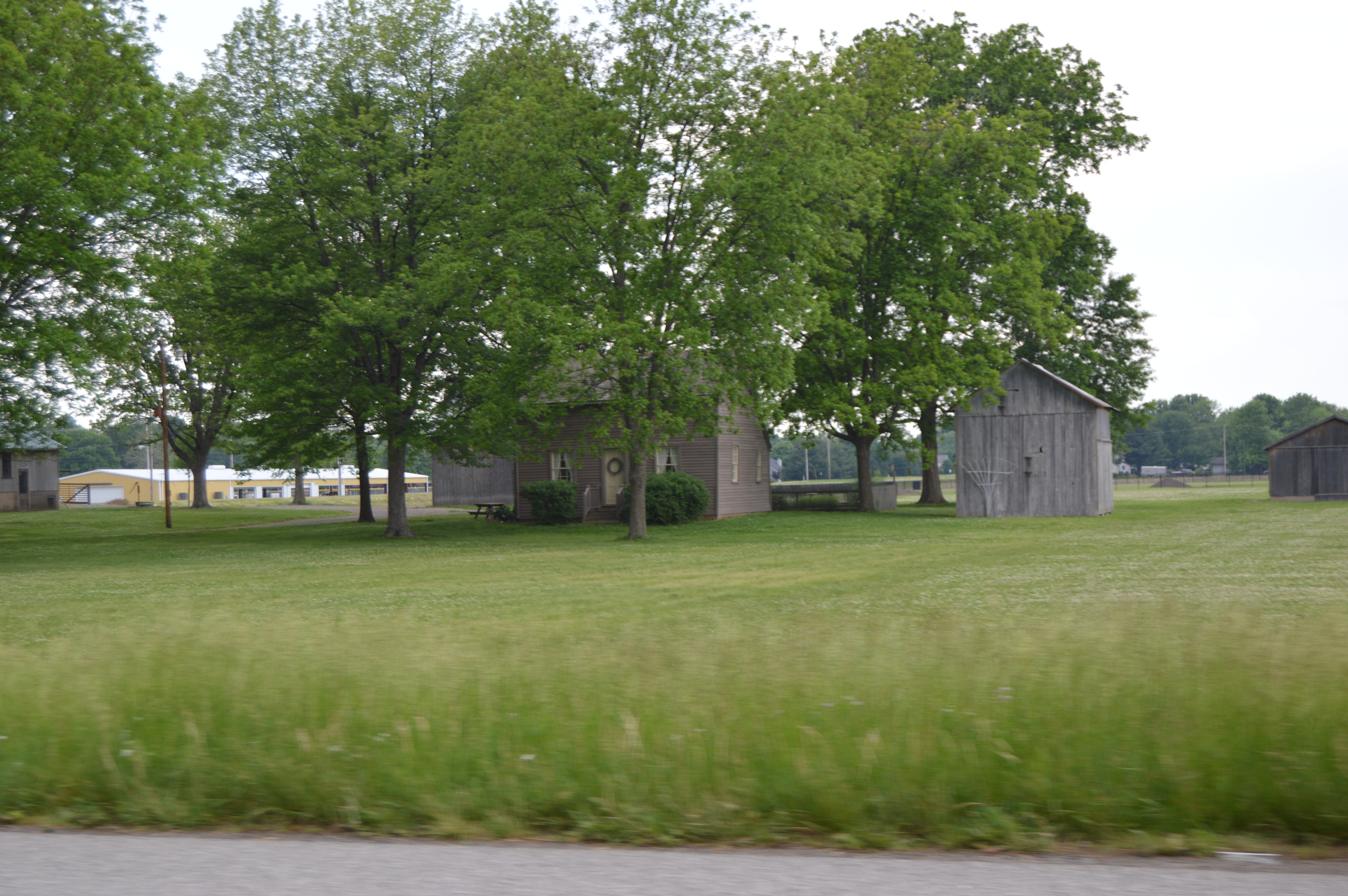
- Roadside view

- Location within Illinois Location within the United States
- Location: 931 N. 6th St., Mascoutah, Illinois
- Coordinates: 38°30′0″N 89°48′28″W
- Area: less than one acre
- Architectural style: Hall and parlor house
- NRHP reference No.: 99000977
- Added to NRHP: August 12, 1999

The Berger-Kiel House is a log house located at 931 N. 6th St. in Mascoutah, Illinois. The house was built circa 1863-64 for German immigrant Jacob Berger and his family. The log house was built in a traditional manner using dovetail notching and has a hall and parlor layout. A wooden frame addition was placed on the house circa 1868–72. Log houses such as this one were popular among low-income families as an inexpensive house type in wooded rural areas. The Berger-Kiel House is one of the few log houses remaining in the Mascoutah area. While it was originally located at 8910 Illinois Route 4, it was moved to its current site during the construction of MidAmerica St. Louis Airport.

The house was added to the National Register of Historic Places on August 12, 1999.
