= Craighead County Courthouse (Jonesboro, Arkansas) =

- U.S. National Register of Historic Places
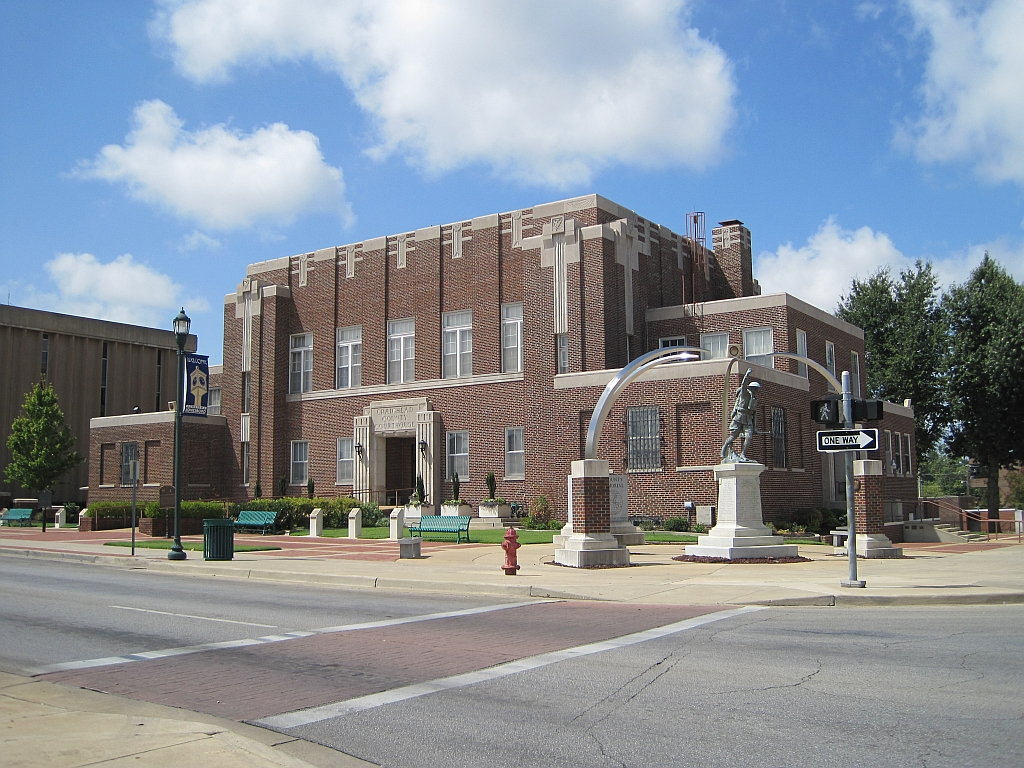

- Location within Arkansas Location within the United States
- Location: 511 Main St., Jonesboro, Arkansas
- Coordinates: 35°50′14″N 90°42′18″W
- Area: less than one acre
- Built: 1934
- Architect: Elmer A. Stuck
- Architectural style: Art Deco
- NRHP reference No.: 98000831
- Added to NRHP: September 11, 1998

The Craighead County Courthouse is located at 511 Main Street, in the center of Jonesboro, Arkansas, the county seat of Craighead County. It is a two-story brick structure with limestone trim, built in 1934, and is the city's only significant example of Art Deco architecture. The building has a stepped appearance, with a large central block that has an oversized second story, and is flanked by smaller two-story wings, from which single-story sections project to the front and back. Vertical panels of fluted limestone accentuate corner projections from the main block, a motif repeated near the roof line of that block. The main entrance is recessed in an opening flanked by similarly fluted panels. The courthouse is the fifth of the county to stand on the site. Near the entrance to the courthouse stands a copy of John Paulding's World War I memorial, Over the Top, placed in 1920, and often confused with E. M. Viquesney's "Spirit of the American Doughboy".

The courthouse was listed on the National Register of Historic Places in 1998.

== See also ==
- National Register of Historic Places listings in Craighead County, Arkansas
