= Berger House (Jonesboro, Arkansas) =

Historic house in Arkansas, United States

- U.S. National Register of Historic Places
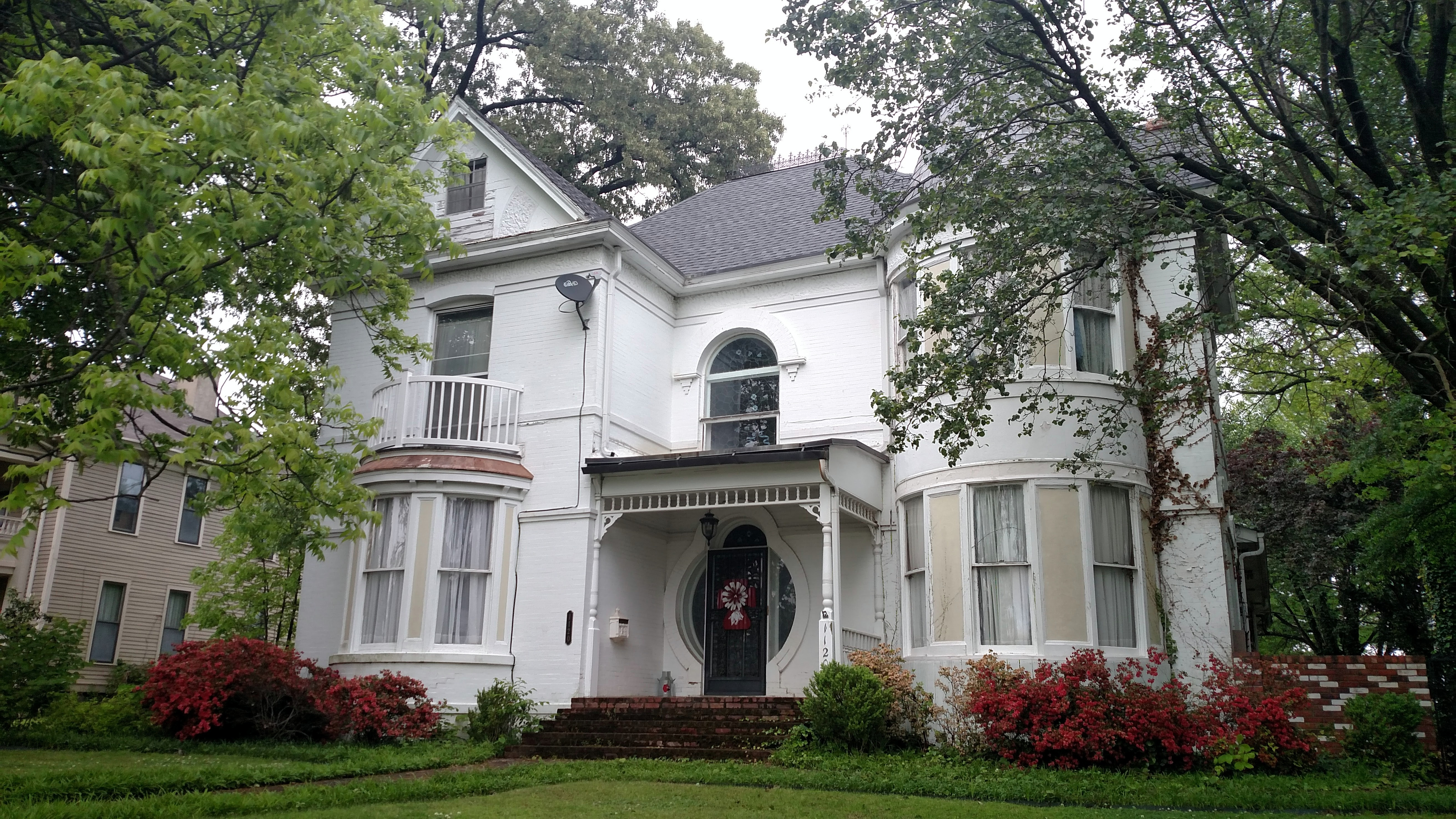

- Location within Arkansas Location within the United States
- Location: 1120 S. Main Street; Jonesboro, Arkansas
- Coordinates: 35°49′55″N 90°42′17″W
- Area: less than one acre
- Architectural style: Queen Anne
- NRHP reference No.: 96001272
- Added to NRHP: November 7, 1996

The Berger House is a historic house at 1120 South Main Street in Jonesboro, Arkansas.

== History ==
It was built in 1896 by Morris Berger, one of Jonesboro's first Jewish businessmen. The house was home to the Jonesboro public library between 1950 and 1964.

== Architecture ==
It is a two-story brick structure with a cross gable roof. The house is an example of the Queen Anne style in brick, although it has lost some details (notably its porch and decorative elements on its chimneys). A two-story turret is capped by a roof with polychrome and varied-shape slate, with a textured frieze board just below its roof line.

The house was listed on the National Register of Historic Places in 1996.

== See also ==
- National Register of Historic Places listings in Craighead County, Arkansas
