= 104.9 FM =

FM radio frequency

The following radio stations broadcast on FM frequency 104.9 MHz:

== Argentina ==
- EXN Radio in Rosario, Santa Fe
- LRS780 Cadena Regional in Máximo Paz, Santa Fe
- Radio María in Quimili, Santiago del Estero

== Australia ==
- hit104.9 The Border in Albury
- Triple M Sydney
- Base FM in Perth
- 8MIX in Darwin
- Rhema FM in Mount Gambier
- SBS Radio in Woomera
- Sunshine FM in Buderim

== Canada (Channel 285) ==
- CBDC-FM in Mayo, Yukon
- CBDN-FM in Dawson, Yukon
- CBON-FM-21 in Gogama, Ontario
- CBQL-FM in Savant Lake, Ontario
- CBYQ-FM in Queen Charlotte, British Columbia
- CFJR-FM in Brockville, Ontario
- CFMG-FM in Edmonton, Alberta
- CKKS-FM-2 Vancouver, British Columbia
- CFWF-FM in Regina, Saskatchewan
- CFXM-FM in Granby, Quebec
- CHHO-FM-1 in St-Alexis-des-Monts, Quebec
- CHWC-FM in Goderich, Ontario
- CIBM-FM-2 in Trois-Pistoles, Quebec
- CIMY-FM in Pembroke, Ontario
- CJLA-FM in Lachute, Quebec
- CKBC-FM in Bathurst, New Brunswick
- CKNX-FM-2 in Centreville, Ontario
- CKRE-FM in Ahtahkakoop First Nation, Saskatchewan
- CKTR-FM in North Bay, Ontario
- CKVX-FM in Kindersley, Saskatchewan

== China (mainland) ==
- CNR Business Radio in Huangshan
- CNR Music Radio in Shenzhen, Zhongshan and Zhuhai
- CNR The Voice of China in Jinzhou and Yangquan

== Colombia ==
- Vibra Bogotá in Bogotá, CU

== Hong Kong ==
- Transfers CNR Music Radio

== Israel ==
- Kan Tarbut in the Galilee Panhandle, Gush Dan, Haifa, Jerusalem, the Jordan Rift Valley, Negev

== Jamaica ==
- BBC World Service

== Macau ==
- Transfers CNR Music Radio

== Malaysia ==
- Ai FM in Johor Bahru, Johor and Singapore
- Melody in Taiping, Perak
- Sinar in Kota Kinabalu, Sabah
- Zayan in Klang Valley, Eastern Pahang and Seremban, Negeri Sembilan

== Mexico ==
- XHAND-FM in Puruándiro, Michoacán
- XHBD-FM in Banderilla, Veracruz
- XHCUL-FM in Culiacán, Sinaloa
- XHCZ-FM in San Luis Potosí, San Luis Potosí
- XHERK-FM in Tepic, Nayarit
- XHESO-FM in Ciudad Obregón, Sonora
- XHEXA-FM in Mexico City
- XHKS-FM in Saltillo, Coahuila
- XHLN-FM in Linares, Nuevo León
- XHLNC-FM in Tecate, Baja California
- XHMC-FM in Mexicali, Baja California
- XHMDA-FM in Monclova, Coahuila
- XHMEX-FM in Ciudad Guzmán, Jalisco
- XHMLO-FM in Malinalco, Estado de México
- XHNAQ-FM in Querétaro, Querétaro
- XHNLR-FM in Nuevo Laredo, Tamaulipas
- XHNVG-FM in Nuevo Casas Grandes, Chihuahua
- XHPMOC-FM in Ciudad Cuauhtémoc, Chihuahua
- XHPSEB-FM in San Sebastián Tecomaxtlahuaca-Santiago Juxtlahuaca, Oaxaca
- XHREC-FM in Villahermosa (Miguel Hidalgo Primera Sección), Tabasco

== Philippines ==
- DWKZ in Bacolor, Pampanga

== Sierra Leone ==
- Capital Radio Sierra Leone in Freetown & Kenema

== United Kingdom ==
- BBC Radio 4 in Betws Y Coed, Clyro Powys, Haverfordwest, Porthmadog and Pwhelli, Stirling
- BBC Radio Cymru in South Wales
- BBC Radio Leicester in Leicester
- BBC Radio Nan Gaidheal in Argyll & Bute, Highland, Islay, Isle of Lewis, Ullapool
- BBC Radio Wiltshire in Marlborough
- Dales Radio in Yorkshire Dales
- Greatest Hits Radio Greater Manchester in Stockport
- Radio X in London
- Sunshine in Belfast
- DCR (Dover Community Radio) 104.9FM in Dover, Kent.

== United States (Channel 285) ==
- KAGH-FM in Crossett, Arkansas
- KAKD in Dillingham, Alaska
- KAMA in Deer Park, Texas
- KAPY-LP in Duvall, Washington
- KBOE in Oskaloosa, Iowa
- KBTE in Tulia, Texas
- KBUK in La Grange, Texas
- KCLT in West Helena, Arkansas
- KCRZ in Tipton, California
- KDXY in Lake City, Arkansas
- KEEH in Spokane, Washington
- KEPD in Ridgecrest, California
- KEUC in Ringwood, Oklahoma
- KFBA-LP in Bakersfield, California
- KFFX (FM) in Emporia, Kansas
- KHPA in Hope, Arkansas
- KHUH-LP in Seattle, Washington
- KIBE in Broken Bow, Oklahoma
- KIIK-FM in De Witt, Iowa
- KIKF in Cascade, Montana
- KISK in Cal-Nev-Ari, Nevada
- KJAV in Alamo, Texas
- KKWD in Bethany, Oklahoma
- KLDE in Eldorado, Texas
- KLMJ in Hampton, Iowa
- KLQQ in Clearmont, Wyoming
- KLSM in Tallulah, Louisiana
- KMIQ in Robstown, Texas
- KMRR in Spencer, Iowa
- KMVR in Mesilla Park, New Mexico
- KNLX in Prineville, Oregon
- KNXX in Donaldsonville, Louisiana
- KPWB-FM in Piedmont, Missouri
- KQAT-LP in Hallsville, Texas
- KQXZ in Richland Springs, Texas
- KRCB-FM in Rohnert Park, California
- KREK in Bristow, Oklahoma
- KRFO-FM in Owatonna, Minnesota
- KRIG-FM in Nowata, Oklahoma
- KRNX in Rye, Colorado
- KRRR in Cheyenne, Wyoming
- KRYD (FM) in Norwood, Colorado
- KSAL-FM in Salina, Kansas
- KTCH in Emerson, Nebraska
- KTDD in Eatonville, Washington
- KTLK-FM in Columbia, Illinois
- KTMX in York, Nebraska
- KTOC-FM in Jonesboro, Louisiana
- KTXX-FM in Bee Cave, Texas
- KVOU-FM in Uvalde, Texas
- KWBT (FM) in Bellmead, Texas
- KWCX-FM in Tanque Verde, Arizona
- KWIM in Window Rock, Arizona
- KWLY-LP in Missoula, Montana
- KWSP-LP in Kerrville, Texas
- KXEA in Lowry City, Missouri
- KXNA in Springdale, Arkansas
- KXSC in Sunnyvale, California
- KYIX in South Oroville, California
- KYKA in Meadow Lakes, Alaska
- KYOM-LP in Wichita, Kansas
- KYTN in Union City, Tennessee
- KYXE in Union Gap, Washington
- KZEQ-LP in Harrison, Arkansas
- KZMP in Pilot Point, Texas
- KZQM in Sequim, Washington
- KZWA in Moss Bluff, Louisiana
- WAIR (FM) in Lake City, Michigan
- WAXI in Rockville, Indiana
- WBHS-LP in Brunswick, Georgia
- WBLN-LP in Glens Falls, New York
- WBOZ in Woodbury, Tennessee
- WBUV in Moss Point, Mississippi
- WBXX (FM) in Marshall, Michigan
- WCIM in Montour Falls, New York
- WCPN in Lorain, Ohio
- WCSD-LP in Shawnee-On-Delaware, Pennsylvania
- WCVO in Gahanna, Ohio
- WCVU in Solana, Florida
- WCWB in Marathon, Wisconsin
- WDLN-LP in Dunnellon, Florida
- WEGE in Lima, Ohio
- WEQL in La Crosse, Wisconsin
- WERK in Muncie, Indiana
- WFIW-FM in Fairfield, Illinois
- WFKY in Frankfort, Kentucky
- WFMZ (FM) in Hertford, North Carolina
- WFXE in Columbus, Georgia
- WHLB-LP in Cartersville, Georgia
- WHTF in Havana, Florida
- WIGO in White Stone, Virginia
- WIHS in Middletown, Connecticut
- WINN in Columbus, Indiana
- WINU in Altamont, New York
- WJRH in Easton, Pennsylvania
- WJRS in Jamestown, Kentucky
- WKDL in Brockport, New York
- WKHG in Leitchfield, Kentucky
- WKJN in Centreville, Mississippi
- WKKS in Vanceburg, Kentucky
- WKOS in Kingsport, Tennessee
- WKVL in La Follette, Tennessee
- WKZU in Iuka, Mississippi
- WLHH in Ridgeland, South Carolina
- WLKZ in Wolfeboro, New Hampshire
- WMCG in Milan, Georgia
- WMNG in Christiansted, Virgin Islands
- WNFM in Reedsburg, Wisconsin
- WNKC in Gloucester, Massachusetts
- WOAB in Ozark, Alabama
- WPCK in Denmark, Wisconsin
- WPDX in Clarksburg, West Virginia
- WPXN (FM) in Paxton, Illinois
- WQBX in Alma, Michigan
- WRBB in Boston, Massachusetts
- WRBF in Plainville, Georgia
- WREA-LP in Holyoke, Massachusetts
- WRKT in North East, Pennsylvania
- WRKY in Hollidaysburg, Pennsylvania
- WROO in Mauldin, South Carolina
- WSJO in Egg Harbor City, New Jersey
- WSKV in Stanton, Kentucky
- WSSM in Prentiss, Mississippi
- WSTV in Roanoke, Virginia
- WTKM in Hartford, Wisconsin
- WTSX-LP in Kokomo, Indiana
- WVDV-LP in Sebring, Florida
- WVRX in Strasburg, Virginia
- WWKC in Caldwell, Ohio
- WWKY-FM in Providence, Kentucky
- WWRR in Scranton, Pennsylvania
- WXCL in Pekin, Illinois
- WXKW (FM) in Key West, Florida
- WXLR in Harold, Kentucky
- WXRX in Belvidere, Illinois
- WYGC in High Springs, Florida
- WYLS in York, Alabama
- WYNA in Calabash, North Carolina
- WYRY in Hinsdale, New Hampshire
- WZEZ in Balsam Lake, Wisconsin
