= Ashley County, Arkansas =

County in Arkansas, United States

- County
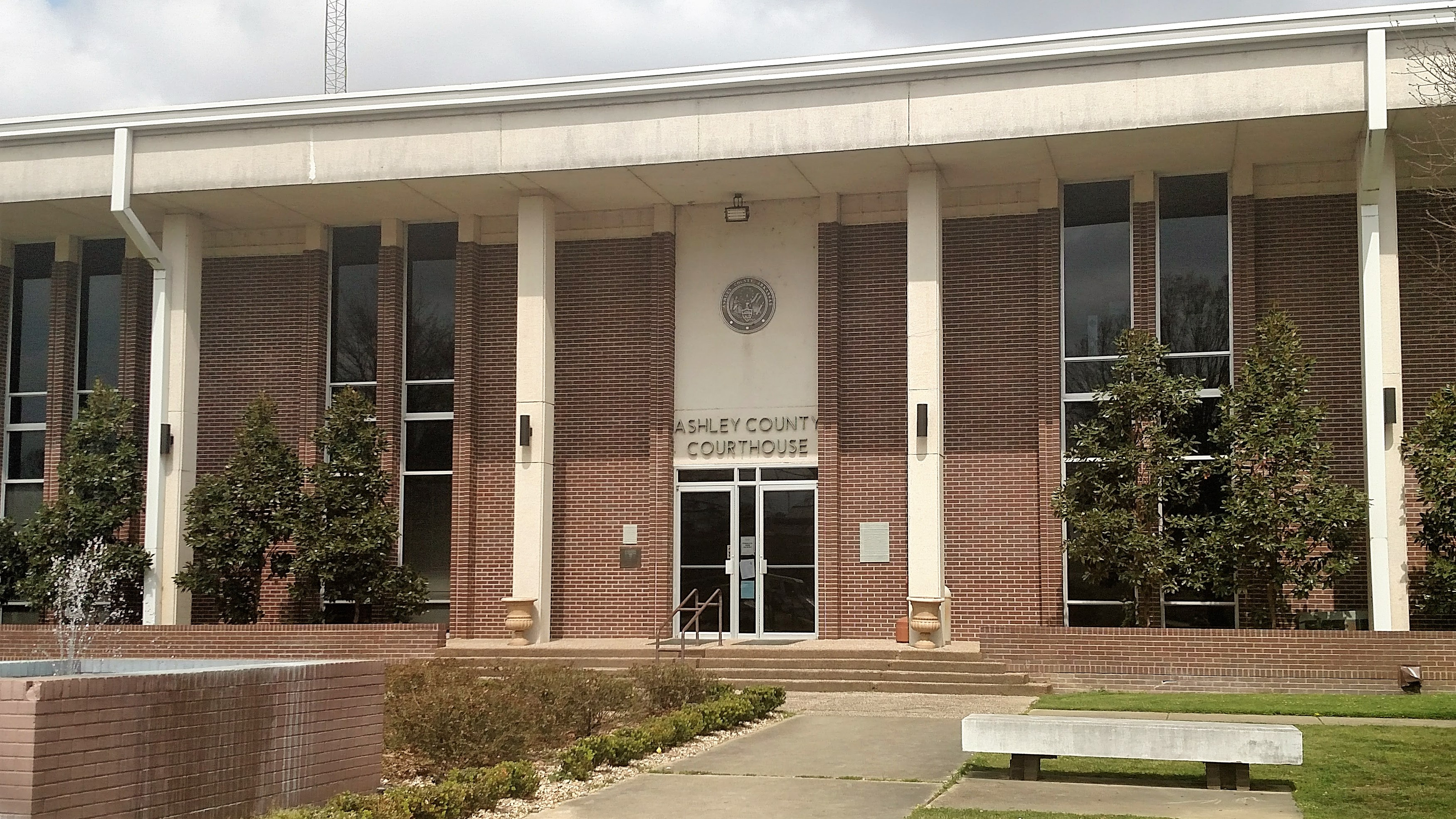
- Ashley County Courthouse in Hamburg

- Seal

- Location within the U.S. state of Arkansas
- Coordinates: 33°12′32″N 91°47′43″W
- Country: United States
- State: Arkansas
- Founded: November 30, 1848
- Named for: Chester Ashley
- Seat: Hamburg
- Largest city: Crossett

Area
  - Total: 583.5 sq mi (1,511.3 km^{2})
  - Land: 572.4 sq mi (1,482.5 km^{2})
  - Water: 11.2 sq mi (28.9 km^{2})

Population (2020)
  - Total: 19,062
  - Estimate (2025): 17,831 ▼
  - Density: 33.302/sq mi (12.858/km^{2})
- Time zone: UTC−6 (Central)
  - Summer (DST): UTC−5 (CDT)
- Congressional district: 4th
- Website: www.ashleycountyar.com

Ashley County is a rural South Arkansas county with a culture, economy, and history based on timber and agriculture. Created as Arkansas's 52nd county on November 30, 1848, Ashley County has seven incorporated municipalities, including Hamburg, the county seat and Crossett, the most populous city. The county is also the site of numerous unincorporated communities and ghost towns. The county is named for Chester Ashley, a prominent lawyer in the Arkansas Territory and U.S. senator from the state from 1844 to 1848.

The county is roughly divided into two halves by Bayou Bartholomew, with the rich, fertile, alluvial soils of the Arkansas Delta in the east, and the shortleaf pine forests of the Arkansas Timberlands in the west. The county contains six protected areas: Overflow National Wildlife Refuge, Felsenthal National Wildlife Refuge, three Wildlife Management Areas and the Crossett Experimental Forest. Other historical features such as log cabins, one-room school houses, community centers, and museums describe the history and culture of Ashley County.

Ashley County occupies 939.08 square miles (243,220 ha) and contained a population of 19,062 as of the 2020 Census. The economy is largely based on agriculture and small manufacturing. Poverty and unemployment rates are above national averages, but steady. Household incomes are below state and national averages.

Ashley County is mostly served by two school districts, Hamburg School District and Crossett School District. Higher education is provided at University of Arkansas at Monticello College of Technology—Crossett, a public two-year community college in Crossett. Ashley County Medical Center in Crossett is a community hospital providing primary care in the county. Although no Interstate highways serve Ashley County, the county has access to three United States highways (U.S. Route 82 [US 82], US 165, and US 425) and eleven Arkansas state highways. Ashley County is also served by one public owned/public use general aviation airport, Z. M. Jack Stell Field, one electric cooperative (Ashley-Chicot Electric Cooperative), and ten community water systems provide potable water to customers in the county. It is an alcohol prohibition or dry county.

== History ==
Ashley County, the fifth-largest county in Arkansas in terms of land area, was formed by the 7th Arkansas General Assembly on November 30, 1848, from portions of Drew, Chicot and Union Counties. It was named after Chester Ashley, a US Senator and land speculator. The final borders were laid in 1861.

The first settlement in Ashley County appears to have been made by the French at Longview. Now there is no trace of Longview that was a river town connecting the Arkansas Post and Monroe, Louisiana. The Fogle and Gulett families claimed to have located at Longview in 1768 or 1770. In 1846 Captain Phillip Derden came from Virginia and moved to Longview. He bought furs and skins from hunters and trappers and ran a general store for pioneer settlers. He built a log warehouse and a lived in a 2-story log cabin. The home of Isaac Denson in Fountain Hill served as the temporary county seat until a new centrally located town could be established in 1849. It was named "Hamburg" in honor of "fine deer hams" enjoyed by the county commissioners making the selection in the vicinity. The 1850 courthouse was replaced in 1905 but was lost in a fire in 1921. The current courthouse was built in the 1960s. The courtroom in the courthouse has a one-of-a-kind architecture: it is round, and the seats are arranged so that members of the audience can always see each other.

John R. Steelman, who wrote his 1928 PhD dissertation on "mob action in the South", wrote:

Ashley County has had five lynchings since 1900, the last of which occurred in 1927. On February 19, 1904 at Crossett - a sawmill town - a Negro was lynched for Murder and on September 5, another for "assaulting whites". In 1908 the only lynching in the state was at Parkdale, Ashley County. Earnest Williams was thrust into eternity by a band of men who were "outraged" at him for "using offensive language"'. On May 30, 1909 a Negro was lynched at Portland for Murder. The last lynching in Ashley County occurred on August 26, 1927, Winston Pounds was "taken from a posse of deputy sheriffs" and hanged to a tree one and a half miles from Wilmot, charged with having "attacked a young married woman".

== Geography ==
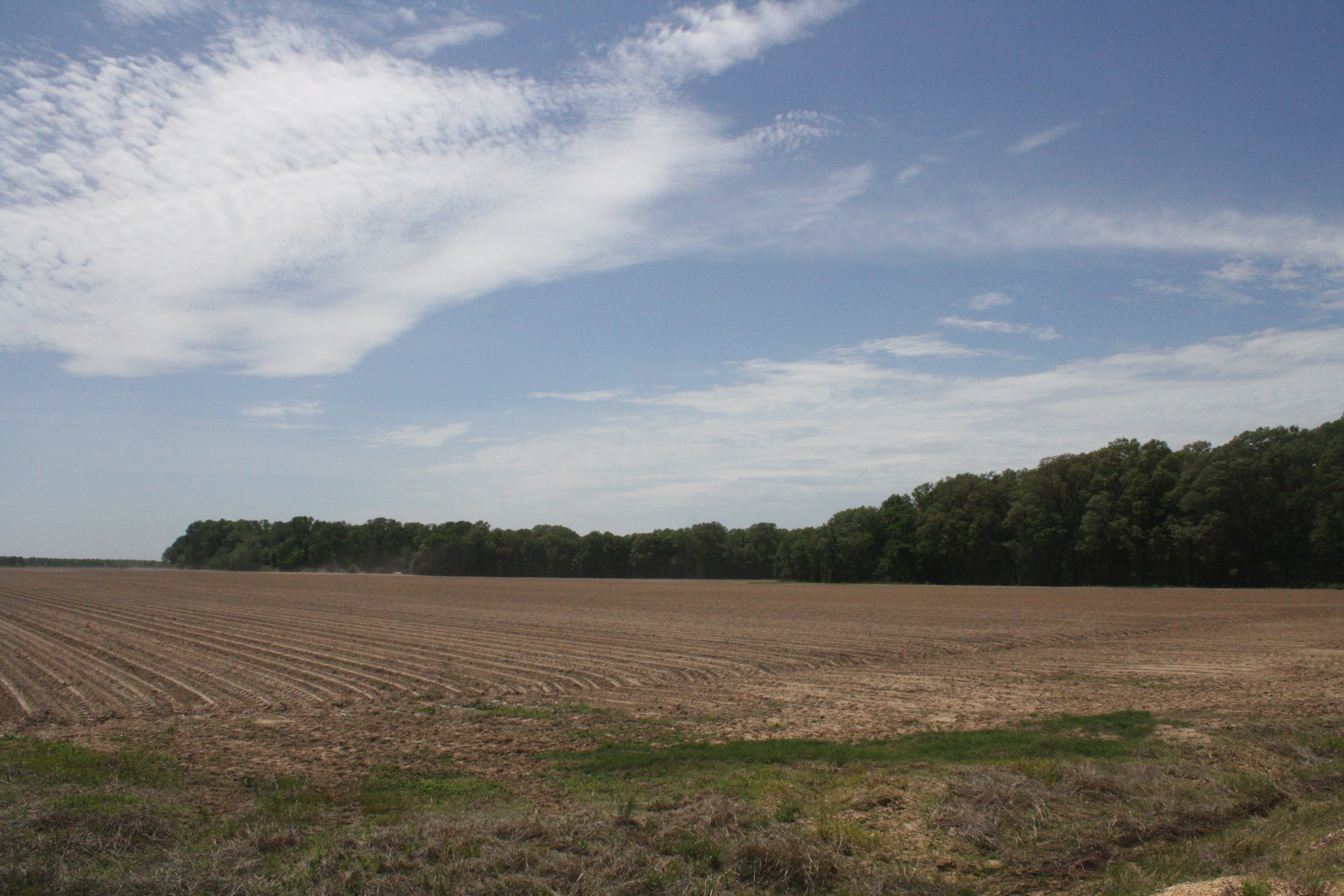
Typical Arkansas Delta field ready for planting with the Bayou Bartholomew riparian area in the background

Ashley County is split between two geographic regions, divided by the Bayou Bartholomew. The rich, fertile, alluvial soils of the Mississippi Alluvial Plain extend into the eastern part of the county. In Arkansas, this region is called the Arkansas Delta (in Arkansas, usually referred to as "the Delta"), having a distinct history and culture from adjacent regions. West of the Ouachita, Ashley County is characterized by forests of shortleaf pine and hardwoods typical of the Gulf Coastal Plain. In Arkansas, this region is referred to as the Arkansas Timberlands, a subdivision of the Piney Woods.

According to the U.S. Census Bureau, the county has a total area of 941 square miles (2,440 km^{2}), of which 925 square miles (2,400 km^{2}) is land and 15 square miles (39 km^{2}) (1.6%) is water. The lowest point in the state of Arkansas is located on the Ouachita River in Ashley County and Union County, where it flows out of Arkansas and into Louisiana.

The county is located approximately 58 miles (93 km) north of Monroe, Louisiana, 118 miles (190 km) south of Little Rock, and 158 miles (254 km) northwest of Jackson, Mississippi. (Note: Mileages from Ashley County to Monroe, Little Rock, and Jackson are based on highway miles using county seat Hamburg for Ashley County.)

=== Adjacent counties ===
- Drew County - north
- Chicot County - east
- Morehouse Parish, Louisiana - south
- Union Parish, Louisiana - southwest
- Union County - west
- Bradley County - northwest

=== Hydrology ===
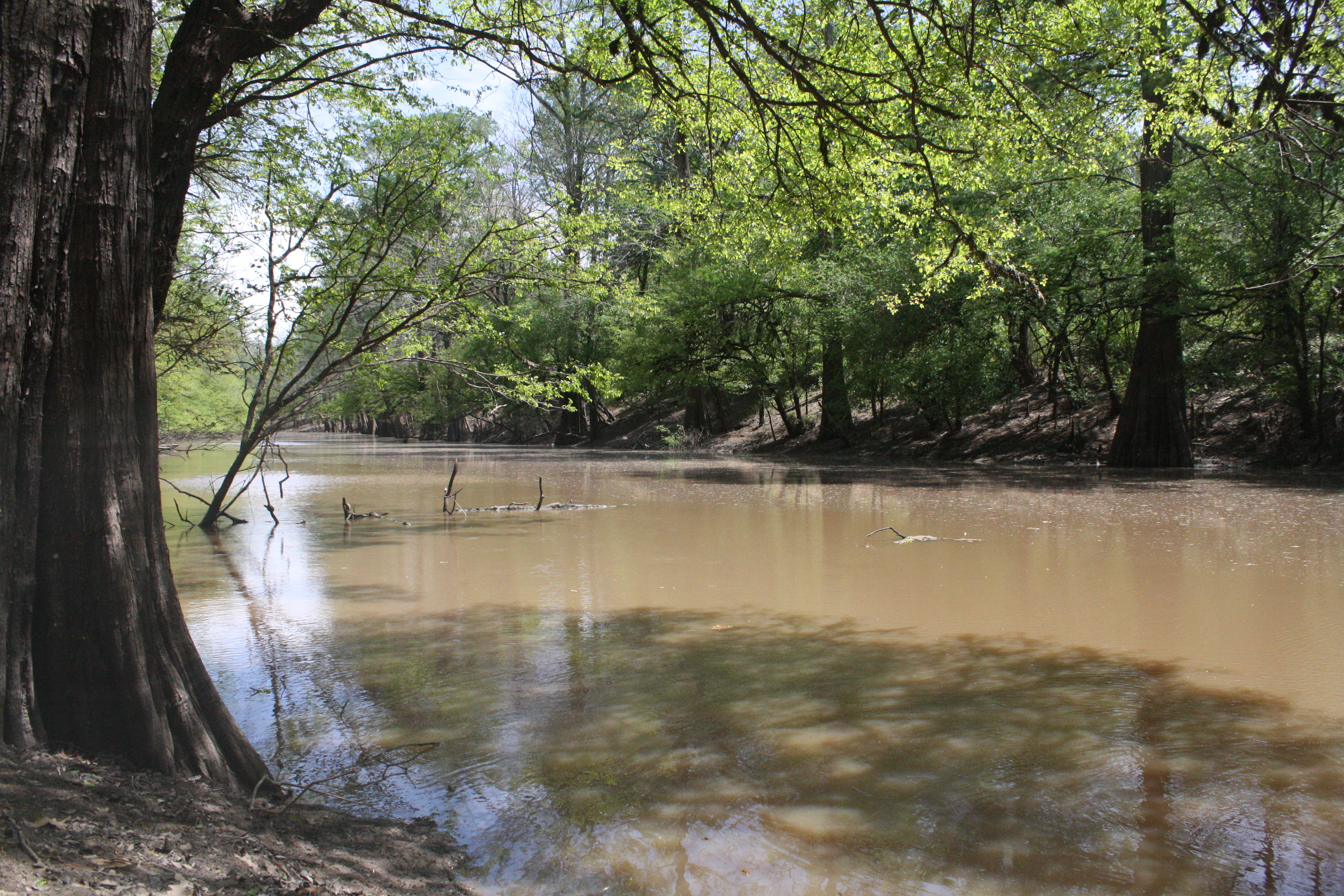
Looking upstream along Bayou Bartholomew on the edge of Little Bayou WMA

Water is an extremely important part of Ashley County's geography, history, economy, and culture. The many rivers, streams, and ditches crossing the county have featured prominently since prehistoric times, and many archaeological sites, including the Lake Enterprise Mound from the Archaic period, are along waterways. Many early white settlements, including Berea, Arkansas, were founded along waterways, but many faded as railroads eclipsed waterways as the favored mode of transportation.

Ashley County is split among four watersheds: the lower Saline River in the northwest, lower Ouachita River in the southwest, Bayou Bartholomew across the majority of the county, and the Boeuf River along the eastern edge. The Saline River serves as the northwestern boundary of the county before emptying into the Ouachita River, which serves as the southwestern boundary. The Port of Crossett is positioned just south of the Saline River's mouth. Within the county, Bearhouse Creek, Chemin-a-haut Bayou, Fountain Creek, Flat Creek, Mill Creek, and Overflow Creek are important watercourses.

=== Protected areas ===
Ashley County contains Overflow National Wildlife Refuge, part of the Felsenthal National Wildlife Refuge, and four Wildlife Management Areas (WMAs) under Arkansas Game and Fish Commission jurisdiction.

Beryl Anthony Lower Ouachita WMA preserves seasonally flooded bottomland hardwood forest habitat along the Ouachita River between the Felsenthal NWR and the Louisiana state line for preservation, recreation, and hunting opportunities. Duck hunting, especially when the Ouachita River floods, is the primary hunting opportunity due to the site's position along the Mississippi Flyway, with deer and squirrel hunting also available during the year. Most of the 7,020 acres (2,840 ha) is on the Union County side of the Ouachita River, leaving the only public access to the Ashley County area via boat. A small segment in Ashley County contains the Coffee Prairie Natural Area, owned by the Arkansas Natural Heritage Commission.

The Casey Jones Leased Lands WMA is a common name for five fragmented parcels in Ashley and Drew counties established in 1988. The two largest segments in Ashley County are south of Crossett and in the northwest corner of the county, with a small area northwest of the Overflow WMA also included in Casey Jones WMA. This lease includes segments of working forest actively managed for forest products, primarily by single tree selection. Habitats range from upland pine to bottomland hardwood depending upon location. Deer and turkey hunting are most common in the WMA.

Little Bayou WMA is located in northeastern Ashley County along the western banks of Bayou Bartholomew at the mouth of Little Bayou. The area contains a boat ramp on Bayou Bartholomew, as well as birding, camping, fishing, and hunting. The former agricultural area was replanted with bottomland and upland hardwoods, short-leaf pines, and native warm season grasses in the 1990s.

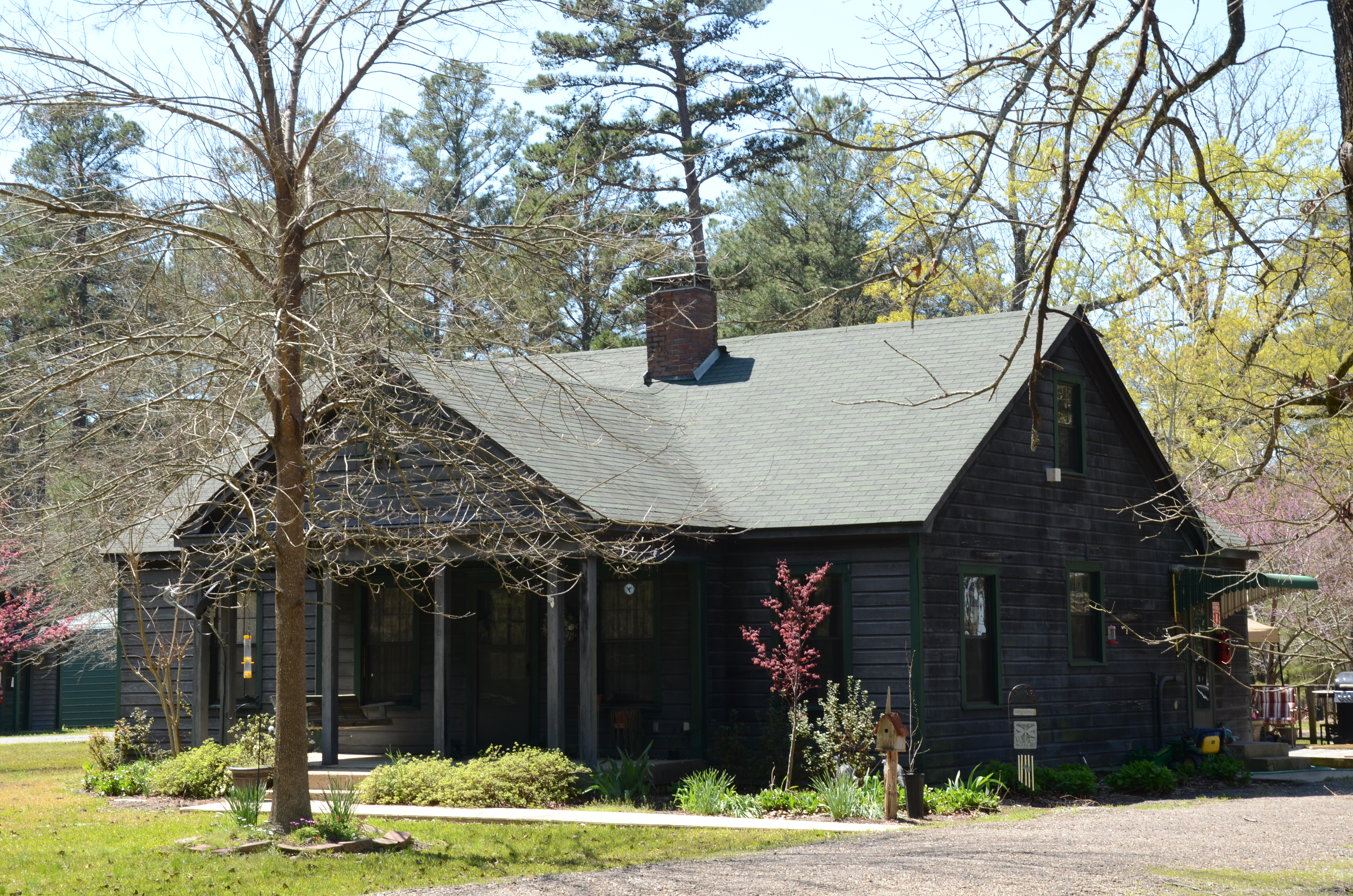
Residence at the Experimental Forest built by the CCC, now listed on the NRHP

The Crossett Experimental Forest is a 1,765 acres (714 ha) property donated by Georgia-Pacific Corporation in 1934 to research forest management in second-growth loblolly pine and shortleaf pine forests. Within the Forest is the Reynolds Natural Area, a stand that has been largely untouched since the area's creation in 1934. The property is managed by the Southern Research Station of the United States Forest Service.

== Demographics ==
Historical population
Census	Pop.	Note	%±
1850	2,058		—
1860	8,590		317.4%
1870	8,042		−6.4%
1880	10,156		26.3%
1890	13,295		30.9%
1900	19,734		48.4%
1910	25,268		28.0%
1920	23,410		−7.4%
1930	25,151		7.4%
1940	26,785		6.5%
1950	25,660		−4.2%
1960	24,220		−5.6%
1970	24,976		3.1%
1980	26,538		6.3%
1990	24,319		−8.4%
2000	24,209		−0.5%
2010	21,853		−9.7%
2020	19,062		−12.8%
2025 (est.)	17,831	▼	−6.5%
U.S. Decennial Census; 1790–1960 1900–1990; 1990–2000 2010–2016

=== 2020 Census ===
As of the 2020 census, the county had a population of 19,062. The median age was 43.7 years. 22.7% of residents were under the age of 18 and 21.2% of residents were 65 years of age or older. For every 100 females there were 92.5 males, and for every 100 females age 18 and over there were 89.0 males age 18 and over.

The racial makeup of the county was 68.0% White, 24.5% Black or African American, 0.3% American Indian and Alaska Native, 0.2% Asian, <0.1% Native Hawaiian and Pacific Islander, 3.3% from some other race, and 3.7% from two or more races. Hispanic or Latino residents of any race comprised 5.8% of the population.

37.7% of residents lived in urban areas, while 62.3% lived in rural areas.

There were 8,019 households in the county, of which 29.0% had children under the age of 18 living in them. Of all households, 45.9% were married-couple households, 19.0% were households with a male householder and no spouse or partner present, and 30.4% were households with a female householder and no spouse or partner present. About 30.4% of all households were made up of individuals and 14.7% had someone living alone who was 65 years of age or older.

There were 9,371 housing units, of which 14.4% were vacant. Among occupied housing units, 72.8% were owner-occupied and 27.2% were renter-occupied. The homeowner vacancy rate was 1.9% and the rental vacancy rate was 11.0%.

=== 2010 Census ===
Racial/Ethnic Makeup of Ashley County treating Hispanics as a Separate Category (2010)
1. White Non-Hispanic (68.2%)
2. Black Non-Hispanic (25.7%)
3. Native American Non-Hispanic (0.20%)
4. Asian Non-Hispanic (0.20%)
5. Pacific Islander Non-Hispanic (0.00%)
6. Other Non-Hispanic (0.00%)
7. Two or more races Non-Hispanic (0.80%)
8. Hispanic Any Race (4.90%)

As of the 2010 census, there were 21,853 people, 8,765 households, and 6,227 families residing in the county. The population density was 23 people per square mile (8.9 people/km^{2}). There were 10,137 housing units at an average density of 11 units per square mile (4.2 units/km^{2}). The racial makeup of the county was 69.3% White, 25.8% Black or African American, 0.3% Native American, 0.5% Asian, 0.2% Pacific Islander, 3.2% from other races, and 1.1% from two or more races. 4.9% of the population were Hispanic or Latino of any race.

There were 8,765 households, out of which 33.9% had children under the age of 18 living with them, 51.5% were married couples living together, 14.9% had a female householder with no husband present, and 29.0% were non-families. 26.1% of all households were made up of individuals, and 11.8% had someone living alone who was 65 years of age or older. The average household size was 2.47 and the average family size was 2.96.

In the county, the population was spread out, with 21.4% under the age of 18, 11.0% from 18 to 24, 23.7% from 25 to 44, 27.6% from 45 to 64, and 16.2% who were 65 years of age or older. The median age was 40.3 years. For every 100 females there were 94.1 males. For every 100 females age 18 and over, there were 90.7 males.

The median income for a household in the county was $23,673, and the median income for a family was $34,934. Males had a median income of $43,594 versus $21,897 for females. The per capita income for the county was $18,779. About 14.3% of families and 18.5% of the population were below the poverty line, including 25.9% of those under age 18 and 12.5% of those age 65 or over.

=== 2000 Census ===
As of the 2000 census, there were 24,209 people, 9,384 households, and 6,906 families residing in the county. The population density was 26 people per square mile (10 people/km^{2}). There were 10,615 housing units at an average density of 12 units per square mile (4.6 units/km^{2}). The racial makeup of the county was 69.78% White, 27.10% Black or African American, 0.21% Native American, 0.18% Asian, 0.05% Pacific Islander, 1.73% from other races, and 0.96% from two or more races. 3.21% of the population were Hispanic or Latino of any race.

There were 9,384 households, out of which 33.60% had children under the age of 18 living with them, 56.80% were married couples living together, 13.00% had a female householder with no husband present, and 26.40% were non-families. 23.90% of all households were made up of individuals, and 11.20% had someone living alone who was 65 years of age or older. The average household size was 2.55 and the average family size was 3.02.

In the county, the population was spread out, with 26.80% under the age of 18, 8.30% from 18 to 24, 27.20% from 25 to 44, 23.90% from 45 to 64, and 13.80% who were 65 years of age or older. The median age was 36 years. For every 100 females there were 93.30 males. For every 100 females age 18 and over, there were 90.60 males.

The median income for a household in the county was $31,758, and the median income for a family was $37,370. Males had a median income of $35,089 versus $19,501 for females. The per capita income for the county was $15,702. About 13.90% of families and 17.50% of the population were below the poverty line, including 25.70% of those under age 18 and 17.20% of those age 65 or over.

As of 2010 Ashley County had a population of 21,853 people. 68.19% of the population were non-Hispanic whites, 25.81% were blacks, 0.32% Native Americans, 0.18% Asians and 4.89% Hispanics or Latinos.

In 2000, the largest denominational group was the Evangelical Protestants (with 16,752 adherents) and Mainline Protestants (with 1,817 adherents). The largest religious bodies were The Southern Baptist Convention (with 11,398 members) and The American Baptist Association (with 2,890 members).

== Human resources ==
=== Education ===
Educational attainment in Ashley County is typical for a rural Arkansas county, with a 2012 study finding 84.9% of Ashley County residents over age 25 held a high school degree or higher and 13.2% holding a bachelor's degree or higher, compared to Arkansas statewide averages of 84.8% and 21.1%. Ashley County is significantly below national averages of 86.7% and 29.8%, respectively.

==== Primary and secondary education ====
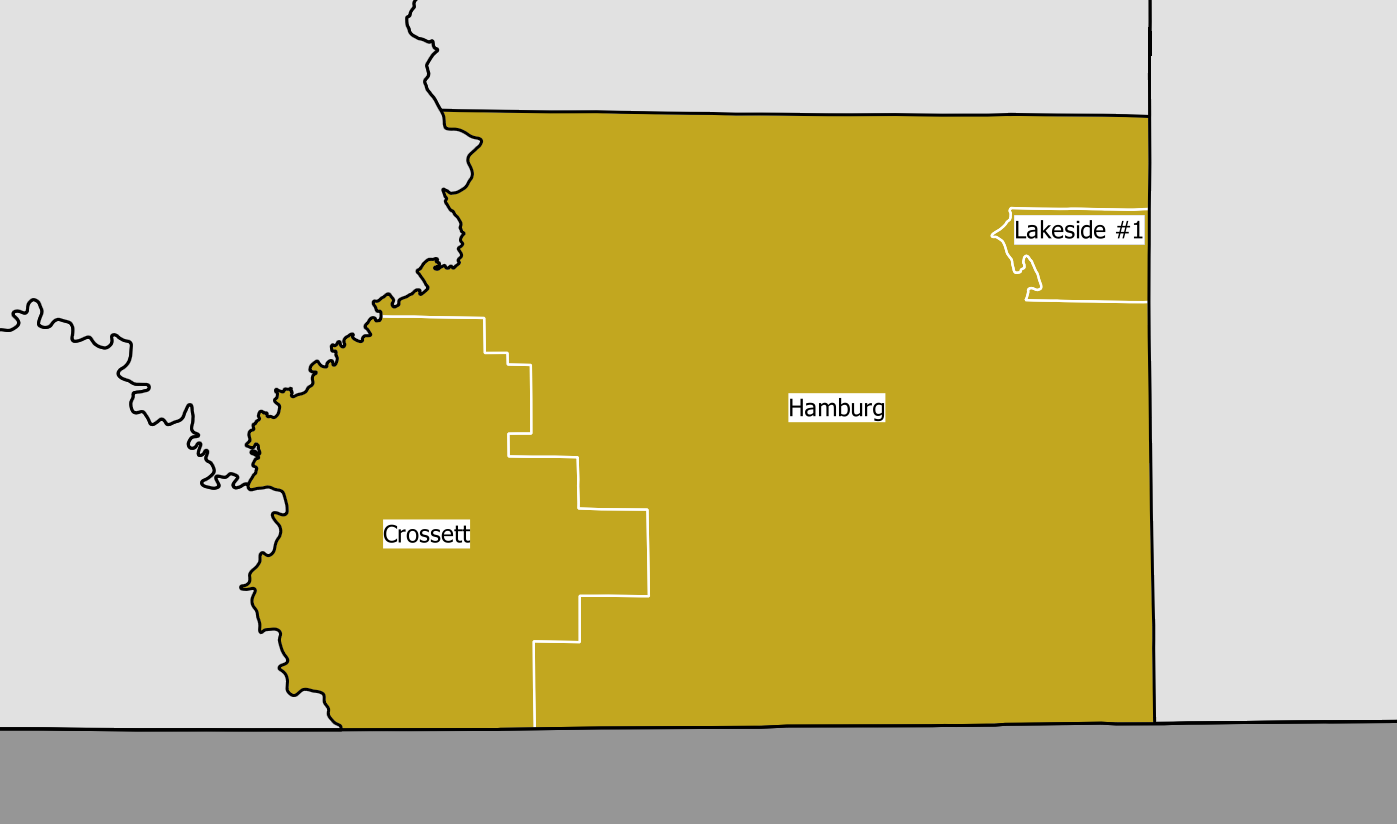
Public school district boundaries in Ashley County as of July 2016

Two public school districts are based in Ashley County; Hamburg School District is the largest school district in Ashley County, with the Crossett School District serving the west side of the county. Successful completion of the curriculum of these schools leads to graduation from Hamburg High School or Crossett High School, respectively. Both high schools are accredited by the Arkansas Department of Education (ADE). A small area in eastern Ashley County is served by the Lakeside School District, which is based in Lake Village.

==== Higher education ====
There are no institutions of higher education in Ashley County. The nearest public community college is Louisiana Delta Community College in Bastrop, Louisiana, followed by South Arkansas Community College in El Dorado. Nearby public four-year universities include University of Arkansas at Monticello, University of Louisiana at Monroe, and Louisiana Tech University in Ruston, Louisiana. The University of Arkansas at Monticello's College of Technology—Crossett, formerly the Forest Echoes Technology Institute, is located between North Crossett and Hamburg and offers associate degrees in general and industrial technology and technical certifications in a number of medical and technical programs.

==== Libraries ====
Ashley County has two libraries: the Ashley County Library in Hamburg and Crossett Public Library in Crossett. Both institutions offers books, e-books, media, reference, youth, business and genealogy services.

=== Public health ===
Ashley County's above-average poverty rate also indicates a high Medicaid eligibility rate. As of 2012, 35.3% of Ashley County was eligible for Medicaid, with 72.5% of children under 19 eligible for ARKids First, a program by the Arkansas Department of Human Services that combines children's Medicaid (ARKids A) and other programs for families with higher incomes (ARKids B). The county's population is significantly above healthy weight, with 71.9% of adults and 39.8% of children/adolescents ranking as overweight or obese, above the state averages of 67.1% and 39.3%, themselves significantly above national averages of 62.9% and 30.3%, respectively.

The Ashley County Medical Center in Crossett is the nearest medical center offering acute inpatient care, emergency care, diagnostics, general surgery, orthopedic surgery, OB/GYN, rehabilitation, therapy, and senior care services. The facility is rated as a Level 4 Trauma Center by the Arkansas Department of Health.

The nearest Level 1 Trauma Centers are Arkansas Children's Hospital and University of Arkansas for Medical Sciences, both in Little Rock.

=== Public safety ===
The Ashley County Sheriff's Office is the primary law enforcement agency in the county. The agency is led by the Ashley County Sheriff, an official elected by countywide vote every four years. Police departments in Crossett, Hamburg, Portland and Wilmot provide law enforcement in their respective jurisdictions, with remaining municipalities contracting with the Ashley County Sheriff's Office for law enforcement services.

The county is under the jurisdiction of the Ashley County District Court, a local district court. Local district courts in Arkansas are courts of original jurisdiction for criminal, civil, small claims, and traffic matters. Local district courts are presided over by an elected part-time judge who may privately practice law. The district court has two departments, Crossett and Hamburg.

Superseding district court jurisdiction is the 10th Judicial Circuit Court, which covers Ashley, Bradley, Chicot, Desha, Drew counties. The 10th Circuit contains three circuit judges, elected to six-year terms circuitwide.

Fire protection is provided by twelve agencies in Ashley County, together covering the entire county except approximately 2 square miles (5.2 km^{2}) in the Felsenthal NWR. The seven incorporated municipalities and two census-designated places each provide fire protection, in some cases extending beyond corporate limits. Rural areas are served by the Berlin Volunteer Fire Department, Milo Fire Department, or Unity Frost Prairie Fire Department. All fire departments in Ashley County are volunteer-based, except the Crossett Fire Department.

== Culture and contemporary life ==
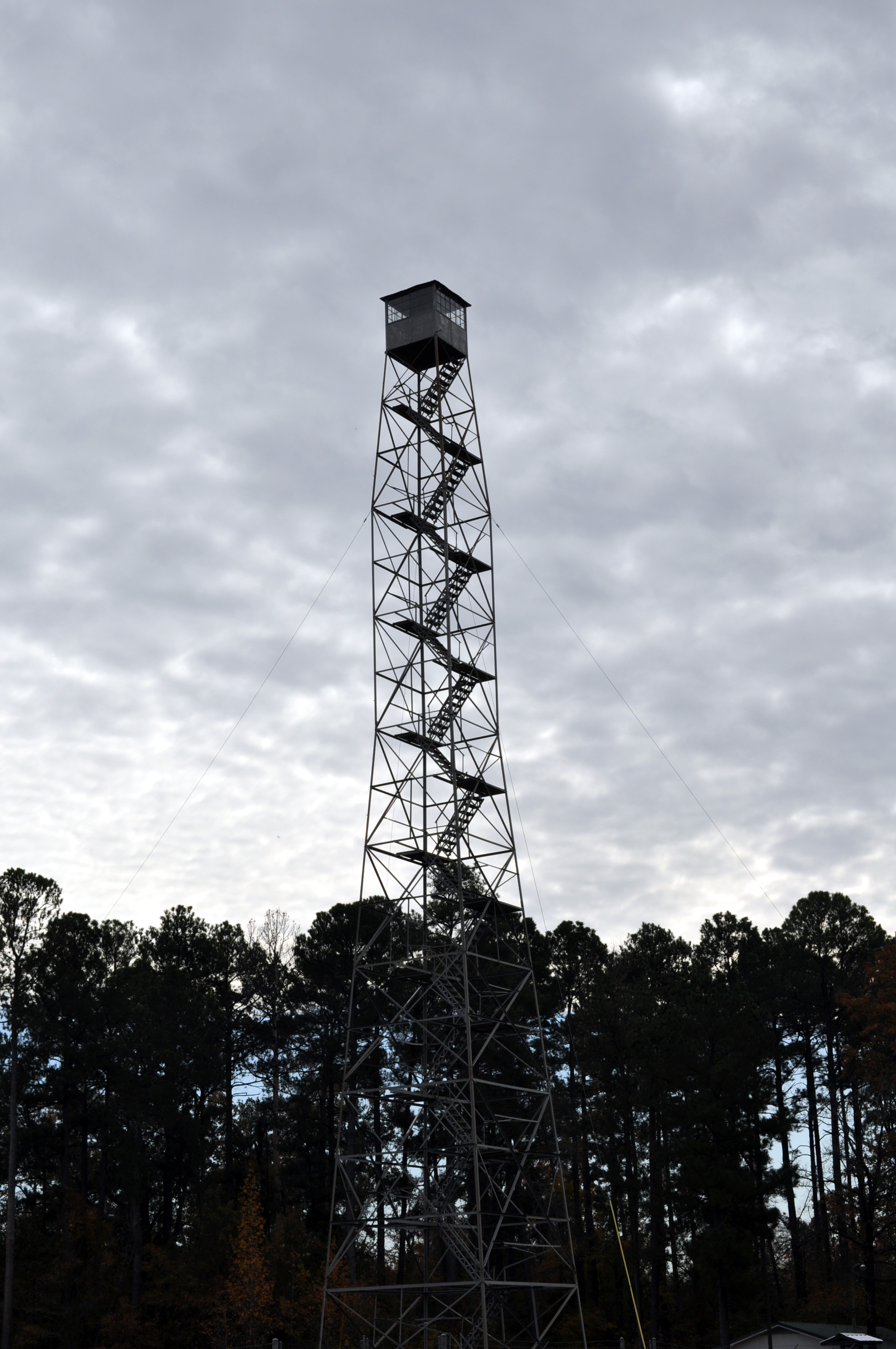
The 1935 Crossroads Fire Tower is the tallest of its type in Arkansas

Ashley County has several facilities, monuments, and museums dedicated to preserving the history and culture of the area. The Ashley County Museum, owned and operated by the Ashley County Historical Society, preserves and interprets the history and culture of Ashley County for visitors. Four properties related to the history of forestry are listed on the National Register of Historic Places, including the Crossroads Fire Tower, installed by the Civilian Conservation Corps in 1935. The Old Company House Museum in Crossett City Park is one of the original mill houses constructed by the Crossett Lumber Company prior to 1910. The house contains period decorations and offers tours by appointment. Other cultural points of interest in Ashley County include:

- Six churches listed on the NRHP in Ashley County maintain the history and culture of evangelical Protestantism in the area
- The Ashley County Farmer's Market is an informal market (no set times).
- The Hamburg Garden Club has been located in a historic church at the corner of Cherry and Lincoln Streets since 1987.

=== Annual cultural events ===
Hamburg hosts the World Famous Armadillo Festival annually during the first weekend in May. The Ashley County Fair is hosted during the first weekend in September at the Ashley County Fairgrounds in Hamburg, and includes a rodeo and the Miss Ashley County pageant in the Maxwell Hill Auditorium. Crossett hosts the Crossett Professional Rodeo Cowboys Association Rodeo in August and the Wiggins Cabin Arts & Crafts Festival each October.

The two most famous people from Ashley County are likely former NBA world champion Scottie Pippen, and talent manager Joe Jackson, who was the patriarch of the Jackson family that includes Michael Jackson and Janet Jackson.

=== Media ===
The Ashley County Ledger of Hamburg and the Ashley News Observer of Crossett are the county's two weekly newspapers.

Ashley County is within the Monroe, Louisiana-El Dorado designated market area with the following local TV stations: KNOE (dual ABC/CBS and The CW), KARD (Fox), KTVE (NBC), and two PBS affiliates: KLTM-TV (Louisiana) and KETZ (Arkansas).

The county is home to two FM radio stations: KAGH-FM (104.9 FM, "Today's Country 104.9") and KWLT (102.7 FM). and KAGH (800 AM, "Oldies Radio 800").

== Government and politics ==
The county government is a constitutional body granted specific powers by the Constitution of Arkansas and the Arkansas Code. The quorum court is the legislative branch of the county government and controls all spending and revenue collection. Representatives are called justices of the peace and are elected from county districts every even-numbered year. The number of districts in a county vary from nine to fifteen based on population, and district boundaries are drawn by the Ashley County Election Commission. The Ashley County Quorum Court has nine members. Presiding over quorum court meetings is the county judge, who serves as the chief operating officer of the county. The county judge is elected at-large and does not vote in quorum court business, although capable of vetoing quorum court decisions.

Ashley County, Arkansas Elected countywide officials
Position	Officeholder	Party
County Judge	Jim Hudson	Republican
County Clerk	Christie Martin	Republican
Circuit Clerk	Vickie Stell	Independent
Sheriff	Tommy Sturgeon	Republican
Treasurer	Stacey Breshears	Republican
Collector	Lori Pennington	Republican
Assessor	Beth Rush	Republican
Coroner	Keith Medders	Republican

The composition of the Quorum Court following the 2024 elections is 7 Republicans, 1 Democrat, and 1 Independent. Justices of the Peace (members) of the Quorum Court following the elections are:

- District 1: Ron Miller (I)
- District 2: Billy Pippen (D)
- District 3: Jimmy Pennington (R)
- District 4: Rickey Nelms (R)
- District 5: Jeff Langley (R)
- District 6: Ronald D. Wheeler (R)
- District 7: Rhonda Pippen (R)
- District 8: Bob Rush (R)
- District 9: Greg Sivils (R)

Additionally, the townships of Ashley County are entitled to elect their own respective constables, as set forth by the Constitution of Arkansas. Constables are largely of historical significance as they were used to keep the peace in rural areas when travel was more difficult. The township constables as of the 2024 elections are:

- Egypt: Frankie Tanksley (R)
- Extra: James L. Austin (D)
- Millcreek: Dwight Smitty (R)

=== Presidential Elections ===
Since the mid-20th century, Ashley County has transitioned from reliably Democratic to steady Republican in national, state and local elections. Ashley County was part of the Solid South, a period of Democratic hegemony which began after Reconstruction following the Civil War. This resulted essentially in a one-party system, in which a candidate's victory in Democratic primary elections was tantamount to election to the office itself. The Solid South started to dissolve following the Civil Rights Act in 1964, which is when Ashley County's streak of supporting Democratic candidates ended. Republican presidential candidate support continued to grow after 1964, although Ashley County strongly supported fellow Southerners in Presidential elections: Alabama Governor George Wallace in 1968, Georgia Governor Jimmy Carter in 1976, fellow Arkansan Bill Clinton in 1992 and 1996, and U.S. vice president Al Gore in 2000. By the 2004 election, the county narrowly supported George W. Bush, but subsequently supported Barack Obama's opponents and Donald Trump by large margins.

=== Political Culture ===
United States presidential election results for Ashley County, Arkansas
Year	Republican		Democratic		Third party(ies)	
Year	No.	%	No.	%	No.	%
1896	405	17.96%	1,760	78.05%	90	3.99%
1900	524	27.18%	1,381	71.63%	23	1.19%
1904	347	29.84%	804	69.13%	12	1.03%
1908	821	41.24%	1,100	55.25%	70	3.52%
1912	439	23.15%	1,029	54.27%	428	22.57%
1916	463	23.36%	1,519	76.64%	0	0.00%
1920	725	35.04%	1,312	63.41%	32	1.55%
1924	506	30.69%	1,048	63.55%	95	5.76%
1928	786	36.02%	1,393	63.84%	3	0.14%
1932	188	6.88%	2,537	92.83%	8	0.29%
1936	95	6.43%	1,382	93.57%	0	0.00%
1940	184	9.10%	1,835	90.71%	4	0.20%
1944	285	11.59%	2,169	88.17%	6	0.24%
1948	197	8.18%	1,844	76.58%	367	15.24%
1952	1,249	26.41%	3,471	73.40%	9	0.19%
1956	1,183	27.70%	2,820	66.04%	267	6.25%
1960	1,288	25.63%	3,118	62.04%	620	12.34%
1964	3,742	55.77%	2,901	43.23%	67	1.00%
1968	1,470	18.59%	2,035	25.74%	4,401	55.67%
1972	5,506	76.44%	1,680	23.32%	17	0.24%
1976	3,092	37.01%	5,253	62.88%	9	0.11%
1980	3,960	45.27%	4,552	52.03%	236	2.70%
1984	5,675	62.44%	3,373	37.11%	41	0.45%
1988	4,111	47.48%	4,466	51.58%	82	0.95%
1992	2,686	28.08%	5,876	61.42%	1,005	10.50%
1996	2,428	29.32%	5,011	60.51%	842	10.17%
2000	3,876	46.86%	4,253	51.42%	142	1.72%
2004	4,567	53.65%	3,881	45.59%	64	0.75%
2008	5,406	62.55%	2,976	34.44%	260	3.01%
2012	4,867	61.44%	2,859	36.09%	195	2.46%
2016	5,338	66.04%	2,408	29.79%	337	4.17%
2020	5,548	70.00%	2,125	26.81%	253	3.19%
2024	5,145	73.19%	1,774	25.23%	111	1.58%

In Congress, Arkansas has been represented by two Republican senators, John Boozman and Tom Cotton, since January 3, 2015, ending a long history of Democratic hegemony. In the House of Representatives, Ashley County is the easternmost county within the 4th congressional district, which contains Southwest Arkansas, the Arkansas River Valley, and a few Ozark counties. The 4th has been represented by Bruce Westerman since 2014.

In the Arkansas Senate, Ashley County is within the 1st District. The district contains much of Southeast Arkansas and has been represented by Ben Gilmore (R) since 2021. In the Arkansas House of Representatives, Ashley and Chicot counties make up the 95th district, which has been represented by Howard M. Beaty Jr. (R) since 2021.

=== Taxation ===
Property tax is assessed by the Ashley County Assessor annually based upon the fair market value of the property and determining which tax rate, commonly called a millage in Arkansas, will apply. The rate depends upon the property's location with respect to city limits, school district, and special tax increment financing (TIF) districts. This tax is collected by the Ashley County Collector between the first business day of March of each year through October 15 without penalty. The Ashley County Treasurer disburses tax revenues to various government agencies, such as cities, county road departments, fire departments, libraries, and police departments in accordance with the budget set by the quorum court.

Sales and use taxes in Arkansas are voter approved and collected by the Arkansas Department of Finance and Administration. Arkansas's statewide sales and use tax has been 6.5% since July 1, 2013. Ashley County has an additional sales and use tax of 1.50% since July 1, 2010. Within Ashley County, the City of Crossett has an additional 2.25% sales and use tax since January 1, 2014, and Fountain Hill, Hamburg, Portland, and Wilmot have a 1.00% sales and use tax rate. The Arkansas State Treasurer disburses tax revenue to counties/cities in accordance with tax rules.

== Communities ==
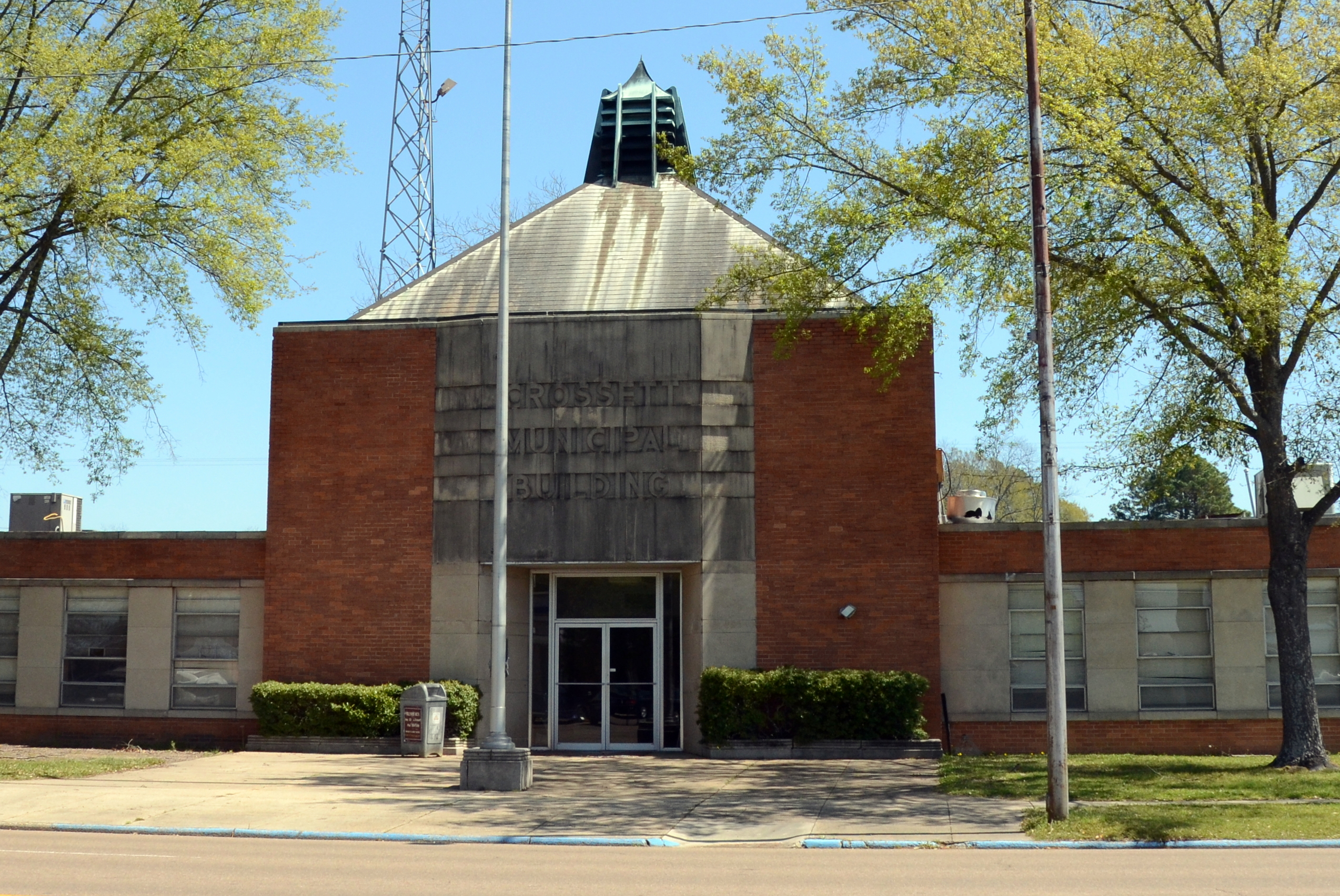
The historic Crossett Municipal Building is home to municipal government in Crossett

Six incorporated cities and one town are located within the county. The largest city is Crossett, located in the southwest part of the county near the Ouachita River. Crossett's population in 2010 was 5,507, but including the two adjacent unincorporated census designated places of North Crossett and West Crossett, the total population was 10,752 in 2010. The county seat, Hamburg is centrally located in the county and had a population of 2,857 at the 2010 Census. The four remaining cities are all located along US 165 in the eastern part of the county, and have populations below 1,000 people: Montrose, Parkdale, Portland, and Wilmot. The lone incorporated town, Fountain Hill, is located north of Hamburg and had a population of 175 in 2010.

Ashley County has dozens of unincorporated communities and ghost towns within its borders. This is due to early settlers in Arkansas tending to settle in small clusters rather than incorporated towns, especially along bayous or river landings in Ashley County. For example, communities like Longview and Milo had a post office or other buildings at some point in their history. Other communities are simply a few dwellings at a crossroads that have adopted a common place name over time. Some are officially listed as populated places by the United States Geological Survey, and others are listed as historic settlements.

=== Unincorporated communities ===
- Beech Creek Crossing
- Berea
- Berlin
- Bovine
- Boydell
- Cremer
- Crossroad
- Donbey
- Forest Park Addition
- Gulledge
- Kimball
- Lloyd
- Longview Crossing
- Martinville
- Meridian
- Miller's Chapel
- Milo
- Mist
- Moore's Mill
- Mount Olive
- Mount Pleasant
- Oakhurst Addition
- Old Milo
- Post Oak
- Promised Land
- Pugh
- Rawls
- Riley
- Roark
- Rolfe Junction
- Snyder
- South Crossett
- Stillions
- Sulphur Springs
- Sunshine
- Thebes
- Trafalgar
- Unity
- Venice
- Wallace
- White
- Whitlow
- Whitlow Junction
- Petersburg

=== Historical communities ===
- Brushy
- Elon
- Jackson
- Matoka
- Phelan
- White

=== Townships ===
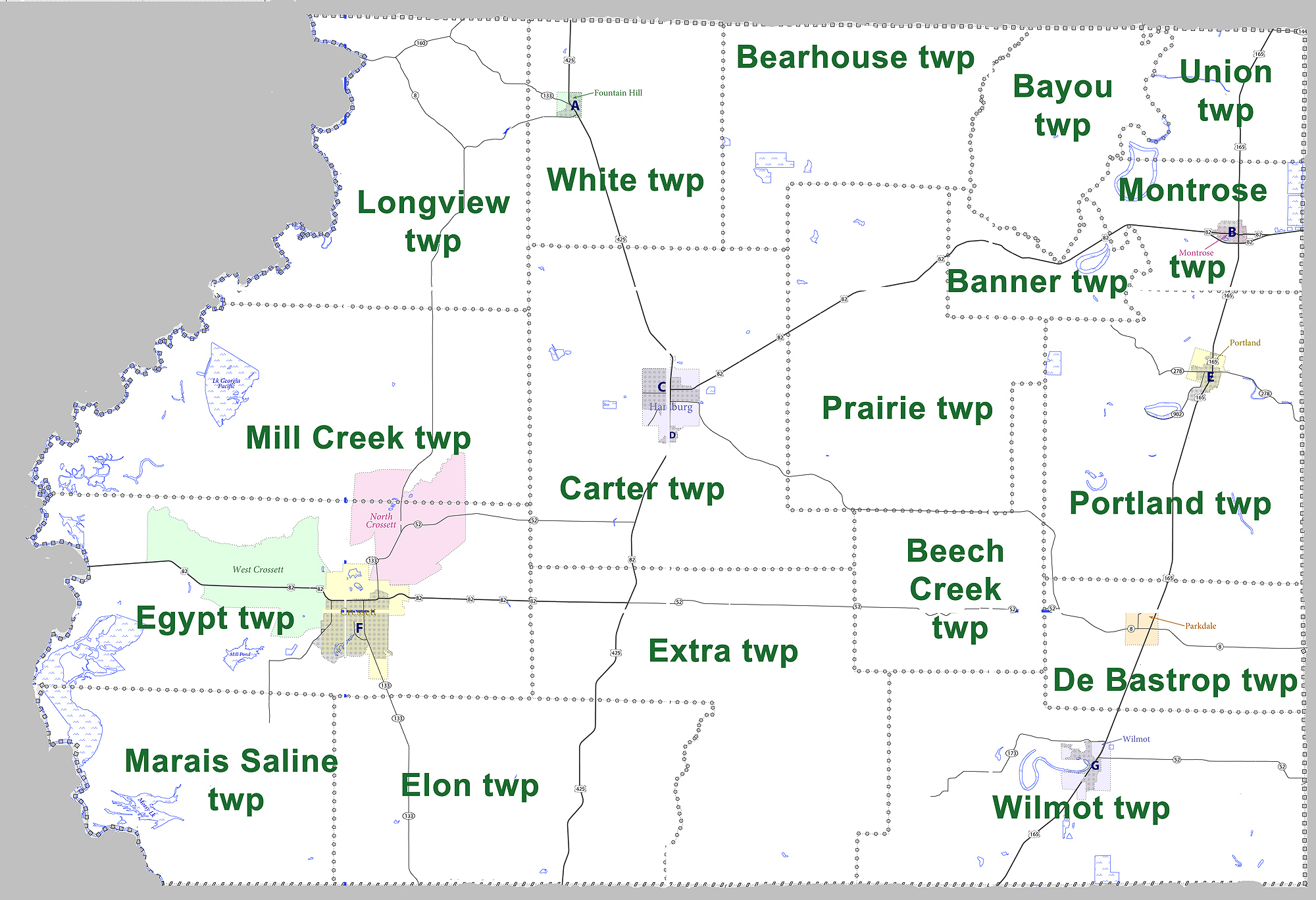
Townships in Ashley County, Arkansas, as of 2010

Townships in Arkansas are the divisions of a county. Each township includes unincorporated areas; some may have incorporated cities or towns within part of their boundaries. Arkansas townships have limited purposes in modern times. However, the United States census does list Arkansas population based on townships (sometimes referred to as "county subdivisions" or "minor civil divisions"). Townships are also of value for historical purposes in terms of genealogical research. Each town or city is within one or more townships in an Arkansas county based on census maps and publications. The townships of Ashley County are listed below; listed in parentheses are the cities, towns, and/or census-designated places that are fully or partially inside the township.

- Banner
- Bayou
- Bearhouse
- Beech Creek
- Carter (contains Hamburg)
- De Bastrop (contains Parkdale)
- Egypt (contains Crossett, West Crossett, and most of North Crossett)
- Elon
- Extra
- Longview
- Marais Saline
- Mill Creek (contains part of North Crossett)
- Montrose (contains Montrose)
- Portland (contains Portland)
- Prairie
- Union
- White (contains Fountain Hill)
- Wilmot (contains Wilmot)

== Infrastructure ==
=== Aviation ===
The county contains one public owned/public use airport: Z. M. Jack Stell Field, a small, rural airport east of Crossett with over 16,000 annual operations, almost entirely agricultural spraying operations. Ashley County also contains five private airfields in the eastern part of the county.

=== Major highways ===
- US 82
- US 165
- US 425
- AR 8
- AR 52
- AR 133
- AR 160
- AR 173
- AR 189
- AR 209
- AR 902

=== Utilities ===
The Ashley-Chicot Electric Cooperative, based in Hamburg, is a non-profit electric utility cooperative serving the rural areas of Ashley County with electric service, as well as parts of adjacent counties. Entergy Arkansas provides electricity for the cities of Hamburg and Crossett and nearby populated outlying areas, and to the small communities along US 165.

The Arkansas Department of Health (ADH) is responsible for the regulation and oversight of public water systems throughout the state. Ten community water systems are based in Ashley County: the Crossett Water Commission, Fountain Hill Waterworks, Hamburg Waterworks, Montrose/Boydell Water System, North Crossett Utilities, Northeast Crossett Water Association, Parkdale Waterworks, Portland Waterworks, Wilmot Waterworks, and the West Ashley County Water Association. All use groundwater as the source. (Note: Northeast Crossett purchases from North Crossett and West Ashley County purchases from the Crossett Water Commission.) The Crossett Water Commission has the largest direct retail population served (8,038, all in Ashley County), followed by Hamburg (5,481), and North Crossett Utilities (2,924). The remaining water systems have under 1,000 retail population served.

== See also ==
- List of lakes in Ashley County, Arkansas
- National Register of Historic Places listings in Ashley County, Arkansas
- List of counties in Arkansas
