= KAGH =

KAGH may refer to:

- KAGH (AM), a radio station (800 AM) licensed to serve Crossett, Arkansas, United States
- KAGH-FM, a radio station (104.9 FM) licensed to serve Crossett, Arkansas
- KAZN, a radio station (1300 AM) licensed to serve Pasadena, California, United States, which held the call sign KAGH from 1948 to 1950
