= WKKS =

WKKS can refer to:

- WKKS (AM), a radio station (1570 AM) licensed to Vanceburg, Kentucky, United States
- WKKS-FM, a radio station (104.9 FM) licensed to Vanceburg, Kentucky, United States
