= Sunshine, Arkansas =

Sunshine, Arkansas may refer to the following unincorporated communities:

- Sunshine, Ashley County, Arkansas
- Sunshine, Garland County, Arkansas
