= KXTM =

KXTM may refer to:

- KXTM (FM), a radio station (94.3 FM) licensed to serve Benavides, Texas, United States
- KXTM-LP, a defunct low-power television station (channel 21) formerly licensed to serve San Antonio, Texas
- KOUL, a radio station (107.7 FM) licensed to serve Benavides, Texas, which held the call sign KXTM from 1994 to 2015
