= ZNW-FM =

Radio station

- Nassau; Bahamas
- Broadcast area: New Providence
- Frequency: 88.3 MHz
- Branding: WORD SBC Radio

Programming
- Format: religious
- Affiliations: 3ABN Radio, LifeTalk Radio

Ownership
- Owner: Seventh-day Adventists South Bahamas Conference

History
- First air date: 17:00, May 31, 2012 (−05:00)
- Call sign meaning: ZN, former ITU prefix under United Kingdom rule, plus W for Word

Technical information
- ERP: 1,400 watts
- Transmitter coordinates: 25°02′41″N 77°22′16″W

Links
- Webcast: http://ltr.streamon.fm/
- Website: Official website

ZNW-FM is a radio station in Nassau, Bahamas broadcasting a religious format to the southern Bahamas. It is an affiliate of 3ABN Radio and LifeTalk Radio. The station first aired on March 31, 2012, with help from LifeTalk Radio in Fort Worth, Texas.
