= Bayou Township, Arkansas =

Bayou Township, Arkansas may refer to:

- Bayou Township, Ashley County, Arkansas
- Bayou Township, Baxter County, Arkansas

== See also ==
- List of townships in Arkansas
