= Bearhouse Township, Arkansas =

Bearhouse Township, Arkansas may refer to:

- Bearhouse Township, Ashley County, Arkansas
- Bearhouse Township, Drew County, Arkansas

== See also ==
- List of townships in Arkansas
