= KLRF =

KLRF may refer to:

- KLRF (FM), a radio station (88.5 FM) licensed to Milton-Freewater, Oregon, United States
- the ICAO code for Little Rock Air Force Base, in Little Rock, Arkansas, United States
