= WPXN =

WPXN may refer to:

- WPXN-TV, a television station (channel 34, virtual 31) licensed to New York, New York, United States
- WPXN (FM), a radio station (104.9 FM) licensed to Paxton, Illinois, United States
- WHTK (AM), a radio station (1280 AM) licensed to Rochester, New York, United States; known as WPXN in the late 1970s and early 1980s
