= Z. M. Jack Stell Field =

Airport in Arkansas, United States

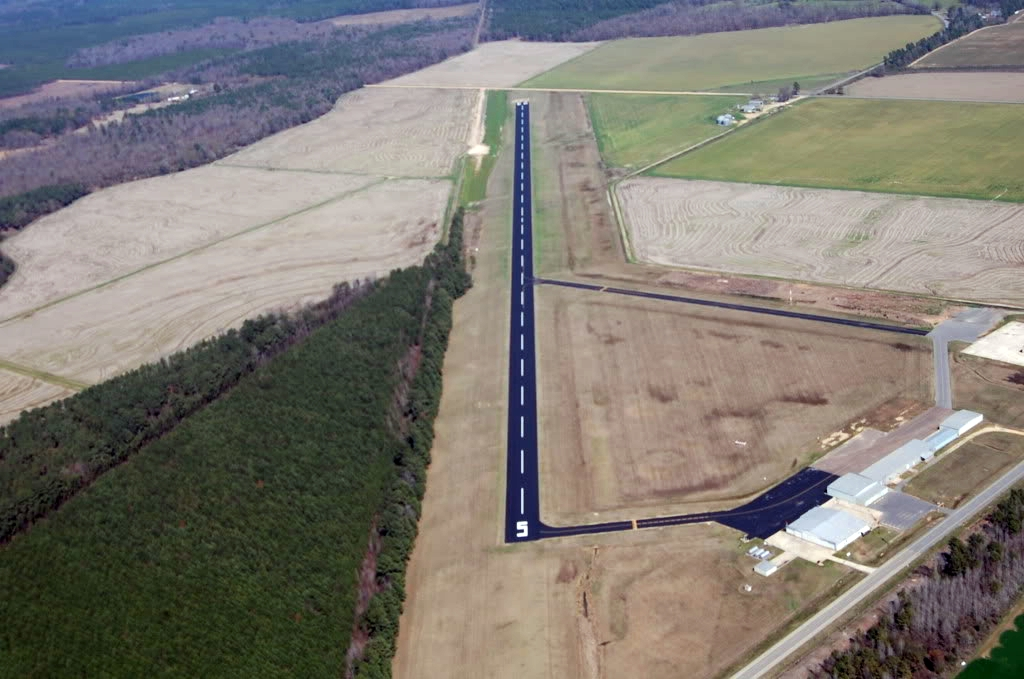
- IATA: CRT; ICAO: KCRT; FAA LID: CRT

Summary
- Airport type: Public
- Owner: City of Crossett
- Serves: Crossett, Arkansas
- Elevation AMSL: 184 ft (56 m)
- Coordinates: 33°10′42″N 091°52′49″W

Map
- Location of airport in Arkansas CRT (the United States)

Runways
Direction	Length		Surface
Direction	ft	m	Surface
5/23	5,009	1,527	Asphalt

Statistics (2010)
- Aircraft operations: 15,095
- Based aircraft: 9
- Source: Federal Aviation Administration

Z. M. Jack Stell Field (IATA: CRT, ICAO: KCRT, FAA LID: CRT) is a city-owned public-use airport located five nautical miles (6 mi, 9 km) northeast of the central business district of Crossett, in Ashley County, Arkansas, United States.

This airport is included in the FAA's National Plan of Integrated Airport Systems for 2011–2015, which categorized it as a general aviation facility.

== Facilities and aircraft ==
Z. M. Jack Stell Field covers an area of 126 acres (51 ha) at an elevation of 184 feet (56 m) above mean sea level. It has one runway designated 5/23 with an asphalt surface measuring 5,009 by 75 feet (1,527 x 23 m).

For the 12-month period ending March 31, 2010, the airport had 15,095 aircraft operations, an average of 41 per day: 99% general aviation, 1% military, and <1% air taxi. At that time there were 9 aircraft based at this airport: 89% single-engine and 11% multi-engine.

== See also ==
- List of airports in Arkansas
