= KEUC =

- Ringwood, Oklahoma; United States
- Frequency: 104.9 MHz

Programming
- Format: Catholic Religious

Ownership
- Owner: Oklahoma Catholic Broadcasting, Inc.

Technical information
- Licensing authority: FCC
- Facility ID: 191538
- Class: A
- ERP: 100 watts
- HAAT: 21 meters (69 ft)
- Transmitter coordinates: 36°23′12″N 98°14′48″W

Links
- Public license information: Public file; LMS
- Website: okcr.org

KEUC (104.9 FM) is a radio station licensed to Ringwood, Oklahoma, United States. The station is currently owned by Oklahoma Catholic Broadcasting, Inc.

KEUC broadcasts a Catholic Religious format to the Ringwood, Oklahoma, area.

== History ==
This station was assigned call sign KEUC on December 5, 2013.
