= Athletics at the 2023 Pan American Games – Men's 10,000 metres =

Men's 10,000 metres at the 2023 Pan American Games
- Venue: Julio Martínez National Stadium
- Dates: November 3
- Competitors: 12 from 8 nations
- Winning time: 28:17.84

Medalists
Gold medal	Isai Rodriguez	United States
Silver medal	Sam Chelanga	United States
Bronze medal	Alberto González	Independent Athletes Team

The men's 10,000 metres competition of the athletics events at the 2023 Pan American Games was held on November 3 at the Julio Martínez National Stadium.

== Records ==
Prior to this competition, the existing world and Pan American Games records were as follows:

World record	Joshua Cheptegei (UGA)	26:11.00	Valencia, Spain	October 7, 2020
Pan American Games record	José David Galván (MEX)	28:08.74	Rio de Janeiro, Brazil	July 27, 2007

== Schedule ==
Date	Time	Round
November 3, 2023	18:10	Final

== Results ==
=== Final ===
The results were as follows:

Rank	Name	Nationality	Time	Notes
1st place, gold medalist(s)	Isai Rodriguez	United States	28:17.84	
2nd place, silver medalist(s)	Samuel Chelanga	United States	29:01.21	
3rd place, bronze medalist(s)	Alberto González	Independent Athletes Team	29:12.24	
4	Carlos Díaz	Chile	29:22.54	
5	Héctor Pagán	Puerto Rico	29:29.22	SB
6	Marcelo Laguera	Mexico	29:29.48	
7	Mario Pacay	Independent Athletes Team	29:34.29	
8	Ignácio Velásquez	Chile	29:55.69	
9	José Luis Rojas	Peru	30:11.02	
10	Iván Darío González	Colombia	30:13.81	
11	Víctor Zambrano	Mexico	30:49.99	
	Daniel Nascimento	Brazil	DNS	
