= XHKS-FM =

Radio station in Saltillo, Coahuila

- Saltillo, Coahuila; Mexico
- Broadcast area: Saltillo, Coahuila
- Frequency: 104.9 FM

Ownership
- Owner: ROSSA; (Radio Organización Saltillo S.A.)

History
- First air date: September 23, 1938

Technical information
- Licensing authority: CRT
- Class: B1
- ERP: 25 kW
- HAAT: −115.11 m (−377.7 ft)
- Transmitter coordinates: 25°25′51.16″N 101°00′24.64″W

XHKS-FM is a radio station on 104.9 FM in Saltillo, Coahuila, owned by Radio Organización Saltillo, S.A. (ROSSA).

== History ==
XEKS-AM signed on for the first time on September 23, 1938 making it the first radio station in Saltillo. It was owned by Efraín López and broadcast on 1330, then 960 kHz. It was transferred from Efrain López's estate to ROSSA, another company under the same family ownership, in 1972.

In 2013, XHKS-FM began transmission on the FM band.
