= XHPMOC-FM =

Radio station in Ciudad Cuauhtémoc, Chihuahua, Mexico

- Ciudad Cuauhtémoc, Chihuahua; Mexico
- Frequency: 104.9 FM
- Branding: Radiomax

Programming
- Format: Regional Mexican

Ownership
- Owner: Radiomax; (Ricardo Alan Boone Salmon)
- Operator: Gramer Corp

History
- First air date: January 2018
- Call sign meaning: Ciudad CuauhtéMOC

Technical information
- Licensing authority: CRT
- Class: A
- ERP: 98 watts
- HAAT: 152.3 m (500 ft)
- Transmitter coordinates: 28°23′40″N 106°50′56″W

Links
- Website: www.radiomax.com.mx

XHPMOC-FM is a radio station on 104.9 FM in Ciudad Cuauhtémoc, Chihuahua. It is owned by Gramer Corp and operated by Radio as "Radiomax" with a grupera format.

== History ==
XHPMOC was awarded in the IFT-4 radio auction of 2017 and came to air in January 2018 with a formal inauguration in late February; the station originally was affiliated with the La Mejor format from MVS Radio.

On April 12, 2020, operation of the station transferred to Bustillos Radio, resulting in a name change and disaffiliation from MVS.
