= Isai Rodriguez =

American runner (born 1998)

Personal information
- Born: March 13, 1998 (age 28) Enid, Oklahoma, U.S.
- Home town: Ringwood, Oklahoma, U.S.
- Education: Ringwood High School

Sport
- Sport: Athletics
- Events: 5000 metres, 10,000 metres
- College team: Oklahoma State
Medal record
Men's athletics
Representing United States
Pan American Games
Gold medal – first place	2023 Santiago	10,000 m

Isai Rodriguez (born March 13, 1998) is an American long-distance runner. He competed in track for his local high school in Ringwood, Oklahoma and collegiately for the Oklahoma State Cowboys, graduating in spring 2023 as a multiple-time All American in both track and cross-country. He won the gold medal in the 10,000 m at the 2023 Pan American Games.

== Personal bests ==
Outdoor

- 1500 metres – 3:44.65 (Fayetteville 2023)
- 3000 metres – 7:58.57 (Ames, IA 2022)
- 5000 metres – 13:41.02 (Oxford, MS 2021)
- 10,000 metres – 27:52.92 (Eugene, OR 2021)

Indoor

- Mile – 4:05.64 (Fayetteville 2019)
- 3000 metres – 7:54.33 (Note: Oversized track, not legal) (Seattle 2019)
- 5000 metres – 13:25.84 (Boston 2022)
