= Mount Olive, Ashley County, Arkansas =

Mount Olive, Arkansas
- Unincorporated community
- Location within Arkansas Location within the United States
- Coordinates: 33°22′20″N 91°40′55″W
- Country: United States
- State: Arkansas
- County: Ashley
- Elevation: 164 ft (50 m)
- Time zone: UTC-6 (Central (CST))
  - Summer (DST): UTC-5 (CDT)
- Area code: 870
- GNIS feature ID: 62353

Mount Olive is an unincorporated community in Ashley County, Arkansas, United States. Mount Olive is 12 miles (19 km) north-northeast of Hamburg.
