= KOUL =

Radio station in Agua Dulce, Texas

- Agua Dulce, Texas; United States
- Broadcast area: Corpus Christi, Texas
- Frequency: 107.7 MHz
- Branding: LA ISLA 107.7 & 95.9

Programming
- Format: Bilingual rhythmic CHR

Ownership
- Owner: Minerva R. Lopez
- Sister stations: KHMC

History
- First air date: February 6, 2006 (as KXTM Benavides)
- Former call signs: KAHL (1994, CP); KXTM (1994–2015)

Technical information
- Licensing authority: FCC
- Facility ID: 28074
- Class: C3
- ERP: 25,000 watts
- HAAT: 100 meters (330 ft)
- Transmitter coordinates: 27°46′35.00″N 97°55′10.00″W
- Translator: 93.5 K228XM (Corpus Christi)

Links
- Public license information: Public file; LMS
- Webcast: Listen Live

KOUL (107.7 FM) is a terrestrial radio station, broadcasting a Bilingual rhythmic CHR format. It is licensed to Agua Dulce, Texas, United States, and serves the Corpus Christi area. The station is owned by Minerva R. Lopez. KOUL is simulcast on FM translator K228XM at 95.9 MHz, licensed to Corpus Christi, Texas.

== History ==
On June 22, 2017 KOUL changed their format from country to contemporary hit radio, branded as "Power 103.3" (switching its translator to K277BL 103.3 FM Corpus Christi).

On March 8, 2018 KOUL changed their format from contemporary hit radio to variety hits, branded as "Shuffle 103.3". However, Shuffle was short-lived, as just a couple months later KOUL stopped using 103.3 (103.3 went to broadcasting KSIX 1230, which is co-owned with 103.3), while KOUL flipped to a Super Q 104.9 rebroadcast or something similar. Super Q 104.9, KMIQ is co-owned with KOUL.
