= XHNVG-FM =

Radio station in Nuevo Casas Grandes, Chihuahua, Mexico

- Nuevo Casas Grandes, Chihuahua; Mexico
- Frequency: 104.9 FM
- Branding: Euforia

Programming
- Format: Pop

Ownership
- Owner: JB Multimedia; (Eber Joel Beltrán Zamarrón)

History
- First air date: November 16, 1994 (concession)
- Call sign meaning: NueVo Casas Grandes

Technical information
- Licensing authority: CRT
- Class: B
- ERP: 49.65 kW
- HAAT: 116.7 m (383 ft)

Links
- Webcast: Listen live
- Website: gbmradio.com

XHNVG-FM is a radio station on 104.9 FM in Nuevo Casas Grandes, Chihuahua, Mexico. It is owned by JB Multimedia.

== History ==
XHNVG received its concession on November 16, 1994 and has maintained the same ownership throughout its history. The original concessionaire was Israel Beltrán Montes, who died in 2022.
