= WGPG-LP =

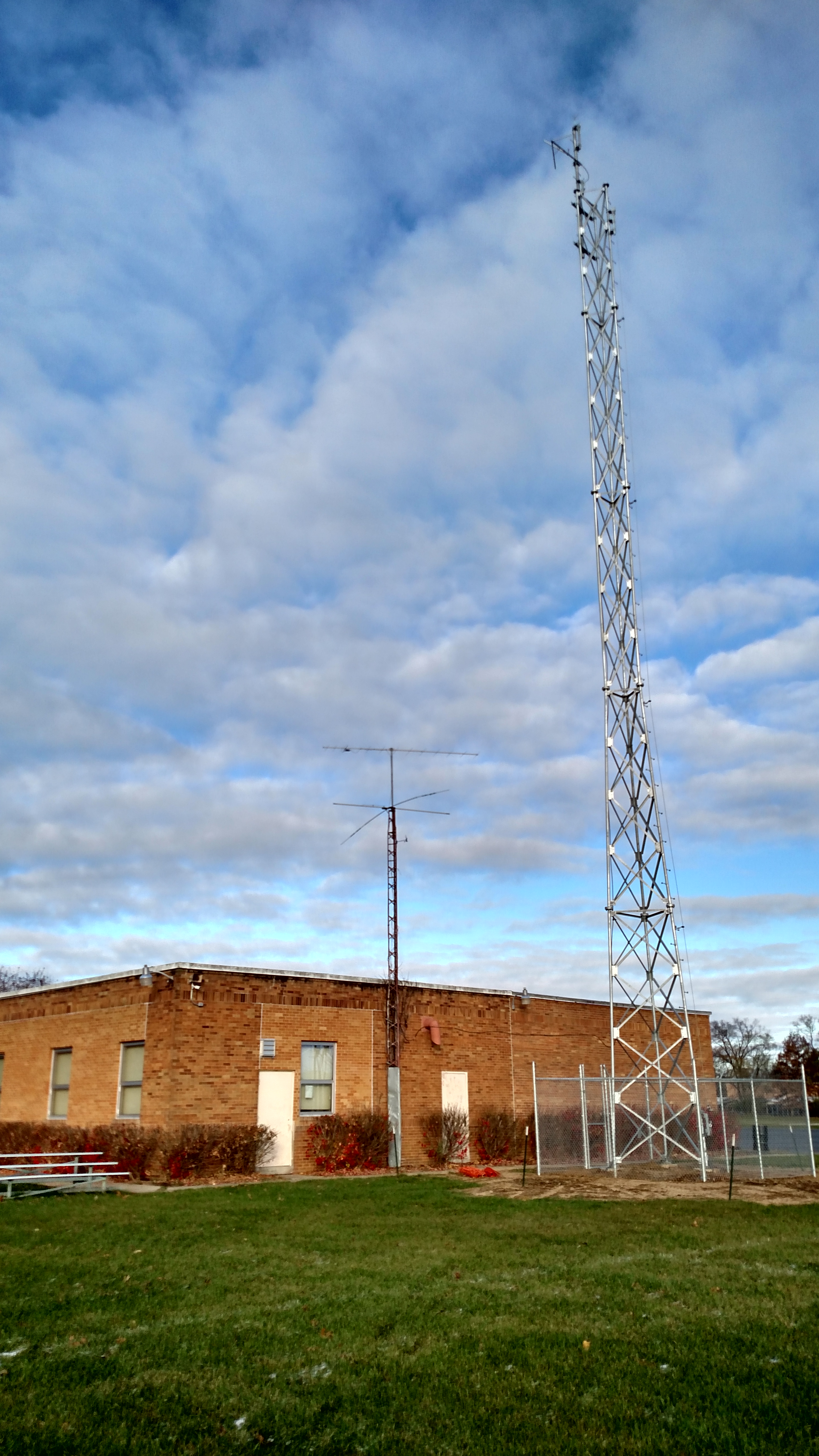
- Battle Creek, Michigan; United States
- Broadcast area
- Frequency: 92.9 MHz

Programming
- Format: Religious; Christian Talk
- Affiliations: LifeTalk Radio

Ownership
- Owner: Battle Creek Community Radio

History
- First air date: December 2016
- Call sign meaning: God's Perfect Grace

Technical information
- Licensing authority: FCC
- Class: L1
- ERP: 100 watts
- Transmitter coordinates: 42°20′03.1″N 85°12′23.6″W

Links
- Public license information: LMS
- Webcast: Listen Live
- Website: http://www.lifetalk.net/

WGPG-LP (92.9 FM) is a low power radio station broadcasting a religious radio format as an affiliate of LifeTalk Radio. Licensed June 23, 2016, to operate in Battle Creek, in the U.S. state of Michigan, it first began broadcasting in 2016 with transmitter located on the campus of Battle Creek Academy. It is licensed to Battle Creek Community Radio in Battle Creek, which was incorporated in 2013 "BATTLE CREEK COMMUNITY RADIO". Its tower height is 100 feet (30 m); its antenna type is a Nicom BKG77 non-directional, no beam tilt.

== History ==
WGPG is Battle Creeks first radio station specializing in a unique blend of locally sourced Christian music, gospel, and other music. Other local content includes live broadcast and recordings of local church services (Battle Creek Tabernacle and Urbandale SDA Church and other appropriate community events. The radio station also provides Burmese language programming geared to the growing Burmese immigrant population. Local programming is supplemented with network programming provided by LifeTalk Radio.

== Education ==
WGPG-LP is also utilized by the Battle Creek Academy as a teaching radio station, allowing Academy students the opportunity to learn, program, and become engaged in local radio.

== Sources ==
- Michigandb.com - BATTLE CREEK COMMUNITY RADIO
- FccInfo.com - WGPG FCC Data
