= Marais Saline Township, Ashley County, Arkansas =

Coordinates: 33.055°N 92.045°W

Marais Saline Township is a township in Ashley County, Arkansas, United States.

The name is of French origin meaning "salty pool".
