= WDLN-LP =

- Dunnellon, Florida; United States
- Frequency: 104.9 MHz

Ownership
- Owner: KKL Diversity Group

History
- First air date: January 15, 2014

Technical information
- Licensing authority: FCC
- Facility ID: 193436
- Class: L1
- ERP: 100 watts
- HAAT: 23 meters
- Transmitter coordinates: 29°03′1″N 82°27′39″W

Links
- Public license information: LMS
- Website: http://www.wdln.net/

WDLN-LP (104.9 FM) is a low power FM radio station that broadcasts from Dunnellon, Florida, United States.
