= KWSP-LP =

Coordinates: 30°03′51″N 99°08′16″W

- Kerrville, Texas; United States
- Frequency: 104.9 MHz
- Branding: Encore 104.9

Programming
- Format: Soft adult contemporary; Smooth jazz

Ownership
- Owner: Home Town Communications, Inc.

History
- First air date: 2004

Technical information
- Licensing authority: FCC
- Facility ID: 135266
- Class: L1
- ERP: 18 watts
- HAAT: 69.8 meters (229 ft)

Links
- Public license information: LMS
- Website: encoreradio.net

KWSP-LP (104.9 FM) is a radio station licensed to Kerrville, Texas. The station primarily broadcasts a soft adult contemporary format, with some Smooth Jazz mixed in, and is owned by Home Town Communications, Inc.
