= KREK =

- Bristow, Oklahoma; United States
- Frequency: 104.9 MHz
- Branding: SonLife Radio

Programming
- Format: Christian radio

Ownership
- Owner: Family Worship Center Church Inc.

History
- First air date: 1979

Technical information
- Licensing authority: FCC
- Facility ID: 5218
- Class: A
- ERP: 5,000 watts
- HAAT: 107 meters (351 ft)
- Transmitter coordinates: 35.78639°N 96.45972°W

Links
- Public license information: Public file; LMS
- Website: sonlifetv.com

KREK (104.9 FM) is a radio station licensed to Bristow, Oklahoma. It airs a Christian radio format and is owned by Family Worship Center Church Inc. The station airs programming from SonLife Radio, founded by televangelist Jimmy Swaggart.

== History ==
The station began broadcasting in 1979, and was owned by Big Chief Broadcasting Company of Bristow. It originally had an ERP of 3,000 watts and increased power to 5,000 watts in 1996. It had long aired a country music format, and was branded "Stereo Country 105".

In 2014, the station was sold to Family Worship Center Church for $250,000, and it adopted its current Christian radio format. It airs programmng from SonLife Radio, founded by televangelist Jimmy Swaggart.
