= WKKS-FM =

- Vanceburg, Kentucky; United States
- Frequency: 104.9 MHz

Programming
- Format: Adult contemporary

Ownership
- Owner: Brown Communications, Inc.
- Sister stations: WKKS (AM)

History
- First air date: 1983
- Former call signs: WITD (1981–1982)

Technical information
- Licensing authority: FCC
- Facility ID: 7317
- Class: A
- ERP: 3,000 watts
- HAAT: 91 meters
- Transmitter coordinates: 38°36′19″N 83°19′57″W

Links
- Public license information: Public file; LMS
- Website: wkksradio.com

WKKS-FM (104.9 FM) is a radio station broadcasting an adult contemporary format. Licensed to Vanceburg, Kentucky, United States. The station is currently owned by Brown Communications, Inc.

== History ==
The station went on the air as WITD on 1981-12-07. On 1982-07-16, the station changed its call sign to the current WKKS.
