= Bearhouse Township, Ashley County, Arkansas =

Bearhouse Township
- Township
- Location in Arkansas Bearhouse Township (the United States)
- Coordinates: 33°21′05″N 91°41′54″W
- Country: United States
- State: Arkansas
- County: Ashley

Area
  - Total: 44.280 sq mi (114.68 km^{2})
  - Land: 43.608 sq mi (112.94 km^{2})
  - Water: 0.672 sq mi (1.74 km^{2})
- Elevation: 157 ft (48 m)

Population (2010)
  - Total: 37
  - Density: 0.85/sq mi (0.33/km^{2})
- Time zone: UTC-6 (CST)
  - Summer (DST): UTC-5 (CDT)
- FIPS code: 05-90183
- GNIS ID: 78861

Bearhouse Township is a township in Ashley County, Arkansas, United States. Its total population was 37 as of the 2010 United States census, an increase of 15.63 percent from 32 at the 2000 census.

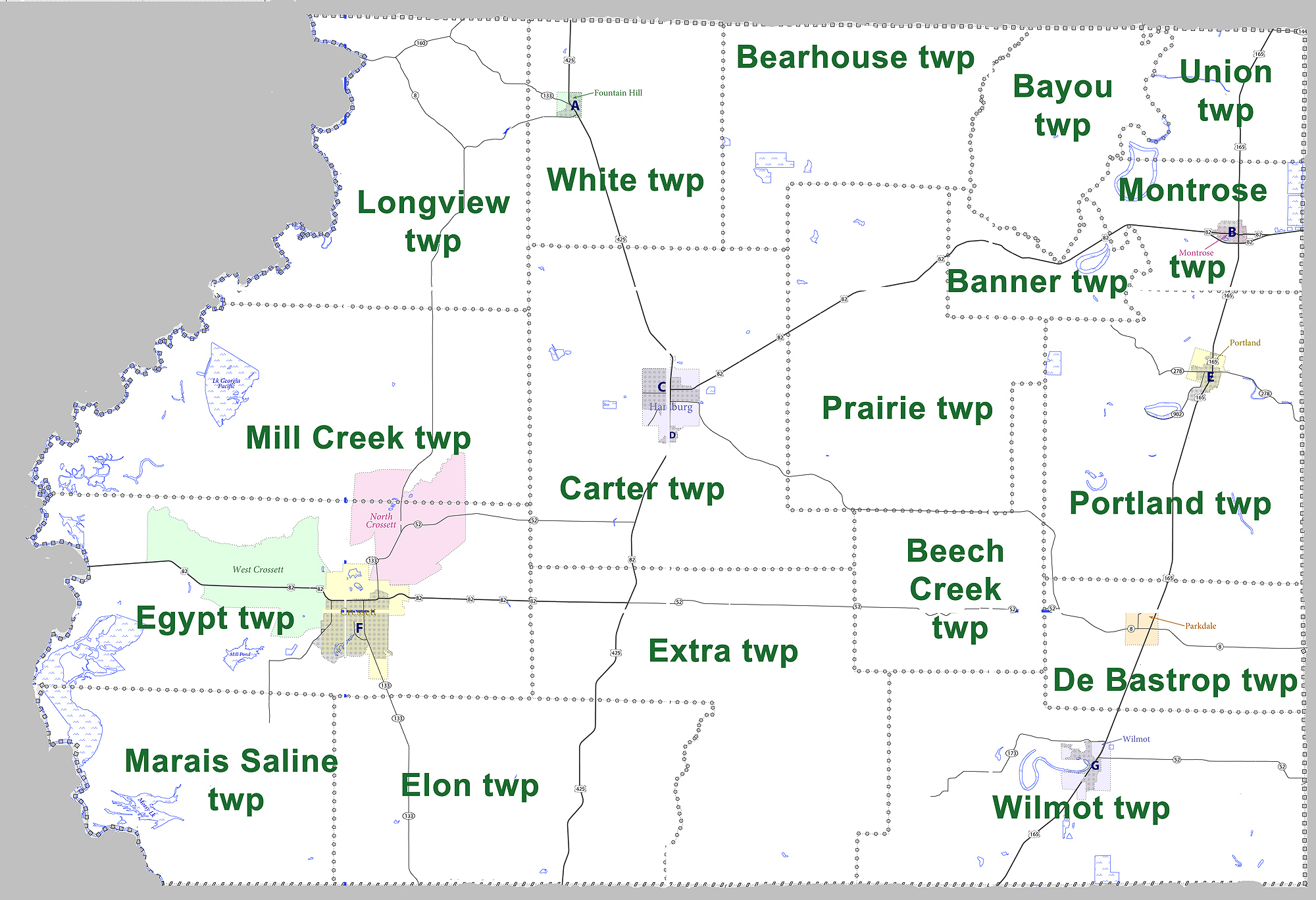
Townships in Ashley County as of 2010

According to the 2010 Census, Bearhouse Township is located at 33°21′05″N 91°41′54″W (33.351318, -91.698276). It has a total area of 44.280 square miles (114.68 square kilometers), of which 43.608 sq mi (112.94 km^{2}) is land and 0.672 sq mi (1.74 km^{2}) is water (1.52%). As per the USGS National Elevation Dataset, the elevation is 157 feet (48 m).
