= Ringwood, Oklahoma =

- Town
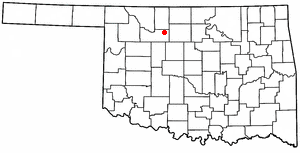
- Location in Oklahoma
- Coordinates: 36°22′48″N 98°14′31″W
- Country: United States
- State: Oklahoma
- County: Major

Area
  - Total: 0.83 sq mi (2.15 km^{2})
  - Land: 0.83 sq mi (2.15 km^{2})
  - Water: 0 sq mi (0.00 km^{2})
- Elevation: 1,322 ft (403 m)

Population (2020)
  - Total: 401
  - Density: 482.3/sq mi (186.23/km^{2})
- Time zone: UTC-6 (Central (CST))
  - Summer (DST): UTC-5 (CDT)
- ZIP Code: 73768
- Area code: 580
- FIPS code: 40-63450
- GNIS feature ID: 2412553
- Website: townofringwood.municipalimpact.com

Ringwood is a town in Major County, Oklahoma, United States. The population was 401 at the 2020 census, down from 497 in 2010. The town was given its name because it was once ringed by woods from northwest to southeast.

== Geography ==
Ringwood is in eastern Major County, 18 miles (29 km) northeast of Fairview, the county seat, and 21 miles (34 km) west of Enid. Combined U.S. Routes 60 and 412 run east-west along the northern border of the town, leading east to Enid, while Oklahoma State Highway 58 runs along the western border, leading southwest to Fairview.

According to the U.S. Census Bureau, the town of Ringwood has a total area of 0.83 square miles (2.15 km^{2}), of which 0.001 square miles (0.003 km^{2}), or 0.12%, are water. Indian Creek crosses the northwest corner of the town, flowing south to join the Cimarron River northeast of Fairview.

== Demographics ==
Historical population
Census	Pop.	Note	%±
1910	271		—
1920	225		−17.0%
1930	265		17.8%
1940	288		8.7%
1950	331		14.9%
1960	232		−29.9%
1970	241		3.9%
1980	389		61.4%
1990	394		1.3%
2000	424		7.6%
2010	497		17.2%
2020	401		−19.3%
U.S. Decennial Census

=== 2020 census ===
As of the 2020 census, Ringwood had a population of 401. The median age was 35.5 years. 27.4% of residents were under the age of 18 and 15.5% of residents were 65 years of age or older. For every 100 females there were 104.6 males, and for every 100 females age 18 and over there were 87.7 males age 18 and over.

0.0% of residents lived in urban areas, while 100.0% lived in rural areas.

There were 151 households in Ringwood, of which 47.7% had children under the age of 18 living in them. Of all households, 53.6% were married-couple households, 16.6% were households with a male householder and no spouse or partner present, and 27.2% were households with a female householder and no spouse or partner present. About 21.2% of all households were made up of individuals and 13.3% had someone living alone who was 65 years of age or older.

There were 164 housing units, of which 7.9% were vacant. The homeowner vacancy rate was 1.6% and the rental vacancy rate was 6.3%.

Racial composition as of the 2020 census
Race	Number	Percent
White	178	44.4%
Black or African American	0	0.0%
American Indian and Alaska Native	12	3.0%
Asian	1	0.2%
Native Hawaiian and Other Pacific Islander	0	0.0%
Some other race	72	18.0%
Two or more races	138	34.4%
Hispanic or Latino (of any race)	214	53.4%

=== 2000 census ===
As of the census of 2000, there were 424 people, 160 households, and 120 families residing in the city. The population density was 487.0 inhabitants per square mile (188.0/km^{2}). There were 172 housing units at an average density of 197.6 per square mile (76.3/km^{2}). The racial makeup of the city was 70.99% White, 0.24% African American, 27.12% from other races, and 1.65% from two or more races.

There were 160 households, out of which 35.6% had children under the age of 18 living with them, 62.5% were married couples living together, 4.4% had a female householder with no husband present, and 25.0% were non-families. 23.1% of all households were made up of individuals, and 15.6% had someone living alone who was 65 years of age or older. The average household size was 2.65 and the average family size was 3.13.

In the city the population was spread out, with 29.7% under the age of 18, 8.5% from 18 to 24, 25.9% from 25 to 44, 18.6% from 45 to 64, and 17.2% who were 65 years of age or older. The median age was 35 years. For every 100 females, there were 104.8 males. For every 100 females age 18 and over, there were 98.7 males.

The median income for a household in the city was $30,000, and the median income for a family was $40,250. Males had a median income of $26,250 versus $18,750 for females. The per capita income for the city was $15,809. About 19.2% of families and 22.1% of the population were below the poverty line, including 30.4% of those under age 18 and 16.4% of those age 65 or over.

== Notable residents ==
- Isai Rodriguez (born 1998) - American long-distance runner
