= Bayou Township, Ashley County, Arkansas =

Bayou Township
- Township
- Location in Arkansas Bayou Township (the United States)
- Coordinates: 33°20′58″N 91°35′13″W
- Country: United States
- State: Arkansas
- County: Ashley

Area
  - Total: 29.208 sq mi (75.65 km^{2})
  - Land: 29.130 sq mi (75.45 km^{2})
  - Water: 0.078 sq mi (0.20 km^{2})
- Elevation: 171 ft (52 m)

Population (2010)
  - Total: 55
  - Density: 1.9/sq mi (0.73/km^{2})
- Time zone: UTC-6 (CST)
  - Summer (DST): UTC-5 (CDT)
- FIPS code: 05-90162
- GNIS ID: 63672

Bayou Township is a township in Ashley County, Arkansas, United States. Its population was 55 at the 2010 United States census, a decrease of 5.17 percent from 58 at the 2000 census.

According to the 2010 Census, Bayou Township is located at 33°20′58″N 91°35′13″W (33.349358, -91.586808). It has a total area of 29.208 square miles (75.65 square kilometers), of which 29.130 sq mi (75.45 km^{2}) is land and 0.078 sq mi (0.20 km^{2}) is water (0.27%). As per the USGS National Elevation Dataset, the elevation is 171 feet (52 m).

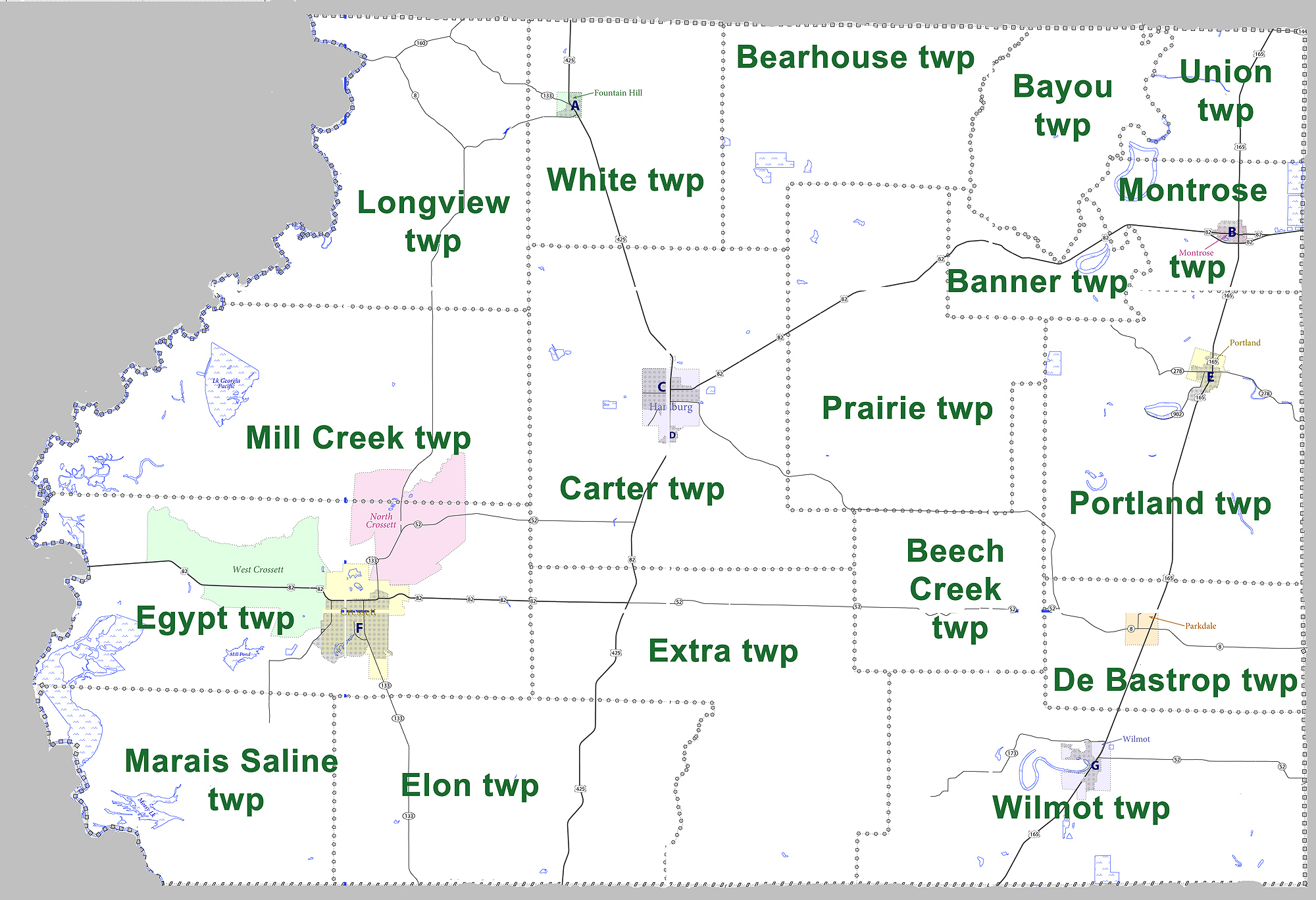
Townships in Ashley County in 2010
