= Sunshine, Ashley County, Arkansas =

Sunshine, Arkansas
- Unincorporated community
- Sunshine's position in Arkansas. Sunshine, Arkansas (the United States)
- Coordinates: 33°11′13″N 91°31′46″W
- Country: United States
- State: Arkansas
- County: Ashley
- Elevation: 115 ft (35 m)
- Time zone: UTC-6 (Central (CST))
  - Summer (DST): UTC-5 (CDT)
- GNIS feature ID: 57200

Sunshine is an unincorporated community in Ashley County, Arkansas, United States. The community is located along U.S. Route 165 and earlier the Missouri Pacific Railroad.
