= WSKV-FM =

Music radio station in Kentucky, US

- Stanton, Kentucky; United States
- Broadcast area: Eastern/Central Kentucky - Red River Gorge
- Frequency: 104.9 MHz
- Branding: Pickup Country

Programming
- Format: Full service Country

Ownership
- Owner: Moore Country 104, LLC

History
- First air date: August 10, 1974; 51 years ago

Technical information
- Licensing authority: FCC
- Facility ID: 51694
- Class: A
- ERP: 720 watts
- HAAT: 207 meters
- Transmitter coordinates: 37°45′43″N 83°50′36″W

Links
- Public license information: Public file; LMS
- Webcast: listen Live
- Website: listenlikealocal.com

WSKV-FM (104.9 FM, "Pickup Country") is a radio station broadcasting a full-service country music format licensed to Stanton, Kentucky, United States. Pickup Country operates Studios in both Stanton, Kentucky and Irvine, Kentucky. The station is owned by Moore Country 104, LLC.

== History ==
The Federal Communications Commission granted a construction permit to the Red River Gorge Broadcasting Company for a new FM station in Stanton on December 21, 1973. WSKV went on the air August 10, 1974, with a hybrid format of country and pop music.
