= WWKC =

Coordinates: 39.813°N 81.610°W

- Caldwell, Ohio; United States
- Frequency: 104.9 MHz
- Branding: KC105

Programming
- Format: Country

Ownership
- Owner: Joel Losego; (AVC Communications, Inc.)

History
- First air date: 1991
- Former call signs: WNQV (1986–1989, CP)

Technical information
- Licensing authority: FCC
- Facility ID: 70554
- Class: A
- ERP: 3,000 watts
- HAAT: 100 meters

Links
- Public license information: Public file; LMS
- Webcast: Listen Live
- Website: WWKC Online

WWKC (104.9 FM) is a country music radio station outside Caldwell, Ohio, licensed to AVC Communications, Inc. The station broadcasts with a power of 3,000 Watts and is known as "KC105" to listeners. KC105 has been using the call sign WWKC since 1989. Before then, it used the call sign WNQV.
