= KHUH-LP =

- Seattle, Washington; United States
- Broadcast area: Eastlake, South Lake Union, Queen Anne neighborhoods of Seattle
- Frequency: 104.9 MHz
- Branding: Hollow Earth Radio

Programming
- Format: Freeform; Variety

Ownership
- Owner: Hollow Earth Radio

History
- First air date: September 20, 2017
- Former call signs: KGUT-LP (2014–2015)

Technical information
- Licensing authority: FCC
- Facility ID: 195500
- Class: L1
- Power: 15 watts
- HAAT: 78 meters (256 ft)

Links
- Public license information: LMS
- Webcast: Listen live
- Website: khuh.fm

KHUH-LP is a Free-form and Variety formatted broadcast radio station. The station is licensed to Seattle, Washington and serving the Eastlake, South Lake Union, and Queen Anne neighborhoods of Seattle in Washington. KHUH-LP is owned and operated by Hollow Earth Radio.

== History ==
Hollow Earth Radio was launched on January 1, 2007, as a community-based Internet radio station, operating from the attic of co-founders Amber Kai Morgan and Garrett Kelly. After establishing itself within the Seattle music community, the station was approved for an LPFM broadcast license by the FCC in 2014, and after a successful fundraising campaign began broadcasting at 104.9 FM on September 20, 2017, transmitting from the station's studios at 2018a East Union Street in Seattle's Cherry Hill neighborhood.

In 2021, The Wire named Hollow Earth Radio one of its "100 essential stations and programmes" in its July Radio Activity issue, the only broadcaster in the Pacific Northwest to receive that distinction. That same year, Hollow Earth Radio was voted "Best Seattle Radio Station" by Seattle Gay News.

In early 2022, Hollow Earth Radio announced that it had vacated its studio space in Seattle's Central District, and was actively looking for a new space for studio production and event hosting.

As of September 2023, Hollow Earth Radio has moved into the renovated Black Lodge space in the Eastlake neighbourhood of Seattle.

== Programming ==
KHUH-LP describes its programming as "a forum for underrepresented music, sounds and perspectives" and "local music, found sound, paranormal encounters, crank calls, dreams, etc."

In May 2018, Hollow Earth Radio played host to some of the interviews that were featured in the KING5 series "Priced Out", which "chronicl[ed] the rising cost of living in Seattle and its impact on middle class families", along with longtime businesses.

Notable programs include Urban Mutant Radio, hosted by DJ BLeeK and featuring independent rock and alternative musicians, Radio Eclectus, an avant-garde music program hosted by Michael Schell, and dead rat-titude, hosted by the students of Nova High School and featuring a wide variety of topics from live in-studio performances to conversations about pop culture.
