= WRBF =

Coordinates: 34°20′35″N 85°02′20″W

- Plainville, Georgia; United States
- Broadcast area: Rome, Georgia; Calhoun, Georgia
- Frequency: 104.9 MHz
- Branding: 104.9 The Rebel

Programming
- Format: Classic rock

Ownership
- Owner: Howard C. Toole and Merry Toole; (H.C. Toole, LLC)

History
- First air date: 2011

Technical information
- Licensing authority: FCC
- Facility ID: 171028
- Class: A
- ERP: 950 watts
- HAAT: 184.8 meters (606 ft)

Links
- Public license information: Public file; LMS
- Webcast: Listen live
- Website: 1049therebel.com

WRBF is a radio station airing a classic rock format licensed to Plainville, Georgia, broadcasting on 104.9 FM. The station serves the areas of Rome, Georgia and Calhoun, Georgia, and is owned by Howard C. Toole and Merry Toole, through licensee H.C. Toole, LLC.
