= WXKW (FM) =

- Key West, Florida; United States
- Frequency: 104.9 MHz
- Branding: 104.9 The X

Programming
- Format: Adult hits

Ownership
- Owner: James Day and Kevin Redding; (Sunny Days Radio, LLC)

History
- First air date: 2010

Technical information
- Licensing authority: FCC
- Facility ID: 170942
- Class: A
- ERP: 1,000 watts
- HAAT: 51 meters (167 ft)
- Transmitter coordinates: 24°33′20″N 81°48′04″W

Links
- Public license information: Public file; LMS
- Webcast: Listen live
- Website: xkeywest.com

WXKW is an adult hits radio station licensed to Key West, Florida, broadcasting on 104.9 FM. WXKW is owned by James Day and Kevin Redding, through licensee Sunny Days Radio, LLC.
