= WIHS =

- Middletown, Connecticut; United States
- Broadcast area: Greater Hartford
- Frequency: 104.9 MHz
- Branding: WIHS-FM 104.9 Christian Radio

Programming
- Format: Christian radio
- Affiliations: Salem Radio Network

Ownership
- Owner: Connecticut Radio Fellowship, Inc.

History
- First air date: October 11, 1969
- Call sign meaning: We're in His Service; "IHS", an initialism for the Christogram

Technical information
- Licensing authority: FCC
- Facility ID: 13634
- Class: A
- ERP: 3,100 watts
- HAAT: 96 meters (315 ft)
- Transmitter coordinates: 41°30′18.3″N 72°39′30.3″W

Links
- Public license information: Public file; LMS
- Webcast: Listen live
- Website: www.wihsradio.org

WIHS (104.9 FM) is a radio station broadcasting a Christian radio format. Licensed to Middletown, Connecticut, United States, the station serves the Hartford area. The station is owned by Connecticut Radio Fellowship, Inc. and features programming from Salem Radio Network.

WIHS is a ministry of the Connecticut Radio Fellowship, broadcasting music, local and national Christian programs. WIHS is non-commercial, 100% listener supported, and has been broadcasting Christian programs since 1969.

The call sign WIHS-TV was used from 1964 to 1966 by the Archdiocese of Boston on UHF Channel 38; that station is now WSBK-TV.
