= WVDV-LP =

- Sebring, Florida; United States
- Frequency: 104.9 MHz
- Branding: Radio Voz De La Verdad

Programming
- Language: Spanish
- Format: Religious

Ownership
- Owner: Highlands County Community Broadcasting, Inc.

History
- First air date: 2014-08-26

Technical information
- Licensing authority: FCC
- Facility ID: 134104
- Class: L1
- ERP: 72 watts
- HAAT: 26.9 meters (88 ft)
- Transmitter coordinates: 27°32′25″N 81°30′14″W

Links
- Public license information: LMS
- Website: voiceoftruthradio.org

WVDV-LP (104.9 FM, "Radio Voz De La Verdad") is a radio station broadcasting a religious format. Licensed to Sebring, Florida, United States, the station is currently owned by Highlands County Community Broadcasting, Inc.
