= KAGH (AM) =

- Crossett, Arkansas; United States
- Frequency: 800 kHz
- Branding: Oldies Radio 800

Programming
- Format: Oldies
- Affiliations: Westwood One

Ownership
- Owner: Crossett Radio; (Ashley County Broadcasters, Inc.)
- Sister stations: KAGH-FM, KWLT

History
- First air date: 1951

Technical information
- Licensing authority: FCC
- Facility ID: 2937
- Class: D
- Power: 240 watts (daytime only)
- Transmitter coordinates: 33°08′05″N 91°56′49″W

Links
- Public license information: Public file; LMS
- Website: KAGH Online

KAGH (800 AM, "Oldies Radio 800") is a radio station licensed to serve Crossett, Arkansas, United States The station is owned by Crossett Radio and licensed to Peggy S. Medlin's Ashley County Broadcasters, Inc.

The station airs an oldies music format. Most of the station's programming comes from the satellite-delivered Classic Hits service of Westwood One.

The station was assigned the KAGH call letters by the Federal Communications Commission.

== History of call letters ==
The call letters KAGH were previously assigned to an AM station in Pasadena, California. It began broadcasting July 22, 1948, on 1300 kHz with 1 KW power (daytime).
