= CKRE-FM =

Coordinates: 53°22′08″N 106°55′52″W

- Ahtahkakoop First Nation, Saskatchewan; Canada
- Frequency: 104.9 MHz

Programming
- Format: community radio

Ownership
- Owner: Larry Ahenakew

History
- First air date: November 2006

Technical information
- Class: LP
- ERP: 48 watts vertical polarization only
- HAAT: 1.1 meters

CKRE-FM is a community radio station that broadcasts at 104.9 FM in Ahtahkakoop First Nation, Saskatchewan, Canada.

The station is owned by Larry Ahenakew.

The CKRE callsign was used by a former radio station in Red Lake, Ontario. CKRE began broadcasting November 2006 by DJ Gerald Greyeyes.
