= CKTR-FM =

Former radio station in North Bay, Ontario

Coordinates: 46°18′40″N 79°27′41″W

- North Bay, Ontario; Canada
- Frequency: 104.9 MHz
- Branding: North Bay Radio 104.9

Programming
- Format: tourist information/community radio

Ownership
- Owner: 1311831 Ontario Limited

History
- First air date: 1999
- Last air date: Between 2010 and 2013

Technical information
- Class: LP
- ERP: 50 watts
- HAAT: 13.7 metres (45 ft)

CKTR-FM was a radio station broadcasting at 104.9 FM in North Bay, Ontario, Canada. Originally a tourist information station, the station later evolved toward a community radio format, airing programs produced by a variety of commercial and community groups, including the local chamber of commerce, real estate and financial planning agents, health and wellness consultants, sports and recreational clubs and students from Nipissing University.

== History ==
On July 16, 1999, 1311831 Ontario Limited received approval from the Canadian Radio-television and Telecommunications Commission to operate a new English language FM tourist information radio station to serve North Bay at 104.9 MHz. The station either signed on later the same year or in 2000.

On August 8, 2000, 1311831 Ontario Limited was granted a licence amendment to allow CKTR-FM to offer 10 hours of live broadcasting each week.

In 2004, the CRTC approved a change in ownership and effective control of 1311831 Ontario Limited. The company was now equally owned by Christopher Thompson, Steven M. Dreany and Timothy Bertrand.

On May 25, 2005, 1311831 Ontario Limited received CRTC approval to increase CKTR-FM's effective radiated power from 31 watts to 50 watts and to relocate the transmitter.

On June 5, 2006, the CRTC renewed CKTR-FM's licence from September 1, 2006 to August 31, 2013. The station is currently off the air. A new Facebook page for North Bay Radio - FM 104.9 was launched in January 2010 but hasn't been updated since March of that same year. As well the station's website is offline.
