= KEEH =

- Spokane, Washington; United States
- Broadcast area: Spokane metropolitan area
- Frequency: 104.9 MHz (HD Radio)
- Branding: Shine 104.9

Programming
- Format: Contemporary Christian
- Subchannels: HD2: Christian talk and teaching "Life Talk"; HD3: Christmas music (Nov-Jan)

Ownership
- Owner: Upper Columbia Media Association
- Sister stations: KHBA-LD

History
- First air date: 1991
- Former call signs: KAAR (1991–1993)
- Former frequencies: 95.3 MHz (1991); 104.7 MHz (1991–2004)

Technical information
- Licensing authority: FCC
- Facility ID: 63876
- Class: C1
- ERP: 10,500 watts
- HAAT: 472 meters (1,549 ft)
- Transmitter coordinates: 47.579°N 117.299°W
- Translator: 94.9 K235CP (Coeur d'Alene)

Links
- Public license information: Public file; LMS
- Webcast: Listen Live
- Website: shine1049.org

KEEH (104.9 MHz) is a non-profit FM radio station in Spokane, Washington, known as "Shine 104.9." It broadcasts a Contemporary Christian radio format and is owned by the Upper Columbia Media Association, with its offices and radio studios on South Grove Road.

KEEH has an effective radiated power (ERP) of 10,500 watts. KEEH broadcasts using HD Radio technology. Its digital subchannel, KEEH-HD2, carries a Christian talk and teaching service known as "Life Talk." KEEH's Christian Contemporary format is also heard on full-power satellite KKEH at 91.7 MHz in Ponderay, Idaho (serving Sandpoint) and FM translator K235CP at 94.9 MHz in Coeur d'Alene, Idaho.

== History ==
KEEH began broadcasting in 1991 as KAAR at 95.3 FM. That station switched its oldies format to contemporary Christian music and moved its frequency to 104.7 on July 1, 1991. In 1993 the station moved to 104.7 MHz as KEEH with 320 watts, as Positive Life Radio, and moved to its current frequency in 2004, along with a significant power upgrade. More recently, a translator signal was added at 94.9 FM which broadcasts to portions of the Idaho side of the market shielded by the main signal, as well as a full power station in Sandpoint at 91.7.
