= KAGH-FM =

- Crossett, Arkansas; United States
- Frequency: 104.9 MHz
- Branding: Today's Country 104.9

Programming
- Format: Country
- Affiliations: CBS News Radio

Ownership
- Owner: Crossett Radio; (Ashley County Broadcasters, Inc.)
- Sister stations: KAGH (AM), KWLT

History
- First air date: March 16, 1967

Technical information
- Licensing authority: FCC
- Facility ID: 2936
- Class: A
- ERP: 6,000 watts
- HAAT: 100 meters (330 feet)
- Transmitter coordinates: 33°08′05″N 91°56′49″W

Links
- Public license information: Public file; LMS
- Website: KAGH-FM Online

KAGH-FM (104.9 MHz, "Today's Country 104.9") is a radio station licensed to serve Crossett, Arkansas, United States. The station is owned by Crossett Radio and licensed to Peggy S. Medlin's Ashley County Broadcasters, Inc.

The station airs a country music format. In addition to its usual music programming, KAGH-FM also airs St. Louis Cardinals baseball games and Arkansas Razorbacks football games.

The station was assigned the KAGH-FM call letters by the Federal Communications Commission on March 16, 1967 according to the Northwest Arkansas Times.

Former logo
