= WKKS (AM) =

Radio station in Vanceburg, Kentucky

- Vanceburg, Kentucky; United States
- Frequency: 1570 kHz
- Branding: Kickin Country

Programming
- Format: Country music

Ownership
- Owner: Brown Communications, Inc.

Technical information
- Licensing authority: FCC
- Facility ID: 7319
- Class: D
- Power: 1,000 watts day
- Transmitter coordinates: 38°35′50″N 83°20′50″W

Links
- Public license information: Public file; LMS
- Webcast: no

WKKS (1570 AM) is a radio station broadcasting a country music format. It is licensed to Vanceburg, Kentucky, United States. The station is currently owned by Brown Communications, Inc.

WKKS 1570 AM plays classic country from the 1960s through the early 1990s. Common played stars include Ronnie Milsap, Waylon Jennings, Willie Nelson, Johnny Cash, Merle Haggard, Dan Seals, George Jones, Don Williams, Bellamy Brothers, and many other hits throughout that time period. The station focus is on country from the past and no newly released songs can be found there.
