= WPXN (FM) =

- Paxton, Illinois; United States
- Broadcast area: Champaign, Illinois
- Frequency: 104.9 MHz
- Branding: 104.9 WPXN

Programming
- Format: Adult contemporary
- Affiliations: Fox News Radio

Ownership
- Owner: Paxton Broadcasting Corporation

History
- First air date: 1984
- Former call signs: WOKO (1983−1984)
- Call sign meaning: Paxton

Technical information
- Licensing authority: FCC
- Facility ID: 51989
- Class: A
- ERP: 3,000 watts
- HAAT: 91 meters (299 ft)
- Transmitter coordinates: 40°27′11.1″N 88°6′11.1″W

Links
- Public license information: Public file; LMS
- Website: www.wpxnradio.com

WPXN (104.9 FM) is a radio station broadcasting an adult contemporary music format. Licensed to Paxton, Illinois, United States, the station serves the Champaign area. The station is owned by Paxton Broadcasting Corporation and features programming from Fox News Radio.

WPXN is the home of local high school sporting events, as well as the Illinois Fighting Illini and NASCAR.

In June 2020 WPXN installed a new broadcasting tower and returned to its full licensed power of 3,000 watts after months of broadcasting at a reduced power of 250 watts because of structural issues with the old broadcasting tower.
