= LifeTalk Radio =

American Christian radio network

- Type: Radio network
- Country: United States
- Branding: LifeTalk Radio

Ownership
- Owner: The North American Division of the Seventh-day Adventist Church

History
- Launch date: March 1992

Coverage
- Availability: International, through broadcast stations and translators

Links
- Webcast: Main Stream: Listen Live; Kids Stream: Listen Kids; Music: Listen Music
- Website: lifetalk.net

LifeTalk Radio is a network of over 200 radio stations featuring Christian music, Christian talk and teaching, and other religious programming. Its headquarters are in Riverside, California. LifeTalk Radio is the only radio network owned by the North American Division of the Seventh-day Adventist Church, and is a ministry of the Adventist Media Center.

== History ==
In 1991, LifeTalk Radio was founded by Paul Moore, in Yakima, Washington. In 2000, the network's headquarters moved to Vonore, Tennessee. In October 2001, Moore was given the Society of Adventist Communicators' "Award of Pioneering Innovation" for creating the network. In 2002, Moore retired as president of LifeTalk Radio, and was replaced by Phil Follett. On July 15, 2004, Steven Gallimore became president of LifeTalk Radio, and the network moved its headquarters to Collegedale, Tennessee later that year. In 2011, LifeTalk Radio moved its headquarters to Simi Valley, California. By 2015, the network's headquarters had been moved to Riverside, California.

LifeTalk Radio's first radio station, KSOH in Yakima, Washington, began broadcasting in March 1992. The station was launched with an "interactive talk radio" format, airing Christian talk programming. In 1996, LifeTalk Radio purchased and launched several additional stations. In 2000, the network was heard on 15 stations, 8 of which were owned by the network. By 2004, LifeTalk Radio was airing on 35 stations, by 2005 it was airing on 65 stations, and by 2008 the network was airing on 70 stations. By 2015, the network was airing on over 100 stations.

== Stations ==
LifeTalk Radio is heard on over 73 full-time and part-time affiliates in the United States, along with 122 additional affiliates internationally. LifeTalk Radio also streams through Roku.

=== Owned and operated stations ===
United States
Call sign	Frequency	City of license	State	Facility ID
KUDU	91.9 FM	Tok	Alaska	76851
KSVA	920 AM	Albuquerque	New Mexico	11230
WBLC	1360 AM	Lenoir City	Tennessee	36691
KCSH	88.9 FM	Ellensburg	Washington	81756
KSOH	89.5 FM	Yakima	Washington	10023

==== Translators ====
Call sign	Frequency (MHz)	City of license	State	Facility ID
W217AW	91.3	Dalton	Georgia	90196
K282CD	104.3	Los Lunas	New Mexico	202798
K220GX	91.9	The Dalles	Oregon	91144
K217EI	91.3	Scio	Oregon	93023
W220CO	91.9	Carbondale	Pennsylvania	91847
W253BO	98.5	Collegedale	Tennessee	140306
W236DA	95.1	Lenoir City	Tennessee	157012

=== Fulltime affiliates ===
United States
Call sign	Frequency	City of license	State
WYFR-LP	89.9 FM	Fairhope	Alabama
KQQS	89.3 FM	Sitka	Alaska
KPGC-LP	95.1 FM	Norman	Arkansas
KWOL-LP	103.7 FM	Arroyo Grande	California
KXFB-LP	99.5 FM	Fallbrook	California
KRGR-LP	101.3 FM	Paradise	California
WSDX-LP	101.9 FM	Brandon	Florida
WSRD-LP	93.1 FM	Albany	Georgia
WLOJ-LP	102.9 FM	Calhoun	Georgia
WYAW-LP	93.5 FM	Savannah	Georgia
KOTF-LP	97.5 FM	Hayden	Idaho
KQFR	90.7 FM	Moyie Springs	Idaho
WLSE	103.3 FM	Canton	Illinois
WWTG	88.1 FM	Carpentersville	Illinois
WSHI-LP	98.5 FM	Shelbyville	Indiana
KSDH-LP	100.1 FM	Great Bend	Kansas
KBFA-LP	95.7 FM	West Monroe	Louisiana
WGPG-LP	92.9 FM	Battle Creek	Michigan
WSFT-LP	105.5 FM	Berrien Springs	Michigan
WYNJ	89.5 FM	Blackduck	Minnesota
WHPJ	88.7 FM	Hibbing	Minnesota
WYSG-LP	96.3 FM	Hinckley	Minnesota
KPJT-LP	99.1 FM	Maple Grove	Minnesota
KOPJ	89.3 FM	Sebeka	Minnesota
KOLJ-FM	91.1 FM	Wannaska	Minnesota
KLHW-LP	90.5 FM	Kansas City	Missouri
KHCI-LP	104.1 FM	Moberly	Missouri
KSLN-LP	95.9 FM	Sullivan	Missouri
KETI-LP	95.7 FM	Choteau	Montana
KANB-LP	102.3 FM	Kalispell	Montana
KWLY-LP	104.9 FM	Missoula	Montana
WLWM-LP	105.7 FM	Charlestown	New Hampshire
WBLN-LP	104.9 FM	Glens Falls	New York
WKHV-LP	103.9 FM	Kingston	New York
KTWJ	90.9 FM	Bismarck	North Dakota
KSAF-LP	104.1 FM	Minot	North Dakota
KLYF-LP	100.7 FM	Coquille	Oregon
KGEL-LP	92.5 FM	Jasper	Oregon
KFYL-LP	94.3 FM	La Grande	Oregon
KMAB-LP	99.3 FM	Madras	Oregon
KGLS-LP	99.1 FM	Tillamook	Oregon
WOLR-LP	98.9 FM	Williamsport	Pennsylvania
WYEJ-LP	106.7 FM	Anderson	South Carolina
WJNU-LP	97.5 FM	Cookeville	Tennessee
WDNX	89.1 FM	Savannah	Tennessee
KJHV-LP	96.3 FM	Killeen	Texas
KVBM-LP	104.7 FM	Killeen	Texas
WXTR	89.9 FM	Tappahannock	Virginia
KTFJ-LP	104.7 FM	Burlington	Washington
KEIT-LP	100.7 FM	Colville	Washington
KEEH (HD2)	104.9 FM	Spokane	Washington
KLRF	88.5 FM	Walla Walla	Washington
WPGR-LP	105.7 FM	Clear Lake	Wisconsin

==== Translators ====
Call sign	Frequency (MHz)	City of license	State	Facility ID
W250BK	97.9	Chatsworth	Georgia	141703
K209FH	89.7	Grangeville	Idaho	140898
W282BS	104.3	Dunlap	Illinois	141895
K228EW	93.5	Bemidji	Minnesota	144466
W284CO	104.7	Asheville	North Carolina	156080
K223CV	92.5 FM	Albany	Oregon	141709
W288DC	105.5 FM	Columbia	Tennessee	141179
W234AW	94.7	Pulaski	Tennessee	141167
