= KMIQ =

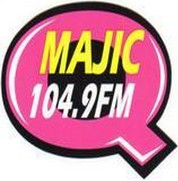

Robstown, Texas; United States
- Broadcast area: Corpus Christi
- Frequency: 104.9 MHz
- Branding: Majic 104.9

Programming
- Format: Tejano

Ownership
- Owner: Cotton Broadcasting

History
- First air date: July 23, 1989

Technical information
- Licensing authority: FCC
- Facility ID: 14019
- Class: C2
- ERP: 31 kilowatts
- HAAT: 147 meters (482 ft)
- Transmitter coordinates: 27°46′35″N 97°55′10″W

Links
- Public license information: Public file; LMS
- Website: www.ustream.tv/channel/majic-104-9

KMIQ (104.9 FM, Super Q 104.9) is a radio station broadcasting a tejano music format. Licensed to Robstown, Texas, United States, the station serves the Corpus Christi area. The station is currently owned by Cotton Broadcasting.
