= KWLT =

- North Crossett, Arkansas; United States
- Broadcast area: Crossett, Arkansas
- Frequency: 102.7 MHz
- Branding: The Rock 102.7

Programming
- Format: Mainstream rock

Ownership
- Owner: Southark Broadcasters, Inc.

Technical information
- Licensing authority: FCC
- Facility ID: 60917
- Class: C3
- ERP: 25,000 watts
- HAAT: 100 meters (330 ft)
- Transmitter coordinates: 33°08′03″N 91°56′47″W

Links
- Public license information: Public file; LMS
- Website: crossettradio.com/therock1027/index.html

KWLT is a radio station airing a mainstream rock format licensed to North Crossett, Arkansas, broadcasting on 102.7 FM. The station is owned by Southark Broadcasters, Inc.
