= Crossett High School =

Location
- 301 West 9th Street; Crossett, Arkansas 71635; United States
- Coordinates: 33°7′26.1″N 91°57′50.6″W

Information
- Type: Public high school
- Motto: A Tradition of Excellence
- School district: Crossett School District
- NCES District ID: 0504800
- CEEB code: 040540
- NCES School ID: 050480000202
- Principal: Anthony Boykin
- Grades: 9-12
- Enrollment: 483 (2023-2024)
- Colors: Maroon and white
- Athletics conference: 4A Region 8
- Team name: Crossett Eagles
- Accreditation: AdvancED (1924–); Arkansas Department of Education
- Website: www.crossettschools.org/o/high-school

Crossett High School is a comprehensive public high school in Crossett, Arkansas, United States. It is one of two public high schools located in Ashley County, and the sole high school administered by the Crossett School District.

In addition to Crossett the district, and therefore the school, also serves West Crossett and most of North Crossett.

== Academics ==
=== Curriculum ===
The assumed course of study that students complete is the Smart Core curriculum developed by the Arkansas Department of Education (ADE), which requires students to complete 22 units prior to graduation. Students complete regular and Advanced Placement (AP) coursework and exams. The school is accredited as a 1924 charter member of AdvancED. In 1963, educator Simmons McClintock was honored by the ADE as the 'Arkansas Teacher of the Year'.

=== Awards and recognition ===
In 2011, Crossett School District and its high school were recognized in the AP District of the Year Awards program in the College Board's 2nd Annual Honor Roll that consisted of 367 U.S. public school districts (4 in Arkansas) that simultaneously achieved increases in access to AP® courses for a broader number of students and improved the rate at which their AP students earned scores of 3 or higher on an AP Exam.

In 2012, Crossett School District and its high school were recognized in the AP District of the Year Awards program in the College Board's 3rd Annual Honor Roll that consisted of 539 U.S. public school districts (6 in Arkansas) that simultaneously achieved increases in access to AP® courses for a broader number of students and improved the rate at which their AP students earned scores of 3 or higher on an AP Exam.

== Extracurricular activities ==
The Crossett High School mascot is the eagle with maroon and white serving as the school colors. For 2012–present, the Crossett Eagles compete in the 4A classification administered by the Arkansas Activities Association in the 4A Region 8 Conference. The Eagles compete with interscholastic teams in baseball, basketball (boys/girls), football, golf (boys/girls), fast-pitch softball, speech, tennis (boys/girls), track and field (boys/girls), the cheer squad, and the Eaglette dance squad.

The Crossett Eagles have more than 50 state championships. In boys track and field, the Eagles have won over 25 state titles including twice winning seven consecutive banners between 1975–81 and 1983–89.

- 3x Football: 1966, 1978, 1984
- 1x Boys Basketball: 1968
- 2x Baseball: 1997, 1993
- 29x Boys Track & Field: 1958–59, 1967–69, 1975–81, 1983–89, 1991, 1994, 1998, 2002–03, 2016, 2018
- 7x Girls Track & Field: 1988, 1990–91, 1997, 2000, 2012,2014
- 5x Boys Cross Country: 1983–84, 1986–87, 1996
- 5x Decathlon: 1972, 1978–79, 1996–97
- 1x Boys Golf: 1954
- 5x Girls Tennis: 1984–86, 1991, 1993
- 6x Boys Swimming and Diving: 1950, 1952–53, 1956–58

In addition to sports, Crossett students may seek participation in clubs and organizations, such as: Future Farmers of America (FFA), Health Occupation Students of America (HOSA), Student Council, Yearbook, and honor societies.

== Notable people ==
- Jessie Clark (1978)—Former professional football player
- Jeremy Evans (2006)—Professional basketball player
- Keith Kidd, American football player
- Nap Murphy, state legislator
- Bryant Nelson, MLB Player
- Rylan Reed (2000)—Former football and baseball player
- Barry Switzer (1955)—College Football Hall of Fame inductee; 3x national champion at University of Oklahoma, 1995 Super Bowl champion coach
