= 2008 Texas Tech Red Raiders football team =

American college football season

2008 Texas Tech Red Raiders football

Big 12 South Division co-champion

Cotton Bowl Classic, L 34–47 vs. Ole Miss
- Conference: Big 12 Conference
- South Division

Ranking
- Coaches: No. 12
- AP: No. 12
- Record: 11–2 (7–1 Big 12)
- Head coach: Mike Leach (9th season)
- Offensive scheme: Air raid
- Defensive coordinator: Ruffin McNeill (2nd season)
- Base defense: 4–3
- Home stadium: Jones AT&T Stadium

2008 Big 12 Conference football standings
	Conf.			Overall
Team	W		L	W		L
North Division
No. 19 Missouri xy	5	–	3	10	–	4
Nebraska x	5	–	3	9	–	4
Kansas	4	–	4	8	–	5
Colorado	2	–	6	5	–	7
Kansas State	2	–	6	5	–	7
Iowa State	0	–	8	2	–	10
South Division
No. 5 Oklahoma xy$	7	–	1	12	–	2
No. 4 Texas x%	7	–	1	12	–	1
No. 12 Texas Tech x	7	–	1	11	–	2
No. 16 Oklahoma State	5	–	3	9	–	4
Baylor	2	–	6	4	–	8
Texas A&M	2	–	6	4	–	8
Championship: Oklahoma 62, Missouri 21
$ – BCS representative as conference champion; % – BCS at-large representative; x – Division champion/co-champions; y – Championship game participant; Rankings from AP Poll

The 2008 Texas Tech Red Raiders football team represented Texas Tech University as a member of the Big 12 Conference during the 2008 NCAA Division I FBS football season. Led by ninth-year head coach Mike Leach, the Red Raiders compiled an overall record of 11–2 with a mark of 7–1 in conference play, finishing in a three-way tie with Oklahoma and Texas atop the Big 12 South Division standing. To break the tie, the Bowl Championship Series BCS rankings were used to determine who would face Missouri in Big 12 Championship Game. Oklahoma, ranked No. 2 in the BCS poll, was chosen to represent the South Division in the game. Texas Tech was invited to the Cotton Bowl Classic, where they lost to Ole Miss. The Red Raiders played home games at Jones AT&T Stadium in Lubbock, Texas.

In a 2013 poll, the 2008 team was voted as the second best team in Texas Tech football history, losing to the 1973 team by a margin of 53.2% to 46.8%.

== Preseason ==
=== Rankings ===
Sports Illustrated's Stewart Mandel has Tech ranked at #10 in his preseason poll and later #8 in his college football power rankings. The team is also ranked #10 in the preseason by Fox Sports. ESPN.com writer Mark Schlabach ranked the Red Raiders #12 in his preseason poll and later #11 and #8 in revised editions of his preseason polls. In a March 26, 2008 article, Yahoo! Sports writer Olin Buchanan declared that Tech could challenge Oklahoma and Texas for supremacy in the Big 12 South in 2008. As plusses, he cited a strong quarterback (Graham Harrell), experienced wide receivers (including Michael Crabtree), and five returning starters on the offensive line. As a weakness, he mentioned the defense's trouble stopping the run but speculated that a year of experience and new talent may help to alleviate this problem. Another weak spot he pointed out was the Red Raiders' trouble moving the ball on the ground on those rare instances when a rushing play is called.

Texas Tech was ranked #14 in the preseason USA Today Coaches' Poll, their highest ever preseason ranking since the 1977 season when they came in at #8. The Associated Press's preseason poll put the team at #12.

=== Dave Campbell's Texas Football ===
Head coach Mike Leach, along with players Graham Harrell and Michael Crabtree

Coach Mike Leach, along with players Graham Harrell and Michael Crabtree were featured on the cover of the 2008 edition of Dave Campbell's Texas Football. The magazine predicted that the 2008 Red Raider football team would be the best in Texas and would challenge for the Big 12 South title.

=== Personnel changes ===
On January 22, 2008, Ruffin McNeill was hired as the team's defensive coordinator. He had held the position in an interim capacity since Lyle Setencich was reassigned during the previous season. After McNeill took over from Setencich, the Red Raiders' numbers for the 2007 season improved in all areas: rushing defense per game (198.1 to 157.1), passing defense per game (206.8 to 190.8), scoring defense per game (28.2 to 24.5), opponent first downs per game (22.5 to 19.9), and opponent third-down conversions per game (47.8% to 39.3%). For the McNeill-coached games, Tech's average yield of 347.9 yards was the lowest allowed in the Big 12 Conference, and the scoring defense was fourth-best in the conference for that time frame.

On February 1, 2008, offensive coordinator Dana Holgorsen resigned his position with the Red Raiders. He announced that he had been hired to the same position with the Houston Cougars.

== Schedule ==
Date	Time	Opponent	Rank	Site	TV	Result	Attendance	Source
August 30	6:00 pm	No. 7 (FCS) Eastern Washington*	No. 12	Jones AT&T Stadium; Lubbock, TX		W 49–24	49,887	
September 6	8:05 pm	at Nevada*	No. 12	Mackay Stadium; Reno, NV		W 35–19	24,453	
September 13	6:00 pm	SMU*	No. 12	Jones AT&T Stadium; Lubbock, TX	FSN	W 43–7	53,383	
September 20	6:00 pm	No. 9 (FCS) UMass*	No. 11	Jones AT&T Stadium; Lubbock, TX		W 56–14	53,190	
October 4	2:30 pm	at Kansas State	No. 7	Bill Snyder Family Football Stadium; Manhattan, KS	ABC	W 58–28	43,614	
October 11	2:00 pm	Nebraska^{†}	No. 7	Jones AT&T Stadium; Lubbock, TX	FSN	W 37–31 ^{OT}	53,449	
October 18	11:00 am	at Texas A&M	No. 7	Kyle Field; College Station, TX (rivalry)	FSN	W 43–25	86,012	
October 25	11:00 am	at No. 19 Kansas	No. 8	Memorial Stadium; Lawrence, KS	ESPN	W 63–21	50,125	
November 1	7:00 pm	No. 1 Texas	No. 7	Jones AT&T Stadium; Lubbock, TX (College GameDay)	ABC	W 39–33	56,333	
November 8	7:00 pm	No. 8 Oklahoma State	No. 2	Jones AT&T Stadium; Lubbock, TX	ABC	W 56–20	55,663	
November 22	7:00 pm	at No. 5 Oklahoma	No. 2	Gaylord Family Oklahoma Memorial Stadium; Norman, OK (College GameDay)	ABC	L 21–65	85,646	
November 29	2:30 pm	Baylor	No. 7	Jones AT&T Stadium; Lubbock, TX (rivalry)	Versus	W 35–28	53,470	
January 2	1:00 pm	vs. No. 20 Ole Miss*	No. 8	Cotton Bowl; Dallas, TX (Cotton Bowl Classic)	FOX	L 34–47	88,175	
*Non-conference game; ^{†}Homecoming; Rankings from AP Poll released prior to the game; All times are in Central time

== Roster ==
2008 Texas Tech Red Raiders football team roster
Players
Coaches
Offense

Pos.	#	Name	Class
RB	36	Gerardo Acevedo	So
RB	25	Baron Batch	So
WR	88	Brik Brikner	So
WR	27	Edward Britton	Jr
WR	3	Bobby Brodnax	Fr
OL	63	Landon Burge	So
C	51	Shawn Byrnes	Jr
OL	76	Brandon Carter	Jr
OL	66	Omar Castillo	Fr
WR	5	Michael Crabtree	So
RB	32	Aaron Crawford	So
QB	7	Seth Doege	Fr
WR	85	Cornelius Douglas	Fr
OL	78	Lonnie Edwards	Fr
OL	75	Blake Emert	Fr
WR	8	Jacoby Franks	Fr
OL	72	Deveric Gallington	Fr
RB	84	J.J. Griffin	Sr
RB	47	Ryan Hale	Jr
OL	71	Stephen Hamby	Jr
QB	6	Graham Harrell	Sr
WR	86	Rashad Hawk	Fr
WR	14	Landan Hoefer	Jr
WR	82	Adam James	Fr
RB	26	Harrison Jeffers	Fr
OL	69	Jake Johnson	Sr
WR	83	Blake Kelly	Jr
C	73	Justin Keown	So
OL	59	Joe King	Fr
WR	19	Lyle Leong	So
WR	12	Eric Morris	Sr
WR	17	Detron Lewis	So
QB	16	Stefan Loucks	Fr
OL	68	Terry McDaniel	Fr
OL	77	Mickey Okafor	Fr
OL	70	Chris Olson	So
QB	15	Taylor Potts	So
OL	74	Rylan Reed	Sr
WR	80	Adrian Reese	Jr
RB	30	Brandon Reid	Fr
QB	10	Garrett Riley	Fr
QB	18	Steven Sheffield	So
WR	11	Tramain Swindall	Fr
OL	65	Louis Vasquez	Sr
WR	4	Todd Walker	Jr
OL	67	Marlon Winn	Jr
RB	2	Shannon Woods	Sr
WR	87	Austin Zouzalik	Fr

Defense

Pos.	#	Name	Class
DL	96	Seth Ball	So
DT	97	Britton Barbee	So
LB	20	Bront Bird	So
CB	1	Marcus Bunton	Sr
LB	51	Jack Campbell	Fr
S	10	Daniel Charbonnet	Sr
DB	29	Taylor Charbonnet	Fr
LB	35	Blake Collier	Jr
S	6	Cody Davis	Fr
S	32	Brett Dewhurst	So
DE	43	McKinner Dixon	Jr
LB	57	Brian Duncan	So
LB	41	Sam Fehoko	Fr
DB	22	Jared Flannel	Fr
LB	18	Tanner Foster	Fr
DL	89	Joey Fowler	Fr
S	24	Lance Fuller	Sr
DL	61	Kyle Hack	So
DE	48	Ryan Haliburton	Fr
DE	56	Adrian Hamilton	So
LB	54	Riley Harvey	Fr
DT	91	Rajon Henley	Jr
S	23	Anthony Hines	Sr
DE	53	Daniel Howard	Jr
LB	13	Julius Howard	So
LB	52	Victor Hunter	Jr
DT	99	Richard Jones	Jr
S	7	Darcel McBath	Sr
S	26	Franklin Mitchem	So
DB	28	LaRon Moore	So
DL	95	David Neil	Fr
DB	33	Brent Nickerson	Jr
DL	94	Chris Perry	Fr
DE	98	Jake Ratliff	Sr
S	21	L.A. Reed	Sr
DB	31	Pete Richardson	Jr
DE	46	Sandy Riley	Jr
DB	30	Jarrel Rout	Jr
S	38	Jordy Rowland	Sr
DB	2	De'Shon Sanders	Jr
DB	34	Chris Scott	So
DE	90	Brandon Sesay	Jr
DE	92	Brandon Sharpe	Sr
LB	45	Tyrone Sonier	Fr
DT	42	Clint Stoffels	So
DB	40	Nathan Stone	So
S	12	LaShawn Vation	Jr
DB	3	Jamar Wall	Jr
DL	58	Chris Wallace	Jr
DL	93	Colby Whitlock	So
DE	84	Brandon Williams	Jr
LB	39	Marlon Williams	Jr

Special teams

Pos.	#	Name	Class
LS	50	Austin Burns	Jr
K	49	Donnie Carona	Fr
K	37	Cory Fowler	Sr
K	34	Teddy Karcasinas	Jr
P, K	9	Jonathan LaCour	So
K	85	Matt Williams	So

Head coach

- Mike Leach

Coordinators/assistant coaches

- Mike Leach Offensive coordinator
- Ruffin McNeill Defensive coordinator

Legend

- (C) Team captain
- (S) Suspended
- (I) Ineligible
- Injured
- Redshirt

Roster
Last update: August 3, 2008

== Player awards ==
Sorted alphabetically by last name.

Player	Position	Award(s)
Baron Batch	RB	All-Big 12 honorable mention
Brandon Carter	OL	All-Big 12 honorable mention AFCA Coaches' All-American
Michael Crabtree	WR	Fred Biletnikoff Award; WCFF first-team All-American; All-Big 12 first team Rivals.com first-team All-American; Afca coaches' All-American
Daniel Charbonnet	S	All-Big 12 First team (AP), All-Big 12 second team (coaches),
McKinner Dixon	DE	Big 12 Defensive Newcomer of the Year; All-Big 12 honorable mention
Brian Duncan	LB	All-Big 12 honorable mention
Graham Harrell	QB	Johnny Unitas Golden Arm Award; All-Big 12 honorable mention Afca coaches' All-American
Stephen Hamby	OL	All-Big 12 honorable mention
Darcel McBath	S	All-Big 12 first team
Rylan Reed	OL	WCFF first-team All-American; All-Big 12 second team
Louis Vasquez	OL	All-Big 12 second team Rivals.com second-team All-American
Jamar Wall	DB	All-Big 12 honorable mention
Colby Whitlock	DL	All-Big 12 honorable mention
Brandon Williams	DE	All-Big 12 first team
Marlon Williams	LB	All-Big 12 honorable mention
Marlon Winn	OL	All-Big 12 honorable mention
Shannon Woods	RB	All-Big 12 second team

== Game summaries ==
=== Eastern Washington ===
No. 7 (FCS) Eastern Washington Eagles at No. 12 Texas Tech Red Raiders – Game summary

Quarter	1	2	3	4	Total
No. 7 (FCS) Eagles	0	17	7	0	24
No. 12 Red Raiders	21	7	7	14	49

at Jones AT&T Stadium, Lubbock, Texas

- Date: August 30
- Game time: 6:00 p.m.
- Game weather: Temperature: 78 °F (26 °C) • Weather: Cloudy • Wind: S 8 MPH
- Game attendance: 49,887
- Referee: Roger Gaskamp
- Box score, Recap

Game information

First quarter

- TTU – Shannon Woods 2-yard run (Donnie Carona kick), 12:43. Red Raiders 7–0. Drive: 8 plays, 30 yards, 2:06.
- TTU – Graham Harrell 1-yard run (kick failed), 8:32. Red Raiders 13–0. Drive: 10 plays, 63 yards, 4:11.
- TTU – Michael Crabtree 4-yard pass from Graham Harrell (Graham Harrell pass to Detron Lewis), 0:48. Red Raiders 21–0. Drive: 10 plays, 90 yards, 3:25.

Second quarter

- EWU – Alexis Alexander 1-yard run (Felipe Macias kick), 13:45. Red Raiders 21–7. Drive: 3 plays, 7 yards, 0:58.
- TTU – Shannon Woods 1-yard run (Donnie Carona kick), 10:54. Red Raiders 28–7. Drive: 9 plays, 90 yards, 2:51.
- EWU – Matt Nichols 1-yard run (Felipe Macias kick), 2:44. Red Raiders 28–14. Drive: 7 plays, 54 yards, 5:15.
- EWU – Felipe Macias 55-yard field goal, 0:00. Red Raiders 28–17. Drive: 6 plays, 24 yards, 1:09.

Third quarter

- TTU – Edward Britton 1-yard pass from Graham Harrell (Donnie Carona kick), 4:51. Red Raiders 35–17. Drive: 8 plays, 61 yards, 3:24.
- EWU – Tony Davis 30-yard pass from Matt Nichols (Felipe Macias kick), 0:21. Red Raiders 35–24. Drive: 11 plays, 77 yards, 4:30.

Fourth quarter

- TTU – Aaron Crawford 6-yard run (Donnie Carona kick), 12:20. Red Raiders 42–24. Drive: 8 plays, 72 yards, 3:01.
- TTU – Baron Batch 26-yard run (Donnie Carona kick), 2:08. Red Raiders 49–24. Drive: 3 plays, 54 yards, 0:54.

Top passers

- EWU – Matt Nichols – 36/61, 335 yards, TD, INT
- TTU – Graham Harrell – 43/58, 536 yards, 2 TD, INT

Top rushers

- EWU – Dale Morris – 9 rushes, 17 yards
- TTU – Baron Batch – 5 rushes, 40 yards, TD

Top receivers

- EWU – Tony Davis – 13 receptions, 114 yards, TD
- TTU – Eric Morris – 9 receptions, 164 yards

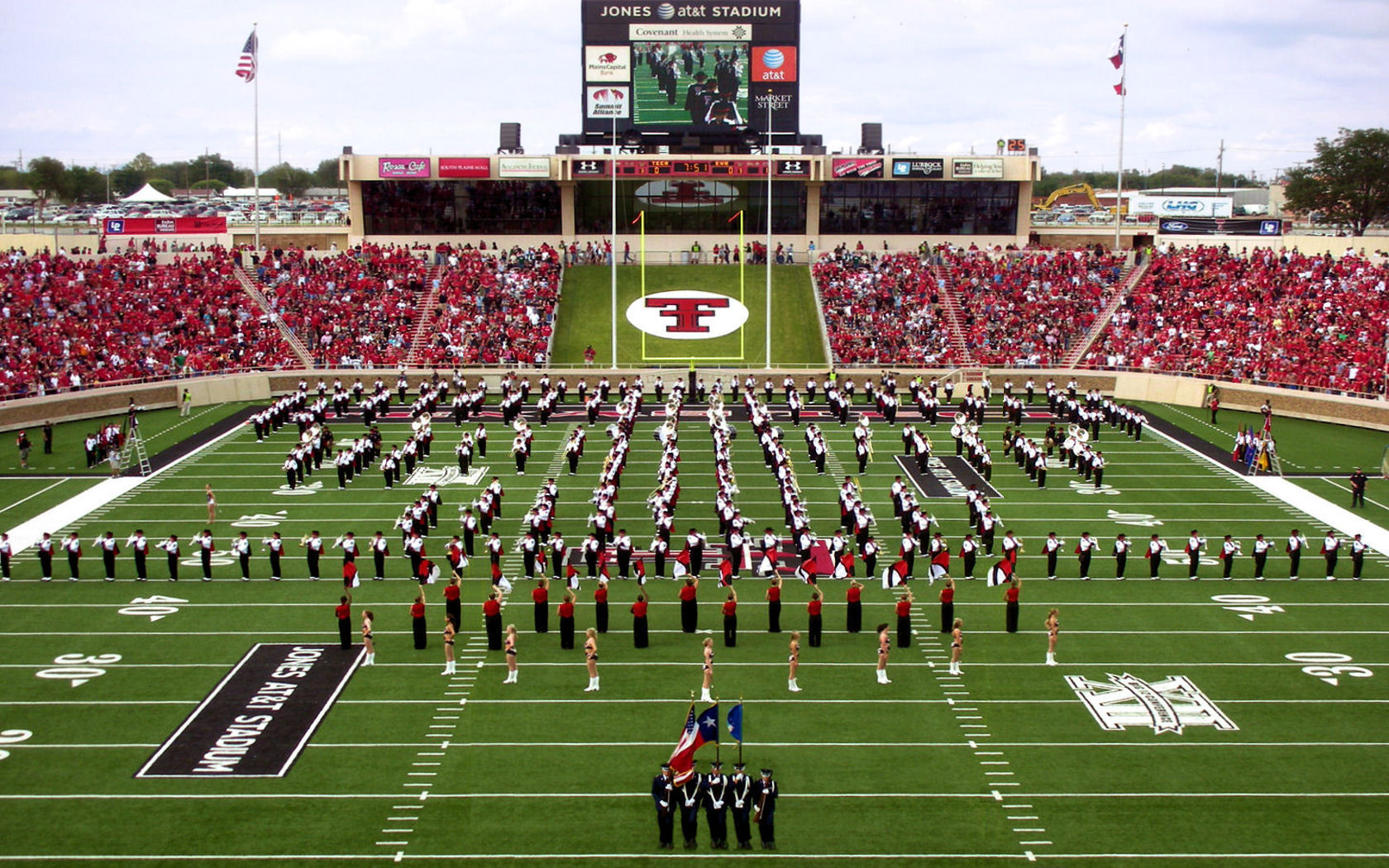
The Goin' Band from Raiderland and pom squad on the field prior to the season's debut game

The Tulsa Golden Hurricane were scheduled to travel to Lubbock for this game but backed out of the deal, choosing to play the Arkansas Razorbacks instead. On February 7, 2008, Texas Tech Athletic Director Gerald Myers announced that the Red Raiders would play the Eagles of Eastern Washington on August 30. During the previous season, the Eagles made it to the quarterfinals of the FCS playoffs before being defeated, 38–35, by three-time defending national champion Appalachian State. They came into the game ranked #7 in the FCS. Texas Tech came in with a #14 ranking in the FBS.

The Eagles won the coin toss and opted to receive the ball. On the first play after kickoff, Matt Nichols's pass was intercepted by Tech's Brian Duncan. The resulting drive ended in a two-yard rushing touchdown by Shannon Woods, followed by successful point after try by Donnie Corona. The Red Raiders scored twice more in the first quarter while shutting out the Eagles to bring the score to 21–0.

Eastern Washington was able to respond in the second quarter by scoring two touchdowns and a field goal. Meanwhile, Texas Tech was held to a single touchdown with successful PAT. Going into halftime, the score stood at 28–17 in favor of the Red Raiders.

In the third quarter, both Eastern Washington and Texas Tech added seven points. In the final quarter, the Red Raiders extended their lead when Aaron Crawford and Baron Batch both scored rushing touchdowns to bring the final score to 49–24.

During the game, the Red Raiders rushed 25 time for a total of 103 yards. Quarterback Graham Harrell completed 43 out of 58 pass attempts for 536 yards, two touchdowns and was intercepted once. He was named AT&T ESPN All-America Player of the Week for his performance. The team had a school record 18 penalties for 169 yards.

=== At Nevada ===
No. 12 Texas Tech Red Raiders at Nevada Wolf Pack – Game summary

Quarter	1	2	3	4	Total
No. 12 Red Raiders	7	7	7	14	35
Wolf Pack	3	6	3	7	19

at Mackay Stadium, Reno, Nevada

- Date: September 6
- Game time: 8:05 p.m. CDT / 6:05 PDT
- Game weather: Temperature: 91 °F (33 °C) • Weather: Clear • Wind: NW 6 MPH
- Game attendance: 24,453
- Referee: Jon Bible
- Box score, Recap

Game information

First quarter

- NEV – Brett Jaekle 27-yard field goal, 10:31. Wolf Pack 3–0. Drive: 5 plays, 20 yards, 2:02.
- TTU – Eric Morris 86-yard punt return (Donnie Carona kick), 7:51. Red Raiders 7–3.

Second quarter

- NEV – Brett Jaekle 26-yard field goal, 7:24. Red Raiders 7–6. Drive: 12 plays, 47 yards, 6:10.
- TTU – Shannon Woods 1-yard run (Donnie Carona kick), 5:18. Red Raiders 14–6. Drive: 5 plays, 68 yards, 2:06.
- NEV – Brett Jaekle 43-yard field goal, 0:00. Red Raiders 14–9. Drive: 4 plays, 9 yards, 2:38.

Third quarter

- NEV – Brett Jaekle 31-yard field goal, 6:40. Red Raiders 14–12. Drive: 5 plays, 15 yards, 1:57.
- TTU – Eric Morris 13-yard run (Donnie Carona kick), 5:20. Red Raiders 21–12. Drive: 6 plays, 39 yards, 1:20.

Fourth quarter

- TTU – Michael Crabtree 82-yard pass from Graham Harrell (Donnie Carona kick), 11:34. Red Raiders 28–12. Drive: 4 plays, 93 yards, 2:47.
- NEV – Marko Mitchell 48-yard pass from Colin Kaepernick (Brett Jaekle kick), 10:30. Red Raiders 28–19. Drive: 4 plays, 65 yards, 0:55.
- TTU – Shannon Woods 21-yard run (Donnie Carona kick), 6:18. Red Raiders 35–19. Drive: 11 plays, 84 yards, 4:12.

Top passers

- TTU – Graham Harrell – 19/46, 297 yards, TD, 2 INT
- NEV – Colin Kaepernick – 23/34, 264 yards, TD, INT

Top rushers

- TTU – Baron Batch – 6 rushes, 47 yards
- NEV – Colin Kaepernick – 17 rushes, 92 yards

Top receivers

- TTU – Michael Crabtree – 7 receptions, 158 yards, TD
- NEV – Marko Mitchell – 8 receptions, 147 yards, TD

The Red Raiders started off with the ball to begin the game. After failing to get a first down on the first three plays, Texas Tech decided to go for it on fourth down in Nevada territory and failed to make it. On the ensuing Nevada drive, the Wolf Pack successfully kicked a field goal giving them the lead, 0–3. On the next drive by Texas Tech, Graham Harrell's pass was intercepted by Uche Anyanwu. The next Nevada drive stalled on a three-and-out. Nevada was forced to punt to Eric Morris who took it 86 yards for a touchdown, giving the Red Raiders the lead, 7–3. Texas Tech and Nevada failed to score on their next drives with Nevada missing a field goal with a few minutes remaining in the first quarter.

In the second quarter, Nevada's only points came from a field goal. Texas Tech drove 68 yards on five plays and scored on a one-yard run by Shannon Woods. The key play was a 50-yard pass from Harrell to Michael Crabtree who ran it all the way to the one-yard line. On the next Nevada drive, defensive end Brandon Williams tipped a pass which landed in the hands of defensive tackle Richard Jones. Both teams went scoreless the rest of the half. Nevada received the kickoff to begin the second half and immediately drove the field. Nevada's quarterback Colin Kaepernick dove into the endzone in what appeared to be a touchdown. However, after a lengthy review, the officials agreed that Texas Tech's Daniel Charbonnet forced the ball out of Kaepernick's hands resulting in a touchback. The next Red Raider drive, Mike Leach decided to go for a first down on fourth down, which they failed to make again. Nevada's resulting drive stalled, but they were able to kick a field goal due to good field position after the failed fourth down attempt. The only other points in the third quarter came on Texas Tech's next drive of six plays and 39 yards, scoring on Eric Morris' 13-yard run giving the Red Raiders the lead, 21–12.

Harrell was intercepted to begin fourth quarter and the resulting Nevada drive went three-and-out. On the next drive, Harrell and Crabtree connected for another big play, this one resulting in 82-yards and a touchdown giving Texas Tech a 28–12 lead. Texas Tech's celebration did not last long, as on the very next drive Nevada's Kaepernick passed for the team's only touchdown, a 48-yard pass to Marko Mitchell to make the score 28–19 in favor of Texas Tech. The Red Raiders scored on their very next drive on a 21-yard run by Woods with 6:18 remaining. The next Nevada drive resulted in a turnover on downs and the Red Raiders held on to the ball and the win, 35–19.

The story of the game was Texas Tech's defense, not the offense. So much so, that as the Red Raiders were walking off the field, Texas Tech fans in attendance chanted, "De-fense! De-fense!" Although they allowed 488 total yards, the defense held the Wolf Pack to four field goals in six red zone attempts. Harrell, after being named Player of the Week last week against Eastern Washington, went 19 of 46 (41.3%) and 297 yards with one touchdown and two interceptions and set a career low in completions and completion percentage. There has been only two other times in Harrell's career in which he had completed less than 60 percent of his passes. This is the first time Texas Tech has won one of those games. Michael Crabtree had 7 catches for 158 yards and one touchdown.

Nevada's place kicker Brett Jaekle went 4 of 6 on field goals from distances of 27, 26, 43, and 31 yards. Nevada quarterback Kaepernick had a huge game going 24 of 35 for 264 yards, one touchdown, and one interception. He was also the team's leading rusher, gaining 92 yards on 17 carries.

=== SMU ===
SMU Mustangs at No. 12 Texas Tech Red Raiders – Game summary

Quarter	1	2	3	4	Total
Mustangs	0	0	0	7	7
No. 12 Red Raiders	15	7	14	7	43

at Jones AT&T Stadium, Lubbock, Texas

- Date: September 6
- Game time: 8:05 p.m.
- Game weather: Temperature: 82 °F (28 °C) • Weather: Partly cloudy • Wind: NNE 12 MPH
- Game attendance: 53,383
- Referee: Adrian Hill
- TV: FSN
- Box score, Recap

Game information

First quarter

- TTU – Donnie Carona 35-yard field goal, 12:29. Red Raiders 3–0. Drive: 8 plays, 30 yards, 2:19.
- TTU – Baron Batch 43-yard run (kick failed), 6:36. Red Raiders 9–0. Drive: 2 plays, 46 yards, 0:45.
- TTU – Michael Crabtree 23-yard pass from Graham Harrell (pass failed), 5:39. Red Raiders 15–0. Drive: 2 plays, 21 yards, 0:37.

Second quarter

- TTU – Michael Crabtree 47-yard pass from Graham Harrell (Donnie Carona kick), 8:51. Red Raiders 22–0. Drive: 6 plays, 98 yards, 2:09.

Third quarter

- TTU – Michael Crabtree 50-yard pass from Graham Harrell (Donnie Carona kick), 13:30. Red Raiders 29–0. Drive: 4 plays, 72 yards, 1:30.
- TTU – Edward Britton 7-yard pass from Graham Harrell (Donnie Carona kick), 3:52. Red Raiders 36–0. Drive: 7 plays, 88 yards, 3:32.

Fourth quarter

- TTU – Detron Lewis 44-yard pass from Graham Harrell (Donnie Carona kick), 13:04. Red Raiders 43–0. Drive: 11 plays, 84 yards, 4:48.
- SMU – Aldrick Robinson 7-yard pass from Logan Turner (Thomas Morstead kick), 3:29. Red Raiders 43–7. Drive: 15 plays, 86 yards, 6:09.

Top passers

- SMU – Bo Levi Mitchell – 13/24, 155 yards, 5 INT
- TTU – Graham Harrell – 31/48, 418 yards, 5 TD

Top rushers

- SMU – DeMyron Martin – 10 rushes, 33 yards
- TTU – Baron Batch – 10 rushes, 98 yards, TD

Top receivers

- SMU – Emmanuel Sanders – 8 receptions, 125 yards
- TTU – Michael Crabtree – 8 receptions, 164 yards, 3 TD

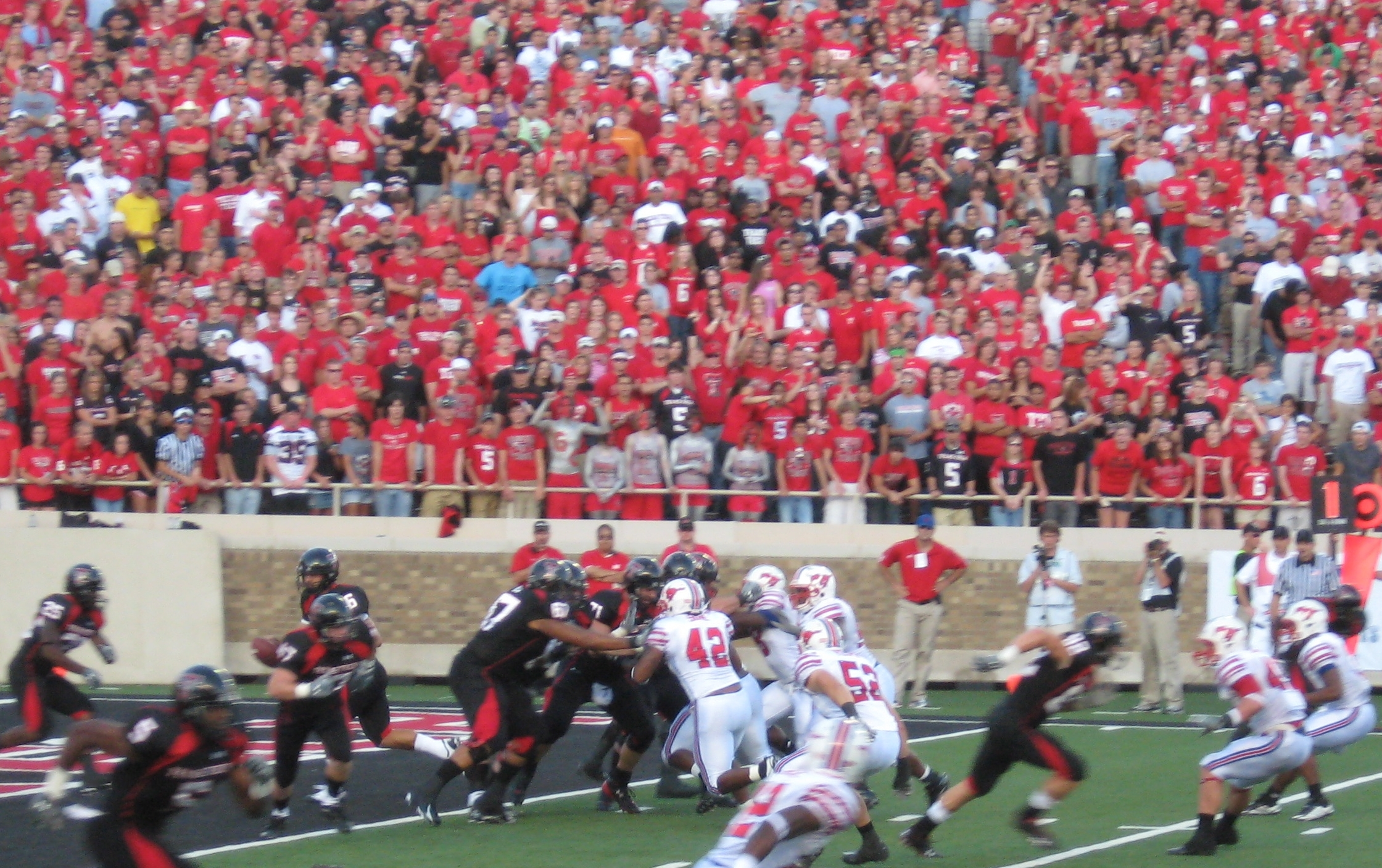
Tech on offense against SMU

The Mustangs received the kickoff to begin the game. On the first play from scrimmage, SMU quarterback Bo Levi Mitchell's pass was intercepted by Daniel Charbonnet. Tech's following offensive drive ended in a Donnie Carona 35-yard field goal. The Red Raiders scored twice more in the first quarter. The first on a 43-yard rush by Baron Batch, followed by failed Carona point-after try. The second on a 23-yard pass from Graham Harrell to Michael Crabtree, followed by failed two-point conversion. Tech scored once in the second quarter to bring the score to 22–0 at the half.

In the second half, the Red Raiders scored three more times before putting in backup personnel.

The Mustangs only score of the game came with 3:29 remaining when Logan Turner passed to Aldrick Robinson for a seven-yard touchdown, followed by a successful Thomas Morstead PAT.

Texas Tech safety Daniel Charbonnet had a school-record three interceptions and was later named Big 12 Defensive Player of the Week.

=== UMass ===
UMass Minutemen at No. 11 Texas Tech Red Raiders – Game summary

Quarter	1	2	3	4	Total
Minutemen	7	0	0	7	14
No. 11 Red Raiders	21	21	14	0	56

at Jones AT&T Stadium, Lubbock, Texas

- Date: September 20
- Game time: 6:00 p.m.
- Game weather: Temperature: 81 °F (27 °C) • Weather: Clear • Wind: Calm
- Game attendance: 53,190
- Referee: Karl Richins
- Box score, Recap

Game information

First quarter

- TTU – Shannon Woods 2-yard run (Donnie Carona kick), 11:20. Red Raiders 7–0. Drive: 9 plays, 58 yards, 5:33.
- TTU – Tramain Swindall 17-yard pass from Graham Harrell (Donnie Carona kick), 7:47. Red Raiders 14–0. Drive: 4 plays, 63 yards, 1:40.
- UMASS – Brian Ellis 53-yard fumble return (Armando Cuko kick), 3:25. Red Raiders 14–7
- TTU – Eric Morris 12-yard pass from Graham Harrell (Donnie Carona kick), 0:39. Red Raiders 21–7. Drive: 8 plays, 79 yards, 2:46.

Second quarter

- TTU – Shannon Woods 38-yard run (Donnie Carona kick), 12:48. Red Raiders 28–7. Drive: 4 plays, 69 yards, 2:12.
- TTU – Michael Crabtree 2-yard pass from Graham Harrell (Donnie Carona kick), 5:12. Red Raiders 35–7. Drive: 8 plays, 68 yards, 7:36.
- TTU – Eric Morris 4-yard pass from Graham Harrell (Donnie Carona kick), 0:58. Red Raiders 42–7. Drive: 6 plays, 38 yards, 2:18.

Third quarter

- TTU – Darcel McBath 45-yard interception return (Donnie Carona kick), 13:36. Red Raiders 49–7.
- TTU – Shannon Woods 18-yard run (Donnie Carona kick), 3:20. Red Raiders 56–7. Drive: 12 plays, 73 yards, 5:37.

Fourth quarter

- UMASS – Korrey Davis 2-yard run (Armando Cuko kick), 0:51. Red Raiders 56–14. Drive: 13 plays, 63 yards, 5:25.

Top passers

- UMASS – Liam Coen – 13/20, 145 yards, INT
- TTU – Graham Harrell – 27/34, 322 yards, 4 TD

Top rushers

- UMASS – Korrey Davis – 15 rushes, 51 yards, TD
- TTU – Shannon Woods – 10 rushes, 108 yards, 3 TD

Top receivers

- UMASS – Jeremy Horne – 2 receptions, 58 yards
- TTU – Baron Batch – 5 receptions, 68 yards

During the first quarter, the Red Raiders scored three touchdowns, followed by successful point after tries. The Minutemen scored once, on a 53-yard return of a Texas Tech fumble. The Red Raiders scored three times in the second quarter while shutting out the Minutemen. The score going into the half stood at 42–7.

Tech's first score of the third quarter came when Darcel Mcbath returned an interception 45 yards for a touchdown. Their second score was an 18-yard rushing touchdown by Shannon Woods. At the end of the third period of play, Texas Tech led 56–7. The only score by either team in the fourth quarter was a 2-yard rush by UMass's Korrey Davis with 51 seconds remaining on the game clock. The final score was 56–14 in favor of the Red Raiders.

During the game, Texas Tech's Graham Harrell completed 27 of 34 passes for 322 yards. Backup quarterback Taylor Potts was 4 of 9 for 37 yards. The Red Raiders had a total of 359 yards passing with 11 players catching passes. They also had 179 yards combined rushing from 5 different players.

=== At Kansas State ===
No. 7 Texas Tech Red Raiders at Kansas State Wildcats – Game summary

Quarter	1	2	3	4	Total
No. 7 Red Raiders	14	24	7	13	58
Wildcats	7	7	7	7	28

at Bill Snyder Family Football Stadium, Manhattan, Kansas

- Date: October 4
- Game time: 2:30 p.m.
- Game weather: Temperature: 77 °F (25 °C) • Weather: Partly cloudy • Wind: SSE 16-23 MPH
- Game attendance: 43,614
- Referee: Gerald Wright
- TV: ABC
- Box score, Recap

Game information

First quarter

- TTU – Lyle Leong 1-yard pass from Graham Harrell (Donnie Carona kick), 12:57. Red Raiders 7–0. Drive: 6 plays, 80 yards, 2:03.
- KSU – Ernie Pierce 33-yard pass from Josh Freeman (Brooks Rossman kick), 11:31. Tied 7–7. Drive: 4 plays, 68 yards, 1:26.
- TTU – Michael Crabtree 10-yard pass from Graham Harrell (Donnie Carona kick), 5:07. Red Raiders 14–7. Drive: 14 plays, 80 yards, 6:24.

Second quarter

- KSU – Josh Freeman 1-yard run (Brooks Rossman kick), 14:35. Tied 14–14. Drive: 4 plays, 29 yards, 1:14.
- TTU – Donnie Carona 31-yard field goal, 9:43. Red Raiders 17–14. Drive: 11 plays, 51 yards, 4:52.
- TTU – Lyle Leong 15-yard pass from Graham Harrell (Donnie Carona kick), 8:12. Red Raiders 24–14. Drive: 4 plays, 53 yards, 1:03.
- TTU – Ryan Hale 4-yard pass from Graham Harrell (Donnie Carona kick), 3:53. Red Raiders 31–14. Drive: 9 plays, 70 yards, 3:42.
- TTU – Michael Crabtree 29-yard pass from Graham Harrell (Donnie Carona kick), 0:44. Red Raiders 38–14. Drive: 7 plays, 54 yards, 1:08.

Third quarter

- KSU – Josh Freeman 3-yard run (Brooks Rossman kick), 8:45. Red Raiders 38–21. Drive: 15 plays, 80 yards, 6:15.
- TTU – Lyle Leong 7-yard pass from Graham Harrell (Donnie Carona kick), 4:34. Red Raiders 45–21. Drive: 9 plays, 76 yards, 4:11.

Fourth quarter

- TTU – Graham Harrell 1-yard run (Donnie Carona kick), 13:45. Red Raiders 52–21. Drive: 9 plays, 52 yards, 3:49.
- TTU – Baron Batch 9-yard run (kick failed), 12:01. Red Raiders 58–21. Drive: 5 plays, 34 yards, 1:28.
- KSU – Ernie Pierce 18-yard punt return (Brooks Rossman kick), 4:22. Red Raiders 58–28.

Top passers

- TTU – Graham Harrell – 38/51, 454 yards, 6 TD
- KSU – Josh Freeman – 13/28, 170 yards, TD

Top rushers

- TTU – Shannon Woods – 18 rushes, 70 yards
- KSU – LaMark Brown – 25 rushes, 64 yards

Top receivers

- TTU – Michael Crabtree – 9 receptions, 107 yards, 2 TD
- KSU – Brandon Banks – 3 receptions, 51 yards

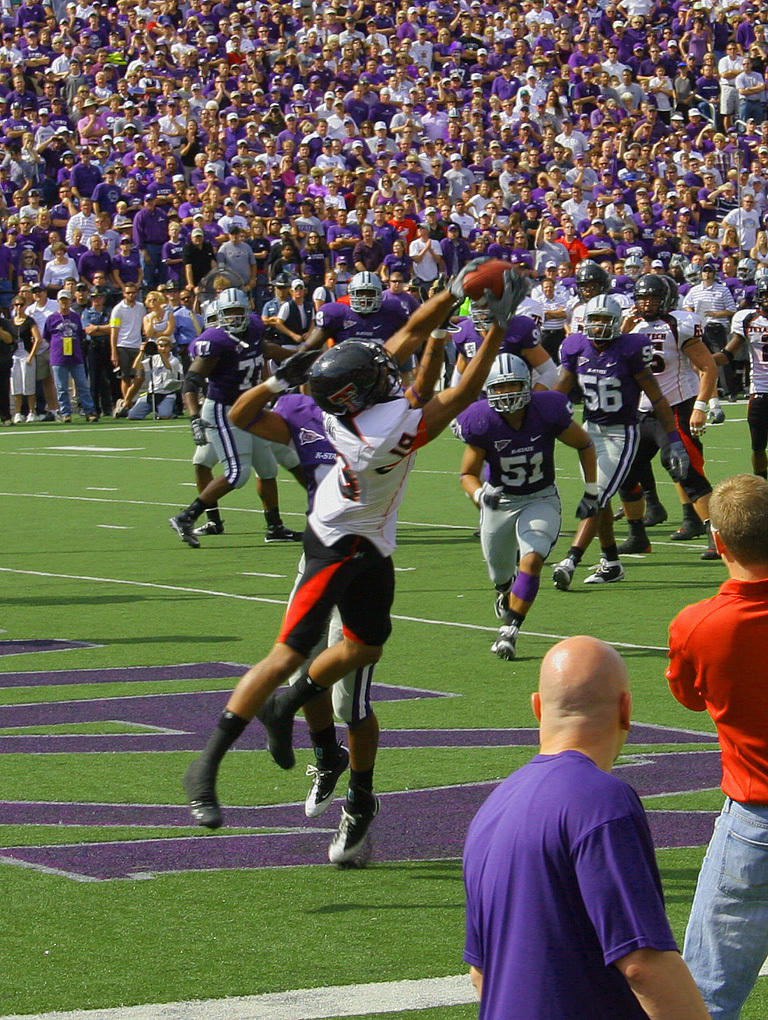
Texas Tech's Lyle Leong catching a pass for a touchdown against Kansas State

Coming into the game, K-State had lost the last 3 of 4 to the Red Raiders. Their last win against Texas Tech was in 2000 in Manhattan, Kansas. Texas Tech was favored by seven.

The Red Raiders scored first, on a 1-yard pass from Graham Harrell to Lyle Leong. The Wildcats responded by scoring on the following drive on a 33-yard TD pass to Ernie Pierce. Texas Tech made another touchdown, followed by successful PAT, to bring the score to 14–7. Facing fourth-and-inches from their own 29 late in the first quarter, the Red Raiders sent Shannon Woods on a sweep. But he was stopped and, four plays later, Kansas State quarterback Josh Freeman scored on a 1-yard run, bringing the score to 14–14. A moment later, Texas Tech's Richard Jones recovered Lamark Brown's fumble on the Kansas State 34 and Baron Batch capped the ensuing drive with a 9-yard touchdown run on the following play to make the score 58–21.

On successive possessions in the second quarter, Harrell led quick-hitting drives of 53-, 70-, and 54-yards. Freeman, however, misfired on 9 of 10 passes, several of which Tech defenders got their hands on. The Kansas State junior, who a week earlier had become his own school's career passing leader, was 13-for-28 for 170 yards. Ernie Pierce scored on an 18-yard return of a blocked punt late in the game.

K-State's defense gave up 626 yards in the game. It was the third consecutive game that the Wildcats gave up more than 600 yards on defense. Graham Harrell threw six touchdown passes, matching his single-game career best. During the game, he also broke the school passing-yards record of 12,429 yard set by Kliff Kingsbury from 1999 to 2002. For his performance, Harrell was also named Big 12 Conference Offensive Player of the Week as well as the O'Brien Quarterback of the Week.

Lyle Leong snared three touchdown passes from Harrell, who was 38-for-51 for 454 yards. Texas Tech scored on seven straight possessions and did not attempt a punt until Taylor Potts replaced Harrell late in the fourth quarter. Heisman candidate Michael Crabtree had nine catches for 107 yards and two TDs. With six, Harrell tied his career-best for touchdown passes, getting the ball to ten different receivers.

=== Nebraska ===
Nebraska Cornhuskers at No. 7 Texas Tech Red Raiders – Game summary

Quarter	1	2	3	4	OT	Total
Cornhuskers	0	7	3	21	0	31
No. 7 Red Raiders	7	10	7	7	6	37

at Jones AT&T Stadium, Lubbock, Texas

- Date: October 11
- Game time: 2:00 p.m.
- Game weather: Temperature: 69 °F (21 °C) • Weather: Cloudy • Wind: SE 13 MPH
- Game attendance: 53,449
- Referee: Scott Novak
- TV announcers (FSN): Joel Myers (play-by-play), Gary Reasons (analyst) and Jim Knox (sideline)
- Box score, Recap

Game information

First quarter

- TTU – Michael Crabtree 35-yard pass from Graham Harrell (Donnie Carona kick), 4:49. Red Raiders 7–0. Drive: 7 plays, 80 yards, 3:18.

Second quarter

- NEB – Quentin Castille 4-yard run (Alex Henery kick), 11:46. Tied 7–7. Drive: 15 plays, 74 yards, 8:03.
- TTU – Donnie Carona 26-yard field goal, 8:13. Red Raiders 10–7. Drive: 6 plays, 59 yards, 3:33.
- TTU – Shannon Woods 4-yard run (Donnie Carona kick), 1:18. Red Raiders 17–7. Drive: 4 plays, 70 yards, 1:19.

Third quarter

- NEB – Alex Henery 21-yard field goal, 8:00. Red Raiders 17–10. Drive: 14 plays, 75 yards, 7:00.
- TTU – Michael Crabtree 4-yard pass from Graham Harrell (Donnie Carona kick), 4:47. Red Raiders 24–10. Drive: 7 plays, 77 yards, 3:13.

Fourth quarter

- NEB – Joe Ganz 1-yard run (Alex Henery kick), 12:10. Red Raiders 24–17. Drive: 13 plays, 73 yards, 7:37.
- NEB – Dreu Young 2-yard pass from Joe Ganz (Alex Henery kick), 6:06. Tied 24–24. Drive: 8 plays, 68 yards, 4:04.
- TTU – Graham Harrell 1-yard run (Donnie Carona kick), 2:21. Red Raiders 31–24. Drive: 10 plays, 80 yards, 3:45.
- NEB – Todd Peterson 17-yard pass from Joe Ganz (Alex Henery kick), 0:29. Tied 31–31. Drive: 8 plays, 79 yards, 1:52.

Overtime

- TTU – Eric Morris 1-yard run (kick blocked). Red Raiders 38–31. Drive: 4 plays, 25 yards.

Top passers

- NEB – Joe Ganz – 36/44, 349 yards, 2 TD, INT
- TTU – Graham Harrell – 20/25, 284 yards, 2 TD

Top rushers

- NEB – Marlon Lucky – 16 rushes, 66 yards
- TTU – Baron Batch – 10 rushes, 97 yards

Top receivers

- NEB – Marlon Lucky – 7 receptions, 80 yards
- TTU – Michael Crabtree – 5 receptions, 89 yards, 2 TD

For homecoming, Texas Tech hosted the Nebraska Cornhuskers. Coming into the game, the Cornhuskers led the all-time series with Texas Tech, 7–2. However, the Red Raiders had won the previous two games. At Texas Tech's 2004 homecoming, they dealt Nebraska their worst loss in school history, 70–10. The following year, the Red Raiders won, 34–31, in Lincoln. This was Nebraska's first loss at their own homecoming in 37 years.

To begin the game, both the Red Raiders and Cornhuskers were forced to punt. On Texas Tech's next drive, Graham Harrell connected with Michael Crabtree on a 35-yard pass for the only score in the first quarter. This touchdown gave Crabtree the most touchdown receptions in school history. On the ensuing Nebraska drive, Quentin Castille scored on a 4-yard run and tied the game at 7–7. Texas Tech's Donnie Carona successfully kicked a 26-yard field goal on the Red Raider's next drive. After forcing a Nebraska turnover on downs, Shannon Woods gave Texas Tech a 17–7 lead on a 4-yard run. Nebraska later missed a field goal to end the half.

Nebraska began with the ball in the second half and drove 75 yards and scored on an Alex Henery 21-yard field goal. On the ensuing Texas Tech drive, Harrell again found Crabtree in the end zone this time on a 4-yard pass. Texas Tech had the lead 24–10 to end the third quarter.

To begin the fourth quarter, the Texas Tech defense forced a Nebraska fourth down and 1 in field goal range. The Cornhuskers brought out the kicker but faked the field goal and passed for a first down to the 1-yard line. Nebraska's Joe Ganz then scored on a 1-yard quarterback sneak to pull Nebraska within 7 points with 12:10 remaining in the fourth quarter. After a Red Raider punt, the Cornhuskers once again drove the field and scored on a Ganz 2-yard pass to Dreu Young to tie the game at 24–24. On the very next drive by Texas Tech, the Cornhuskers forced the Red Raiders to a fourth down with 5 yards to go on Texas Tech's own 36-yard line. Mike Leach decided to go for it, and Harrell found Crabtree again for a 47-yard reception keeping the drive alive. Harrell later said of the play, "If he was just a little covered, I would go to him. I threw it up there and he made the play." A few plays later, Harrell scored on a 1-yard run to give the Red Raiders the lead 31–24. Nebraska then drove the field 79 yards in 8 plays and scored on a 17-yard pass from Ganz to Todd Peterson to tie the game at 31 a piece with 29 seconds remaining in the game. Texas Tech failed to score on the next drive and the game went into overtime.

In overtime, Texas Tech received the ball first. The Red Raiders utilized a screen pass to running back Baron Batch to the 1-yard line. Harrell then handed the ball to Eric Morris for a 1-yard touchdown run. On the extra point, however, Carona's kick was partially blocked which kept the score difference at 6, 37–31. On Nebraska's first overtime try, Ganz's pass was intercepted by cornerback Jamar Wall after Ganz tried to throw the ball away to avoid being sacked. This interception gave Texas Tech the win preserving their top-10 ranking.

Harrell's two touchdown passes to Crabtree gave the tandem the most touchdown connections by a quarterback-receiver combination in Big 12 Conference history with 32. Harrell ended the game completing 20 of his 25 passes for 284 yards and two touchdowns. Crabtree caught 5 passes for 89 yards and 2 touchdowns. Running back Baron Batch rushed 10 times for 89 yards.

Nebraska's Joe Ganz completed 36 of his 44 passes for 349 yards, two touchdowns, and one interception. The Cornhuskers held the ball for 40 minutes and 12 seconds in contrast to Texas Tech's 19 minutes and 48 seconds.

=== At Texas A&M ===
No. 7 Texas Tech Red Raiders at Texas A&M Aggies – Game summary

Quarter	1	2	3	4	Total
No. 7 Red Raiders	7	13	10	13	43
Aggies	10	13	0	2	25

at Kyle Field, College Station, Texas

- Date: October 18
- Game time: 11:00 a.m.
- Game weather: Temperature: 70 °F (21 °C) • Weather: 30-40% humidity • Wind: NE 5-10 MPH
- Game attendance: 86,012
- Referee: Jon Bible
- TV: FSN
- Box score, Recap

Game information

First quarter

- TAMU – Randy Bullock 46-yard field goal, 12:09. Aggies 3–0. Drive: 7 plays, 46 yards, 2:51.
- TTU – Michael Crabtree 25-yard pass from Graham Harrell (Cory Fowler kick), 10:01. Red Raiders 7–3. Drive: 6 plays, 42 yards, 2:08.
- TAMU – Ryan Tannehill 3-yard pass from Stephen McGee (Randy Bullock kick), 3:18. Aggies 10–7. Drive: 14 plays, 83 yards, 6:43.

Second quarter

- TTU – Baron Batch 3-yard run (kick failed), 14:12. Red Raiders 13–10. Drive: 10 plays, 67 yards, 3:57.
- TAMU – Randy Bullock 28-yard field goal, 9:48. Tied 13–13. Drive: 12 plays, 80 yards, 4:33.
- TAMU – Randy Bullock 18-yard field goal, 6:29. Aggies 16–13. Drive: 7 plays, 14 yards, 2:55.
- TTU – Baron Batch 8-yard pass from Graham Harrell (Cory Fowler kick), 3:51. Red Raiders 20–16. Drive: 8 plays, 80 yards, 2:38.
- TAMU – Mike Goodson 1-yard run (Randy Bullock kick), 0:23. Aggies 23–20. Drive: 5 plays, 55 yards, 1:31.

Third quarter

- TTU – Michael Crabtree 3-yard pass from Graham Harrell (Cory Fowler kick), 11:10. Red Raiders 27–23. Drive: 9 plays, 77 yards, 3:59.
- TTU – Cory Fowler 25-yard field goal, 2:44. Red Raiders 30–23. Drive: 10 plays, 44 yards, 4:37.

Fourth quarter

- TTU – Graham Harrell 1-yard run (kick blocked), 7:00. Red Raiders 36–23. Drive: 13 plays, 80 yards, 6:56.
- TAMU – Arkeith Brown 98-yard defensive 2-point conversion, 7:00. Red Raiders 36–25.
- TTU – Graham Harrell 1-yard run (Cory Fowler kick), 0:20. Red Raiders 43–25. Drive: 12 plays, 76 yards, 4:42.

Top passers

- TTU – Graham Harrell – 44/56, 450 yards, 3 TD, 2 INT
- TAMU – Jerrod Johnson – 26/39, 283 yards

Top rushers

- TTU – Baron Batch – 13 rushes, 87 yards, TD
- TAMU – Mike Goodson – 8 rushes, 18 yards, TD

Top receivers

- TTU – Tramain Swindall – 7 receptions, 101 yards
- TAMU – Ryan Tannehill – 5 receptions, 104 yards, TD

Although, before the game, the Texas A&M Aggies led the all-time series with the Red Raiders, 34–31–1, they have not beaten Texas Tech since an overtime victory at Kyle Field in 2004. Mike Leach had a 6–2 record versus the Aggies. Sports bettors favor Tech to win by 21 points.

The Aggies scored first on a 46-yard Randy Bullock field goal. The Red Raiders were able to answer with a touchdown to take the lead. However, A&M responded with a touchdown of their own, bringing the score to 10–7 in their favor. Thirty-nine seconds into the second quarter, Tech's Baron Batch scored on a three-yard run but the point after try was blocked. The Aggies scored two more field goals before the Red Raiders scored on an eight-yard pass from Graham Harrell to Baron Batch. Cory Fowler's extra point was good and Tech held a 20–16 advantage before A&M scored another touchdown to take a 20–23 halftime lead.

In the third quarter, Texas Tech scored a touchdown and a field goal while holding A&M scoreless. Going into the final period of play, the Red Raiders led 30–23. With seven minutes remaining in the game, Texas Tech scored on a one-yard run by Graham Harrell. The extra point was blocked by Texas A&M and returned 97 yards by Arkeith Brown for the Aggies' final score of the game. The Red Raiders added one more touchdown to bring the final score to 43–25.

=== At Kansas ===
No. 8 Texas Tech Red Raiders at No. 19 Kansas Jayhawks – Game summary

Quarter	1	2	3	4	Total
No. 8 Red Raiders	14	21	21	7	63
No. 19 Jayhawks	14	0	0	7	21

at Memorial Stadium, Lawrence, Kansas

- Date: October 25
- Game time: 11:00 a.m.
- Game weather: Temperature: 51 °F (11 °C) • Weather: Sunny • Wind: WSW 7 MPH
- Game attendance: 50,125
- Referee: C. Castleberry
- TV announcers (ESPN): Dave Pasch (play-by-play), Andre Ware (analyst) and Rob Stone (sideline)
- Box score, Recap

Game information

First quarter

- TTU – Edward Britton 55-yard pass from Graham Harrell (Matt Williams kick), 12:46. Red Raiders 7–0. Drive: 2 plays, 56 yards, 0:52.
- KU – Kerry Meier 33-yard pass from Todd Reesing (Jacob Branstetter kick), 8:58. Tied 7–7. Drive: 8 plays, 79 yards, 3:48.
- TTU – Michael Crabtree 4-yard pass from Graham Harrell (Matt Williams kick), 5:54. Red Raiders 14–7. Drive: 8 plays, 83 yards, 3:04.
- KU – Dezmon Briscoe 10-yard pass from Todd Reesing (Jacob Branstetter kick), 1:09. Tied 14–14. Drive: 9 plays, 72 yards, 4:45.

Second quarter

- TTU – Eric Morris 7-yard pass from Graham Harrell (Matt Williams kick), 12:58. Red Raiders 21–14. Drive: 7 plays, 79 yards, 3:11.
- TTU – Shannon Woods 3-yard run (Matt Williams kick), 5:55. Red Raiders 28–14. Drive: 12 plays, 66 yards, 6:42.
- TTU – Eric Morris 10-yard pass from Graham Harrell (Matt Williams kick), 2:15. Red Raiders 35–14. Drive: 5 plays, 38 yards, 2:40.

Third quarter

- TTU – Graham Harrell 1-yard run (Matt Williams kick), 8:23. Red Raiders 42–14. Drive: 13 plays, 80 yards, 6:37.
- TTU – Michael Crabtree 16-yard pass from Graham Harrell (Matt Williams kick), 5:05. Red Raiders 49–14. Drive: 7 plays, 43 yards, 3:10.
- TTU – Shannon Woods 1-yard run (Matt Williams kick), 2:42. Red Raiders 56–14. Drive: 6 plays, 47 yards, 1:53.

Fourth quarter

- TTU – Adam Jones 10-yard pass from Taylor Potts (Matt Williams kick), 11:12. Red Raiders 63–14. Drive: 5 plays, 45 yards, 1:36.
- KU – Jocques Crawford 1-yard run (Jacob Branstetter kick), 3:52. Red Raiders 63–21. Drive: 16 plays, 80 yards, 7:20.

Top passers

- TTU – Graham Harrell – 34/42, 386 yards, 5 TD
- KU – Todd Reesing – 16/26, 154 yards, 2 TD, 3 INT

Top rushers

- TTU – Shannon Woods – 14 rushes, 79 yards, 2 TD
- KU – Jake Sharp – 13 rushes, 80 yards

Top receivers

- TTU – Edward Britton – 3 receptions, 106 yards, TD
- KU – Kerry Meier – 6 receptions, 70 yards, TD

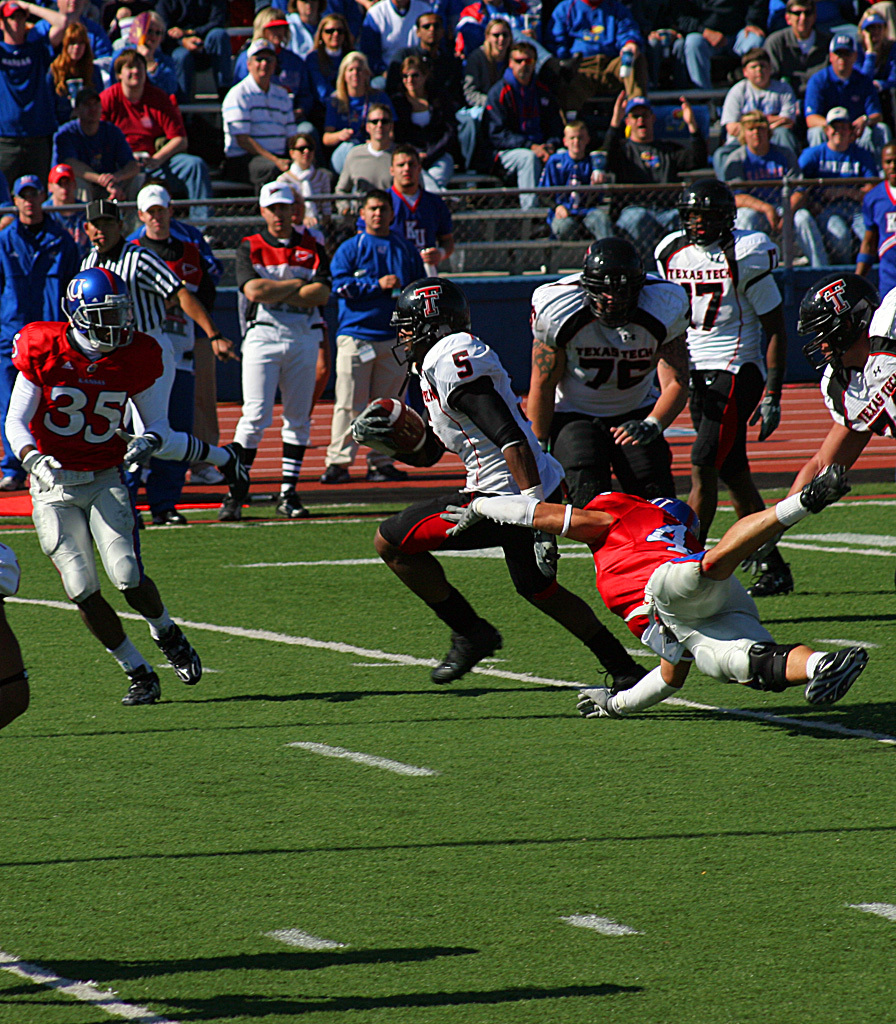
Tech's Michael Crabtree running after a catch during the game against Kansas

Texas Tech placekicker Matt Williams made his debut during the game. Williams came to the attention of Coach Mike Leach when he kicked a 30-yard field goal during a halftime contest at the game versus UMass. Following Tech's victory over Kansas, Williams was recognized as the AT&T ESPN All-America Player of the Week.

=== Texas ===
No. 1 Texas Longhorns at No. 6 Texas Tech Red Raiders – Game summary

Quarter	1	2	3	4	Total
No. 1 Longhorns	0	6	13	14	33
No. 6 Red Raiders	12	10	7	10	39

at Jones AT&T Stadium, Lubbock, Texas

- Date: November 1
- Game time: 7:00 p.m.
- Game weather: Temperature: 79 °F (26 °C) • Weather: Clear • Wind: S 11 MPH
- Game attendance: 56,333
- Referee: Karl Richins
- TV announcers (ABC): Brent Musburger (play-by-play) and Kirk Herbstreit (analyst)
- Box score, Recap

Game information

First quarter

- TTU – Chris Ogbonnaya tackled in end zone by Colby Whitlock, 10:38. Red Raiders 2–0.
- TTU – Matt Williams 29-yard field goal, 6:47. Red Raiders 5–0. Drive: 11 plays, 52 yards, 3:51.
- TTU – Baron Batch 3-yard run (Matt Williams kick), 0:00. Red Raiders 12–0. Drive: 10 plays, 96 yards, 4:19.

Second quarter

- TTU – Eric Morris 18-yard pass from Graham Harrell (Matt Williams kick), 9:39. Red Raiders 19–0. Drive: 8 plays, 83 yards, 3:16.
- TEX – Hunter Lawrence 43-yard field goal, 5:27. Red Raiders 19–3. Drive: 6 plays, 3 yards, 3:16.
- TTU – Matt Williams 31-yard field goal, 1:37. Red Raiders 22–3. Drive: 8 plays, 46 yards, 3:50.
- TEX – Hunter Lawrence 25-yard field goal, 0:00. Red Raiders 22–6. Drive: 10 plays, 72 yards, 1:37.

Third quarter

- TEX – Jordan Shipley 45-yard punt return (Hunter Lawrence kick), 10:26. Red Raiders 22–13
- TTU – Daniel Charbonnet 18-yard interception return (Matt Williams kick), 7:33. Red Raiders 29–13.
- TEX – Malcolm Williams 37-yard pass from Colt McCoy (pass failed), 0:12. Red Raiders 29–19. Drive: 6 plays, 58 yards, 2:26.

Fourth quarter

- TEX – Malcolm Williams 91-yard pass from Colt McCoy (Hunter Lawrence kick), 11:00. Red Raiders 29–26. Drive: 1 play, 91 yards, 0:14.
- TTU – Donnie Carona 42-yard field goal, 5:45. Red Raiders 32–26. Drive: 13 plays, 55 yards, 5:15.
- TEX – Vondrell McGee 4-yard run (Hunter Lawrence kick), 1:29. Longhorns 33–32. Drive: 11 plays, 80 yards, 4:16.
- TTU – Michael Crabtree 28-yard pass from Graham Harrell (Donnie Carona kick), 0:01. Red Raiders 39–33. Drive: 6 plays, 62 yards, 1:28.

Top passers

- TEX – Colt McCoy – 20/34, 294 yards, 2 TD, INT
- TTU – Graham Harrell – 36/53, 474 yards, 2 TD

Top rushers

- TEX – Fozzy Whittaker – 6 rushes, 42 yards
- TTU – Shannon Woods – 15 rushes, 71 yards

Top receivers

- TEX – Malcolm Williams – 4 receptions, 182 yards, 2 TD
- TTU – Edward Britton – 7 receptions, 139 yards

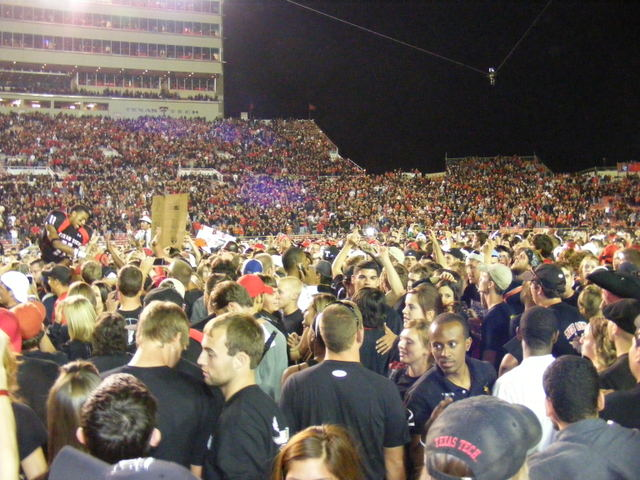
Students and fans rush the field after the #7 Red Raiders upset the #1 Longhorns

The series between Texas Tech and Texas originated in Austin in 1928 and the two teams have met annually since 1960. Texas led the series 43–14 entering the game, with the Red Raiders last win coming in a 42–38 upset of the #3 Longhorns in Lubbock in 2002. In the 2006 contest, #5 Texas narrowly came away with a 35–31 win over an unranked Texas Tech team at Jones AT&T Stadium. In the 2007 game, #14 Texas won 59–43.

On the day of the game, ESPN's College GameDay broadcast from Lubbock for the first time.

=== Oklahoma State ===
No. 8 Oklahoma State Cowboys at No. 2 Texas Tech Red Raiders – Game summary

Quarter	1	2	3	4	Total
No. 8 Cowboys	7	7	6	0	20
No. 2 Red Raiders	14	14	14	14	56

at Jones AT&T Stadium, Lubbock, Texas

- Date: November 8
- Game time: 7:00 p.m.
- Game weather: Temperature: 61 °F (16 °C) • Weather: Clear • Wind: S 9 MPH
- Game attendance: 55,663
- Referee: Scott Novak
- TV: ABC
- Box score, Recap

Game information

First quarter

- OKST – Kendall Hunter 2-yard run (Dan Bailey kick), 12:30. Cowboys 7–0. Drive: 3 plays, 31 yards, 0:58.
- TTU – Edward Britton 16-yard pass from Graham Harrell (Matt Williams kick), 10:12. Tied 7–7. Drive: 5 plays, 80 yards, 2:18.
- TTU – Eric Morris 4-yard pass from Graham Harrell (Matt Williams kick), 3:38. Red Raiders 14–7. Drive: 11 plays, 70 yards, 4:06.

Second quarter

- TTU – Michael Crabtree 9-yard pass from Graham Harrell (Matt Williams kick), 10:56. Red Raiders 21–7. Drive: 14 plays, 97 yards, 6:47.
- OKST – Keith Toston 2-yard run (Dan Bailey kick), 4:13. Red Raiders 21–14. Drive: 12 plays, 80 yards, 6:43.
- TTU – Shannon Woods 3-yard run (Matt Williams kick), 0:47. Red Raiders 28–14. Drive: 8 plays, 72 yards, 3:26.

Third quarter

- TTU – Michael Crabtree 8-yard pass from Graham Harrell (Matt Williams kick), 9:23. Red Raiders 35–14. Drive: 9 plays, 48 yards, 3:41.
- OKST – Kendall Hunter 4-yard run (run failed), 7:39. Red Raiders 35–20. Drive: 5 plays, 76 yards, 1:53.
- TTU – Michael Crabtree 1-yard pass from Graham Harrell (Matt Williams kick), 4:05. Red Raiders 42–20. Drive: 8 plays, 80 yards, 3:34.

Fourth quarter

- TTU – Shannon Woods 13-yard pass from Graham Harrell (Matt Williams kick), 8:52. Red Raiders 49–20. Drive: 12 plays, 96 yards, 5:17.
- TTU – Shannon Woods 16-yard pass from Taylor Potts (Matt Williams kick), 2:31. Red Raiders 56–20. Drive: 7 plays, 74 yards, 3:09.

Top passers

- OKST – Zac Robinson – 16/28, 182 yards, INT
- TTU – Graham Harrell – 40/50, 456 yards, 6 TD

Top rushers

- OKST – Kendall Hunter – 17 rushes, 112 yards, 2 TD
- TTU – Baron Batch – 11 rushes, 79 yards

Top receivers

- OKST – Dez Bryant – 4 receptions, 86 yards
- TTU – Eric Morris – 10 receptions, 97 yards, TD

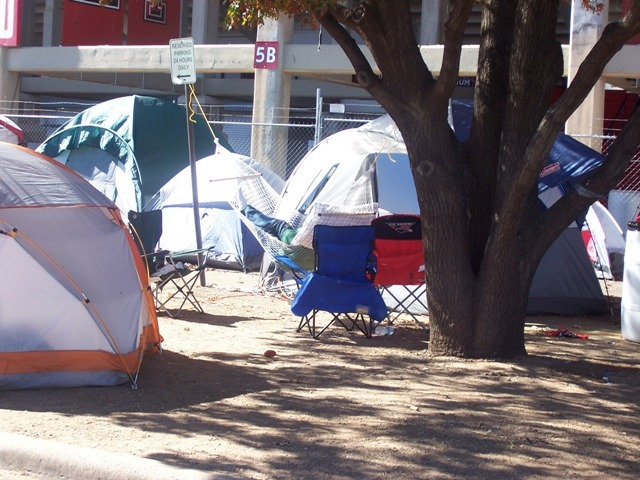
Students camped out in Raiderville prior to the game against Oklahoma State.

Texas Tech and Oklahoma State first played in 1935. Coming into the game, the Red Raiders led the series over the Cowboys, 20–12–3. Oklahoma State last won in 2007 in Stillwater, 49–45, in a game that came down to the final possession. However, the Cowboys had not won in Lubbock since 1944. Texas Tech would not defeat Oklahoma State again until the 2018 season.

=== At Oklahoma ===
No. 2 Texas Tech Red Raiders at No. 5 Oklahoma Sooners – Game summary

Quarter	1	2	3	4	Total
No. 2 Red Raiders	0	7	7	7	21
No. 5 Sooners	7	35	16	7	65

at Gaylord Family Oklahoma Memorial Stadium, Norman, Oklahoma

- Date: November 22
- Game time: 7:00 p.m.
- Game weather: Temperature: 48 °F (9 °C) • Weather: Partly cloudy • Wind: SE 12 MPH
- Game attendance: 85,646
- Referee: Karl Richins
- TV announcers (ABC): Brent Musburger (play-by-play), Kirk Herbstreit (analyst) and Lisa Salters (sideline)
- Box score, Recap

Game information

First quarter

- OKLA – DeMarco Murray 1-yard run (Jimmy Stevens kick), 8:59. Sooners 7–0. Drive: 10 plays, 73 yards, 3:35.

Second quarter

- OKLA – Chris Brown 3-yard run (Jimmy Stevens kick), 14:29. Sooners 14–0. Drive: 6 plays, 76 yards, 1:44.
- OKLA – Jermaine Gresham 19-yard pass from Sam Bradford (Jimmy Stevens kick), 10:58. Sooners 21–0. Drive: 5 plays, 84 yards, 1:17.
- OKLA – Juaquin Iglesias 28-yard pass from Sam Bradford (Jimmy Stevens kick), 7:45. Sooners 28–0. Drive: 5 plays, 55 yards, 1:46.
- TTU – Tramain Swindall 25-yard pass from Graham Harrell (Matt Williams kick), 6:28. Sooners 28–7. Drive: 4 plays, 57 yards, 1:17.
- OKLA – Chris Brown 4-yard run (Jimmy Stevens kick), 1:04. Sooners 35–7. Drive: 12 plays, 80 yards, 5:24.
- OKLA – DeMarco Murrary 1-yard run (Jimmy Stevens kick), 0:18. Sooners 42–7. Drive: 1 play, 1 yard, 0:03.

Third quarter

- OKLA – Jimmy Stevens 33-yard field goal, 11:11. Sooners 45–7. Drive: 8 plays, 19 yards, 3:49.
- OKLA – Chris Brown 2-yard run (Jimmy Stevens kick), 9:07. Sooners 52–7. Drive: 2 plays, 56 yards, 0:33.
- TTU – Eric Morris 11-yard pass from Graham Harrell (Matt Williams kick), 5:39. Sooners 52–14. Drive: 9 plays, 60 yards, 3:28.
- OKLA – Manuel Johnson 66-yard pass from Sam Bradford (kick failed), 1:38. Sooners 58–14. Drive: 4 plays, 87 yards, 1:40.

Fourth quarter

- OKLA – Ryan Broyles 26-yard pass from Sam Bradford (Jimmy Stevens kick), 13:54. Sooners 65–14. Drive: 4 plays, 38 yards, 1:00.
- TTU – Detron Lewis 27-yard pass from Graham Harrell (Matt Williams kick), 0:11. Sooners 65–21. Drive: 12 plays, 99 yards, 4:37.

Top passers

- TTU – Graham Harrell – 33/55, 361 yards, 3 TD, INT
- OKLA – Sam Bradford – 14/19, 304 yards, 4 TD

Top rushers

- TTU – Baron Batch – 8 rushes, 47 yards
- OKLA – DeMarco Murray – 18 rushes, 125 yards, 2 TD

Top receivers

- TTU – Detron Lewis – 5 receptions, 71 yards, TD
- OKLA – Jermaine Gresham – 5 receptions, 95 yards, TD

Texas Tech and Oklahoma first played in 1992. Coming into the game, the Sooners led the series 11–4–0 though the Red Raiders had won 2 of the last 3 with the last loss coming in Norman in 2006. The only road game Tech had won in the series was during the inaugural season of the Big 12 in 1996. Under head coach Bob Stoops, the Sooners had lost only two games at home. The Sooners are 7-point favorites.

The Red Raiders opened the game with a kickoff return to their 32-yard line. The Sooners forced a punt, and fielded their offense at their 27. The Sooners scored a touchdown with 8:59 left in the first. DeMarco Murray contributed 48 rushing yards in the drive. Tech returned the ensuing kickoff to their 22, and a Sooner personal foul after the return gave the Red Raiders 15 yards. Texas Tech lost 10 of those yards due to a delay of game and a false start. Starting at their 27, the Red Raiders were stopped at the Oklahoma 48, where they punted again. The Sooners got the ball on their 20. On the second play of the drive, Oklahoma was punished again with a 15-yard penalty. After three failed attempts to pass the ball for a first down, the Sooners elected to make their first punt. On the next Tech possession, Graham Harrell was sacked on two consecutive plays, once by Adrian Taylor and the other by Gerald McCoy. Coming into the game, the Red Raiders ranked second in the nation in sacks allowed, with only 5. The Sooners ended the first quarter with a 42-yard reception by tight end Jermaine Gresham and two rushes by Chris Brown for a combined 12 yards.

Once the second quarter commenced, both Brown and Gresham moved the ball for a touchdown on three different plays. Tech started their next drive at their own 38 and advanced the ball through the air to eventually get to the Oklahoma 15. Two incompletions caused the Red Raiders to face a 4th-and-3. Tech decided to go for it. Woods was unable to catch a pass by Harrell to convert and Tech turned the ball over on downs. Murray rushed the ball for 23 yards on Oklahoma's first play of the drive. Murray followed with a 31-yard reception, which put the ball on the Tech 30. After two rushes by Brown, Gresham scored a touchdown on a 19-yard catch, and the subsequent extra point extended the Sooners lead to 21–0. Oklahoma's defense forced Tech to four plays on the next drive, with the fourth play being a 4th-and-4, Tech's second 4th down conversion attempt. With 9:31 remaining, Oklahoma completed a 1:44 scoring drive, which was capped by Juaquin Iglesias' 28-yard scoring reception. On the following possession, the Red Raiders reached the end zone, thanks to Harrell's 25-yard throw to Tramain Swindall. Matt Williams' extra point brought the score to 28–7. With 6:28 left in the half, Oklahoma began to drain the clock using their running game. The Sooners eventually scored on the 12th play of the drive. Once Tech got the ball, about a minute was left on the clock. On the second play, Harrell threw an interception to Travis Lewis, who returned the ball 47 yards. Tech offensive guard Brandon Carter, who stopped Lewis at the Tech 1, received a personal foul. Murray scored on a 1-yard rush to increase the Sooners' lead to 42–7. Tech got the ball again after the Sooner touchdown with 18 seconds remaining in the game. Harrell threw a shovel pass to Baron Batch, who ran 21 yards to the Tech 28. The half ended with Tech receiving a 16-yard personal foul. The Red Raiders left the field facing their biggest deficit of the season (35 points).

Tech attempted an onside kick to start off the second half, though the Sooners grabbed the ball at the Tech 34. OU ended the drive on a 33-yard field goal. Tech fumbled on their next possession, Oklahoma's Keenan Clayton recovered the fumble and return it 53 yards to the Tech 3. The Sooners added another 7 points to extend their lead to 52–7. Tech cranked up its passing game on its next possession, eventually scoring a touchdown and extra point with 5:39 remaining in the third quarter. On the subsequent drive, the Red Raider defense forced their first sack on Bradford, and also forced the Sooners to punt. The Sooner defense countered in the next drive by forcing a three-and-out. The Sooner offense then added another score on a 66-yard reception by Manuel Johnson. The Tech defense blocked the extra point, and the score remained at 58–14.

In the fourth quarter, Tech failed to convert another fourth down, producing another turnover. Oklahoma scored immediately afterwards, improving their lead to 65–14. On the next possession, Tech was able to make three pass completions of at least 12 yards, though on the final play of the drive, Harrell lost the ball to the Sooners on a sack. With 10:50 left in the game, the Sooners started to run out the clock. The Red Raiders stopped them from scoring on a 4th down from the 1. Tech got the ball back with 4:48 on the clock. After a few plays, Tech faced another 4th down, and this time was able to convert it with a 13-yard throw to Crabtree. Tech later score their third touchdown with 11 seconds left, and Williams tacked on the extra point to change the score to 65–21. Tech attempted an onside kick and recovered the ball. The final play was a short-yard catch by Woods.

Since the Sooners won, Tech, Texas, and OU all tied for first in the division at 6–1. All three teams won their regular season finales to tie again at 7–1, the highest ranked team in the BCS standings earned a spot in the Big 12 Championship game. Sports columnists also stated that the quarterback of the winning team would be the front runner for the Heisman Trophy.

=== Baylor ===
Baylor Bears at No. 7 Texas Tech Red Raiders – Game summary

Quarter	1	2	3	4	Total
Bears	13	8	7	0	28
No. 7 Red Raiders	7	7	7	14	35

at Jones AT&T Stadium, Lubbock, Texas

- Date: November 29
- Game time: 2:30 p.m.
- Game weather: Temperature: 53 °F (12 °C) • Weather: Sunny Wind: NNW 15 MPH
- Game attendance: 53,470
- Referee: Greg Burks
- TV: Versus
- Box score, Recap

Game information

First quarter

- TTU – Eric Morris 6-yard pass from Graham Harrell (Matt Williams kick), 10:29. Red Raiders 7–0. Drive: 14 plays, 60 yards, 4:31.
- BAY – Robert Griffin III 1-yard run (Ben Parks kick), 3:13. Tied 7–7. Drive: 14 plays, 52 yards, 7:16.
- BAY – Robert Griffin III 13-yard run (kick failed), 0:07. Bears 13–7. Drive: 4 plays, 34 yards, 1:33.

Second quarter

- TTU – Baron Batch 1-yard run (Matt Williams kick), 7:18. Red Raiders 14–13. Drive: 16 plays, 72 yards, 7:49.
- BAY – Ernest Smith 1-yard pass from Robert Griffin III (Robert Griffin III pass to Kendall Wright), 0:01. Bears 21–14. Drive: 6 plays, 16 yards, 1:26.

Third quarter

- BAY – Jacoby Jones 1-yard run (Ben Parks kick), 11:04. Bears 28–14. Drive: 9 plays, 78 yards, 3:56.
- TTU – Shannon Woods 1-yard run (Matt Williams kick), 5:52. Bears 28–21. Drive: 14 plays, 72 yards, 5:12.

Fourth quarter

- TTU – Baron Batch 3-yard run (Matt Williams kick), 12:20. Tied 28–28. Drive: 12 plays, 90 yards, 5:33.
- TTU – Detron Lewis 4-yard pass from Graham Harrell (Matt Williams kick), 6:14. Red Raiders 35–28. Drive: 7 plays, 38 yards, 3:18.

Top passers

- BAY – Robert Griffin III – 12/15, 91 yards, TD, INT
- TTU – Graham Harrell – 41/50, 309 yards, 2 TD, INT

Top rushers

- BAY – Jay Finley – 15 rushes, 105 yards
- TTU – Shannon Woods – 11 rushes, 43 yards, TD

Top receivers

- BAY – Thomas White – 4 receptions, 39 yards
- TTU – Detron Lewis – 9 receptions, 68 yards, TD

Two of Tech's starters on the secondary were unable to play in the game. Tech scored on the first possession of the game. The Bears countered on the ensuing drive, in which they scored on a 1-yard quarterback sneak by Robert Griffin. On the next drive, Harrell's pass got intercepted on third down, and Antonio Johnson returned the interception for four yards to the Tech 34. After a few plays, Griffin soon scored a 13-yard rushing touchdown. Baylor's kicker Ben Parks missed the extra point, keeping the Baylor lead at 13–7 by the end of the first quarter.

At the start of the second quarter, the Tech offensive line gave up another sack on Harrell, which cost them 10 yards. The Red Raiders, however, were able to complete the drive with a touchdown to regain their lead at 14–13. On the second to last play of the drive, Michael Crabtree injured his right ankle with about four minutes left in the half. Crabtree's right ankle twisted as he got tackled while making a 6-yard reception at the Baylor 1-yard line. Crabtree hobbled to the Tech bench, and was later taken to the locker room on a cart. He did not return for the second half. Baylor was forced to kick a field goal on their next possession, though Parks missed it from 29 yards. Once Tech got the ball back again, Harrell got sacked on the second play of the drive, and lost the ball in the process. Baylor recovered the fumble and fielded their offense at the Tech 16. Griffin led his team to another scoring drive, which ended on a successful two-point conversion. Baylor left the field leading 21–14 at halftime.

The Bears opened the third quarter with a 9-play 78-yard offensive drive that produced another touchdown. The longest play was running back Jay Finley's 47-yard rush. On their next drive, the Red Raiders scored again, though still trailed 28–14. Early on in the drive, Antonio Johnson sacked Harrell and forced a fumble, but running back Baron Batch was able to recover the fumble.

The Red Raiders compiled 7 points with 12:20 remaining in the game. On Baylor's next drive, Tech intercepted the ball at the Baylor 38. They soon converted the interception into a touchdown. On Baylor's final possession, which lasted 5 plays, Griffin was sacked twice. The second sack occurred on a fourth down, which caused the Bears to turn the ball over on downs. Tech ran out the clock and preserved their 35–28 victory.

=== Vs. Ole Miss (Cotton Bowl Classic) ===
No. 20 Ole Miss Rebels vs. No. 8 Texas Tech Red Raiders (Cotton Bowl Classic) – Game summary

Quarter	1	2	3	4	Total
No. 20 Rebels	7	17	14	9	47
No. 8 Red Raiders	14	7	0	13	34

at Cotton Bowl, Dallas, Texas

- Date: January 2, 2009
- Game time: 1:00 p.m.
- Game weather: Temperature: 68 °F (20 °C) • Weather: Clear • Wind: SSW 7 MPH
- Game attendance: 88,175
- Referee: Jay Stricherz
- TV announcers (Fox): Pat Summerall (play-by-play), Brian Baldinger (analyst) and Krista Voda (sideline)
- Box score, Recap

Game information

First quarter

- TTU – Edward Britton 35-yard pass from Graham Harrell (Matt Williams kick), 6:31. Red Raiders 7–0. Drive: 4 plays, 61 yards, 1:30.
- TTU – Darcel McBath 45-yard interception return (Matt Williams kick), 5:22. Red Raiders 14–0.
- MISS – Gerald Harris 8-yard pass from Jevan Snead (Joshua Shene kick), 1:49. Red Raiders 14–7. Drive: 8 plays, 78 yards, 3:33.

Second quarter

- MISS – Mike Wallace 41-yard pass from Jevan Snead (Joshua Shene kick), 11:57. Tied 14–14. Drive: 10 plays, 85 yards, 3:35.
- TTU – Michael Crabtree 2-yard pass from Graham Harrell (Matt Williams kick), 7:44. Red Raiders 21–14. Drive: 11 plays, 75 yards, 4:13.
- MISS – Gerald Harris 21-yard pass from Jevan Snead (Joshua Shene kick), 4:09. Tied 21–21. Drive: 9 plays, 80 yards, 3:35.
- MISS – Joshua Shene 27-yard field goal, 1:08. Rebels 24–21. Drive: 6 plays, 35 yards, 1:46.

Third quarter

- MISS – Marshay Green 65-yard interception return (Joshua Shene kick), 12:12. Rebels 31–21.
- MISS – Brandon Bolden 17-yard run (Joshua Shene kick), 6:55. Rebels 38–21. Drive: 3 plays, 40 yards, 1:08.

Fourth quarter

- TTU – Edward Britton 12-yard pass from Graham Harrell (Matt Williams kick), 12:13. Rebels 38–28. Drive: 9 plays, 83 yards, 3:31.
- MISS – Graham Harrell sacked in end zone by Patrick Trahan, 10:02. Rebels 40–28.
- MISS – Dexter McCluster 4-yard run (Joshua Shene kick), 4:43. Rebels 47–28. Drive: 9 plays, 48 yards, 5:28.
- TTU – Eric Morris 17-yard pass from Graham Harrell (run failed), 1:37. Rebels 47–34. Drive: 7 plays, 62 yards, 2:57.

Top passers

- MISS – Jevan Snead – 18/29, 292 yards, 3 TD, INT
- TTU – Graham Harrell – 36/58, 364 yards, 4 TD, 2 INT

Top rushers

- MISS – Brandon Bolden – 11 rushes, 101 yards, TD
- TTU – Shannon Woods – 6 rushes, 46 yards

Top receivers

- MISS – Dexter McCluster – 6 receptions, 83 yards
- TTU – Eric Morris – 10 receptions, 89 yards, TD

The Red Raiders were defeated by the Ole Miss Rebels in the 2009 AT&T Cotton Bowl Classic in Dallas, Texas on January 2, 2009. The Red Raiders and the Rebels have met in bowl games twice before: the 1986 Independence Bowl and the 1998 Independence Bowl, with Ole Miss winning both. The teams also met during the 2002 and 2003 regular seasons with Texas Tech winning both games of the home-and-home series.

== Rankings ==
Ranking movements Legend: ██ Increase in ranking ██ Decrease in ranking ( ) = First-place votes
	Week																
Poll	Pre	1	2	3	4	5	6	7	8	9	10	11	12	13	14	15	Final
AP	12	12	12	11	10	7	7	7	8	6	2 (12)	2 (21)	2 (21)	7	8	8	12
Coaches	14	13	12	10	9	8	7	5	6	5	3 (6)	2 (15)	2 (17)	8	8	8	12
Harris	Not released					8	7	7	7	5	3 (16)	2 (38)	2 (32)	7	7	8	Not released
BCS	Not released								8	7	2	2	2	7	7	7	Not released

== Statistics ==
=== Team ===
==== Scores by quarter ====
	1	2	3	4	OT	Total
Texas Tech	139	148	122	120	6	535
Opponents	68	106	62	79	0	315
