= Crossett School District =

School district in Arkansas, United States

Address
- 219 Main Street Crossett, Arkansas, 71635; United States

District information
- Type: Public
- Grades: PreK–12
- NCES District ID: 0504800

Students and staff
- Students: 1,663
- Teachers: 126.13
- Staff: 117.78
- Student–teacher ratio: 13.18

Other information
- Website: www.crossettschools.org

Crossett School District is a school district headquartered in Crossett in Ashley County, Arkansas. In addition to Crossett it serves West Crossett and most of North Crossett.

The district operates Crossett Elementary School, Crossett Middle School, and Crossett High School.
