= Keith Kidd =

American football player (born 1962)

No. 80, 44
- Position: Wide receiver

Personal information
- Born: September 10, 1962 (age 64); Crossett, Arkansas, U.S.
- Listed height: 6 ft 1 in (1.85 m)
- Listed weight: 195 lb (88 kg)

Career information
- High school: Crossett
- College: Arkansas
- NFL draft: 1984: 9th round, 235th overall pick

Career history
- Minnesota Vikings (1984–1985); Buffalo Bills (1986)*; Minnesota Vikings (1987)
- * Offseason or practice squad member only
- Stats at Pro Football Reference

Keith Darryl Kidd (born September 10, 1962) is an American former professional football wide receiver who played one season with the Minnesota Vikings of the National Football League (NFL). He was selected by the Vikings in the ninth round of the 1984 NFL draft. He played college football at the University of Arkansas.

== Early life and college ==
Keith Darryl Kidd was born on September 10, 1962, in Crossett, Arkansas. He attended Crossett High School in Crossett.

Kidd played for the Arkansas Razorbacks from 1980 to 1983, recording 517 receiving yards and four touchdowns on 24 receptions.

== Professional career ==
Kidd was selected by the Minnesota Vikings with the 235th pick in the 1984 NFL draft. He was signed by the team on August 1, 1984. He was placed on injured reserve with a pulled hamstring on August 27, 1985. Kidd played in one game for the Vikings during the 1987 season.

== Post-football career ==
Kidd owns and operates KDK's Chicken and Waffles in Fayetteville, Arkansas.
