= Crossett, Arkansas =

City in Arkansas, United States

- City
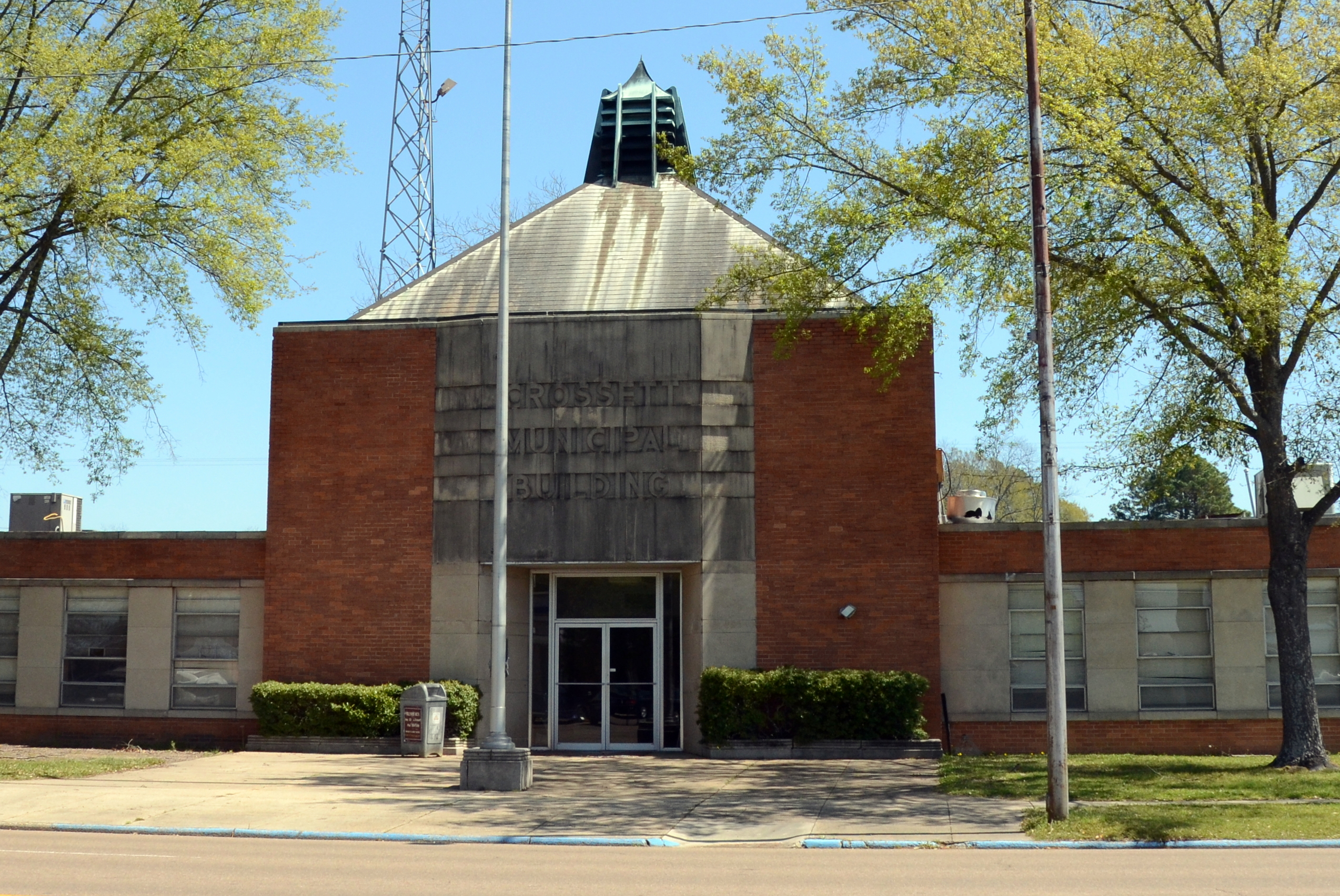
- Crossett Municipal Building
- Nickname: Forestry Capital of the South
- Location of Crossett in Ashley County, Arkansas.
- Coordinates: 33°07′29″N 91°57′38″W
- Country: United States
- State: Arkansas
- County: Ashley

Area
  - Total: 5.96 sq mi (15.44 km^{2})
  - Land: 5.79 sq mi (15.00 km^{2})
  - Water: 0.17 sq mi (0.43 km^{2})
- Elevation: 167 ft (51 m)

Population (2020)
  - Total: 4,822
  - Estimate (2025): 4,454 ▼
  - Density: 832.4/sq mi (321.41/km^{2})
- Time zone: UTC-6 (Central (CST))
  - Summer (DST): UTC-5 (CDT)
- ZIP code: 71635
- Area code: 870
- FIPS code: 05-16240
- GNIS feature ID: 2404159
- Website: cityofcrossettar.gov

Crossett is the largest city in Ashley County, Arkansas, United States, with a population of 4,822 in 2020. Combined with North Crossett and West Crossett, the population is 8,722. Crossett was incorporated in 1903.

There are four properties on Main Street in Crossett listed on the National Register of Historic Places, as well as the Crossett Experimental Forest, located 7 mi (11 km) south.

== History ==
Edward Savage Crossett (1828–1910) moved to Davenport, Iowa in 1875. He became a member of the trading firm of Renwick, Shaw and Crossett. In 1882, Crossett made his first investment in a southern pine forest. In 1886 he sold his interest in the Renwick business, taking 10,000 acres of Arkansas land covered in yellow pines in payment. With fellow Iowans Charles Warner Gates and Dr. John Wenzel Watzek as investors in 1899, the Crossett Lumber Company was organized. Crossett was elected vice president of the society at its organizational meeting. Charles Gates' brother, Edgar Woodward "Cap" Gates, was sent to southern Arkansas to oversee construction of the mills and a new community, which his associates named in honor of Edward Savage Crossett.

The Crossett Lumber Company was established in 1899 with a small sawmill. The sawmill had a main steam engine, boiler, and heavy metal drive shafts and pulleys for sawing logs and lumber. The Mississippi River, Hamburg and Western Railroad (MRH&WR) reached Crossett on May 7, 1902. The first large pine mill began operation in 1902. The company built houses, schools and churches for the workers and their families. In 1903, all of this was incorporated as the company town of Crossett. The second large pine mill opened in 1905. By 1904, the Crossett Lumber Company had built the new village of Crossett for its workforce. The Chicago, Rock Island and Pacific Railroad (CRI&PR) reached Crossett on March 10, 1907. The Arkansas, Louisiana and Gulf Railroad (AL&GR) reached Crossett on October 1, 1908.

In 1937, the Crossett Lumber Company built the paper mill. By 1960, the Crossett Lumber Company had opened a kraft paper mill, a food carton factory, and a flakeboard factory that made sheets of boards used much like plywood.

The Crossett Lumber Company merged with the Georgia-Pacific Company in 1962.

== Geography ==
According to the United States Census Bureau, the city has a total area of 6.0 square miles (16 km^{2}), of which 5.8 square miles (15 km^{2}) is land and 0.2 square miles (0.52 km^{2}) (2.83%) is water.

=== Climate ===
The climate in this area is characterized by hot, humid summers and generally mild to cool winters. According to the Köppen Climate Classification system, Crossett has a humid subtropical climate, abbreviated "Cfa" on climate maps.

Climate data for Crossett, Arkansas (1991–2020 normals, extremes 1915–1919, 1928–present)
Month	Jan	Feb	Mar	Apr	May	Jun	Jul	Aug	Sep	Oct	Nov	Dec	Year
Record high °F (°C)	87 (31)	88 (31)	92 (33)	95 (35)	98 (37)	108 (42)	113 (45)	108 (42)	106 (41)	103 (39)	90 (32)	87 (31)	113 (45)
Mean maximum °F (°C)	73.9 (23.3)	77.1 (25.1)	82.9 (28.3)	86.6 (30.3)	90.3 (32.4)	94.9 (34.9)	98.6 (37.0)	99.6 (37.6)	96.4 (35.8)	90.1 (32.3)	81.6 (27.6)	75.7 (24.3)	100.5 (38.1)
Mean daily maximum °F (°C)	57.1 (13.9)	61.6 (16.4)	70.0 (21.1)	77.6 (25.3)	84.8 (29.3)	91.6 (33.1)	94.6 (34.8)	94.9 (34.9)	90.0 (32.2)	79.9 (26.6)	68.0 (20.0)	59.3 (15.2)	77.4 (25.2)
Daily mean °F (°C)	45.6 (7.6)	49.2 (9.6)	56.9 (13.8)	64.5 (18.1)	72.8 (22.7)	80.2 (26.8)	83.4 (28.6)	82.9 (28.3)	77.1 (25.1)	66.0 (18.9)	55.1 (12.8)	47.9 (8.8)	65.1 (18.4)
Mean daily minimum °F (°C)	34.1 (1.2)	36.8 (2.7)	43.9 (6.6)	51.4 (10.8)	60.8 (16.0)	68.8 (20.4)	72.3 (22.4)	70.9 (21.6)	64.1 (17.8)	52.1 (11.2)	42.2 (5.7)	36.4 (2.4)	52.8 (11.6)
Mean minimum °F (°C)	16.5 (−8.6)	21.3 (−5.9)	26.2 (−3.2)	33.4 (0.8)	44.4 (6.9)	57.5 (14.2)	62.9 (17.2)	60.9 (16.1)	47.6 (8.7)	34.1 (1.2)	24.3 (−4.3)	20.7 (−6.3)	14.5 (−9.7)
Record low °F (°C)	−3 (−19)	−9 (−23)	11 (−12)	23 (−5)	35 (2)	43 (6)	49 (9)	50 (10)	33 (1)	22 (−6)	12 (−11)	0 (−18)	−9 (−23)
Average precipitation inches (mm)	5.52 (140)	5.51 (140)	5.37 (136)	5.65 (144)	4.98 (126)	3.67 (93)	4.23 (107)	3.62 (92)	3.60 (91)	4.29 (109)	4.44 (113)	5.79 (147)	56.67 (1,439)
Average snowfall inches (cm)	0.2 (0.51)	0.1 (0.25)	0.0 (0.0)	0.0 (0.0)	0.0 (0.0)	0.0 (0.0)	0.0 (0.0)	0.0 (0.0)	0.0 (0.0)	0.0 (0.0)	0.0 (0.0)	0.0 (0.0)	0.3 (0.76)
Average precipitation days (≥ 0.01 in)	9.1	8.4	8.9	7.2	8.0	7.0	7.0	6.3	5.5	5.7	6.8	8.7	88.6
Average snowy days (≥ 0.1 in)	0.2	0.2	0.0	0.0	0.0	0.0	0.0	0.0	0.0	0.0	0.0	0.0	0.4
Source: NOAA

== Demographics ==
Historical population
Census	Pop.	Note	%±
1910	2,038		—
1920	2,707		32.8%
1930	2,811		3.8%
1940	4,891		74.0%
1950	4,619		−5.6%
1960	5,370		16.3%
1970	6,191		15.3%
1980	6,706		8.3%
1990	6,282		−6.3%
2000	6,097		−2.9%
2010	5,507		−9.7%
2020	4,822		−12.4%
2025 (est.)	4,454	▼	−7.6%
U.S. Decennial Census; 2014 Estimate

=== 2020 census ===
Crossett racial composition
Race	Num.	Perc.
White (non-Hispanic)	2,450	50.81%
Black or African American (non-Hispanic)	2,059	42.7%
Native American	9	0.19%
Asian	24	0.5%
Pacific Islander	2	0.04%
Other/Mixed	140	2.9%
Hispanic or Latino	138	2.86%

As of the 2020 census, Crossett had a population of 4,822. The median age was 42.2 years. 23.8% of residents were under the age of 18 and 21.8% of residents were 65 years of age or older. For every 100 females, there were 84.9 males, and for every 100 females age 18 and over, there were 80.3 males age 18 and over. There were 1,243 families residing in the city.

100.0% of residents lived in urban areas, while 0.0% lived in rural areas.

There were 2,071 households in Crossett, of which 28.9% had children under the age of 18 living in them. Of all households, 39.1% were married-couple households, 18.0% were households with a male householder and no spouse or partner present, and 38.5% were households with a female householder and no spouse or partner present. About 34.0% of all households were made up of individuals, and 17.4% had someone living alone who was 65 years of age or older.

There were 2,403 housing units, of which 13.8% were vacant. The homeowner vacancy rate was 3.9% and the rental vacancy rate was 12.1%.

=== 2000 census ===
As of the census of 2000, there were 6,097 people, 2,418 households, and 1,745 families residing in the city. The population density was 1,045.2 inhabitants per square mile (403.6/km^{2}). There were 2,663 housing units at an average density of 456.5 per square mile (176.3/km^{2}). The racial makeup of the city was 59.50% White, 39.02% Black or African American, 0.07% Native American, 0.46% Asian, 0.02% Pacific Islander, 0.30% from other races, and 0.64% from two or more races. 1.10% of the population were Hispanic or Latino of any race.

There were 2,418 households, out of which 31.9% had children under the age of 18 living with them, 52.4% were married couples living together, 16.3% had a female householder with no husband present, and 27.8% were non-families. 25.6% of all households were made up of individuals, and 12.8% had someone living alone who was 65 years of age or older. The average household size was 2.48 and the average family size was 2.96.

In the city, the population was spread out, with 26.5% under the age of 18, 7.8% from 18 to 24, 25.4% from 25 to 44, 24.1% from 45 to 64, and 16.2% who were 65 years of age or older. The median age was 38 years. For every 100 females, there were 87.4 males. For every 100 females age 18 and over, there were 82.9 males.

The median income for a household in the city was $31,193 in 2015. Males had a median income of $43,698 versus $32,149 for females. The per capita income for the city was $18,288. About 13.7% of families and 16.8% of the population were below the poverty line, including 29.1% of those under age 18 and 12.0% of those age 65 or over.

== Economy ==
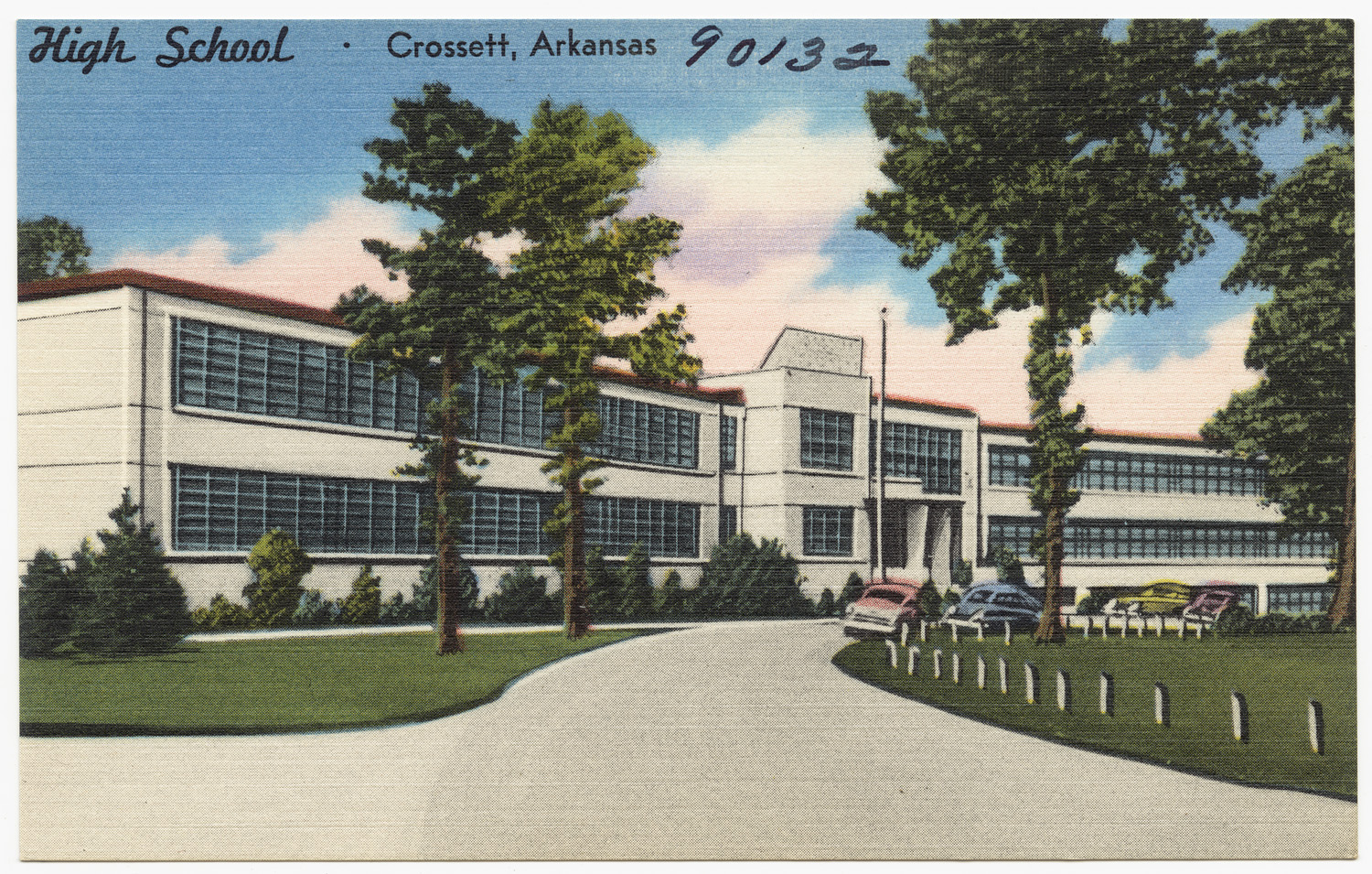
Drawing of high school in Crossett

A major employer in the town is the Georgia-Pacific paper mill, a subsidiary of Koch Industries. Toxic waste from the plant includes carcinogens and other chemicals that have polluted local waterways and allegedly harmed the heath of residents. A documentary film (Company Town) on the paper mill and the environment in Crossett was released in September 2017.

On June 4, 2019, Georgia-Pacific announced it would permanently close one of its plants at the Crossett mill. Some 555 people were expected to be affected.

== Notable people ==
- Gretha Boston, actress
- Jessie Clark, former NFL player
- Jeremy Evans, professional basketball player
- James D. Johnson, former Chief Justice of the Arkansas Supreme Court
- Keith Kidd, former football player for the Minnesota Vikings
- Bryant Nelson, former baseball player for the Boston Red Sox
- K. T. Oslin, country singer and songwriter
- Rylan Reed, All-American offensive tackle at Texas Tech
- Barry Switzer, football player and coach
