= Rylan Reed =

American football and baseball player (born 1981)

No. 74
- Position: Offensive tackle
- Class: Senior

Personal information
- Born: November 18, 1981 (age 44); Dallas, Texas, U.S.
- Listed height: 6 ft 7 in (2.01 m)
- Listed weight: 305 lb (138 kg)

Career information
- High school: Crossett High School, (Crossett, Arkansas)
- College: Texas Tech (2005–2008)

Awards and highlights
- First-team All-American (2008); First-team All-Big 12 (2008)

Rylan Robert Reed (born November 18, 1981) is an American former football and baseball player. He played minor league baseball as a pitcher in the Chicago White Sox organization from 2001 to 2005. After undergoing treatment for cancer, Reed enrolled at Texas Tech University and played college football from 2005 to 2008. He was selected as a first-team All-American offensive tackle in 2008.

== Early years and baseball ==
Born in Clute, Texas, Reed attended Crossett High School in Crossett, Arkasas. He was a three sport star in high school, playing a tight end and defensive end in football, Center in basketball, and as a pitcher with a 95-mile per hour fastball for the baseball team. He was drafted by the Chicago White Sox in the 2000 Major League Baseball June Amateur Draft and was also recruited by Houston Nutt to play college football for the Arkansas Razorbacks. The White Sox paid him a $550,000 signing bonus, and Reed opted for baseball.

He spent four years from 2001 to 2004 playing minor league baseball as a pitcher in the White Sox organization. He compiled a 3–0 record and a 2.44 earned run average in 2002. During his minor league career, his fastball was clocked at 98 miles per hour. He was named the White Sox's "organizational pitcher of the year." Brandon McCarthy, who played with Reed in 2002, recalled, "He would intimidate the hell out of you. He had muscles coming out of muscles. That was a sight.

== Cancer and recovery ==
In 2003, Reed was diagnosed with non-Hodgkin's lymphoma and underwent surgery to remove a tumor and three feet of his intestines. After several months of chemotherapy, Reed lost 30 pounds. When he recovered from the cancer treatment, his father was killed in an automobile accident. He returned to the White Sox in 2004, shortly after the death of his father, but his earned run average soared to 14.54 in five games for the Great Falls White Sox.

== College football ==
After retiring from baseball in 2004, Reed enrolled at Texas Tech University, where he played college football. He began as a tight end as a freshman in 2005, before being moved to offensive tackle. After gaining 60 pounds, he became a starter for Texas Tech in 2007 and 2008. Reed set a Texas Tech record in 2008 with a 625-pound bench press.

In 2008, Reed recalled having pitched to Barry Bonds during spring training in Tucson, Arizona. Bonds hit a fly ball to shallow right field for an out, prompting the Houston Chronicle to note: "That itself makes Reed arguably a one-man fraternity — possibly the only offensive lineman in college or pro football history able to claim an out against baseball's home run king."

After the 2008 season, Reed was selected as a first-team All-American by both the Walter Camp Football Foundation and SI.com.

== Awards and honors ==
- 2007 All-Big 12 honorable mention
- 2008 All-Big 12 second team
- 2008 Associated Press All-Big 12 first team
- 2008 Walter Camp Football Foundation first-team All-America
- 2008 SI.com first-team All-America
