= North Crossett, Arkansas =

- CDP
- Location in Ashley County and the state of Arkansas
- Coordinates: 33°10′15″N 91°56′12″W
- Country: United States
- State: Arkansas
- County: Ashley

Area
  - Total: 10.46 sq mi (27.09 km^{2})
  - Land: 10.43 sq mi (27.02 km^{2})
  - Water: 0.027 sq mi (0.07 km^{2})
- Elevation: 167 ft (51 m)

Population (2020)
  - Total: 2,756
  - Density: 264.2/sq mi (101.99/km^{2})
- Time zone: UTC-6 (Central (CST))
  - Summer (DST): UTC-5 (CDT)
- ZIP code: 71635
- Area code: 870
- FIPS code: 05-50240
- GNIS feature ID: 2403346

North Crossett is a census-designated place (CDP) in Ashley County, Arkansas, United States. Per the 2020 census, the population was 2,756.

== Geography ==
According to the United States Census Bureau, the CDP has a total area of 10.3 square miles (27 km^{2}), of which 10.3 square miles (27 km^{2}) is land and 0.04 square miles (0.10 km^{2}) (0.29%) is water.

== Demographics ==
Historical population
| Census | Pop. | Note | %± |
|---|---|---|---|
| 2010 | 3,119 | | — |
| 2020 | 2,756 | | −11.6% |
U.S. Decennial Census; 2010 2020

=== Racial and ethnic composition ===
North Crossett CDP, Arkansas – Demographic Profile (NH = Non-Hispanic) Note: the US Census treats Hispanic/Latino as an ethnic category. This table excludes Latinos from the racial categories and assigns them to a separate category. Hispanics/Latinos may be of any race.
| Race / Ethnicity | Pop 2010 | Pop 2020 | % 2010 | % 2020 |
|---|---|---|---|---|
| White alone (NH) | 2,602 | 2,118 | 83.42% | 79.39% |
| Black or African American alone (NH) | 405 | 406 | 12.98% | 14.73% |
| Native American or Alaska Native alone (NH) | 10 | 0 | 0.32% | 0.00% |
| Asian alone (NH) | 8 | 4 | 0.26% | 0.15% |
| Pacific Islander alone (NH) | 1 | 0 | 0.03% | 0.00% |
| Some Other Race alone (NH) | 0 | 3 | 0.00% | 0.11% |
| Mixed Race/Multi-Racial (NH) | 28 | 90 | 0.90% | 3.27% |
| Hispanic or Latino (any race) | 65 | 65 | 2.08% | 2.36% |
| Total | 3,119 | 2,756 | 100.00% | 100.00% |

=== 2020 census ===
As of the 2020 census, North Crossett had a population of 2,756. The median age was 43.2 years. 22.6% of residents were under the age of 18 and 19.7% of residents were 65 years of age or older. For every 100 females there were 96.4 males, and for every 100 females age 18 and over there were 93.7 males age 18 and over.

75.6% of residents lived in urban areas, while 24.4% lived in rural areas.

There were 1,178 households in North Crossett, of which 26.7% had children under the age of 18 living in them. Of all households, 43.9% were married-couple households, 21.7% were households with a male householder and no spouse or partner present, and 28.9% were households with a female householder and no spouse or partner present. About 32.4% of all households were made up of individuals and 12.6% had someone living alone who was 65 years of age or older.

There were 1,336 housing units, of which 11.8% were vacant. The homeowner vacancy rate was 1.2% and the rental vacancy rate was 11.8%.

=== 2000 census ===
As of the census of 2000, there were 3,581 people, 1,422 households, and 1,045 families residing in the CDP. The population density was 348.4 inhabitants per square mile (134.5/km^{2}). There were 1,554 housing units at an average density of 151.2 per square mile (58.4/km^{2}). The racial makeup of the CDP was 87.69% White, 10.42% Black or African American, 0.25% Native American, 0.20% Asian, 0.14% Pacific Islander, 0.73% from other races, and 0.59% from two or more races. 2.04% of the population were Hispanic or Latino of any race.

There were 1,422 households, out of which 35.2% had children under the age of 18 living with them, 57.4% were married couples living together, 12.2% had a female householder with no husband present, and 26.5% were non-families. 23.5% of all households were made up of individuals, and 8.9% had someone living alone who was 65 years of age or older. The average household size was 2.52 and the average family size was 2.96.

In the CDP, the population was spread out, with 27.6% under the age of 18, 8.8% from 18 to 24, 29.6% from 25 to 44, 23.1% from 45 to 64, and 11.0% who were 65 years of age or older. The median age was 33 years. For every 100 females, there were 93.8 males. For every 100 females age 18 and over, there were 88.5 males.

The median income for a household in the CDP was $29,734, and the median income for a family was $35,682. Males had a median income of $34,146 versus $17,927 for females. The per capita income for the CDP was $14,945. About 14.1% of families and 18.6% of the population were below the poverty line, including 31.9% of those under age 18 and 21.0% of those age 65 or over.

== Education ==
Most of the North Crossett CDP is in the Crossett School District which operates Crossett High School. A portion is in the Hamburg School District, which operates Hamburg High School.
