= Bryant Nelson =

American baseball player (born 1974)

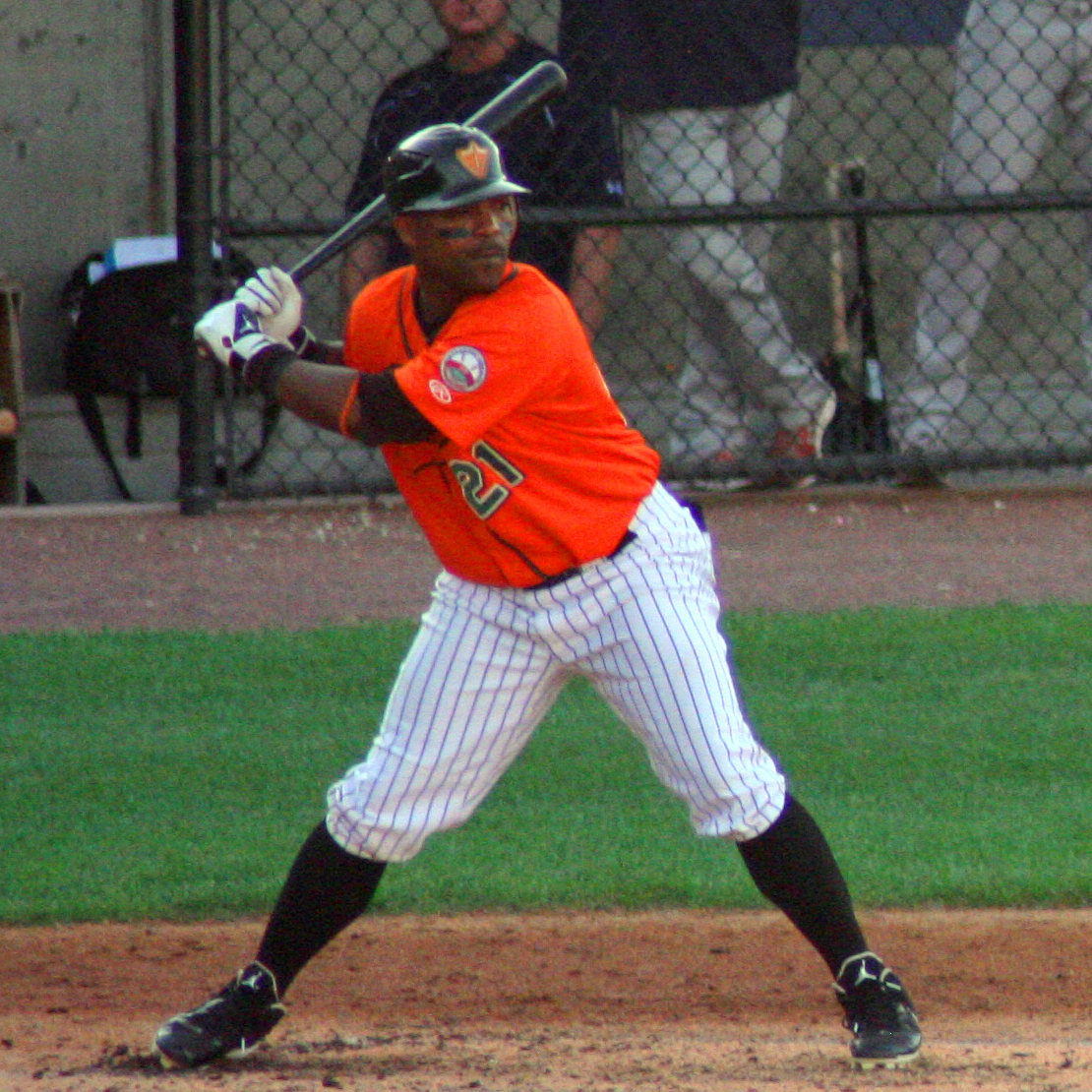
- Nelson with the Long Island Ducks in 2013
- Second baseman / Outfielder
- Born: January 27, 1974 (age 52); Crossett, Arkansas, U.S.
- Batted: Switch Threw: Right

Professional debut
- MLB: May 14, 2002, for the Boston Red Sox
- NPB: March 28, 2003, for the Fukuoka Daiei Hawks
- CPBL: April 26, 2006, for the Uni-President Lions

Last appearance
- MLB: July 15, 2002, for the Boston Red Sox
- NPB: July 5, 2003, for the Fukuoka Daiei Hawks
- CPBL: May 17, 2006, for the Uni-President Lions

MLB statistics
- Batting average: .265
- Runs: 6
- Hits: 9

NPB statistics
- Batting average: .228
- Runs: 18
- Hits: 38

CPBL statistics
- Batting average: .186
- Runs: 2
- Hits: 8
- Stats at Baseball Reference

Teams
- Boston Red Sox (2002); Fukuoka Daiei Hawks (2003); Uni-President Lions (2006)

Bryant "Cruther" Lawrence Nelson (born January 27, 1974) is an American former second baseman and outfielder. He played during one season for the Boston Red Sox of Major League Baseball (MLB).

== Career ==
Nelson was originally drafted by the San Francisco Giants as a pitcher in 1992 out of Crossett High School in the 19th round. Nelson was drafted by the Houston Astros in the 44th rounds as a draft and follow in the 1993 amateur draft out of Texarkana College as a short stop. Nelson, played his first professional season with their Class A (Short Season) Auburn Astros in 1994 hitting .322 in his second year switch hitting. 1995 he hit .327 with 3 Homeruns 52 RBI and 34 Doubles. He only struck out 40 times in 395 at bats. and his last affiliated season in 2005 with the Toronto Blue Jays' Triple-A club, the Syracuse SkyChiefs. In 2008, he played for four different teams: the New Jersey Jackals of the Can-Am League, the Long Island Ducks of the Atlantic League, and the Sultanes de Monterrey and Piratas de Campeche in the Mexican League.

Nelson was signed by the Camden Riversharks of the Atlantic League on May 30, 2009, batting .300 for them that season. He signed with the Lancaster Barnstormers for the 2010 season.

On June 2, 2016, Bryant Nelson became a member of the Atlantic League 1,000 Hit Club registering his 1,000 league hit off Somerset pitcher Darin Gorski and joining only 2 other players (Jeff Nettles/Ray Navarrete) to achieve this milestone in Atlantic League history.

Bryant Nelson is currently the head coach at Bo Porter Academy, where he works alongside Anaheim Angels 1st base coach, Bo Porter.
