= West Crossett, Arkansas =

- CDP
- Location in Ashley County and the state of Arkansas
- Coordinates: 33°08′28″N 92°00′35″W
- Country: United States
- State: Arkansas
- County: Ashley

Area
  - Total: 11.90 sq mi (30.83 km^{2})
  - Land: 11.89 sq mi (30.80 km^{2})
  - Water: 0.0077 sq mi (0.02 km^{2})
- Elevation: 112 ft (34 m)

Population (2020)
  - Total: 1,144
  - Density: 96.2/sq mi (37.14/km^{2})
- Time zone: UTC-6 (Central (CST))
  - Summer (DST): UTC-5 (CDT)
- ZIP code: 71635
- Area code: 870
- FIPS code: 05-74270
- GNIS feature ID: 2403000

West Crossett is a census-designated place (CDP) in Ashley County, Arkansas, United States. Per the 2020 census, the population was 1,144.

== Geography ==
According to the United States Census Bureau, the CDP has a total area of 11.9 square miles (31 km^{2}), of which 11.9 square miles (31 km^{2}) is land and 0.01 square miles (0.026 km^{2}) (.08%) is water.

== Demographics ==
Historical population
Census	Pop.	Note	%±
2010	1,256		—
2020	1,144		−8.9%
U.S. Decennial Census; 2010 2020

=== Racial and ethnic composition ===
West Crossett CDP, Arkansas – Demographic Profile (NH = Non-Hispanic) Note: the US Census treats Hispanic/Latino as an ethnic category. This table excludes Latinos from the racial categories and assigns them to a separate category. Hispanics/Latinos may be of any race.
Race / Ethnicity	Pop 2010	Pop 2020	% 2010	% 2020
White alone (NH)	794	730	63.22%	63.81%
Black or African American alone (NH)	419	359	33.36%	31.38%
Native American or Alaska Native alone (NH)	0	3	0.00%	0.26%
Asian alone (NH)	0	3	0.00%	0.17%
Pacific Islander alone (NH)	0	0	0.00%	0.00%
Some Other Race alone (NH)	0	9	0.00%	0.79%
Mixed Race/Multi-Racial (NH)	15	24	1.19%	2.10%
Hispanic or Latino (any race)	28	17	2.23%	1.49%
Total	1,256	1,144	100.00%	100.00%

=== 2020 census ===
As of the 2020 census, West Crossett had a population of 1,144. The median age was 45.2 years. 21.0% of residents were under the age of 18 and 21.4% were 65 years of age or older. For every 100 females, there were 81.6 males, and for every 100 females age 18 and over, there were 81.5 males age 18 and over.

23.7% of residents lived in urban areas, while 76.3% lived in rural areas.

There were 482 households, of which 25.7% had children under the age of 18 living in them. Of all households, 45.2% were married-couple households, 21.0% were households with a male householder and no spouse or partner present, and 29.0% were households with a female householder and no spouse or partner present. About 32.1% of all households were made up of individuals, and 14.4% had someone living alone who was 65 years of age or older.

There were 577 housing units, of which 16.5% were vacant. The homeowner vacancy rate was 2.3% and the rental vacancy rate was 6.3%.

=== 2000 census ===
As of the census of 2000, there were 1,664 people, 661 households, and 485 families residing in the CDP. The population density was 102.5 inhabitants per square mile (39.6/km^{2}). There were 774 housing units at an average density of 47.7 per square mile (18.4/km^{2}). The racial makeup of the CDP was 60.88% White, 36.72% Black or African American, 0.06% Native American, 0.06% Asian, 1.74% from other races, and 0.54% from two or more races. 3.06% of the population were Hispanic or Latino of any race.

There were 661 households, out of which 33.1% had children under the age of 18 living with them, 57.0% were married couples living together, 12.0% had a female householder with no husband present, and 26.5% were non-families. 22.8% of all households were made up of individuals, and 8.2% had someone living alone who was 65 years of age or older. The average household size was 2.52 and the average family size was 2.95.

In the CDP, the population was spread out, with 25.7% under the age of 18, 8.0% from 18 to 24, 27.3% from 25 to 44, 26.6% from 45 to 64, and 12.4% who were 65 years of age or older. The median age was 38 years. For every 100 females, there were 96.9 males. For every 100 females age 18 and over, there were 98.1 males.

The median income for a household in the CDP was $35,089, and the median income for a family was $37,763. Males had a median income of $34,500 versus $21,406 for females. The per capita income for the CDP was $15,759. About 9.5% of families and 11.7% of the population were below the poverty line, including 9.3% of those under age 18 and 12.0% of those age 65 or over.

== Education ==
The community is in the Crossett School District, which operates Crossett High School.
