= Russellville micropolitan area, Arkansas =

Russellville Micropolitan Area
- Micropolitan Statistical Area
- Russellville, AR Micropolitan Statistical Area
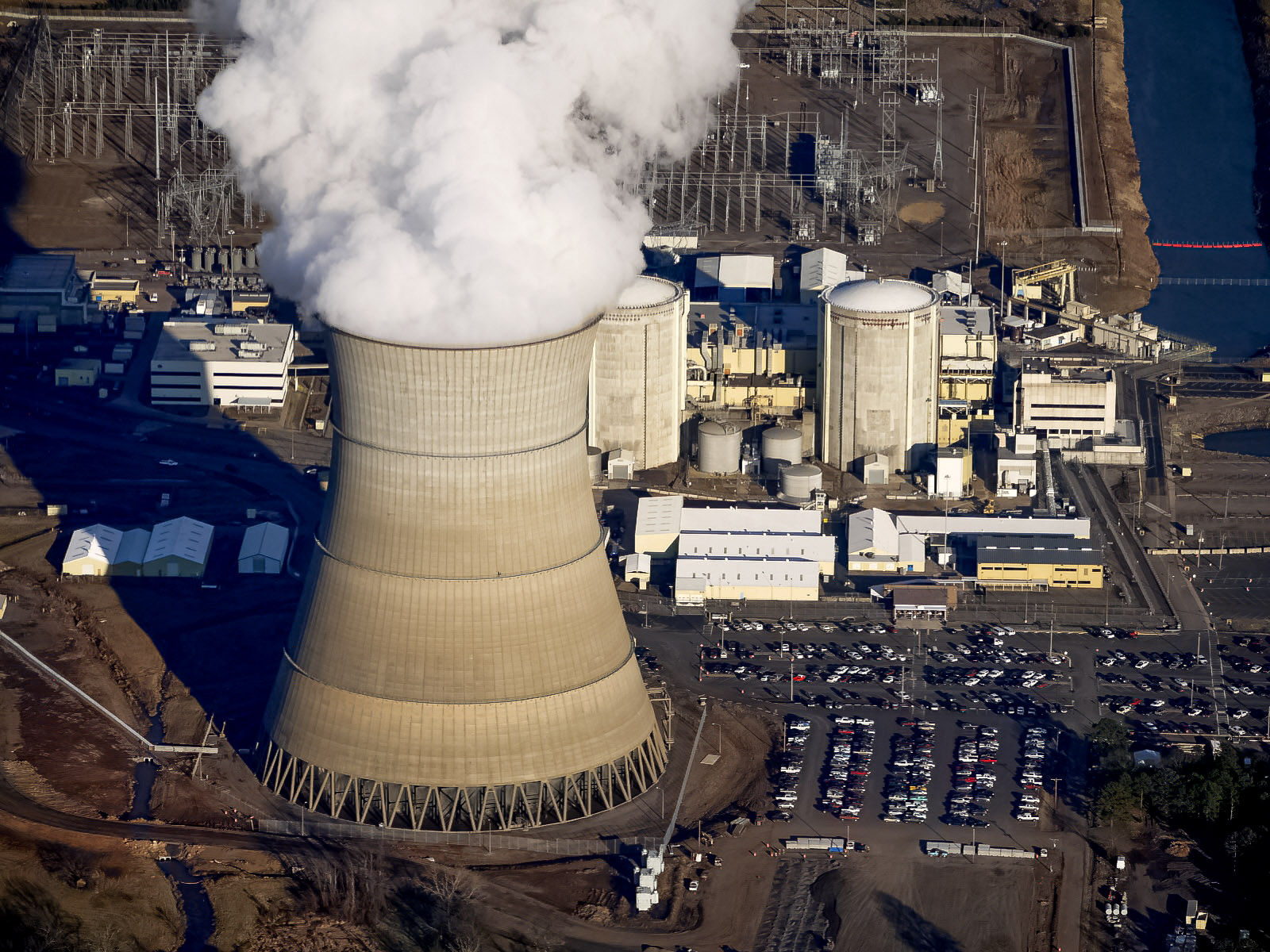
- Arkansas Nuclear One (February 2010)
Interactive Map of Russellville, AR μSA
City of Russellville
Russellville, AR μSA
- Country: United States
- State: Arkansas
- Largest city: Russellville
- Other city: Dardanelle; Pottsville; Atkins; Danville
- Time zone: UTC−6 (CST)
  - Summer (DST): UTC−5 (CDT)

The Russellville Micropolitan Statistical Area (μSA), as defined by the United States Census Bureau, is an area consisting of two counties in the U.S. state of Arkansas, anchored by the city of Russellville.

As of the 2010 census, the μSA had a population of 83,939.

== Counties ==
- Pope
- Yell

== Communities ==
=== Places with more than 25,000 inhabitants ===
- Russellville (Principal city)

=== Places with 2,000 to 5,000 inhabitants ===
- Dardanelle
- Pottsville
- Atkins
- Danville

=== Places with 500 to 1,500 inhabitants ===
- Dover
- Ola
- London
- Plainview

=== Places with less than 500 inhabitants ===
- Hector
- Belleville
- Havana
- Corinth

=== Unincorporated places ===
- Aly
- Augsburg
- Bluffton
- Centerville
- Gravelly
- Nogo
- Rover

== Demographics ==
As of the census of 2000, there were 75,608 people, 28,623 households, and 20,822 families residing within the μSA. The racial makeup of the μSA was 91.74% White, 2.29% African American, 0.65% Native American, 0.65% Asian, 0.03% Pacific Islander, 3.18% from other races, and 1.45% from two or more races. Hispanic or Latino of any race were 5.04% of the population.

The median income for a household in the μSA was $30,493, and the median income for a family was $36,232. Males had a median income of $26,543 versus $18,728 for females. The per capita income for the μSA was $15,651.

== See also ==
- Arkansas census statistical areas
