= List of places in Arkansas: A =

Arkansas State Seal

This list of current cities, towns, unincorporated communities, and other recognized places in the U.S. state of Arkansas whose name begins with the letter A. It also includes information on the number and names of counties in which the place lies, and its lower and upper zip code bounds, if applicable.

== Cities and Towns ==
Name of place	Number of counties	Principal county	Lower zip code	Upper zip code
Abbott	1	Scott County	72944	
Abco	1	Hot Spring County		
Aberdeen	1	Monroe County	72134	
Acorn	1	Polk County	71953	
Ada	1	Conway County	72001	
Adams Field	1	Pulaski County	72202	
Adona	1	Perry County	72001	
Advance	1	Baxter County		
Aetna	1	Craighead County		
Aggie	1	Craighead County		
Agnos	1	Fulton County	72513	
Agricultural School	1	Columbia County		
Air Base	1	Pulaski County	72076	
Airport Village	1	Jackson County		
Alabam	1	Madison County	72740	
Alamo	1	Montgomery County		
Albert	1	Montgomery County		
Albert Pike	1	Garland County	71913	
Albion	1	White County	72143	
Alco	1	Stone County	72610	
Alexander	1	Greene County	72450	
Alexander	2	Pulaski County	72002	
Alexander	2	Saline County	72002	
Alf	1	Montgomery County		
Alfrey	1	Monroe County	72021	
Algoa	1	Jackson County	72112	
Alicia	1	Lawrence County	72410	
Alix	1	Franklin County	72820	
Allbrook	1	Howard County	71851	
Alleene	1	Little River County	71820	
Allendale	1	Monroe County		
Allene	1	Little River County		
Allfriend	1	Newton County	72664	
Allis	1	Drew County		
Allison	1	Stone County	72511	
Allport	1	Lonoke County	72046	
Alma	1	Crawford County	72921	
Almond	1	Cleburne County	72550	
Almyra	1	Arkansas County	72003	
Alpena	2	Boone County	72611	
Alpena	2	Carroll County	72611	
Alpha	1	Yell County		
Alpine	1	Clark County	71920	
Alread	1	Van Buren County	72031	
Altheimer	1	Jefferson County	72004	
Alto	1	Poinsett County	72354	
Altus	1	Franklin County	72821	
Aly	1	Yell County	72857	
Amagon	1	Jackson County	72005	
Amanca	1	Crittenden County	72376	
Amboy	1	Pulaski County		
Ames	1	Nevada County		
Amity	1	Clark County	71920	
Amy	1	Ouachita County	71701	
Anderson	1	Scott County		
Anderson Tully	1	Poinsett County		
Andrews	1	White County		
Annieville	1	Lawrence County	72434	
Anthony	1	Hempstead County	71801	
Anthony Subdivision	1	Crittenden County		
Anthonyville	1	Crittenden County	72301	
Antioch	1	Craighead County		
Antioch	1	Hot Spring County		
Antioch	1	Perry County	72070	
Antioch	1	White County	72012	
Antoine	1	Pike County	71922	
Apalco	1	Lafayette County		
Apex	1	Sebastian County	72938	
Aplin	1	Perry County	72126	
Appleby	1	Washington County		
Applegate Ford	1	Carroll County		
Appleton	1	Pope County	72822	
Apt	1	Craighead County	72403	
Arbaugh	1	Newton County	72852	
Arbor Grove	1	Lawrence County	72433	
Arcadia	1	Hempstead County	71857	
Ard	1	Yell County	72834	
Arden	1	Little River County	71822	
Arkadelphia	1	Clark County	71923	
Arkalite	1	Lonoke County		
Arkana	1	Baxter County		
Arkansas A and M College	1	Drew County		
Arkansas City	1	Desha County	71630	
Arkansas Fuel Oil Company Village	1	Columbia County	71753	
Arkansas Polytechnic College	1	Pope County		
Arkansas Post National Memorial	1	Arkansas County	72055	
Arkansas State Teachers College	1	Faulkner County		
Arkawana	1	Baxter County		
Arkinda	1	Little River County	71836	
Arkola	1	Sebastian County	72945	
Arlberg	1	Stone County		
Armorel	1	Mississippi County	72310	
Armstrong	1	Sharp County	72482	
Armstrong Springs	1	White County	72148	
Arnett	1	Washington County		
Artesian	1	Calhoun County		
Artex	1	Miller County		
Arthur	1	Conway County	72156	
Artist Point	1	Crawford County		
Ashdown	1	Little River County	71822	
Asher	1	Madison County	72727	
Asher	1	Pulaski County	72204	
Ash Flat	2	Sharp County	72513	
Ash Flat	2	Fulton County	72513	
Ashton	1	Chicot County	71653	
Athelstan	1	Mississippi County	72370	
Athens	1	Howard County	71971	
Atkins	1	Pope County	72823	
Atlanta	1	Columbia County	71740	
Attica	1	Randolph County	72455	
Atwood	1	Howard County		
Aubrey	1	Lee County	72311	
Augsburg	1	Pope County	72874	
Augusta	1	Woodruff County	72006	
Aurelle	1	Union County	71765	
Aurora	1	Madison County	72740	
Austin	1	Conway County	72027	
Austin	1	Lonoke County	72007	
Austin Station	1	Lonoke County		
Auvergne	1	Jackson County	72112	
Avant	1	Garland County		
Avery	1	Lincoln County	71639	
Avilla	1	Saline County	72002	
Avoca	1	Benton County	72711	
Avon	1	Sevier County	71832	
Azor	1	Nevada County	71835	

== Townships ==
Name of place	Number of counties	Principal county	Lower zip code	Upper zip code
Acorn Township	1	Polk County		
Afton Township	1	Fulton County		
Alabam Township	1	Madison County		
Alabama Township	1	Nevada County		
Albany Township	1	Nevada County		
Albion Township	1	White County		
Alix Township	1	Franklin County		
Alma Township	1	Crawford County		
Amity Township	1	Clark County		
Anderson Township	1	Benton County		
Annieville Township	1	Lawrence County		
Antioch Township	1	Garland County		
Antioch Township	1	Hot Spring County		
Antioch Township	1	White County		
Antoine Township	1	Pike County		
Aplin Township	1	Perry County		
Apple Glenn Township	1	Benton County		
Arbana Township	1	Stone County		
Archey Valley Township	1	Van Buren County		
Arden Township	1	Little River County		
Arkansas Township	1	Arkansas County		
Arkinda Township	1	Little River County		
Ashland Township	1	Lawrence County		
Ashley Township	1	Independence County		
Athens Township	1	Izard County		
Auburn Township	1	Lincoln County		
Augusta Township	1	Woodruff County		
Austin Township	1	Conway County		
