= Antioch Township, Arkansas =

Antioch Township, Arkansas may refer to:

- Antioch Township, Hot Spring County, Arkansas
- Antioch Township, White County, Arkansas

== See also ==
- List of townships in Arkansas
- Antioch Township (disambiguation)
