= Fourche Valley School =

Location
- 18148 W Highway 28; Briggsville, Arkansas 72828; United States
- Coordinates: 34.944722°N 93.46437709999998°W

Information
- Type: Public K-12 school
- School district: Two Rivers School District (2004-2009); Fourche Valley School District (-2004)
- Website: https://web.archive.org/*/http://fourchevalley.k12.ar.us/

Fourche Valley School was a K-12 public school in unincorporated Yell County, Arkansas, near Briggsville. It had two divisions: Fourche Valley Elementary School (K-6) and Fourche Valley High School (7-12).

In 2004 Alan Richard of Education Week wrote that the school "is the only real sign of the Briggsville community, except for a few houses and the winding highway with a mountain view."

== History ==
It was originally a part of the Fourche Valley School District. On July 1, 2004, that district consolidated into the Two Rivers district, and Fourche Valley was the smallest school in the Two Rivers District. Around that year, several Fourche Valley teachers and former Fourche Valley School District superintendent Jack O'Reilly expressed fear that the newly-consolidated district would, in the event of a reduced budget, close their school.

In 2009 the school had 139 students. That year the majority of the members of the Two Rivers district board voted to close the Fourche Valley School. Area parents opposed the closure citing that their children had daily transportation times of three to four hours. The Arkansas Board of Education reviewed the closure as some board members did not support the closure and the school was geographically isolated. Parents lobbied the Arkansas Supreme Court but it too upheld the closure. Even though the Arkansas Board of Education stated the state supreme court had no jurisdiction, the decision clarified that it could review school closures. The state supreme court argued that the proper commute times to school should be a matter for the Arkansas Legislature to examine.

Students were rezoned to Plainview-Rover Elementary School and Plainview-Rover High School. In 2010 the latter closed due to the opening of the consolidated Two Rivers High School, and the Plainview-Rover elementary consolidated into Two Rivers Elementary in 2012.

== Campus ==
The campus had a distance-learning classroom; in 2004 it had widescreen televisions. The district's arena-style gymnasium, funded by a donor, had been built by 2004, and by that year it also had a new science laboratory. A single cafeteria served the students.

== Transportation ==
As of 2004 Jack O'Reilly stated that some students had school bus rides of two hours each way.
