= James H. McBride =

American businessman and Confederate general

James Haggin McBride
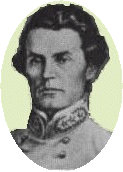
- James Haggin McBride
- Born: c. 1814; Mercer County, Kentucky
- Died: March 1864 (aged 49–50); Yell County, Arkansas
- Burial place: Bluffton Cemetery, Bluffton, Arkansas
- Military career
- Allegiance: Confederate States of America
- Branch: Missouri State Guard; Confederate States Army
- Service years: 1861–1864
- Rank: General (Missouri State Guard); Colonel (CSA)
- Conflicts: American Civil War: Battle of Wilson's Creek; First Battle of Lexington
- Other work: merchant, manufacturer, attorney

James Haggin McBride (c. 1814 – March 1864) was an American businessman, lawyer, banker, judge, legislator, and soldier. He served as a Confederate Missouri militia general during the American Civil War, later dying in the conflict from pneumonia in 1864 after being appointed a Colonel in the Confederate States Army, in which he was too ill to actively serve.

== Early life and career ==
James H. McBride was born in about 1814 near Harrodsburg, Kentucky. Upon reaching adulthood he relocated to Monroe County, Missouri, where he became a merchant and manufacturer in the city of Paris. McBride began to study law and was admitted to the bar association of Missouri, and also married Mildred A. Barnes, a resident of Cooper County.

McBride then moved his family to Springfield, where he founded a successful law practice. While there he also became president of the Springfield Bank. In 1850 McBride relocated to California, and in 1853 he returned to Missouri. He was elected to the Missouri Legislature, representing Texas County as a Democrat. In 1859 McBride moved to Houston, the county seat of Texas County, and in 1860 he was elected a circuit judge there.

== Civil War service and death ==
When the American Civil War began in 1861 McBride chose to follow the Confederate cause. While still a Texas County judge, McBride was informed he had been appointed a brigadier general in the Missouri State Guard and given command of its 7th Division, effective May 18. He had been appointed to the post by Claiborne F. Jackson, Missouri's governor.

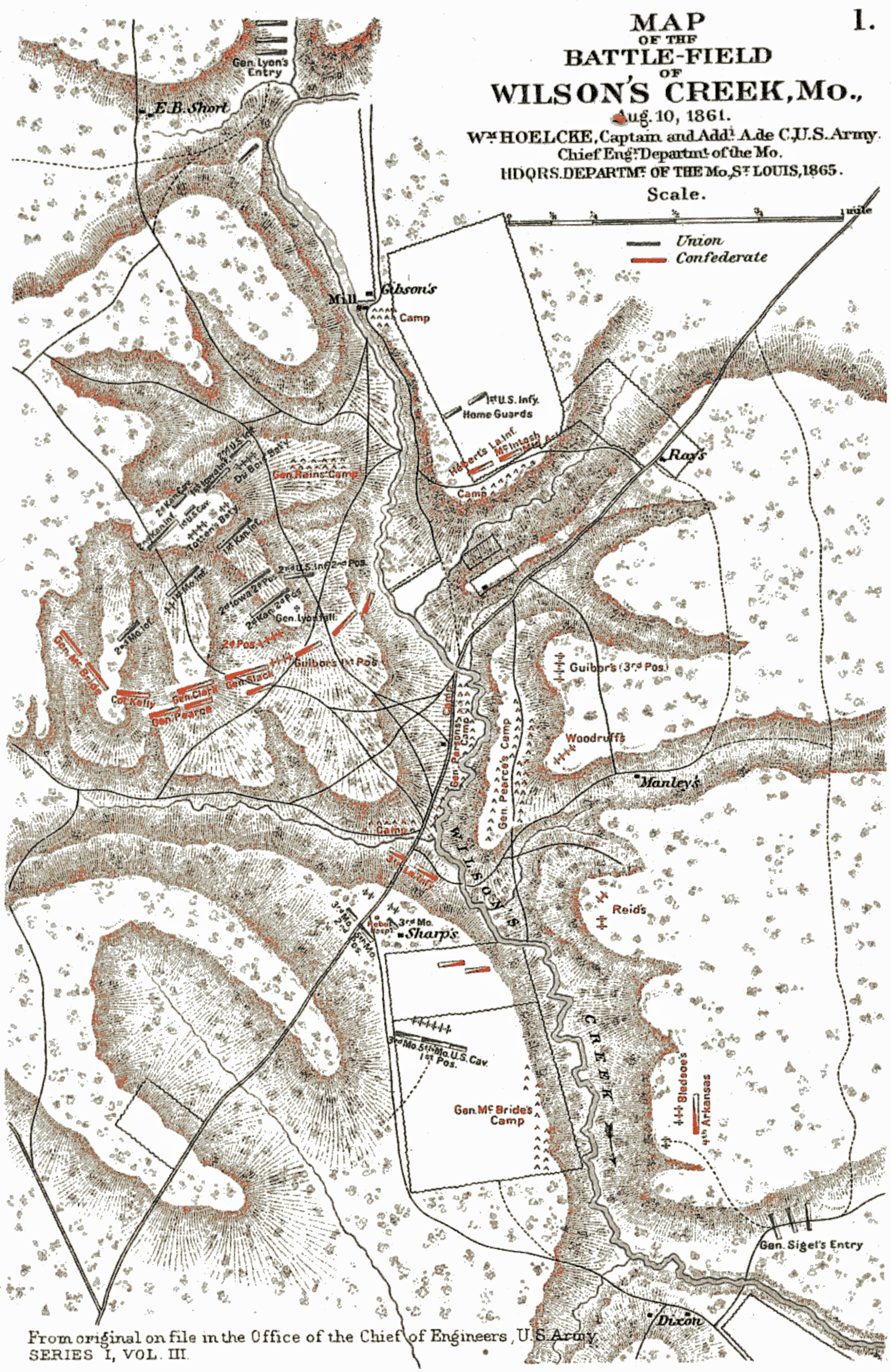
Battle of Wilson's Creek

On August 10 McBride and his men first saw action during the Battle of Wilson's Creek, fought near Springfield, Missouri. Although neither fully trained nor equipped, the 7th Division fought well in the battle and were praised by Maj. Gen. Sterling Price, the Missouri State Guard's commander. McBride's performance in the Confederate victory has been described as: "His 645 troops were in the thick of the fight on Bloody Hill, suffering 146 casualties. General McBride and his troops were mentioned for their gallant service by General Sterling Price following this action."

McBride next fought during the Siege of Lexington on September 13–20, 1861. His men were positioned along the Missouri River and attacked the Union Army garrison on September 18 and 20, where "General McBride and his troops were specifically mentioned for their bravery and gallant service." Early in 1862 much of the Missouri State Guard force was reorganized into two Confederate brigades and commanded by Brig. Gen. Daniel M. Frost. On January 23 any remaining soldiers were put under McBride's command and renamed Missouri's 3rd Brigade of Volunteers.

On February 16, 1862, McBride was captured by Union soldiers but was quickly exchanged. A week later on February 23 he resigned his commission from the state forces, hoping to become a brigadier general in the Confederate Army. However Price's opinion of McBride had changed because he "found fault with McBride's flouting of regulations and the lax discipline of his state guard division." McBride was then ordered to Arkansas to organize a new infantry brigade. Based in Izard County, he recruited in southwestern Missouri and northwestern Arkansas. Before he could accomplish this however, he was ordered to join Maj. Gen. Thomas C. Hindman, who was recruiting soldiers around Little Rock.

In 1863 McBride's health began to fail, forcing him to remain in Arkansas into 1864 even though the area had fallen under Union control. Although he was appointed a colonel in the Confederate Army in 1864, McBride was not fit for even recruiting duty and headed south with his family, hoping to recover his health. They left their home near Clarksville and got as far as Bluffton in Yell County before McBride became too ill from pneumonia to continue. He died in March and was buried in the town's cemetery in an unmarked grave.

== Legacy ==
The J.H. McBride Camp #632 of the Sons of Confederate Veterans was named in his honor. In 1958 McBride's family asked the U.S. Government for a headstone and placed it on his grave in Bluffton. Douglas, one of McBride's sons, also served in the Confederate Army as an infantry captain, and was killed in action at Batesville in Independence County, Arkansas.

== See also ==
- List of American Civil War generals (Acting Confederate)
