= Petit Jean River Bridge =

The Petit Jean River Bridge may refer to:

- Petit Jean River Bridge (Yell County, Arkansas)
- Petit Jean River Bridge (Logan County, Arkansas)
