= Fourche Valley School District =

Defunct school district in Arkansas, United States

Fourche Valley School District #13 was a school district headquartered in unincorporated Yell County, Arkansas, near Briggsville. Fourche Valley School or FVS (including Fourche Valley Elementary School and Fourche Valley High School) was its school, with the mascot being the Indians.

Former superintendent Jack O'Reilly previously served as a school principal in the Detroit metropolitan area and Phoenix metropolitan area, and originated from Michigan.

By 2004 new laws were passed requiring school districts with enrollments below 350 to consolidate with other school districts. Fourche Valley at first held negotiations with another area school district, and later asked the Arkansas Board of Education if it could consolidate with the Ola School District, which was merging into another district. Ola and the Perry-Casa School District had already agreed to consolidate, and the leadership of the Fourche Valley district wished to avoid a consolidation ordered by the state. On July 1, 2004, the Fourche Valley district merged into the Two Rivers School District.
