= Briggsville, Arkansas =

- Unincorporated community
- Location within Arkansas Location within the United States
- Coordinates: 34°56′02″N 93°29′40″W
- Country: United States
- State: Arkansas
- County: Yell
- Elevation: 440 ft (130 m)
- Time zone: UTC-6 (Central (CST))
  - Summer (DST): UTC-5 (CDT)
- ZIP code: 72828
- Area code: 479
- GNIS feature ID: 81846

Briggsville is an unincorporated community in Yell County, Arkansas, United States. Briggsville is located on Arkansas Highway 28, 12 miles (19 km) west-southwest of Plainview. Briggsville has a post office with ZIP code 72828.

In 2004 Alan Richard of Education Week wrote that the only notable features of Briggsville were the highway, some of its houses, and the Fourche Valley School.

Briggsville is the hometown of actor Jacob Lofland.

At a Democratic Party rally in Russellville, Arkansas in 1976, Bill Clinton spoke of "the breathtaking beauty of our Arkansas spring", and then listed several towns including Briggsville; "I know them all, and they are home to me because of you".

== Education ==
Two Rivers School District serves the area. It operates two schools: Two Rivers Elementary School and Two Rivers High School.

Previously it was assigned to the Fourche Valley School, a K-12 school, operated by the Fourche Valley School District. On July 1, 2004, the Fourche Valley district merged into the Two Rivers district. The merged district continued to operate the Fourche Valley School until 2009, when the majority of the members of the district board voted to close it. Students were reassigned to Plainview-Rover Elementary School and Plainview-Rover High School. In 2010 the latter closed due to the opening of the consolidated Two Rivers High School, and the Plainview-Rover elementary consolidated into Two Rivers Elementary in 2012.

== Notable people ==
- Bobby Crockett, American professional football player
