= Two Rivers School District =

School district in Arkansas, United States

Address
- 17727 East State Highway 28 Ola, Arkansas, 72857; United States

District information
- Type: Public
- Grades: PreK–12
- NCES District ID: 0500079

Students and staff
- Students: 829 (2020–2021)
- Teachers: 75.25 (on an FTE basis)
- Staff: 77.17 (on an FTE basis)
- Student–teacher ratio: 11.02:1

Other information
- Website: www.trgators.org

Two Rivers School District No. 10 is a public school district in Yell, Perry, and Conway counties, Arkansas, United States. Two Rivers, headquartered in an unincorporated area in Yell County near Ola, consists of two schools including Two Rivers Elementary and Two Rivers High; it previously operated Ola Elementary School/Ola High School, the Fourche Valley School, Perry-Casa Elementary/Perry-Casa High School, and Plainview–Rover Elementary School/Plainview–Rover High School.

The service area includes Ola, Plainview, Rover, Casa, Briggsville, Perry, Adona, Pontoon, Birta, and Centerville.

The school district and high school's name was chosen because of proximity to the Petit Jean River and Fourche La Fave River.

== History ==
The district was formed on July 1, 2004 as a result of the consolidation of four former school districts:

- Fourche Valley School District
- Ola School District
- Perry–Casa School District
- Plainview–Rover School District

By 2004 new laws were passed requiring school districts with enrollments below 350 to consolidate with other school districts. As a result the Perry-Casa and Ola boards agreed to have a consolidation in which Perry-Casa absorbs Ola, and voters of those districts approved the consolidation. Ola and Perry-Casa then notified the Fourche Valley and Plainview-Rover districts that they were merging; the leaderships of these two districts wished to avoid consolidations ordered by the state, so they asked the Arkansas Board of Education if they could voluntarily consolidate with Ola.

In the 2010–11 school year, the district served more than 900 students.

There was a proposed millage to pay for a safe room at Two Rivers Elementary, but it was voted down in 2017 by 59% of the voters. Perry County voters accused the district of attempting to prevent their vote by putting polling locations only in Yell County.

== Geography ==
Within Yell County the service area includes the municipalities of Ola and Plainview and the census-designated places of Centerville and Rover. The district also includes the unincorporated areas of Bluffton, Briggsville, Fourche Valley, Gravelly, and Wing in Yell County.

Within Perry County the service area includes Perry, Adona, and Casa. The district also includes sections of Conway County, and Scott County.

Briggsville is the westernmost area in the district, while the easternmost area is Perry. The east-west width of the district is 78 miles (126 km).

== Schools ==
Current:

- Two Rivers High School – serving grades 7 through 12; based in unincorporated Yell County.
- Two Rivers Elementary School – serving prekindergarten through grade 6; based in unincorporated Yell County.

Former:

- Fourche Valley Elementary School/Fourche Valley High School
- Ola High School
- Plainview–Rover High School
- Ola Elementary School – serving prekindergarten through grade 6; based in Ola.
  - Ola Elementary School had four buildings; the main building and gymnasium were made of natural rock and opened in 1941.
- Plainview–Rover Elementary School (later Plainview Elementary School) – serving prekindergarten through grade 6; based in Plainview.

In 2010 Ola High and Plainview-Rover High closed as Two Rivers High opened. In 2012 Ola Elementary and Plainview Elementary closed as Two Rivers Elementary opened.

The district previously operated the Fourche Valley School, which was K-12. In 2009 the majority of the members of the district board voted to close it. The Arkansas Board of Education and the Arkansas Supreme Court ultimately upheld the closure despite protests from Fourche Valley parents.

== Demographics ==
As of 2004 most district residents believe in Protestantism and are White Americans.

== Mascots ==
The current mascot of Two Rivers is the Gators.

Previously each campus has its own mascot that served as its athletic emblem (the same mascot was used for all grade levels of each campus):

- Ola = Mustangs
- Plainview–Rover = Panthers
- Fourche Valley = Indians
- Perry -Casa = Tigers
