= Antioch Township =

Antioch Township may refer to the following places in the United States:

- Antioch Township, Hot Spring County, Arkansas
- Antioch Township, White County, Arkansas
- Antioch Township, Lake County, Illinois
- Antioch Township, Michigan
