= Petit Jean River Bridge (Yell County, Arkansas) =

- Formerly listed on the U.S. National Register of Historic Places
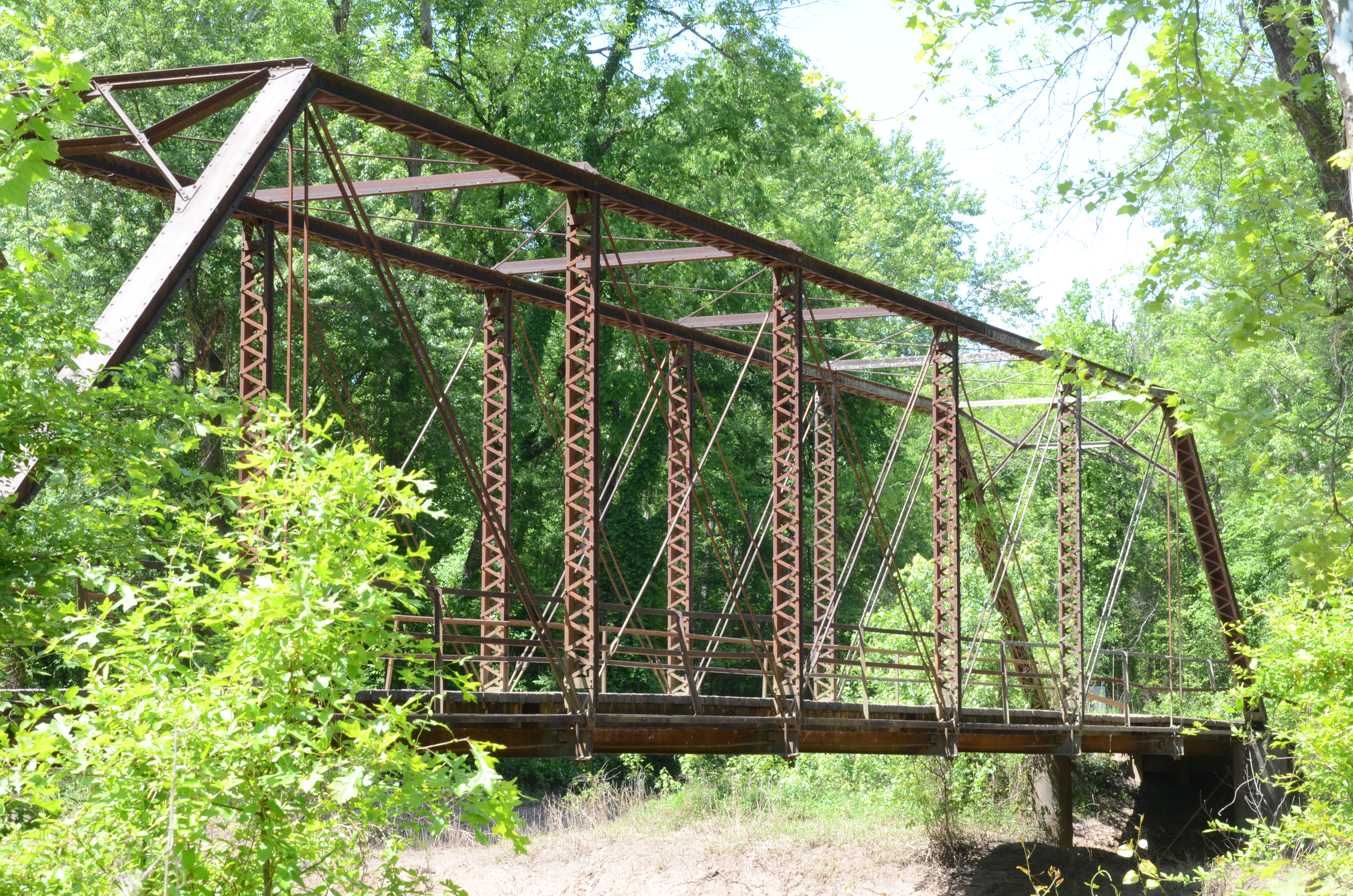

- Location within Arkansas Location within the United States
- Nearest city: Ola, Arkansas
- Coordinates: 35°4′43″N 93°14′29″W
- Area: less than one acre
- Built: 1930
- Built by: Vincennes Bridge Company
- Architectural style: Pratt Thru Truss
- MPS: Historic Bridges of Arkansas MPS
- NRHP reference No.: 09001263

Significant dates
- Added to NRHP: January 21, 2010
- Removed from NRHP: September 30, 2019

The Petit Jean River Bridge was a historic bridge in rural northeastern Yell County, Arkansas. It is located north of Ola, and carries County Road 49 across the Petit Jean River. It was a single-span Pratt through truss, with a truss length of 119 feet (36 m) long, and a total structure length of 159 feet (48 m). The trusses rest on concrete pillars. The bridge was 12 feet (3.7 m) wide, allowing for a single lane of traffic. Built in 1930, it was one of three Pratt truss bridges in the county. On February 1, 2019, the bridge was destroyed by an undertrained trucker who was unable to comprehend the clearly marked weight limits of the structure (15 tons)

The bridge was listed on the National Register of Historic Places in 2010, and was delisted in 2019.

== See also ==
- Petit Jean River Bridge (Logan County, Arkansas)
- National Register of Historic Places listings in Yell County, Arkansas
- List of bridges on the National Register of Historic Places in Arkansas
