= Two Rivers High School (Arkansas) =

Location
- 17727 Hwy 28 E Ola, Arkansas 72853; United States
- 35°0′34″N 93°16′23″W

Information
- School type: Public high school
- School district: Two Rivers School District
- CEEB code: 041901
- NCES School ID: 050007901521
- Faculty: 62.84 (on FTE basis)
- Grades: 7–12
- Enrollment: 435 (2023–2024)
- Student to teacher ratio: 6.92
- Education system: ADE Smart Core curriculum
- Classes offered: Regular, Advanced Placement (AP)
- Colors: Orange and blue
- Athletics conference: 3A 5 (Football); 3A 4 (Basketball)
- Mascot: Alligator
- Nickname: Gators
- Team name: Two Rivers Gators
- Newspaper: The Gator Gazette
- Communities served: Ola, Plainview, Rover, Casa, and Briggsville
- Affiliation: Arkansas Activities Association
- Website: www.trgators.org

Two Rivers High School (TRHS) is a public high school for students in grades 7 through 12 located in unincorporated Yell County, Arkansas, United States, on a section of Arkansas Highway 28 midway between Ola and Plainview. Two Rivers High School is administered by the Two Rivers School District.

The Two Rivers High School and school district serves 650 square miles (1,700 km^{2}) of rural communities. Two Rivers High School is one of four high schools within Yell County and the sole high school administered by the Two Rivers School District.

== Attendance boundary ==
Within Yell County the school district's area, and therefore the high school's attendance boundary, includes the municipalities of Ola and Plainview and the census-designated places of Centerville and Rover. The district also includes the unincorporated areas of Bluffton, Briggsville, Fourche Valley, Gravelly, and Wing in Yell County. Within Perry County the attendance boundary includes Casa.

== History ==
In 2010, construction of the 111 acres (45 ha) campus was completed on the 132,800 square feet (12,340 m^{2}) facility for Two Rivers High School, which includes a multipurpose building for large gatherings and sports such as basketball and volleyball; a 450-seat auditorium for special events and performing arts; two science labs; a library with 20 computer stations; classrooms; a cafeteria; a distance learning lab; two computer labs; a conference room; administrative offices; an agriculture facility; and the Two Rivers High School Band room doubling as a "safe room" for 850 to 900 people for use in case of severe weather.

The school was formed as a result of the consolidation of Ola High School and Plainview-Rover High School. The school district and high school's name was chosen because of proximity to the Petit Jean River and Fourche La Fave River.

A facility for community fitness, the brainchild of Lindy Minnie, opened at Two Rivers High with a $10,000 grant for athletic equipment and the assistance of the mayor of Ola and the mayor of Plainview. Minnie, a physical education teacher at Two Rivers Elementary, wanted to unite the communities in the school district, which had been forced to consolidate into one through a state law, as well as promote fitness in the community.

== Curriculum ==
The assumed course of study for students follows the Smart Core curriculum developed by the Arkansas Department of Education (ADE), which requires students to obtain 22 units before graduation. Students complete regular and Advanced Placement (AP) coursework and exams. Two Rivers is identified as a Title I school by the U.S. Department of Education that provides funding for schools and school districts with a high percentage of students from low-income families.

Two Rivers is accredited by the ADE. The ADE Standards of Accreditation of Public Schools require that each school offer three programs of study in three different occupational areas; Two Rivers High School offered 10 programs of study in 10 different career cluster pathways for 2011–12. Additionally, the school maintains participation in the EAST Initiative that offers students opportunities to collaborate with nearby business and technology companies and organizations.

== Extracurricular activities ==
The Two Rivers High School mascot is the Gators with the school colors of orange and blue. The Two Rivers Gators compete in the 3A classification administered by the Arkansas Activities Association (AAA) within the 3A 5 Conference for football and the 3A 4 Conference for basketball.
