= Rock Building =

- U.S. National Register of Historic Places
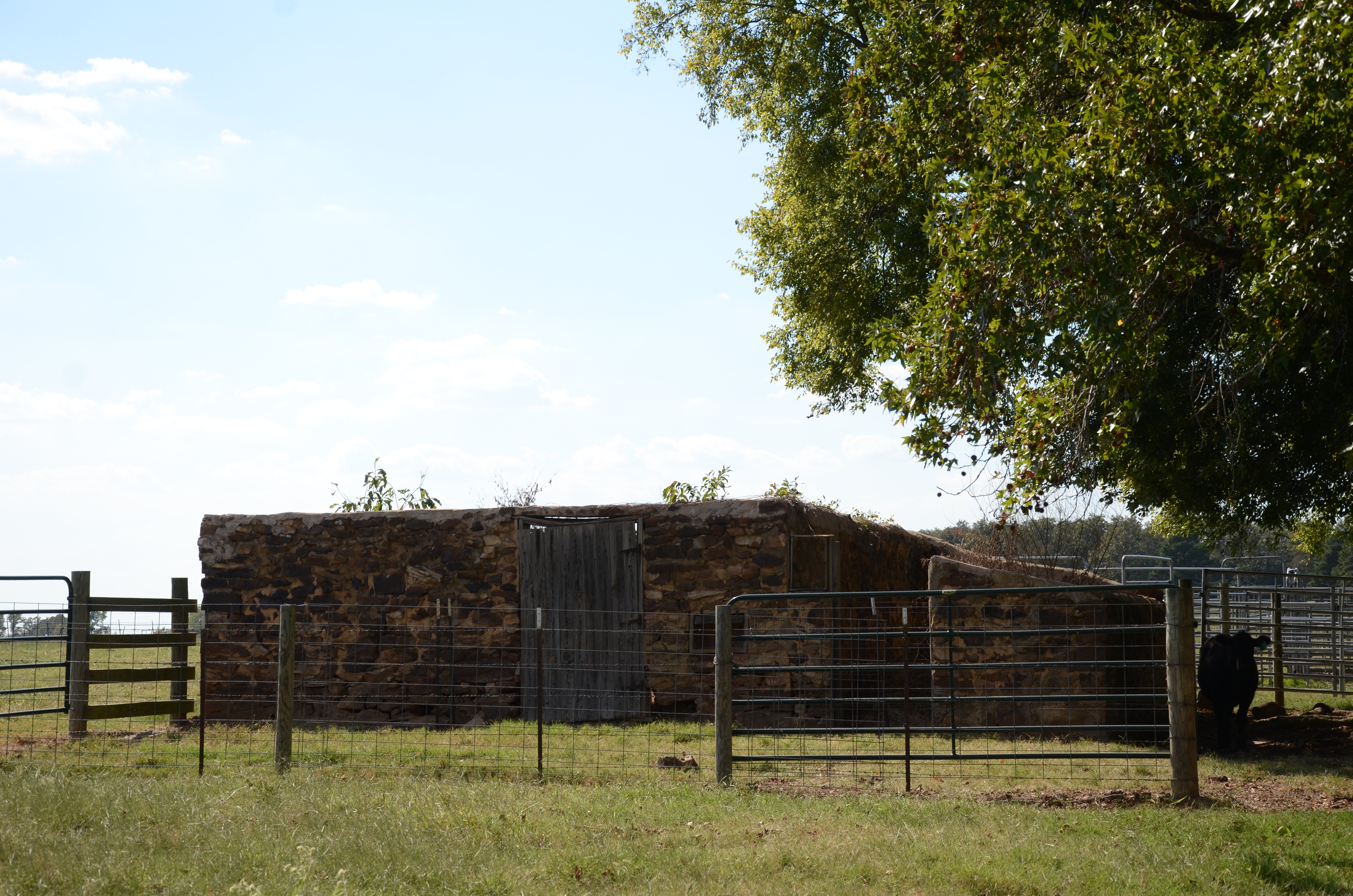

- Location within Arkansas Location within the United States
- Nearest city: Plainview, Arkansas
- Coordinates: 35°18′0″N 91°40′9″W
- Area: less than one acre
- Built: 1915
- MPS: White County MPS
- NRHP reference No.: 91001195
- Added to NRHP: July 23, 1992

The Rock Building is a historic building in rural White County, Arkansas. It is located on the west side of Bartell Road, north of Judsonia and west of Arkansas Highway 13. It is a single-story stone structure, now lacking a roof, of uncertain original function. It was built about 1915, and originally had a gabled roof that extended over a porch. The building is unusual by virtue of its stone construction, which is rare for the period in the county.

The building was listed on the National Register of Historic Places in 1992.

== See also ==
- National Register of Historic Places listings in White County, Arkansas
