= Plainview-Rover High School =

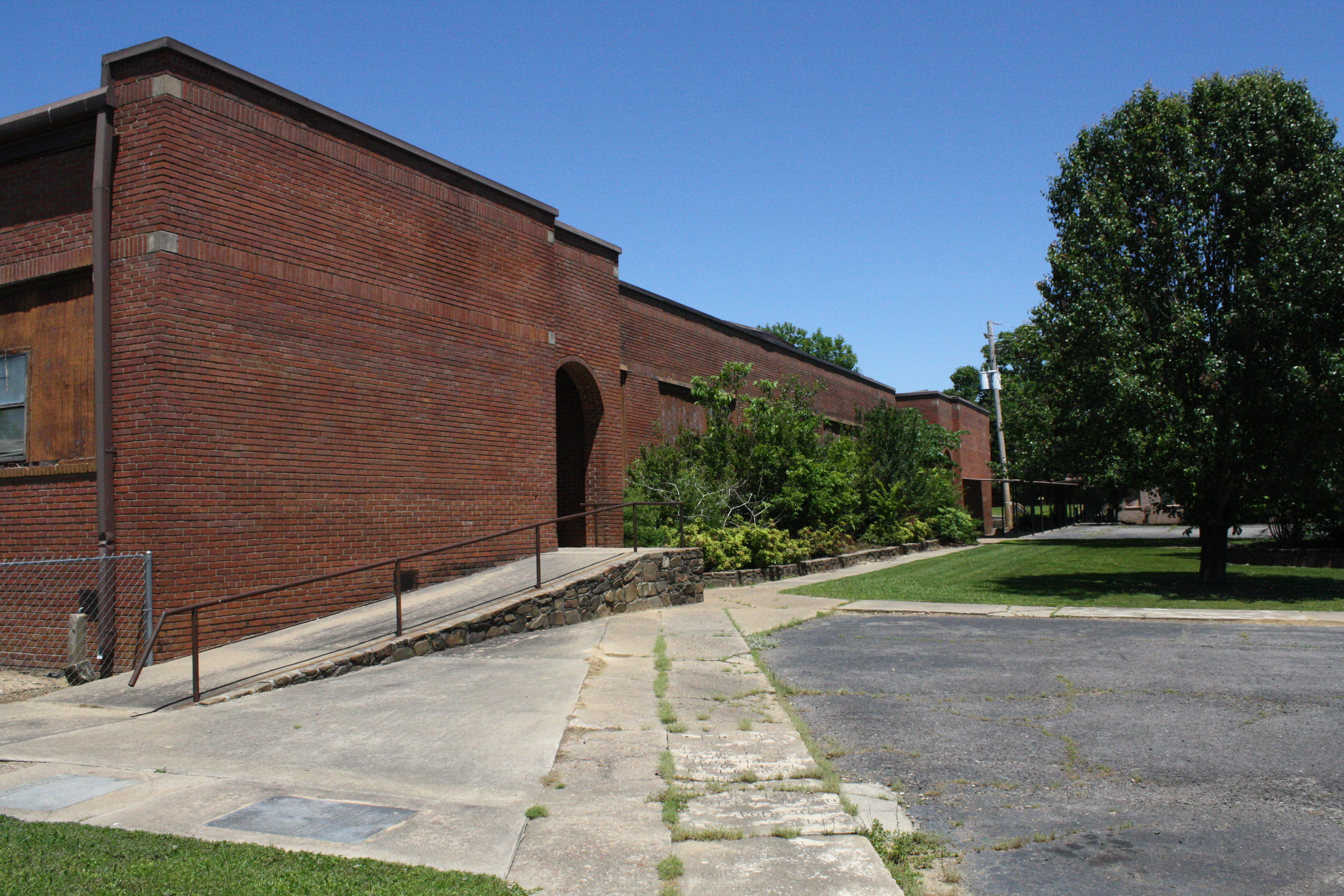

Location
- 190 Main Street; Plainview, Arkansas 38773; United States
- 34.9895589°N 93.2972734°W

Information
- Type: Public high school
- School district: Two Rivers School District (2004-2010); Plainview-Rover School District (-2004)
- Website: https://web.archive.org/*/http://plainview.k12.ar.us

Plainview-Rover High School was a high school in Plainview, Arkansas, serving grades 7–12. In its final years it was a part of the Two Rivers School District. It served the communities of Plainview and Rover.

== History ==
It was previously a part of the Plainview-Rover School District. On July 1, 2004, that district consolidated into the Two Rivers district.

The K-12 Fourche Valley School closed in 2009, and its high school students were moved to Plainview-Rover High. Plainview-Rover High was closed in 2010 when it consolidated with Ola High School to form Two Rivers High School.
