= Emmett Miller House =

Historic house in Arkansas, United States

- U.S. National Register of Historic Places
- Location within Arkansas Location within the United States
- Nearest city: Plainview, Arkansas
- Coordinates: 35°18′38″N 91°39′38″W
- Area: less than one acre
- Built: 1938
- Architectural style: Bungalow/craftsman
- MPS: White County MPS
- NRHP reference No.: 91001237
- Added to NRHP: July 20, 1992

The Emmett Miller House was a historic house in rural White County, Arkansas. It was located on the west side of Arkansas Highway 13, north of Judsonia and east of Plainview. It was a single-story wood-frame structure, with a gabled roof that had exposed rafters and Craftsman brackets in the end gables. Its front porch, also gabled, had similar features. It was built in 1938, and was the best example of Craftsman architecture in the Plainview area.

The house was listed on the National Register of Historic Places in 1992. It has been listed as demolished in the Arkansas Historic Preservation Program database.

== See also ==
- National Register of Historic Places listings in White County, Arkansas
