= Casa, Arkansas =

- Town
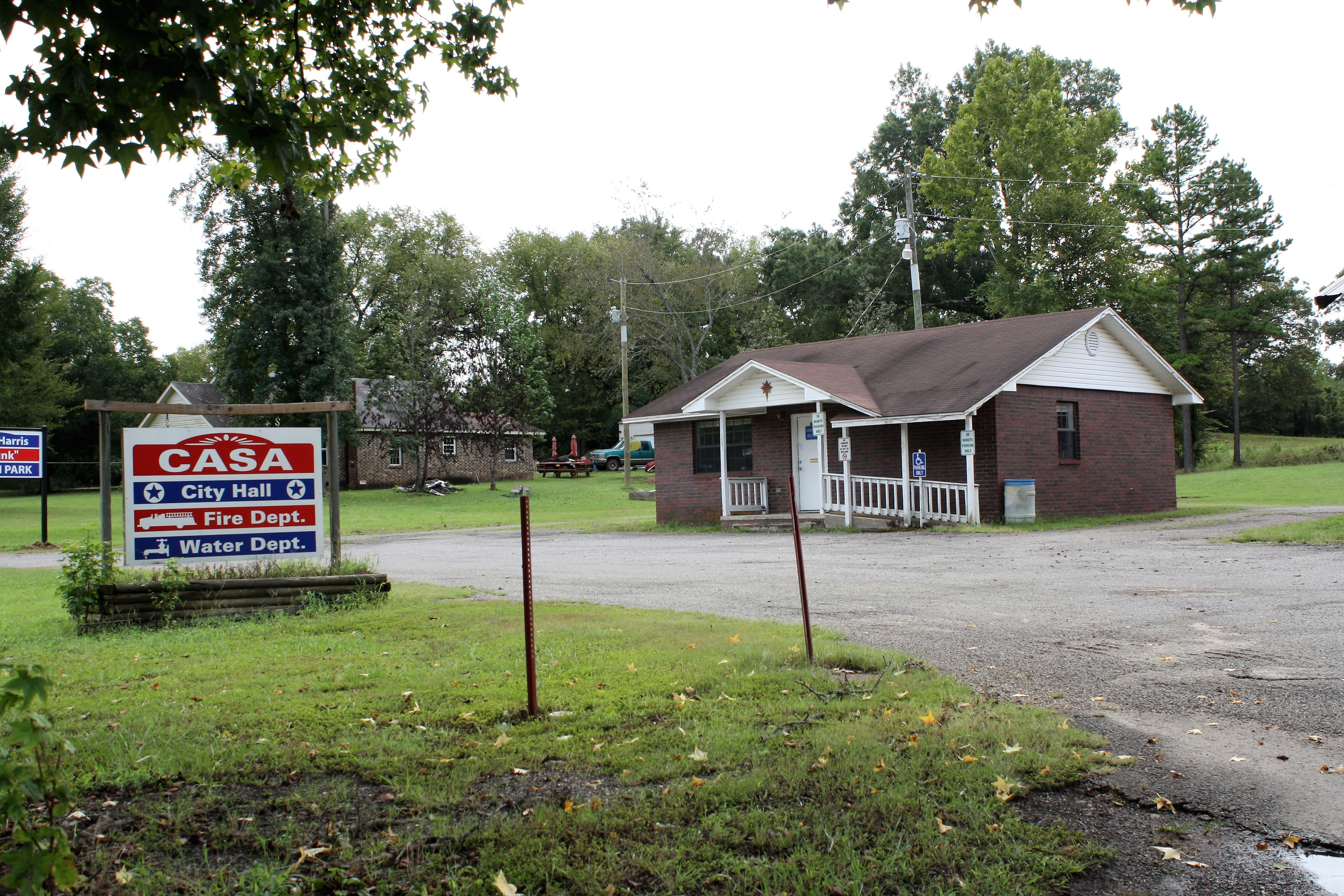
- City hall in Casa

- Location of Casa in Perry County, Arkansas.
- Coordinates: 35°1′25″N 93°2′50″W
- Country: United States
- State: Arkansas
- County: Perry

Area
  - Total: 1.09 sq mi (2.83 km^{2})
  - Land: 1.09 sq mi (2.83 km^{2})
  - Water: 0 sq mi (0.00 km^{2})
- Elevation: 371 ft (113 m)

Population (2020)
  - Total: 120
  - Estimate (2025): 130 ▲
  - Density: 109.9/sq mi (42.45/km^{2})
- Time zone: UTC-6 (Central (CST))
  - Summer (DST): UTC-5 (CDT)
- ZIP code: 72025
- Area code: 501
- FIPS code: 05-11890
- GNIS feature ID: 2406232
- Website: cityofcasa.gov

Casa is a town in Perry County, Arkansas, United States. Located in Central Arkansas, the town initially grew due to the mining of coal, harvesting of timber and cultivation of cotton. The Great Depression reduced the population greatly, and the community's economy never recovered. The population was 120 at the 2020 census.

Casa is about midway between Ola and Perry. The town is the westernmost municipality within the Little Rock–North Little Rock–Conway Metropolitan Statistical Area.

== Geography ==
Casa is located at 35°1′25″N 93°2′50″W (35.023700, -93.047236).

According to the United States Census Bureau, the town has a total area of 2.8 km^{2} (1.1 sq mi), all land.

== Demographics ==
Historical population
Census	Pop.	Note	%±
1910	310		—
1920	300		−3.2%
1930	269		−10.3%
1940	245		−8.9%
1950	184		−24.9%
1960	184		0.0%
1970	208		13.0%
1980	179		−13.9%
1990	200		11.7%
2000	209		4.5%
2010	171		−18.2%
2020	120		−29.8%
2025 (est.)	130	▲	8.3%
U.S. Decennial Census; 2014 Estimate

According to the census of 2000, there were 209 people, 79 households, and 59 families residing in the town. The population density was 74.0 people /km^{2} (192 people/mi^{2}). There were 93 housing units at an average density of 32.9 units /km^{2} (85 units/mi^{2}). The racial makeup of the town was 100.00% White.

There were 79 households, out of which 34.2% had children under the age of 18 living with them, 58.2% were married couples living together, 10.1% had a female householder with no husband present, and 25.3% were non-families. 25.3% of all households were made up of individuals, and 13.9% had someone living alone who was 65 years of age or older. The average household size was 2.65 and the average family size was 3.08.

In the town, the population was spread out, with 26.8% under the age of 18, 8.1% from 18 to 24, 28.2% from 25 to 44, 21.5% from 45 to 64, and 15.3% who were 65 years of age or older. The median age was 38 years. For every 100 females, there were 106.9 males. For every 100 females age 18 and over, there were 96.2 males.

The average income for a household in the town was $27,813, and the median income for a family was $32,250. Males had a median income of $18,750 versus $19,375 for females. The per capita income for the town was $20,312. About 19.0% of families and 22.2% of the population were below the poverty line, including 38.6% of those under the age of eighteen and 7.1% of those 65 or over.

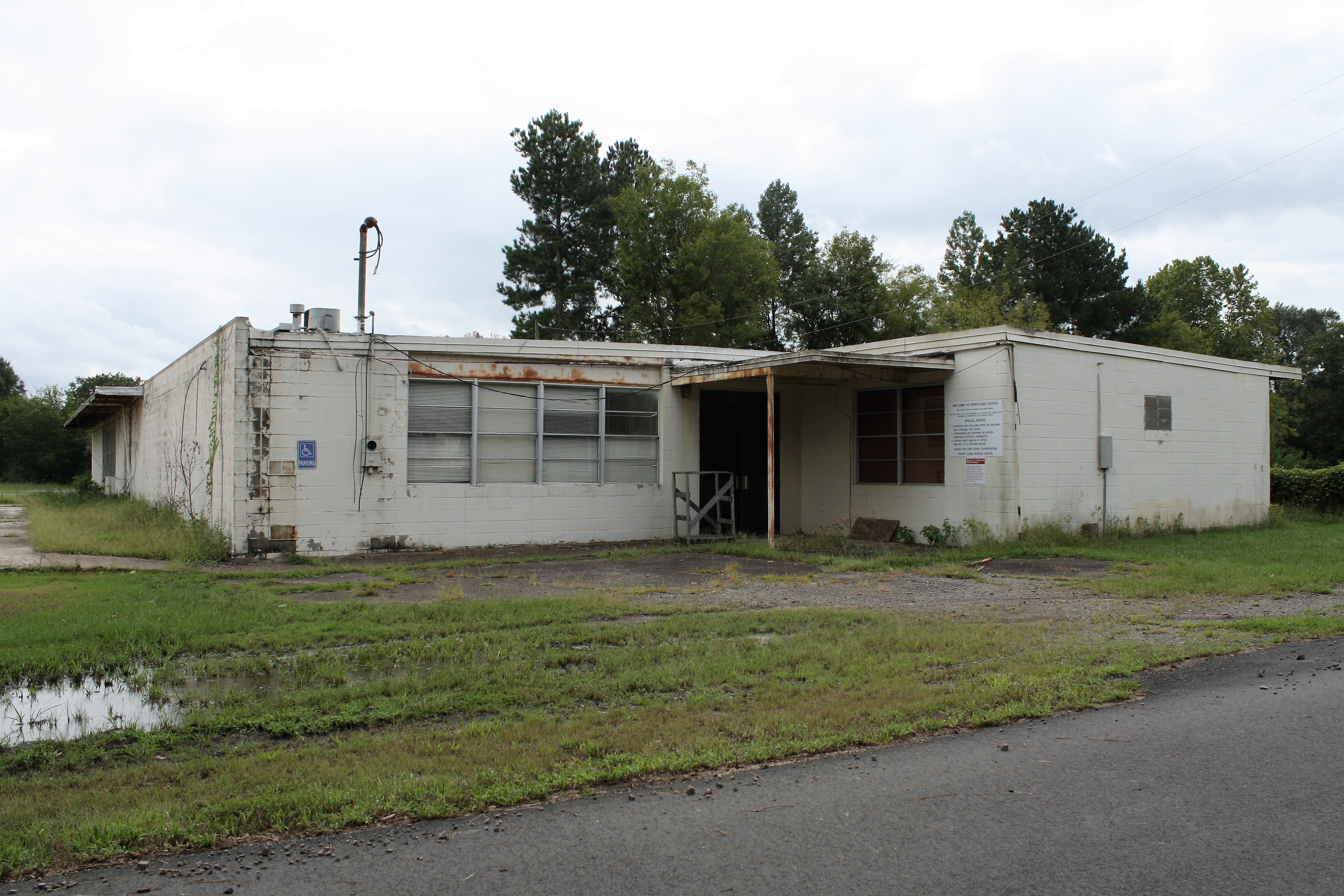
Perry-Casa High School

== Education ==
Free access to public education is provided by the Two Rivers School District including Two Rivers Elementary School and Two Rivers High School. It was previously in the Perry-Casa School District until July 1, 2004, when it merged into the Two Rivers School District.
