= Centerville, Yell County, Arkansas =

Centerville, Arkansas
- Census-designated place
- Location within Arkansas Location within the United States
- Coordinates: 35°07′16″N 93°10′05″W
- Country: United States
- State: Arkansas
- County: Yell
- Elevation: 354 ft (108 m)

Population (2020)
  - Total: 283
- Time zone: UTC-6 (Central (CST))
  - Summer (DST): UTC-5 (CDT)
- ZIP code: 72829
- Area code: 479
- GNIS feature ID: 2805632

Centerville is an unincorporated community and census-designated place (CDP) in Yell County, Arkansas, United States. Centerville is located at the junction of Arkansas Highways 7 and 154, 6.5 miles (10.5 km) north-northeast of Ola. It was first listed as a CDP in the 2020 census with a population of 283.

Centerville has a post office with ZIP code 72829.

== Demographics ==
Historical population
Census	Pop.	Note	%±
2020	283		—
U.S. Decennial Census; 2020

=== 2020 census ===
Centerville CDP, Arkansas – Racial and ethnic composition Note: the US Census treats Hispanic/Latino as an ethnic category. This table excludes Latinos from the racial categories and assigns them to a separate category. Hispanics/Latinos may be of any race.
Race / Ethnicity (NH = Non-Hispanic)	Pop 2020	% 2020
White alone (NH)	223	78.80%
Black or African American alone (NH)	2	0.71%
Native American or Alaska Native alone (NH)	7	2.47%
Asian alone (NH)	0	0.00%
Pacific Islander alone (NH)	0	0.00%
Some Other Race alone (NH)	0	0.00%
Mixed Race or Multi-Racial (NH)	8	2.83%
Hispanic or Latino (any race)	43	15.19%
Total	283	100.00%

== Education ==
Centerville is in the Two Rivers School District, which operates Two Rivers High School.
