= Rover, Arkansas =

- Census-designated place
- Location within Arkansas Location within the United States
- Coordinates: 34°57′07″N 93°24′32″W
- Country: United States
- State: Arkansas
- County: Yell
- Elevation: 400 ft (120 m)

Population (2020)
  - Total: 159
- Time zone: UTC-6 (Central (CST))
  - Summer (DST): UTC-5 (CDT)
- ZIP code: 72860
- Area code: 479
- GNIS feature ID: 2805682

Rover is an unincorporated community and census-designated place (CDP) in Yell County, Arkansas, United States. Rover is located on Arkansas Highway 28, 6.5 miles (10.5 km) west-southwest of Plainview. Rover has a post office with ZIP code 72860. It was first listed as a CDP in the 2020 census with a population of 159.

== Education ==
Public education is administered by the Two Rivers School District, which supports:

- Two Rivers High School—Serves students in grades 7–12.
- Two Rivers Elementary School—Serves students in Kindergarten through 6th grade.

It was previously in the Plainview-Rover School District until July 1, 2004, when it merged into the Two Rivers School District. The merged district formerly operated Plainview-Rover Elementary School (later Plainview Elementary School) and Plainview-Rover High School. In 2010 Plainview-Rover High closed as Two Rivers High opened. In 2012 Plainview Elementary closed as Two Rivers Elementary opened.

== Demographics ==
Historical population
Census	Pop.	Note	%±
2020	159		—
U.S. Decennial Census; 2020

=== 2020 census ===
Rover CDP, Arkansas – Demographic Profile (NH = Non-Hispanic) Note: the US Census treats Hispanic/Latino as an ethnic category. This table excludes Latinos from the racial categories and assigns them to a separate category. Hispanics/Latinos may be of any race.
Race / Ethnicity	Pop 2020	% 2020
White alone (NH)	145	91.19%
Black or African American alone (NH)	0	0.00%
Native American or Alaska Native alone (NH)	0	0.00%
Asian alone (NH)	1	0.63%
Pacific Islander alone (NH)	0	0.00%
Some Other Race alone (NH)	0	0.00%
Mixed Race/Multi-Racial (NH)	7	4.40%
Hispanic or Latino (any race)	6	3.77%
Total	159	100.00%
