= Gravelly, Arkansas =

- Unincorporated community
- Location within Arkansas Location within the United States
- Coordinates: 34°52′59″N 93°41′15″W
- Country: United States
- State: Arkansas
- County: Yell
- Elevation: 463 ft (141 m)
- Time zone: UTC-6 (Central (CST))
  - Summer (DST): UTC-5 (CDT)
- ZIP code: 72838
- Area code: 479
- GNIS feature ID: 77059

Gravelly is an unincorporated community in Yell County, Arkansas, United States, located on Arkansas Highway 28, 23 miles (37 km) west-southwest of Plainview. Gravelly has a post office with ZIP code 72838.

== Education ==
It is within the Two Rivers School District. The district operates Two Rivers High School.

== Notable person ==
Actor Arthur Hunnicutt was a native of Gravelly.
