= Pleasant Hill, Yell County, Arkansas =

Pleasant Hill, Arkansas
- Unincorporated community
- Location within Arkansas Location within the United States
- Coordinates: 34°53′21″N 93°32′17″W
- Country: United States
- State: Arkansas
- County: Yell
- Elevation: 440 ft (130 m)
- Time zone: UTC-6 (Central (CST))
  - Summer (DST): UTC-5 (CDT)
- Area code: 479
- GNIS feature ID: 73124

Pleasant Hill is an unincorporated community in Yell County, Arkansas, United States, located on Arkansas Highway 307, 14 miles (23 km) southwest of Danville.
