= Alpha, Arkansas =

- Unincorporated community
- Location within Arkansas Location within the United States
- Coordinates: 35°06′56″N 93°16′51″W
- Country: United States
- State: Arkansas
- County: Yell
- Elevation: 381 ft (116 m)
- Time zone: UTC-6 (Central (CST))
  - Summer (DST): UTC-5 (CDT)
- Area code: 479
- GNIS feature ID: 70435

Alpha is an unincorporated community in Yell County, Arkansas, United States, located on Arkansas Highway 154, 7.7 miles (12.4 km) east-northeast of Danville.
