= Plainview-Rover School District =

Former school district in Arkansas

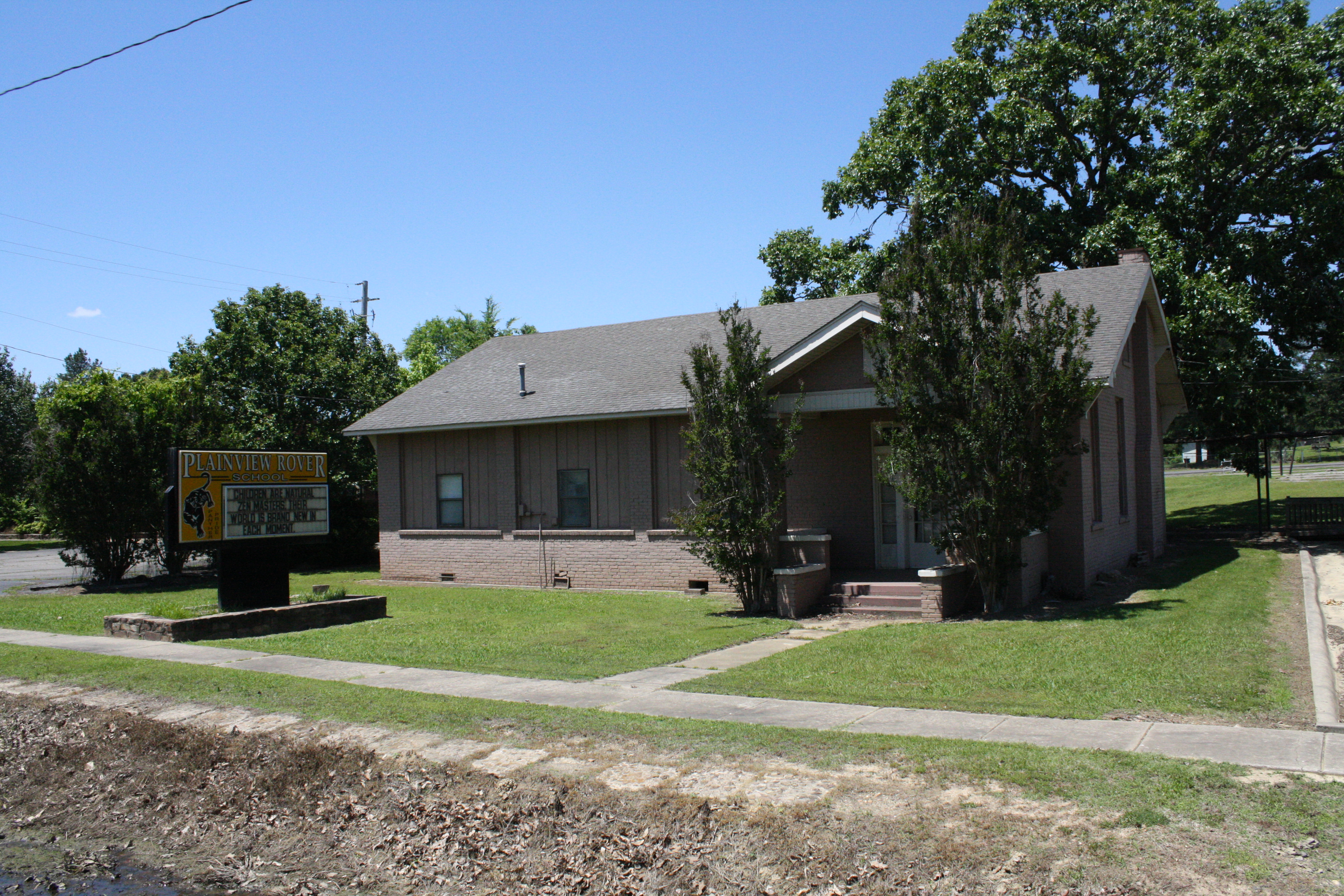
Former Plainview-Rover School District administration building at 510 W Main St

Plainview-Rover School District was a school district headquartered in Plainview, Arkansas, serving Plainview and Rover. Jimmy Cunningham was the last superintendent. The panthers were the mascot.

By 2004 new laws were passed requiring school districts with enrollments below 350 to consolidate with other school districts. Plainview-Rover asked the Arkansas Board of Education if it could consolidate with the Ola School District, which was merging into another district. On July 1, 2004, Plainview-Rover merged with multiple districts into the Two Rivers School District.
