= Bluffton, Arkansas =

- Unincorporated community
- Location within Arkansas Location within the United States
- Coordinates: 34°54′19″N 93°36′03″W
- Country: United States
- State: Arkansas
- County: Yell
- Elevation: 440 ft (130 m)
- Time zone: UTC-6 (Central (CST))
  - Summer (DST): UTC-5 (CDT)
- ZIP code: 72827
- Area code: 479
- GNIS feature ID: 70742

Bluffton is an unincorporated community in Yell County, Arkansas, United States, located on Arkansas Highway 28, 18 miles (29 km) west-southwest of Plainview. Bluffton has a post office with ZIP code 72827.

== Education ==
It is within the Two Rivers School District. The district operates Two Rivers High School.
