= Petit Jean River Bridge (Logan County, Arkansas) =

- U.S. National Register of Historic Places
- Location within Arkansas Location within the United States
- Nearest city: Sugar Grove, Arkansas
- Coordinates: 35°5′48″N 93°48′3″W
- Area: less than one acre
- Built: 1938
- Architectural style: Pratt through truss
- MPS: Historic Bridges of Arkansas MPS
- NRHP reference No.: 95000646
- Added to NRHP: May 26, 1995

The Petit Jean River Bridge is a historic bridge in rural southern Logan County, Arkansas. The bridge carries Old Highway 109 across the Petit Jean River between Sugar Grove and Magazine. It consists of a single-span steel Pratt through truss and two masonry approach spans, set on concrete piers in the river. The total structure length is 273 feet (83 m), with a roadway width of 19 feet (5.8 m) and a total width of 24 feet (7.3 m). The bridge was built in 1938.

The bridge was listed on the National Register of Historic Places in 1995.

== See also ==
- Petit Jean River Bridge (Yell County, Arkansas)
- List of bridges documented by the Historic American Engineering Record in Arkansas
- List of bridges on the National Register of Historic Places in Arkansas
- National Register of Historic Places listings in Logan County, Arkansas
