= Ard, Arkansas =

- Unincorporated community
- Location within Arkansas Location within the United States
- Coordinates: 35°08′41″N 93°11′31″W
- Country: United States
- State: Arkansas
- County: Yell
- Elevation: 459 ft (140 m)
- Time zone: UTC-6 (Central (CST))
  - Summer (DST): UTC-5 (CDT)
- Area code: 479
- GNIS feature ID: 67853

Ard is an unincorporated community in Yell County, Arkansas, United States. The community is located along locally maintained Ard Road 5.7 miles (9.2 km) south-southwest of Dardanelle.
