= Ola High School (Arkansas) =

Location
- 307 West Hill Street; Ola, Arkansas 72853; United States
- Coordinates: 35°2′8″N 93°13′29″W

Information
- School type: Public high school
- Status: Closed
- Closed: June 2010
- School district: Two Rivers School District (2004-2010); Ola School District (-2004)
- Education system: ADE Smart Core curriculum
- Mascot: Mustang horse
- Team name: Ola Mustangs
- USNWR ranking: Bronze Medalist (2012)

Ola High School was a public high school located in Ola, Arkansas, serving grades 7–12. Student teacher ratio was 9.5 to 1. Ola High School was administered by the Ola School District until July 1, 2004, and then the Two Rivers School District. The school was closed in 2010 with the establishment of Two Rivers High School.

== Academics ==
The assumed course of study for students followed the Smart Core curriculum developed by the Arkansas Department of Education (ADE), which requires scholars to obtain 22 units before graduation. Students completed regular and Advanced Placement (AP) coursework and exams.

Based on the 2009–10 school year, which was the school's last, Ola High School was nationally recognized with the Bronze Award in the Best High Schools 2012 report developed by U.S. News & World Report.

== Extracurricular activities ==
The Ola High School mascot and athletic emblem was the Mustangs.
