= Aly, Arkansas =

- Unincorporated community
- Location within Arkansas Location within the United States
- Coordinates: 34°47′26″N 93°29′11″W
- Country: United States
- State: Arkansas
- County: Yell
- Elevation: 840 ft (260 m)
- Time zone: UTC-6 (Central (CST))
  - Summer (DST): UTC-5 (CDT)
- Area code: 479
- GNIS feature ID: 74575

Aly is an unincorporated community in Yell County, Arkansas, United States, located on Arkansas Highway 27, 19 miles (31 km) south-southwest of Danville.
