= Petit Jean River =

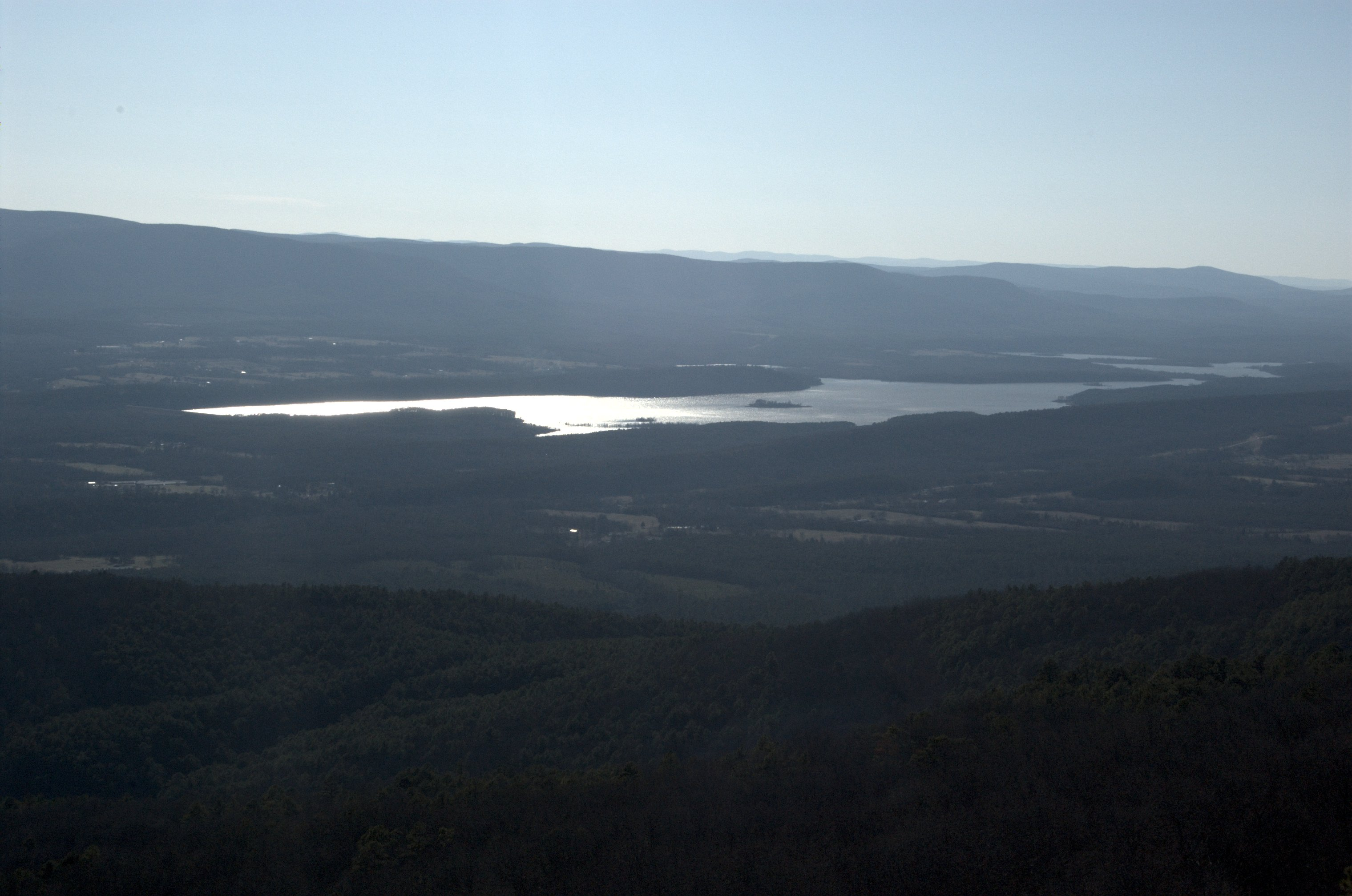

Location
- Country: United States
- State: Arkansas
- Counties: Scott, Logan, Conway, Yell

Physical characteristics
- Source
  - location: northern Ouachita Mountains near Waldron, Arkansas
  - coordinates: 35°00′37″N 94°00′55″W
  - elevation: 671 ft (205 m)
- Mouth: Arkansas River
  - location: North of Petit Jean State Park
  - coordinates: 35°10′10″N 92°54′27″W
  - elevation: 285 ft (87 m)
- Length: 113 mi (182 km)
- Discharge
  - location: Danville, Arkansas
  - average: 843 cu/ft. per sec.

The Petit Jean River is a 113-mile (182 km) river in west-central Arkansas. The river rises in the Ouachita Mountains in northern Scott County; it flows through Logan County and Yell County, defining the border between Yell County and Conway County before reaching its mouth at the Arkansas River north of Petit Jean State Park. The city of Danville, named after a steamboat that navigated the river in 1840, is the largest settlement on the river. Blue Mountain Lake, which straddles the border between Logan and Yell Counties, was created when the river was dammed in 1947. The river is the longest located entirely within the Arkansas River Valley.

According to local legend, the river and the nearby Petit Jean Mountain were both named after a French woman who posed as a man to follow a lover to America. Due to her size, she was nicknamed "Petit Jean" by her ship's crew. She fell ill and died after reaching Arkansas and was reportedly buried on the side of the mountain. An alternate explanation states that the river was named for the French phrase "petit jaune", or "little yellow", due to its appearance.

The discharge of the Petit Jean has been measured by the USGS since 1916. The stream gauge near Danville measures flow from an area of 764 square miles (1,980 km^{2}). The mean flow between 1947 and 2013 was 824 cubic feet per second (23.3 m^{3}/s), with the lowest daily flow recorded as zero in August 1956.

The highest river level recorded occurred in April 1939 with a height of 31.8 feet (9.7 m) through the gauge, giving a corresponding flow of 70,800 cubic feet per second (2,000 m^{3}/s).

One bridge across the river, one in Logan County, are listed on the National Register of Historic Places. one in Yell County has since collapsed after a truck driver drove over with a load that exceeded the weight limit by 32 tons in 2019.
