= Yell County, Arkansas =

County in Arkansas, United States

- County
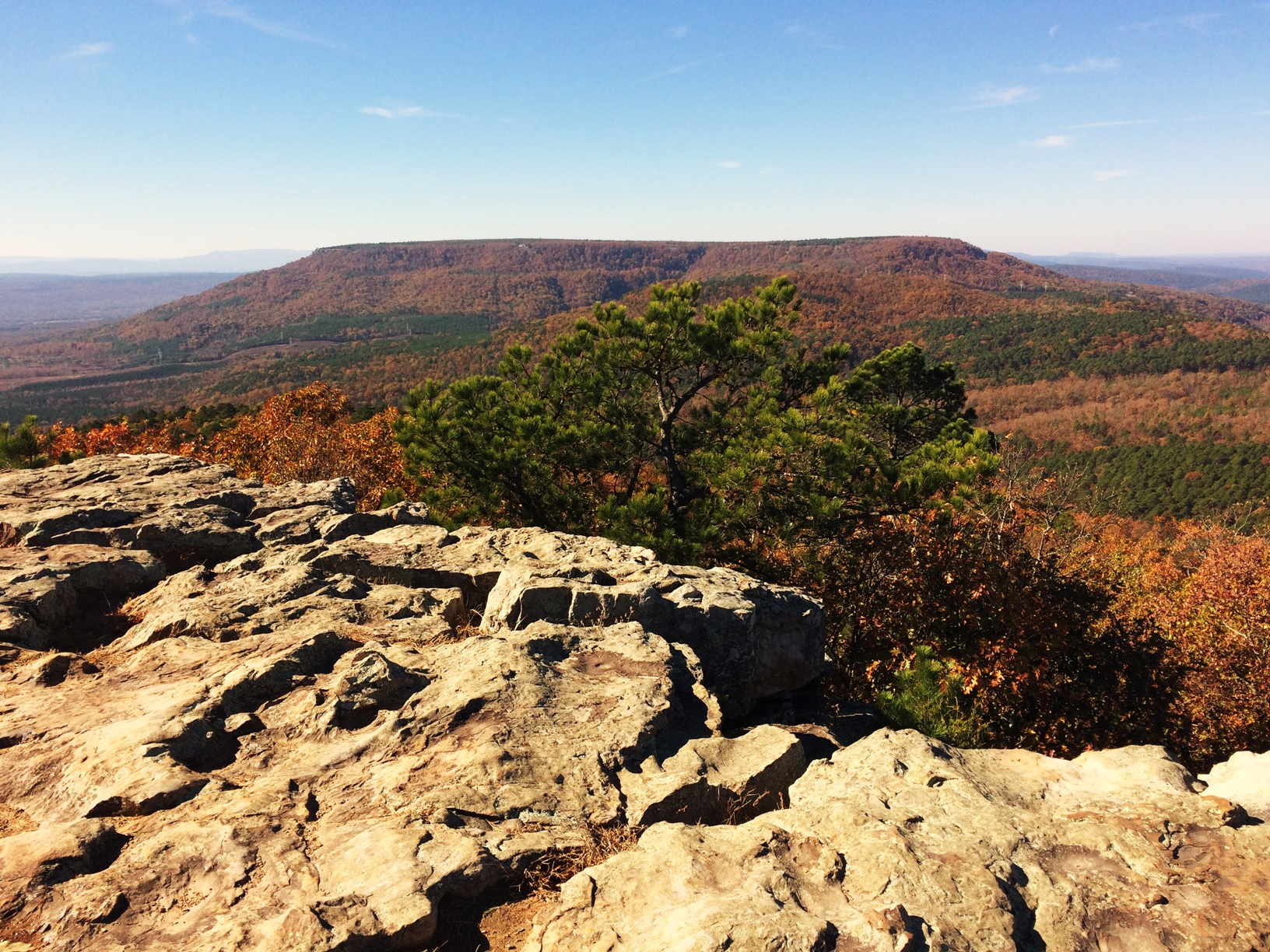
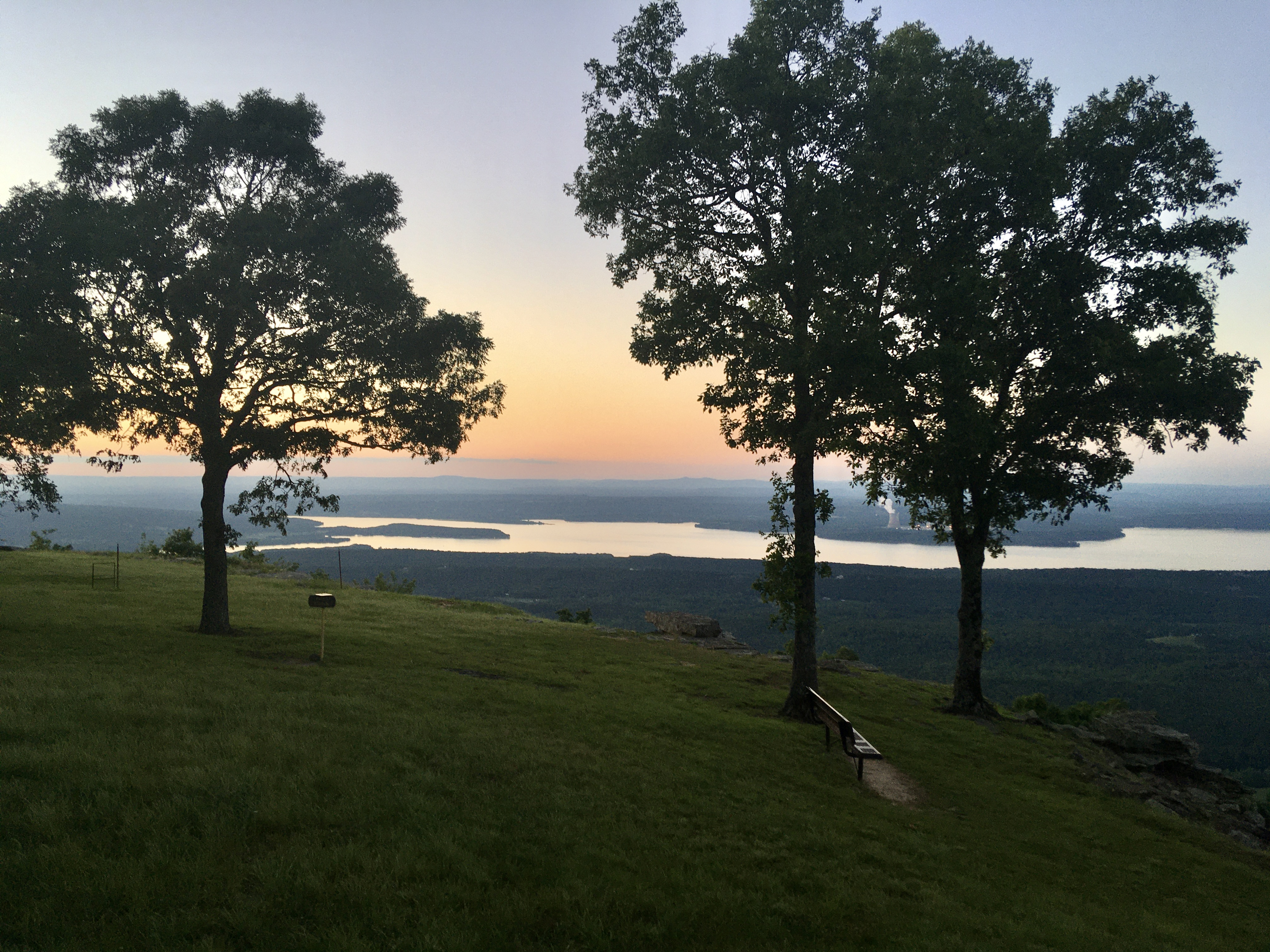
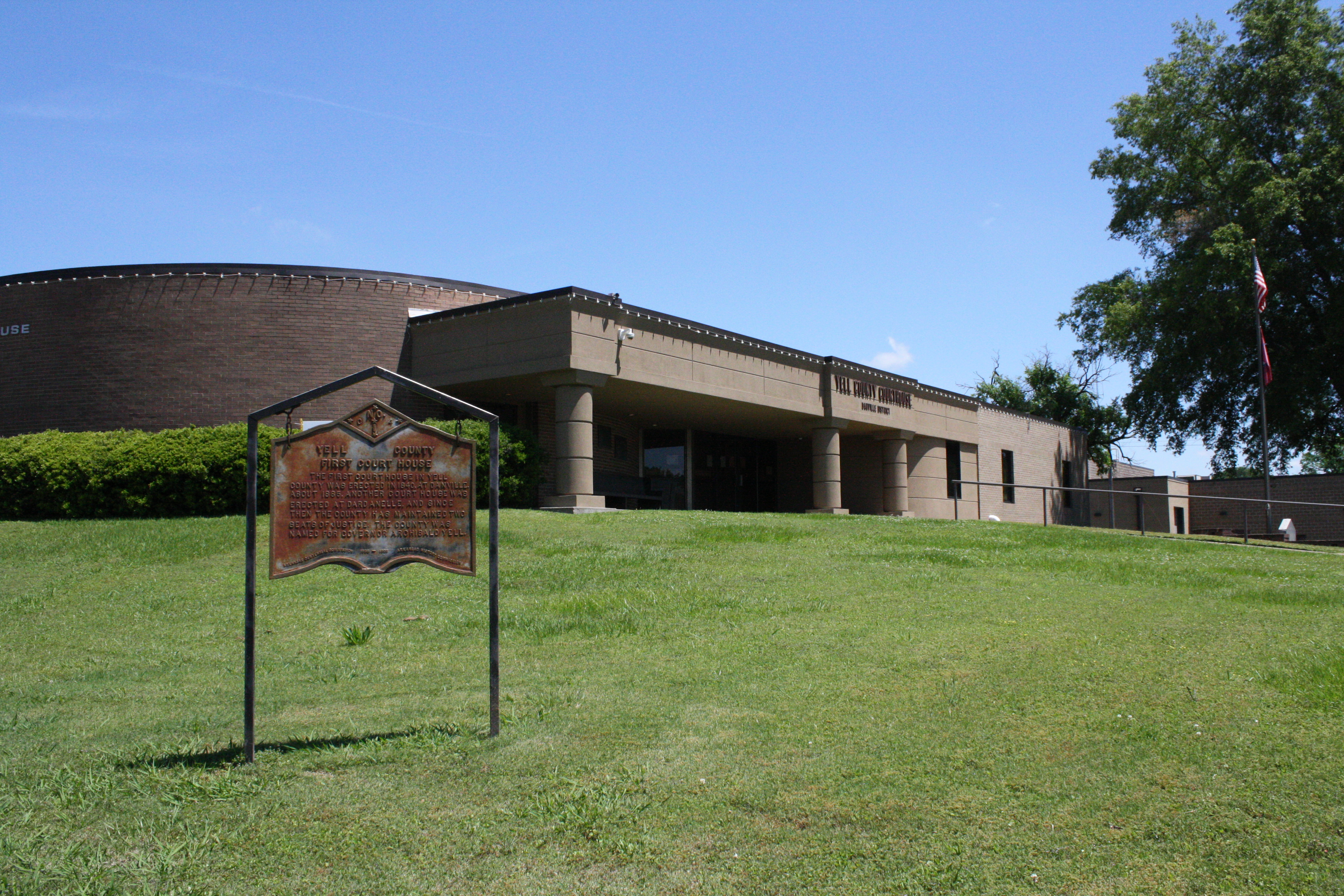
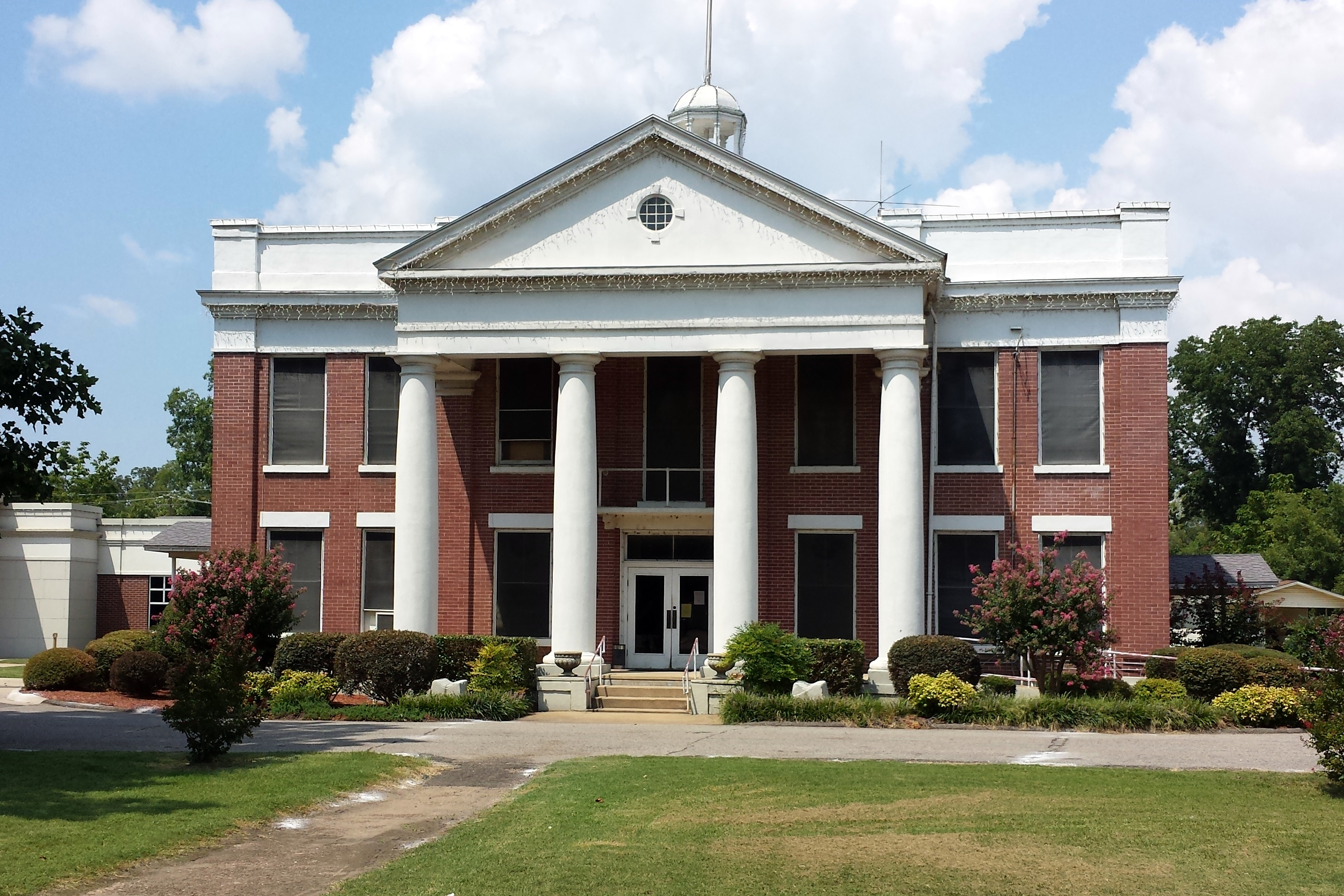
- Mount Nebo Lake Dardanelle as seen from Mount Nebo Yell County Courthouse, Danville District Yell County Courthouse, Dardanelle District

- Location within the U.S. state of Arkansas
- Coordinates: 34°59′54″N 93°27′09″W
- Country: United States
- State: Arkansas
- Founded: December 5, 1840
- Named for: Archibald Yell
- Seat: Danville (western district); Dardanelle (eastern district)
- Largest city: Dardanelle

Government
  - County judge: Jeff Gilkey

Area
  - Total: 949 sq mi (2,460 km^{2})
  - Land: 930 sq mi (2,400 km^{2})
  - Water: 19 sq mi (49 km^{2}) 2.0%

Population (2020)
  - Total: 20,263
  - Estimate (2025): 19,956 ▼
  - Density: 22/sq mi (8.4/km^{2})
- Time zone: UTC−6 (Central)
  - Summer (DST): UTC−5 (CDT)
- Congressional district: 4th
- Website: yellcountyar.gov

Yell County is a county in the U.S. state of Arkansas. As of the 2020 census, its population was 20,263. The county has two county seats, Dardanelle and Danville. Yell County is Arkansas's 42nd county, formed on December 5, 1840, from portions of Scott and Pope Counties. It was named after Archibald Yell, who was the state's first member of the United States House of Representatives and the second governor of Arkansas. He died in combat at the Battle of Buena Vista during the Mexican–American War. Yell County is part of the Russellville micropolitan statistical area. Yell County is a dry county, as alcohol is prohibited.

== History ==
Native Americans first inhabited present-day Yell County and the Arkansas River Valley for thousands of years prior to European colonization. They used the open, fertile floodplain of the Arkansas River for hunting grounds and later farming settlements. During the Thomas Jefferson and Indian Removal era, many Cherokee were voluntarily relocating from Georgia along the Arkansas River, including in Yell County, between 1775 and 1786. A large Cherokee reservation across the Arkansas River from Yell County was established in 1815 to encourage further voluntary relocation from Georgia.

The area presently encompassed as Yell County was first settled by European settlers when James Carden built a house in 1819 among Cherokee farms in the Dardanelle Bottoms, at the confluence of the Arkansas and Petit Jeans. Lands south of the Arkansas River had been deeded to the Choctaw in the 1820s when they removed from their homelands east of the Mississippi River, but White settlement and Cherokee relocation continued apace into the 1820s. The peoples competed over the prime riverbottom lands.

In June 1823, a meeting between numerous Cherokee chiefs and acting Territorial Governor Robert Crittenden was held under two large oak trees. Long believed by many to result in a "Council Oaks Treaty" re-establishing Cherokee title of 3.2 million acres (1.3 million hectares) north of the Arkansas River, Crittenden had no treaty-making authority, and the meeting ended with no agreement other than each party sending separate letters to Secretary of War John C. Calhoun.

Some Cherokee remained on their farms south of the river, the group identifying itself as Black Dutch, intermarrying and assimilating with the area's White settlers.

In 1830, the United States Congress enacted the Indian Removal Act, leading to further, forcible Cherokee settlement from the Southeast into the Arkansas River Valley. Cherokee, Muskogee (Creek), and Seminole were forcibly removed along the Trail of Tears through Yell County to Indian Territory (present-day Oklahoma).

Yell County was taken by Union forces in the Civil War in October 1862. A Confederate force of about 1,500 men tried to retake Dardanelle in January 1865, failing after a four-hour battle. First Sergeant William Ellis of the 3rd Wisconsin Cavalry received a Medal of Honor for holding his position despite multiple wounds.

== Geography ==
According to the U.S. Census Bureau, the county has a total area of 949 square miles (2,460 km^{2}), of which 19 square miles (49 km^{2}) (2.0%) are covered by water.

=== Adjacent counties ===
- Pope County (north)
- Conway County (northeast)
- Perry County (east)
- Garland County (southeast)
- Montgomery County (south)
- Scott County (west)
- Logan County (northwest)

=== National protected areas ===
- Holla Bend National Wildlife Refuge (part)
- Ouachita National Forest (part)
- Ozark National Forest (part)

== Demographics ==
Historical population
Census	Pop.	Note	%±
1850	3,341		—
1860	6,333		89.6%
1870	8,048		27.1%
1880	13,852		72.1%
1890	18,015		30.1%
1900	22,750		26.3%
1910	26,323		15.7%
1920	25,655		−2.5%
1930	21,313		−16.9%
1940	20,970		−1.6%
1950	14,057		−33.0%
1960	11,940		−15.1%
1970	14,208		19.0%
1980	17,026		19.8%
1990	17,759		4.3%
2000	21,139		19.0%
2010	22,185		4.9%
2020	20,263		−8.7%
2025 (est.)	19,956	▼	−1.5%
U.S. Decennial Census; 1790–1960 1900–1990; 1990–2000 2010 2020

=== 2020 census ===
As of the 2020 census, the county had a population of 20,263. The median age was 40.3 years. 24.4% of residents were under the age of 18 and 18.4% of residents were 65 years of age or older. For every 100 females there were 99.8 males, and for every 100 females age 18 and over there were 98.1 males age 18 and over.

The racial makeup of the county was 75.7% White, 1.2% Black or African American, 1.0% American Indian and Alaska Native, 1.0% Asian, 0.1% Native Hawaiian and Pacific Islander, 12.5% from some other race, and 8.5% from two or more races. Hispanic or Latino residents of any race comprised 20.7% of the population.

19.3% of residents lived in urban areas, while 80.7% lived in rural areas.

There were 7,722 households in the county, of which 32.4% had children under the age of 18 living in them. Of all households, 50.2% were married-couple households, 19.0% were households with a male householder and no spouse or partner present, and 24.0% were households with a female householder and no spouse or partner present. About 25.6% of all households were made up of individuals and 12.5% had someone living alone who was 65 years of age or older.

There were 9,246 housing units, of which 16.5% were vacant. Among occupied housing units, 72.0% were owner-occupied and 28.0% were renter-occupied. The homeowner vacancy rate was 2.1% and the rental vacancy rate was 11.6%.

=== 2000 census ===
As of the 2000 census, 21,139 people, 7,922 households, and 5,814 families lived in the county. The population density was 23 people per square mile (8.9 people/km^{2}). The 9,157 housing units had an average density of 10 per square mile (3.9/km^{2}). The racial makeup of the county was 86.63% White, 1.47% African American, 0.58% Native American, 0.69% Asian, 0.03%Pacific Islander, 8.99% from other races, and 1.62% from two or more races. About 12.73% of the population were Hispanics or Latinos of any race. Around 12.00% reported speaking Spanish at home.

Of the 7,922 households, 33.6% had children under 18 living with them, 58.5% were married couples living together, 10.1% had a female householder with no husband present, and 26.6% were not families. About 23.2% of all households were made up of individuals, and 11.8% had someone living alone who was 65 or older. The average household size was 2.61 and the average family size was 3.04.

In the county, the age distribution was 25.8% under 18, 8.9% from 18 to 24, 28.3% from 25 to 44, 22.0% from 45 to 64, and 15.0% who were 65 or older. The median age was 36 years. For every 100 females, there were 99.5 males. For every 100 females 18 and over, there were 96.3 males.

The median income for a household in the county was $28,916, and for a family was $33,409. Males had a median income of $23,172 versus $18,148 for females. The per capita income for the county was $15,383. About 11.7% of families and 15.4% of the population were below the poverty line, including 20.2% of those under 18 and 12.8% of those 65 or over.

== Human resources ==
=== Public safety ===
The Yell County Sheriff's Office is the primary law enforcement agency in the county. The agency is led by the Yell County sheriff, an official elected by countywide vote every four years. Police departments in Dardanelle, Danville, and Ola provide law enforcement in their respective jurisdictions, with Bellville, Havana, and Plainview contracting with the Sheriff's Office for law enforcement services.

The current sheriff of Yell County is Nick Gault. He was elected to office in the 2022 general election. He will vacate the office on December 31st, 2026 after losing the Republican primary, receiving only 21%, of the total votes cast, on March 3, 2026. The chief officer of the law in Yell County, as in all Arkansas counties, is the sheriff.

Yell County Sheriffs, 1840-Present

Yell County Sheriffs
Name	Year elected	Year left	Total lears	Notable accomplishments
Theodore P Sadler	1840	1846	6	First county sheriff
S. Kirkpatrick	1846	1852	6	
Joseph Garrett	1852	1854	2	
J. C. Herin	1854	1856	2	
Joseph Gault	1856	1862	6	
Lorenzo Free	1862	1863	1	
O. Wood	1863	1864	1	
William Henry Ferguson	1864	1871	7	
Jesse George	1871	1872	1	
J. A. Wilson	1872	1874	2	
Reuben E. Cole	1874	1880	6	
Levi L. Briggs	1880	1882	2	
Joseph L. Davis	1882	1886	4	
H. B. McCarrell	1886	1890	4	
Joseph Haston Howard	1890	1892	2	
Sam Gordon Albright	1892	1896	4	
B. H. Burnett	1896	1900	6	
James M. Cole	1900	1904	4	
William Franklin Briggs	1904	1906	2	
William L. Tatum	1906	1910	4	
Theodore Riley Gault	1910	1914	4	
Will T. Caviness	1914	1919	5	
J. N. George	1919	1923	4	
Joe D. Gault	1923	1926	3	
Baxter Gatlin	1927	1930	3	
Buford Compton	1931	1946	15	
Earl E Lad	1947	1956	9	
Herman D. McCormick	1957	1968	11	
Carlos Mitchell	1969	1976	7	Construction of the old Danville Jail (replaced in 2016); Construction of the old Dardanelle Jail (replaced in 2016)
Hartsell Lewis	1977	1978	1	
Denver Dennis	1979	1988	9	
Mike May	1989	1992	3	
Loyd W. Maughn	1993	1998	5	Construction of Juvenile Detention Center (1997)
Bill Gilkey	1999	March 31, 2022	23 Years 3 Months	Construction of New Law Enforcement Center and Jail (2016); Longest serving sheriff in Yell Count (2017); Longest current serving sheriff in Arkansas (2017); In 2017, he became the longest currently serving sheriff in Arkansas, after 19 years in the office. He is also the longest-serving sheriff in the county's history. Gilkey has sat on state boards such as the Arkansas Crime Lab Board and Arkansas Act 309 Board. Gilkey is credited with the creation of the Yell County Law Enforcement Center in 2016, which replaced two of the county's older jails that did not meet state standards, and houses the sheriff's office. The new building also houses CID offices, revenue office, and an updated E911 dispatch center.
Heath Tate	April 1, 2022	December 31, 2022	9 Months	Interim sheriff after Gilkey's retirement in March 2022.
Nick Gault	January 1, 2023	December 31, 2026	4 Years	Lost primary election on March 3, 2026 by 79% of the total votes.
Rick Padgett	January 1, 2027	Term Pending	4 Years	Became sheriff-elect May 1, 2026. Opposing candidates failed to file required independent signatures by the 12:00 PM deadline.

== Culture and contemporary life ==
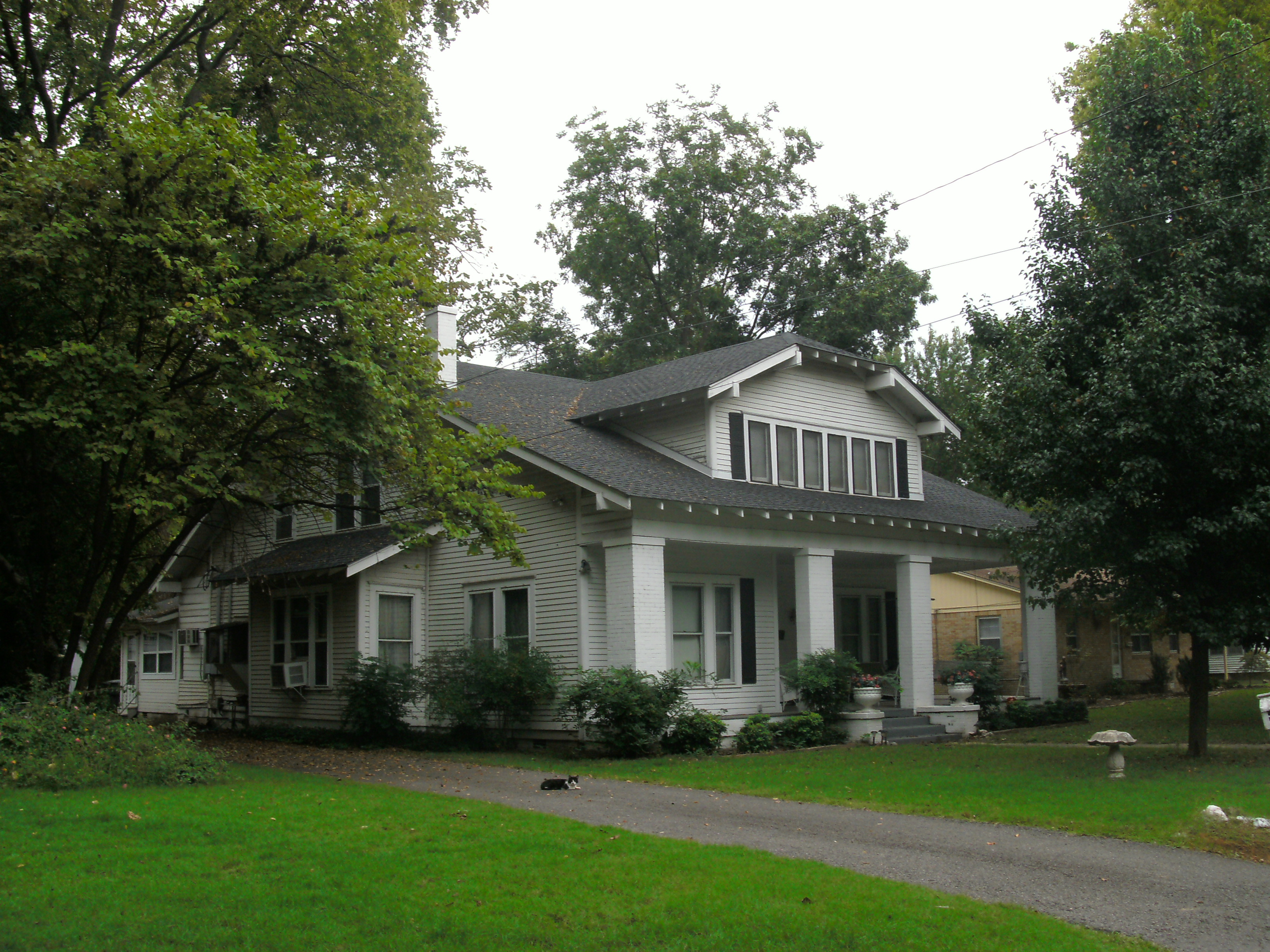
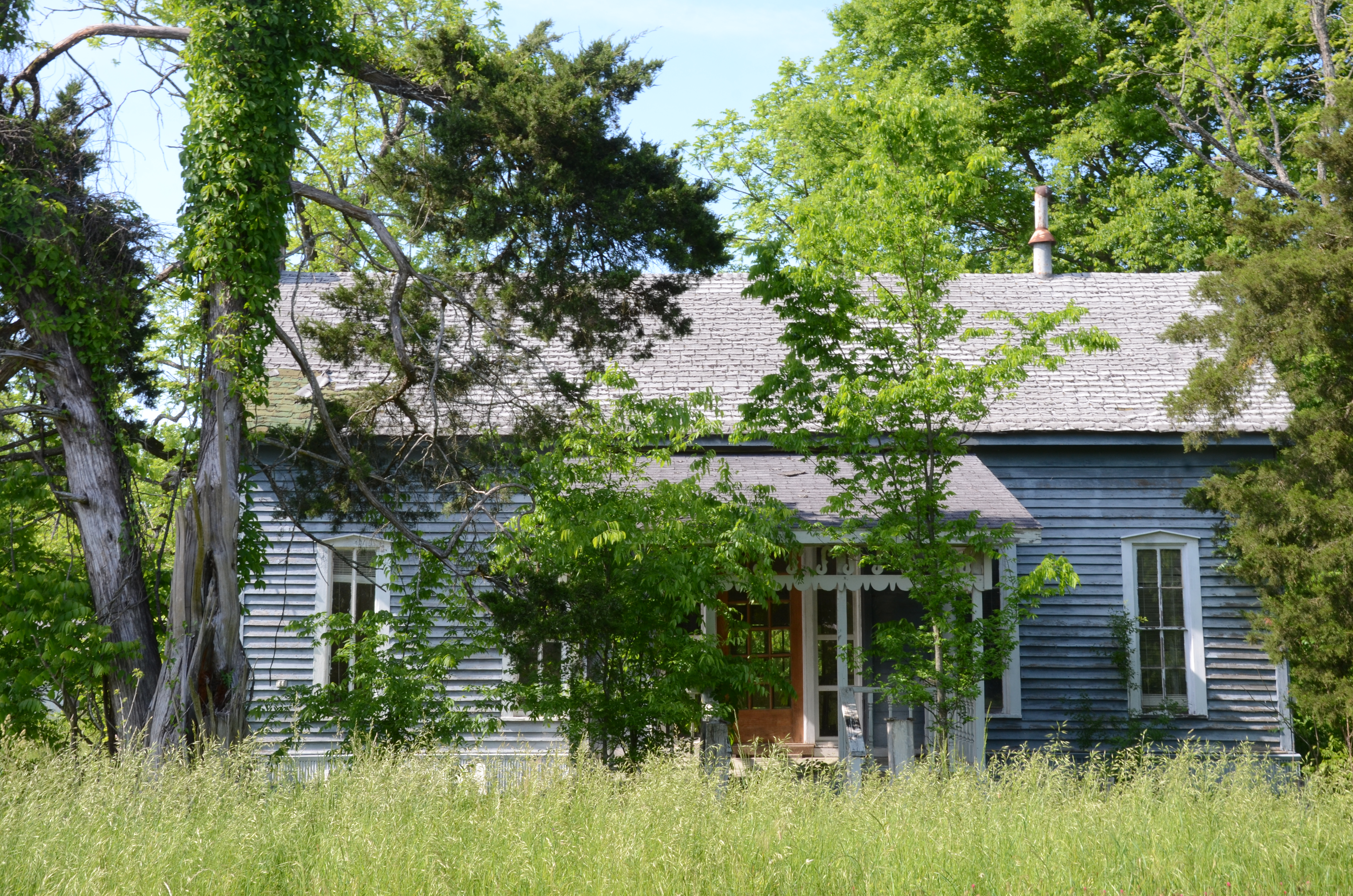
Two homes listed on the National Register of historic Places in Yell County: the Thomas James Cotton House in Dardanelle (left) and the Mitchell House in rural Waltreak

Yell County has several historical homes, structures, and monuments dedicated to preserving the history and culture of the area. The Dardanelle Commercial Historic District preserves the historic commercial hub of Yell County along the Arkansas River. The Mt. Nebo State Park Cabins Historic District preserves ten cabins built by the Civilian Conservation Corps in the 1930s. The county also has seven homes, three churches, and two bridges listed on the NRHP.

Upon settlement, Yell County's varied topography created a stratified society, splitting settlers between the more fertile and productive farms of the "lowlands" and the subsistence farming of the steep and less-productive mountain soil of the "uplands". A planter class emerged in the lowlands, and as Dardanelle evolved into a cohesive community, the large landowners moved to town and managed their landholdings from stately homes, similar to the model seen in the Arkansas Delta and the Mississippi Delta. This left the lowlands inhabited largely by poor sharecroppers and tenant farmers, who largely shared economic fortunes with the small farms in the uplands, shifting the "upland/lowland" split to a "town-country" divide based largely on economics.

As mechanization and society evolved and Arkansas became less of a frontier, a wealthy upper class emerged in Dardanelle that came to wield societal, political, and economic power in the county. This society remained relatively closed, with separate social events and often summering on Mount Nebo with other wealthy Arkansans visiting to enjoy the cool mountain breezes. With little of the industrialization that defined the Gilded Age in the Northeast and Midwest, Yell County instead retained an adjusted Old South economic model based on agriculture but adapted to a post-Reconstruction reality.

== Government ==
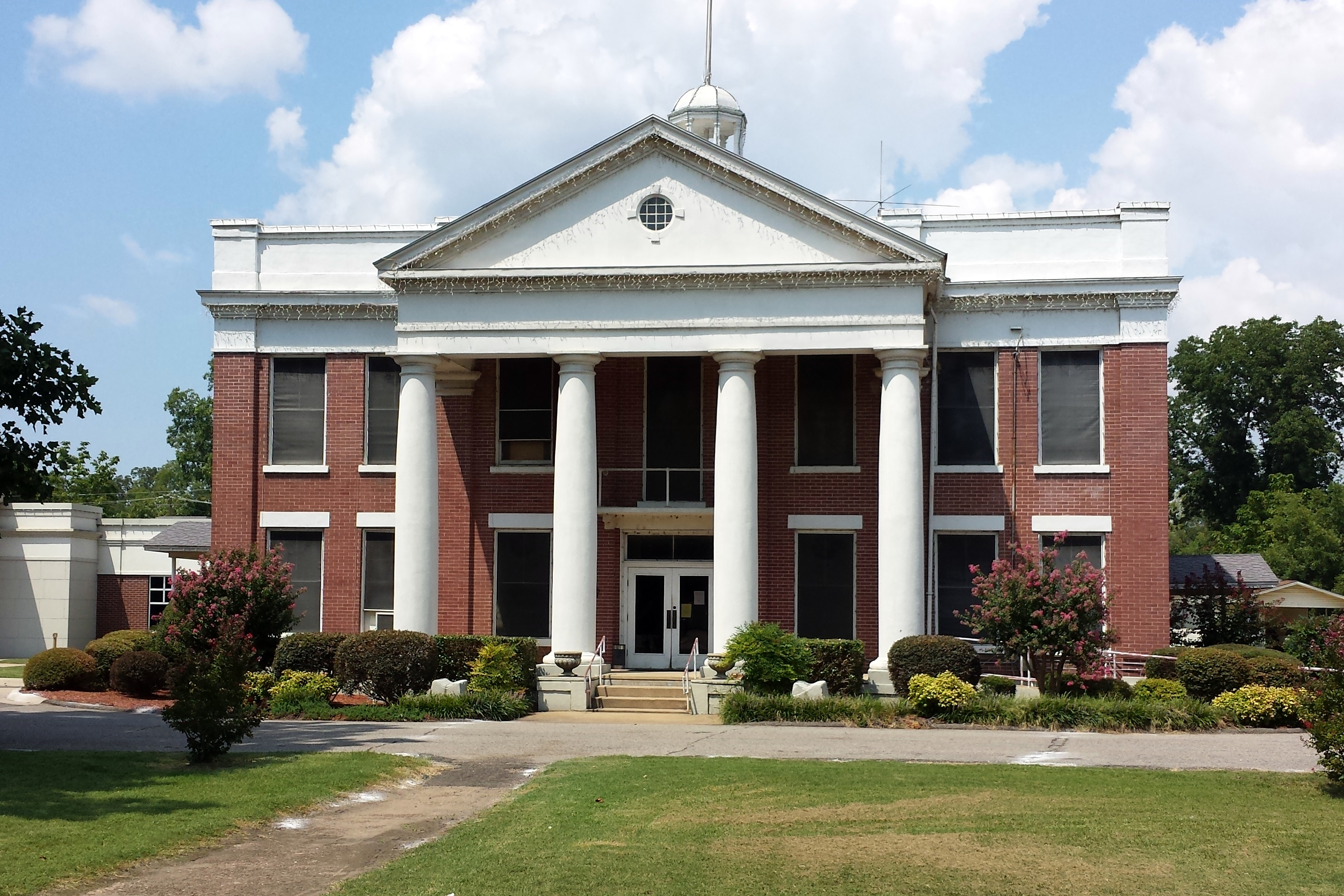
Yell County Eastern District Courthouse in Dardanelle

The county government is a constitutional body granted specific powers by the Constitution of Arkansas and the Arkansas Code. The quorum court is the legislative branch of the county government and controls all spending and revenue collection. Representatives are called justices of the peace and are elected from county districts every even-numbered year. The number of districts in a county vary from nine to fifteen, and district boundaries are drawn by the county election commission. The Yell County Quorum Court has eleven members. Presiding over quorum court meetings is the county judge, who serves as the chief operating officer of the county. The county judge is elected at-large and does not vote in quorum court business, although capable of vetoing quorum court decisions. Though Yell County has two county seats, the constitutional officers are not duplicated, with duties split between the two courthouses.

Yell County, Arkansas Elected countywide officials
Position	Officeholder	Party
County Judge	Jeff Gilkey	Republican
County/Circuit Clerk	Anna Ward	Republican
Sheriff	Nick Gault	Republican
Treasurer	Debra Craig	Republican
Collector	Christie Davis	Republican
Assessor	Sherry Hicks	Republican
Coroner	Tel Millard	(Unknown)

The composition of the Quorum Court following the 2024 elections is 11 Republicans. Justices of the Peace (members) of the Quorum Court following the elections are:

- District 1: Brent Montgomery (R)
- District 2: Greg Dixon (R)
- District 3: Richard Padgett (R)
- District 4: Steven Payton (R)
- District 5: Robert Caldwell (R)
- District 6: Mike Taylor (R)
- District 7: James Brown (R)
- District 8: Carl Cross (R)
- District 9: Jeffrey Lewis (R)
- District 10: Tony Sigle (R)
- District 11: Jimmy Davenport (R)

Additionally, the townships of Yell County are entitled to elect their own respective constables, as set forth by the Constitution of Arkansas. Constables are largely of historical significance as they were used to keep the peace in rural areas when travel was more difficult. The township constables as of the 2024 elections are:

- Crawford: William H. Gossett Jr. (Independent)
- Danville: Bradley Apple (R)
- Dardanelle: Gary Dennis (R)
- Ferguson: Kenneth Jackson (R)
- Magazine 1: Marty Weatherford (R)
- Riley: David Campbell (R)
- Ward: Ritchie Tippin (R)

=== Politics ===
Over the past few election cycles Yell County has trended heavily towards the GOP. The last Democratic presidential candidate to carry this county was native Arkansan Bill Clinton in 1996.

United States presidential election results for Yell County, Arkansas
Year	Republican		Democratic		Third party(ies)	
Year	No.	%	No.	%	No.	%
1896	812	26.32%	2,261	73.29%	12	0.39%
1900	798	33.73%	1,554	65.68%	14	0.59%
1904	913	44.32%	1,079	52.38%	68	3.30%
1908	1,040	34.70%	1,743	58.16%	214	7.14%
1912	436	17.18%	1,401	55.20%	701	27.62%
1916	781	27.12%	2,099	72.88%	0	0.00%
1920	1,042	34.21%	1,925	63.20%	79	2.59%
1924	334	19.15%	1,314	75.34%	96	5.50%
1928	802	27.65%	2,086	71.91%	13	0.45%
1932	272	11.88%	2,010	87.77%	8	0.35%
1936	318	11.78%	2,382	88.22%	0	0.00%
1940	224	9.08%	2,236	90.64%	7	0.28%
1944	489	22.94%	1,642	77.02%	1	0.05%
1948	408	16.85%	1,866	77.08%	147	6.07%
1952	1,243	39.54%	1,884	59.92%	17	0.54%
1956	1,381	40.70%	2,008	59.18%	4	0.12%
1960	1,303	37.96%	2,008	58.49%	122	3.55%
1964	1,527	30.86%	3,407	68.86%	14	0.28%
1968	1,819	34.44%	1,513	28.65%	1,949	36.91%
1972	3,310	66.48%	1,669	33.52%	0	0.00%
1976	1,932	25.04%	5,785	74.96%	0	0.00%
1980	3,187	44.65%	3,702	51.87%	248	3.47%
1984	4,051	59.56%	2,679	39.39%	72	1.06%
1988	3,535	55.84%	2,763	43.64%	33	0.52%
1992	2,506	32.79%	4,165	54.49%	972	12.72%
1996	2,111	31.77%	3,749	56.43%	784	11.80%
2000	3,223	49.75%	3,062	47.26%	194	2.99%
2004	3,678	55.23%	2,913	43.75%	68	1.02%
2008	3,808	63.09%	2,003	33.18%	225	3.73%
2012	4,042	67.66%	1,722	28.82%	210	3.52%
2016	4,608	71.56%	1,480	22.98%	351	5.45%
2020	5,226	77.53%	1,284	19.05%	231	3.43%
2024	5,147	79.47%	1,213	18.73%	117	1.81%

== Education ==
=== Public education ===
Early childhood, elementary and secondary education within Yell County is provided by four public school districts:

- Danville School District
- Dardanelle School District
- Two Rivers School District—formed in 2004 by the consolidation of the former Fourche Valley School District, Ola School District, Perry–Casa School District, and Plainview–Rover School District.
- Western Yell County School District—formed in 1985 by the consolidation of the former Belleville School District and Havana School District.

=== Dissolved school districts ===
- Fourche Valley School District
- Ola School District
- Perry–Casa School District
- Plainview-Rover School District
- Havana School District
- Belleville School District
- Carden Bottoms School District

=== Public libraries ===
The Arkansas River Valley Regional Library System, is headquartered in Dardanelle and serves multiple counties and consists of one central library and six branch libraries, including the Yell County Library, a branch library in Danville.

== Communities ==
=== Cities ===
- Belleville
- Danville (county seat)
- Dardanelle (county seat)
- Havana
- Ola
- Plainview

=== Town ===
- Corinth

=== Census-designated places ===
- Centerville
- Rover

=== Unincorporated communities ===
- Alpha
- Aly
- Ard
- Bluffton
- Briggsville
- Chickalah
- Goodie Gorn Creek
- Gravelly
- Mount George
- New Neely
- Onyx
- Pleasant Hill
- Sulphur Springs
- Wing

=== Townships ===
Townships in Arkansas are the divisions of a county. Each township includes unincorporated areas; some may have incorporated cities or towns within part of their boundaries. Arkansas townships have limited purposes in modern times. However, the United States census does list Arkansas population based on townships (sometimes referred to as "county subdivisions" or "minor civil divisions"). Townships are also of value for historical purposes in terms of genealogical research. Each town or city is within one or more townships in an Arkansas county based on census maps and publications. The townships of Yell County are listed below; listed in parentheses are the cities, towns, and/or census-designated places that are fully or partially inside the township.

- Birta
- Bluffton
- Briggsville
- Centerville
- Chula
- Compton
- Crawford
- Danville (Corinth, Danville)
- Dardanelle (Dardanelle)
- Dutch Creek
- Ferguson (Belleville)
- Galla Rock
- Gilkey
- Gravelly Hill
- Herring
- Ions Creek
- Lamar (Plainview)
- Magazine
- Mason
- Mountain
- Prairie
- Richland
- Riley (Havana)
- Rover
- Sulphur Springs
- Ward (Ola)
- Waveland

== Infrastructure ==
=== Major highways ===
- Highway 7
- Highway 10
- Highway 22
- Highway 27
- Highway 28
- Highway 60
- Highway 80
- Highway 154
- Highway 155
- Highway 307
- Highway 309
- Highway 314

== Notable people ==
- John Daly, professional golfer
- Arthur Hunnicutt, Academy Award-nominated Western Actor
- Johnny Sain, Major League Baseball player
- William L. Spicer, Republican state chairman, 1962–1964, was born in Yell County, but owned a chain of drive-in theaters in Fort Smith
- Cousins Jim Walkup (left-handed pitcher), and Jim Walkup (right-handed pitcher), MLB pitchers
- James Lee Witt, former FEMA Director
- Henry C. Bruton, Rear Admiral in the United States Navy, born in Belleville, Arkansas in 1905
- Jacob Lofland, American actor

== See also ==
- List of lakes in Yell County, Arkansas
- National Register of Historic Places listings in Yell County, Arkansas
