= Perry-Casa School District =

Former school district in Arkansas

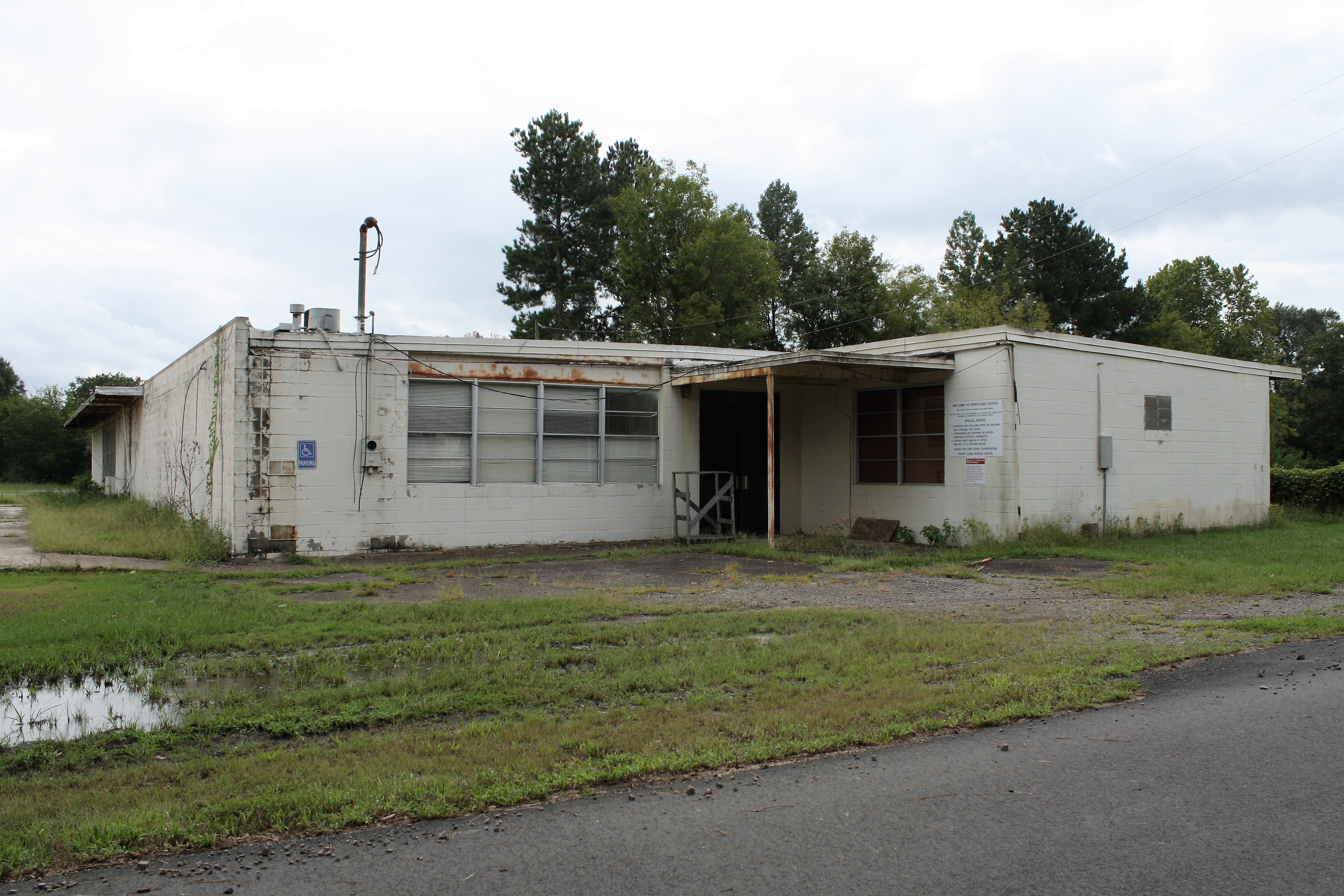
Perry-Casa High School

Perry–Casa School District No. 2 was a school district with its school, the Perry-Casa School, in Casa, Arkansas. Serving the Perry County communities of Casa and Perry, it operated elementary school and high school divisions. Its mascot was the tiger.

By 2004 new laws were passed requiring school districts with enrollments below 350 to consolidate with other school districts. The school boards of the Perry-Casa district and the Ola School District agreed to a consolidation in which Perry-Casa annexes Ola, and voters in those districts approved the plans. On July 1, 2004, it merged with those districts and others into the Two Rivers School District.
