= Antioch Township, White County, Arkansas =

Township in Arkansas, United States

Antioch Township
- Township
- Location in Arkansas Antioch Township (the United States)
- Coordinates: 35°08′28″N 91°56′25″W
- Country: United States
- State: Arkansas
- County: White

Area
  - Total: 14.880 sq mi (38.54 km^{2})
  - Land: 14.880 sq mi (38.54 km^{2})
  - Water: 0.000 sq mi (0 km^{2})
- Elevation: 400 ft (120 m)

Population (2010)
  - Total: 562
  - Density: 37.8/sq mi (14.6/km^{2})
- Time zone: UTC-6 (CST)
  - Summer (DST): UTC-5 (CDT)
- FIPS code: 05-90042
- GNIS ID: 69814

Antioch Township is a township in White County, Arkansas, United States. Its total population was 562 as of the 2010 United States census, an increase of 15.4 percent from 487 at the 2000 census.

According to the 2010 Census, Antioch Township is located at 35°08′28″N 91°56′25″W (35.141235, -91.940339). It has a total area of 14.880 square miles (38.54 square kilometers), all of which is land. As per the USGS National Elevation Dataset, the elevation is 400 feet (122 m).
