= Ola School District =

Defunct school district in Arkansas, United States

Ola School District No. 10 or Ola Public Schools was a school district headquartered in Ola, Arkansas. Earl E. Jamison, Jr. was the last superintendent. Ola Elementary School and Ola High School were its schools.

Ola Elementary School had four buildings; the main building and gymnasium were made of natural rock and opened in 1941. Circa 2001 it had 320 students. Circa 2001 the school district in total had 560 students.

By 2004 new laws were passed requiring school districts with enrollments below 350 to consolidate with other school districts. The school boards of the Ola district and the Perry-Casa School District agreed to a consolidation in which Perry-Casa annexes Ola, and voters in those districts approved the plans. On July 1, 2004, it merged with the following and other districts into the Two Rivers School District.
