= Antioch Township, Hot Spring County, Arkansas =

Township in Arkansas, United States

Antioch Township
- Township
- Location in Arkansas Antioch Township (the United States)
- Coordinates: 34°18′31″N 92°59′33″W
- Country: United States
- State: Arkansas
- County: Hot Spring

Area
  - Total: 14.310 sq mi (37.06 km^{2})
  - Land: 14.310 sq mi (37.06 km^{2})
  - Water: 0.000 sq mi (0 km^{2})
- Elevation: 446 ft (136 m)

Population (2010)
  - Total: 432
  - Density: 30.2/sq mi (11.7/km^{2})
- Time zone: UTC-6 (CST)
  - Summer (DST): UTC-5 (CDT)
- FIPS code: 05-90039
- GNIS ID: 66651

Antioch Township is a township in Hot Spring County, Arkansas, United States. Its total population was 432 as of the 2010 United States census, an increase of 12.21 percent from 385 at the 2000 census.

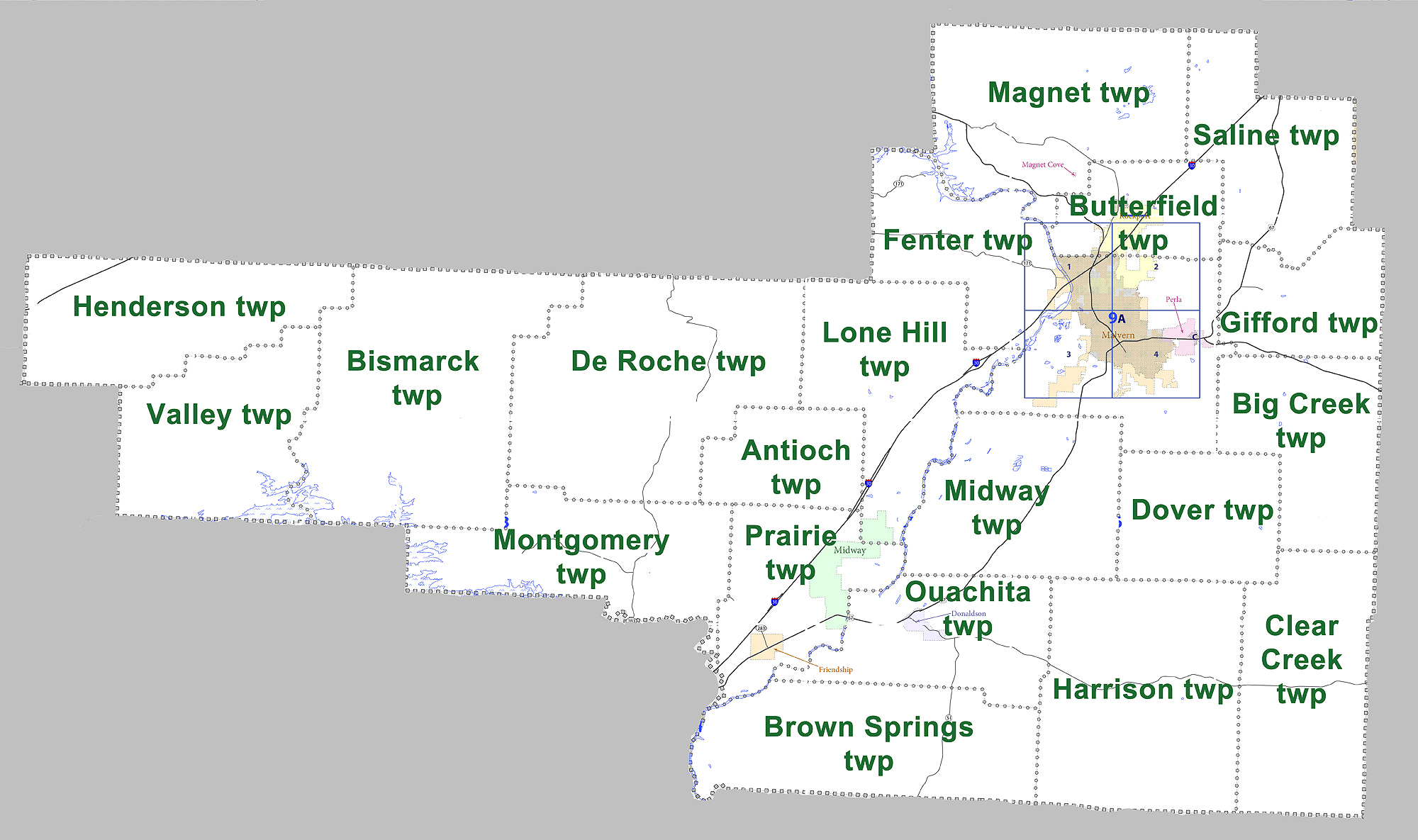
Townships in Hot Spring County as of 2010

According to the 2010 Census, Antioch Township is located at 34°18′31″N 92°59′33″W (34.308717, -92.992549). It has a total area of 14.310 square miles (37.06 square kilometers), all of which is land. As per the USGS National Elevation Dataset, the elevation is 446 feet (136 m).
