= Ola, Arkansas =

- City
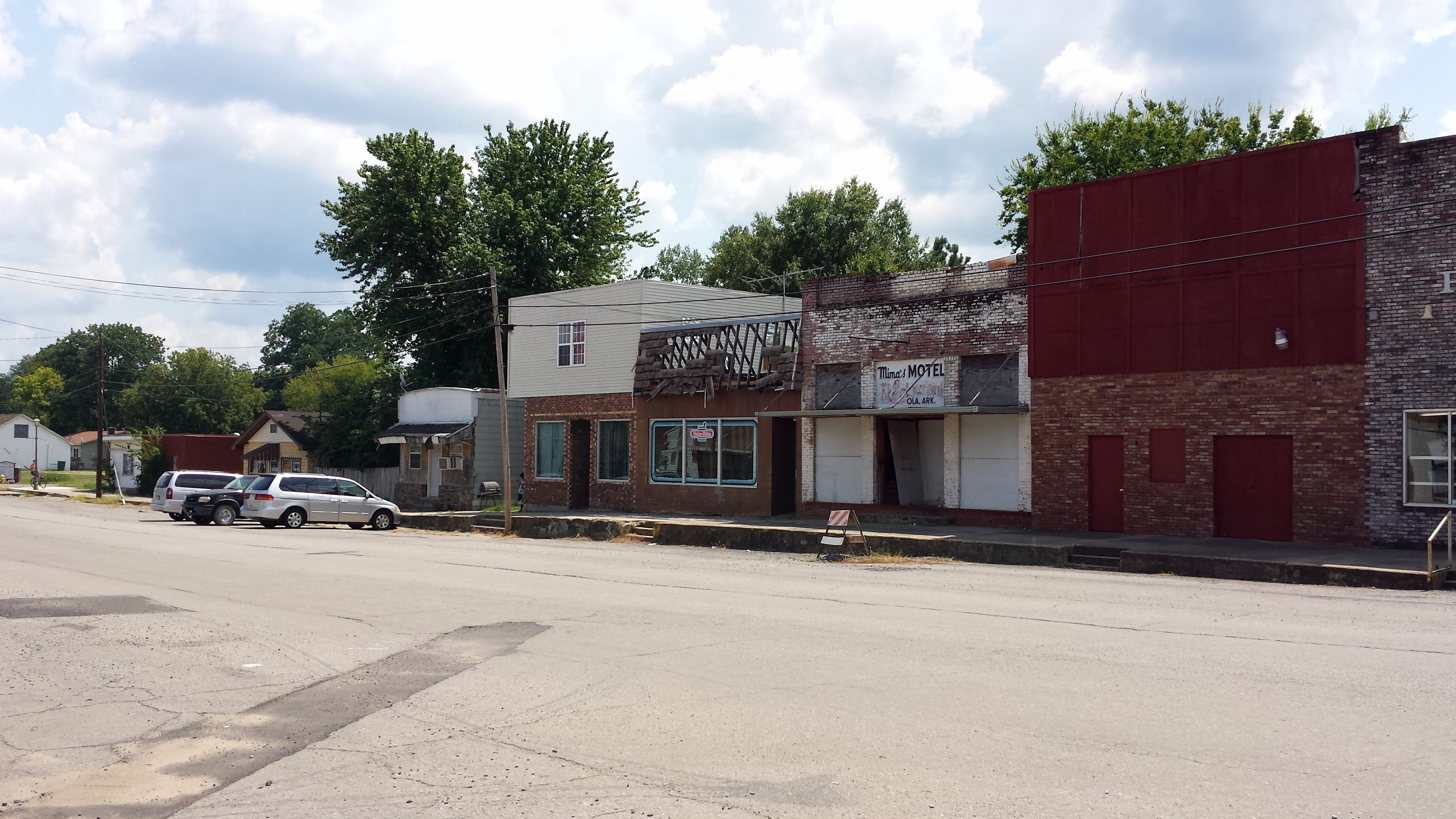
- Looking east down Highway 10 in Ola

- Location of Ola in Yell County, Arkansas.
- Coordinates: 35°01′52″N 93°13′28″W
- Country: United States
- State: Arkansas
- County: Yell

Area
  - Total: 1.83 sq mi (4.75 km^{2})
  - Land: 1.70 sq mi (4.41 km^{2})
  - Water: 0.14 sq mi (0.35 km^{2})
- Elevation: 348 ft (106 m)

Population (2020)
  - Total: 934
  - Estimate (2025): 921 ▼
  - Density: 549.0/sq mi (211.98/km^{2})
- Time zone: UTC−06:00 (Central (CST))
  - Summer (DST): UTC−05:00 (CDT)
- ZIP Code: 72853
- Area code: 479
- FIPS code: 05-51560
- GNIS feature ID: 2404426

Ola is a city in Yell County, Arkansas, United States. As of the 2020 census, Ola had a population of 934. It is roughly 15 miles south of the Russellville Metropolitan area.

As of 2004 it serves as a commercial center in Yell County.

== Geography ==
According to the United States Census Bureau, the city has a total area of 2.0 square miles (5.2 km^{2}), of which 1.9 square miles (4.9 km^{2}) is land and 0.1 square miles (0.26 km^{2}) (6.53%) is water.

=== Climate ===
The climate in this area is characterized by hot, humid summers and generally mild to cool winters. According to the Köppen Climate Classification system, Ola has a humid subtropical climate, classified "Cfa" on climate maps.

== Demographics ==
Historical population
Census	Pop.	Note	%±
1910	516		—
1920	655		26.9%
1930	648		−1.1%
1940	839		29.5%
1950	880		4.9%
1960	805		−8.5%
1970	1,029		27.8%
1980	1,121		8.9%
1990	1,090		−2.8%
2000	1,204		10.5%
2010	1,281		6.4%
2020	934		−27.1%
2025 (est.)	921	▼	−1.4%
U.S. Decennial Census

=== 2020 census ===
Ola racial composition
Race	Number	Percentage
White (non-Hispanic)	664	71.09%
Black or African American (non-Hispanic)	7	0.75%
Native American	5	0.54%
Asian	6	0.64%
Other/Mixed	36	3.85%
Hispanic or Latino	216	23.13%

As of the 2020 United States census, there were 934 people, 481 households, and 278 families residing in the city.

=== 2000 census ===
As of the census of 2000, there were 1,204 people, 464 households, and 283 families residing in the city. The population density was 648.4 inhabitants per square mile (250.3/km^{2}). There were 556 housing units at an average density of 299.4 per square mile (115.6/km^{2}). The racial makeup of the city was 83.89% White, 0.42% Black or African American, 0.25% Native American, 0.25% Asian, 0.17% Pacific Islander, 12.96% from other races, and 2.08% from two or more races. 16.86% of the population were Hispanic or Latino of any race.

There were 464 households, out of which 33.6% had children under the age of 18 living with them, 41.6% were married couples living together, 14.2% had a female householder with no husband present, and 39.0% were non-families. 34.5% of all households were made up of individuals, and 17.9% had someone living alone who was 65 years of age or older. The average household size was 2.44 and the average family size was 3.18.

In the city, the population was spread out, with 28.3% under the age of 18, 8.3% from 18 to 24, 26.5% from 25 to 44, 18.9% from 45 to 64, and 18.0% who were 65 years of age or older. The median age was 36 years. For every 100 females, there were 88.1 males. For every 100 females age 18 and over, there were 84.0 males.

The median income for a household in the city was $19,375, and the median income for a family was $24,125. Males had a median income of $21,250 versus $16,100 for females. The per capita income for the city was $10,117. About 20.1% of families and 27.2% of the population were below the poverty line, including 36.9% of those under age 18 and 29.9% of those age 65 or over.

== Education ==
Public education is administered by the Two Rivers School District, which supports :

- Two Rivers High School—Serves students in grades 7–12.
- Two Rivers Elementary School—Serves students in kindergarten through sixth grade.

It was previously in the Ola School District until July 1, 2004, when it merged into the Two Rivers School District. The merged district formerly operated Ola Elementary School and Ola High School. Ola Elementary School had four buildings; the main building and gymnasium were made of natural rock and opened in 1941. Circa 2001 it had 320 students.

In 2010 Ola High closed as Two Rivers High opened. In 2012 Ola Elementary closed as Two Rivers Elementary opened.

== Notable people ==
- Babe Ellison, Major League Baseball player, member of Pacific Coast League Hall of Fame
- Mary McCormic, operatic soprano and a professor of opera
