= Plainview, Arkansas =

- City
- Location of Plainview in Yell County, Arkansas.
- Coordinates: 34°59′24″N 93°17′53″W
- Country: United States
- State: Arkansas
- County: Yell

Area
  - Total: 1.46 sq mi (3.77 km^{2})
  - Land: 1.46 sq mi (3.77 km^{2})
  - Water: 0 sq mi (0.00 km^{2})
- Elevation: 417 ft (127 m)

Population (2020)
  - Total: 467
  - Estimate (2025): 457 ▼
  - Density: 320.4/sq mi (123.72/km^{2})
- Time zone: UTC-6 (Central (CST))
  - Summer (DST): UTC-5 (CDT)
- ZIP code: 72857
- Area code: 479
- FIPS code: 05-55970
- GNIS feature ID: 2404531

Plainview is a city in Yell County, Arkansas, United States. As of the 2020 census, Plainview had a population of 467. It is part of the Russellville Micropolitan Statistical Area.

== Geography ==
According to the United States Census Bureau, the city has a total area of 1.4 square miles (3.6 km^{2}), all land.

== Demographics ==
Historical population
Census	Pop.	Note	%±
1910	853		—
1920	990		16.1%
1930	654		−33.9%
1940	704		7.6%
1950	637		−9.5%
1960	548		−14.0%
1970	677		23.5%
1980	752		11.1%
1990	685		−8.9%
2000	755		10.2%
2010	608		−19.5%
2020	467		−23.2%
2025 (est.)	457	▼	−2.1%
U.S. Decennial Census

As of the census of 2000, there were 755 people, 287 households, and 212 families residing in the city. The population density was 522.7 inhabitants per square mile (201.8/km^{2}). There were 347 housing units at an average density of 240.3 per square mile (92.8/km^{2}). The racial makeup of the city was 92.85% White, 0.13% Black or African American, 0.53% Native American, 6.36% from other races, and 0.13% from two or more races. 6.36% of the population were Hispanic or Latino of any race.

There were 287 households, out of which 34.8% had children under the age of 18 living with them, 56.8% were married couples living together, 10.1% had a female householder with no husband present, and 26.1% were non-families. 24.4% of all households were made up of individuals, and 13.6% had someone living alone who was 65 years of age or older. The average household size was 2.63 and the average family size was 3.06.

In the city, the population was spread out, with 28.2% under the age of 18, 10.3% from 18 to 24, 26.4% from 25 to 44, 17.1% from 45 to 64, and 18.0% who were 65 years of age or older. The median age was 34 years. For every 100 females, there were 97.6 males. For every 100 females age 18 and over, there were 97.8 males.

The median income for a household in the city was $26,583, and the median income for a family was $30,500. Males had a median income of $19,444 versus $20,000 for females. The per capita income for the city was $16,247. About 7.5% of families and 14.3% of the population were below the poverty line, including 19.1% of those under age 18 and 10.7% of those age 65 or over.

== Education ==
Public education is administered by the Two Rivers School District, which supports:

- Two Rivers High School—Serves students in grades 7–12.
- Two Rivers Elementary School—Serves students in Kindergarten through 6th grade.

It was previously in the Plainview-Rover School District until July 1, 2004, when it merged into the Two Rivers School District. The merged district formerly operated Plainview-Rover Elementary School (later Plainview Elementary School) and Plainview-Rover High School. In 2010 Plainview-Rover High closed as Two Rivers High opened. In 2012 Plainview Elementary closed as Two Rivers Elementary opened.
