= List of municipalities in Arkansas =

List of cities and towns in the U.S. state of Arkansas

Map of the United States with Arkansas highlighted

Arkansas municipalities

Arkansas is a state in the Southern United States. According to the 2020 United States census, it is the 33rd most populous state with 3,011,524 inhabitants and the 27th largest by land area spanning 52,035 square miles (134,770 km^{2}) of land. Arkansas is divided into 75 counties and contains 500 (Note: Bethel Heights was annexed by Springdale in 2020.) (Note: Holiday Island incorporated on December 3, 2020.) (Note: On October 14, 2021, the Jerome City Council elected to surrender the town's charter and officially declared Jerome inactive and no longer in existence.) municipalities consisting of cities and towns as of the 2020 United States census.

Arkansas municipalities are divided into three categories based on population. Cities of the first class have or have had a population over 2,500, cities of the second class have between 500 and 2,499 people, and incorporated towns have 499 or fewer people; state law, however, provides mechanisms for a municipality to increase or decrease its classification despite not meeting the usual population requirement. Several classes of municipalities in Arkansas have different obligations, with incorporated towns often having less.

The largest municipality by population is the state capital of Little Rock with 202,591 residents while the smallest by population is Victoria with 20 residents. The largest municipality by land area is Little Rock, which spans 120.046 mi^{2} (310.92 km^{2}), while the smallest is Oakhaven at 0.046 mi^{2} (0.12 km^{2}).

== Classification of municipalities ==
Arkansas municipalities are divided into three categories based on population according to the laws in the 2020 Arkansas Code Title 14. The state does not use villages or civil townships as possible designations for its minor civil divisions.

=== City (first class) ===
Cities of the first class have a population over 2,500 and elect two council members per ward (elected at-large or by ward, or both). Any municipal expense over $20,000 goes to bidding by default in cities of the first class only. Only cities of the first class must hold elections for vacant mayoralty lasting more than one year, and must elect a city attorney to a four-year term. Cities of the first class must have a city clerk and may have a treasurer elected for a four-year term (or the role combined with city clerk). Cities of the first class must create a planning commission with at least five members and may have a police department superintended by a mayor. There are retirement benefits available if certain conditions are met for mayors and city clerks or treasurers.

=== City (second class) ===
Cities of the second class have a population between 500 and 2,499 people and elect two council members per ward (elected at-large or by ward, or both). A city of the second class must have a recorder and may have a treasurer elected for a four-year term (or the role combined with city clerk). Cities of the second class do not need to create a separate planning commission and may allow city councilors to serve as the planning commission. Cities of the second class may have a police department, a marshal or a department of public safety. There are retirement benefits available if certain conditions are met for mayors and city clerks or treasurers.

=== Town ===
Towns have a population of 499 or fewer people and elect five council members at-large with no wards. Towns must have a treasurer-recorder as a single position. Towns may have a police department, a marshal or a department of public safety. No prescribed retirement benefits are available for mayors and clerks or treasurers of towns.

== List of municipalities ==
Largest municipalities in Arkansas by population

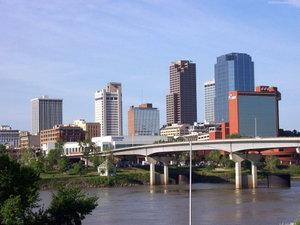
Little Rock is Arkansas's state capital and most populous city.

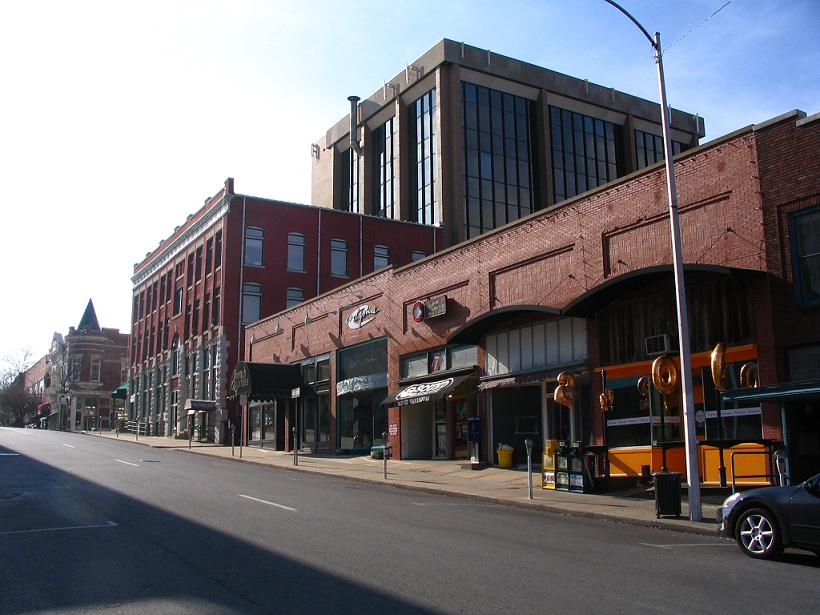
Fayetteville is Arkansas's second most populous municipality.

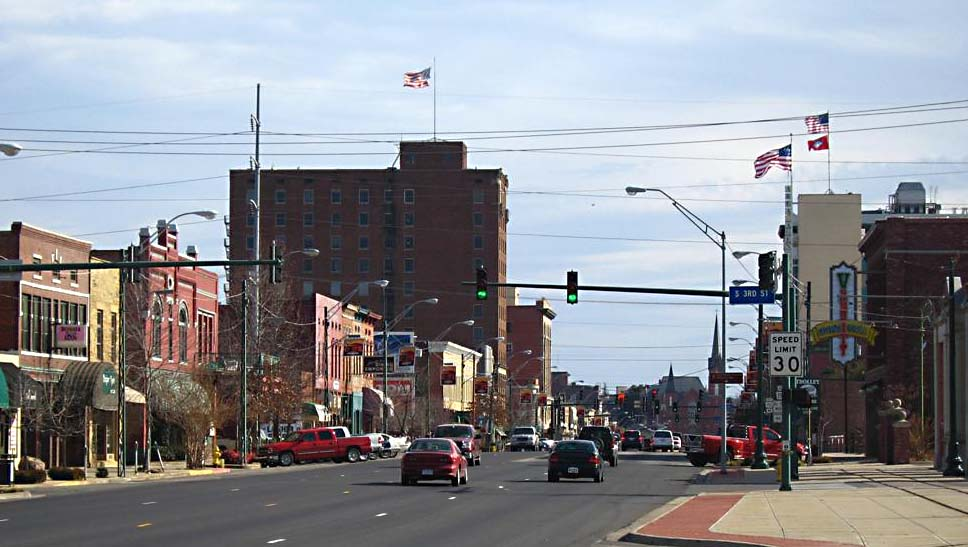
The third most populous municipality in Arkansas is Fort Smith.

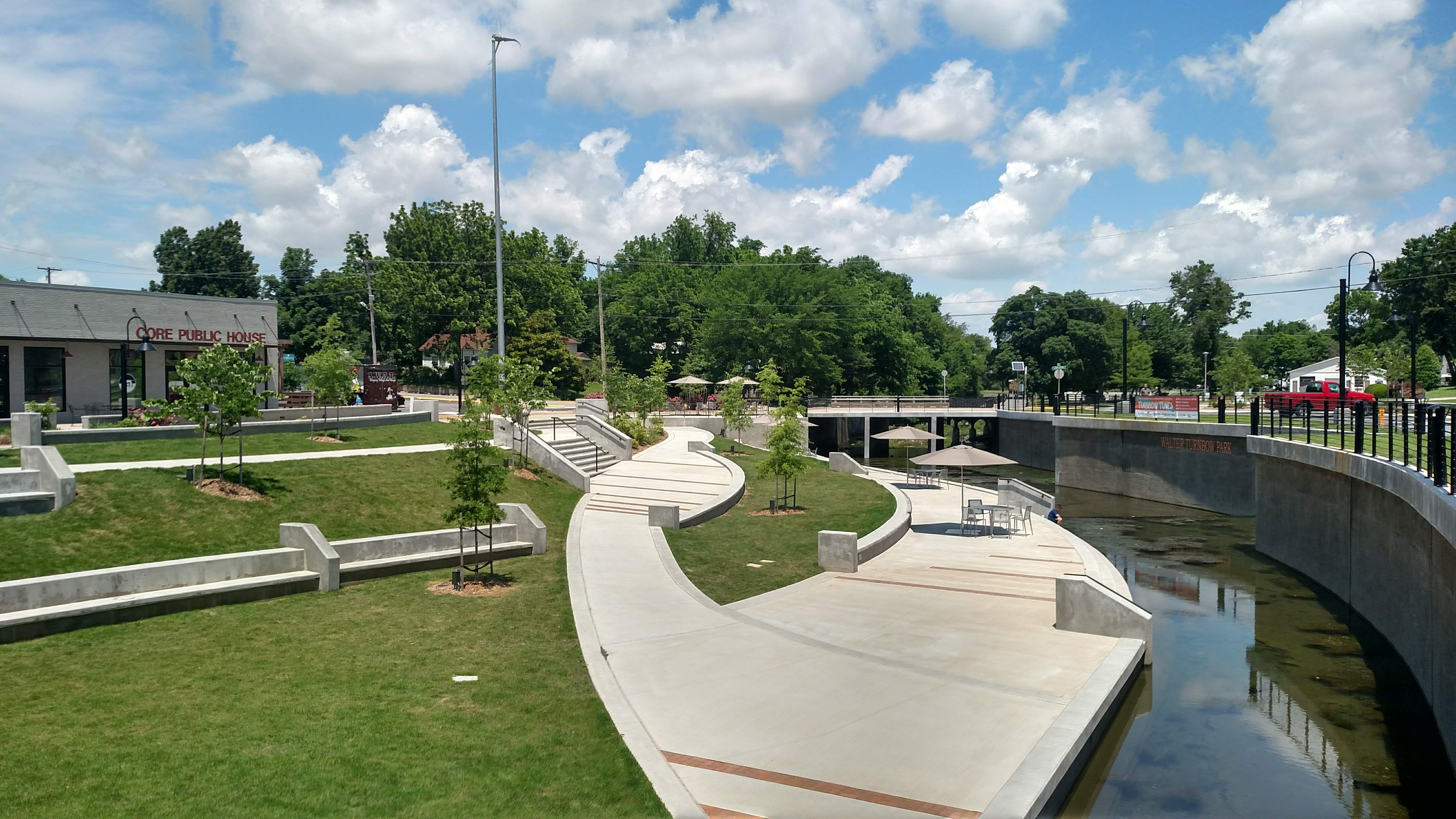
Springdale is Arkansas's fourth largest municipality by population.

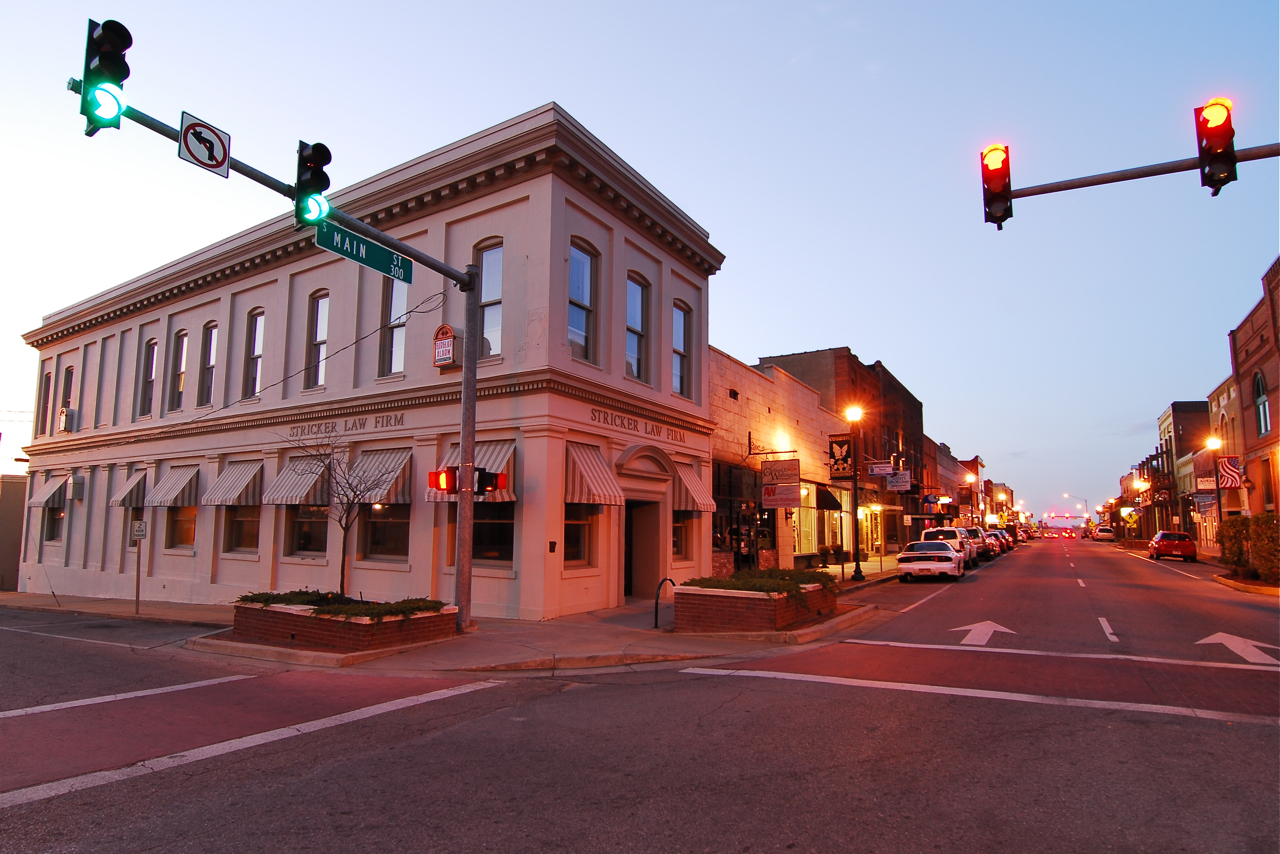
Jonesboro is the fifth most populous municipality in Arkansas.

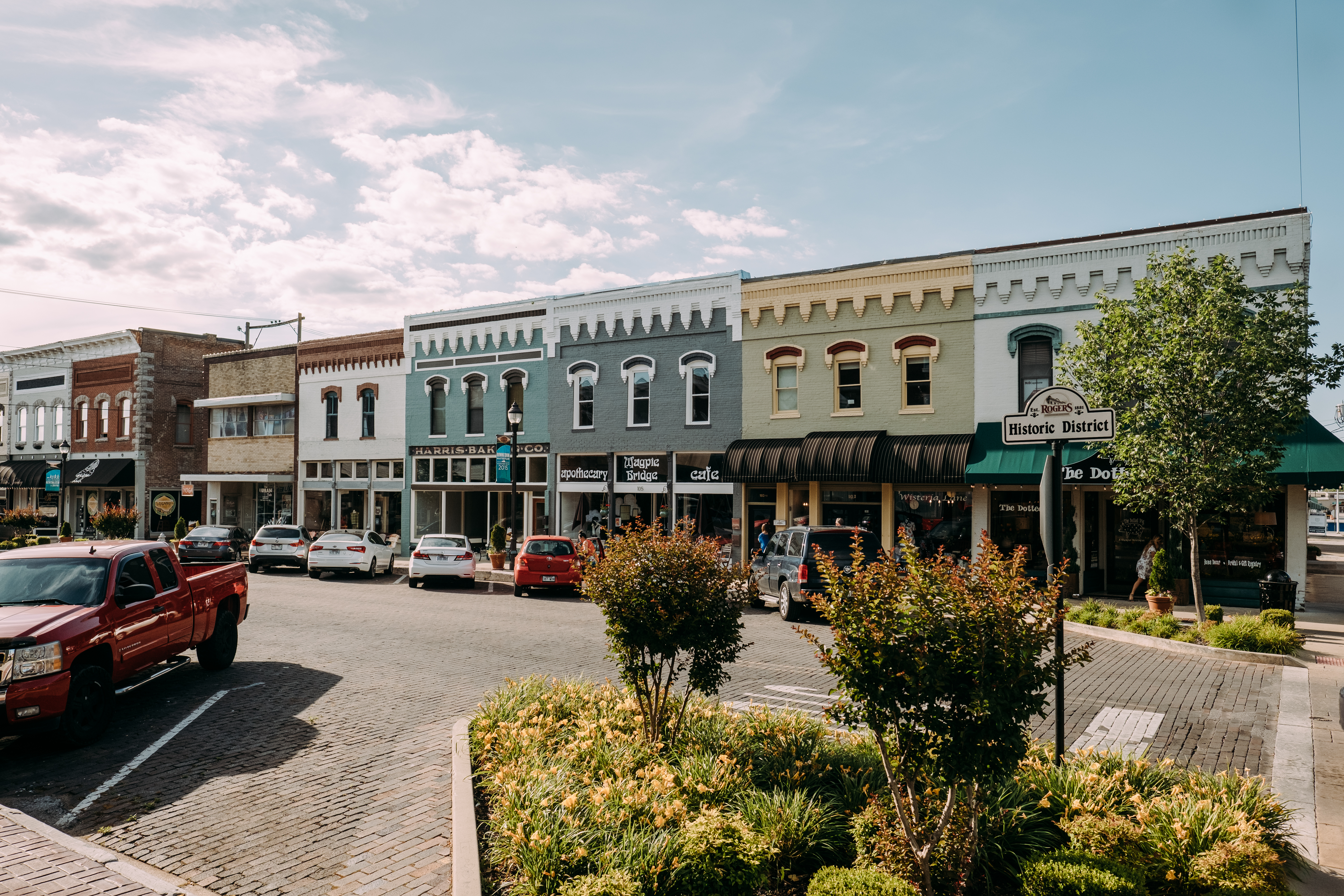
The sixth most populous municipality in Arkansas is Rogers.

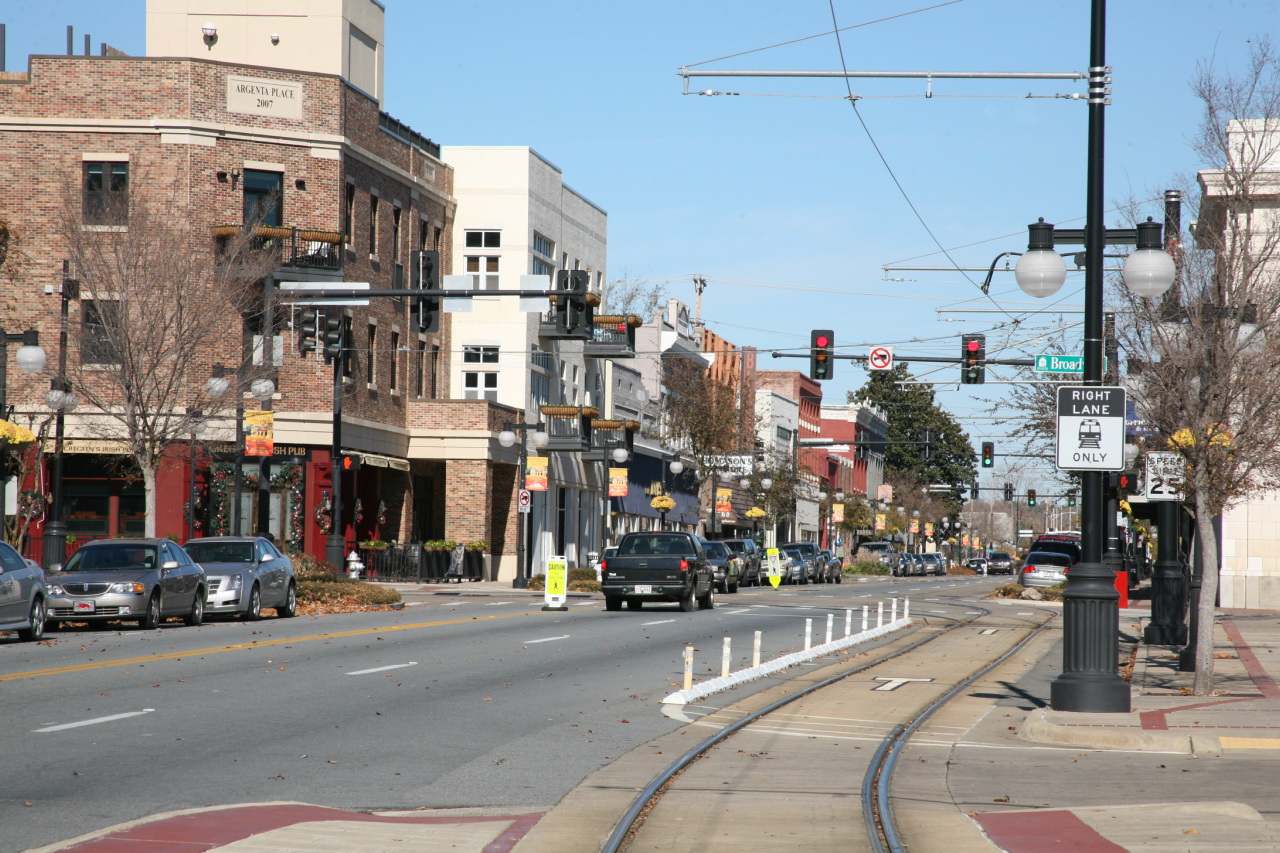
North Little Rock is part of the Little Rock metropolitan area and is the seventh largest municipality in Arkansas by population.

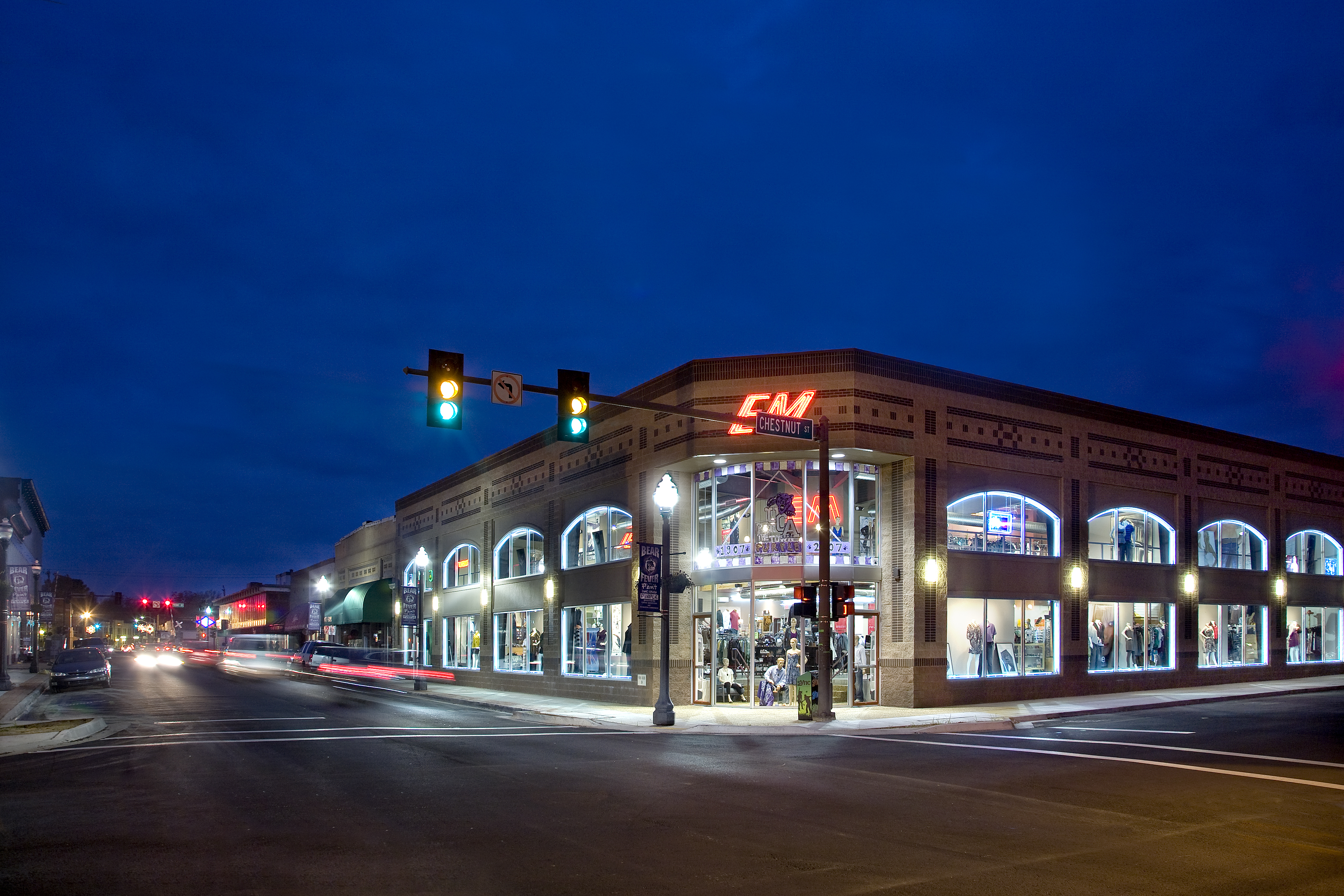
Conway is Arkansas's eighth largest municipality by population.

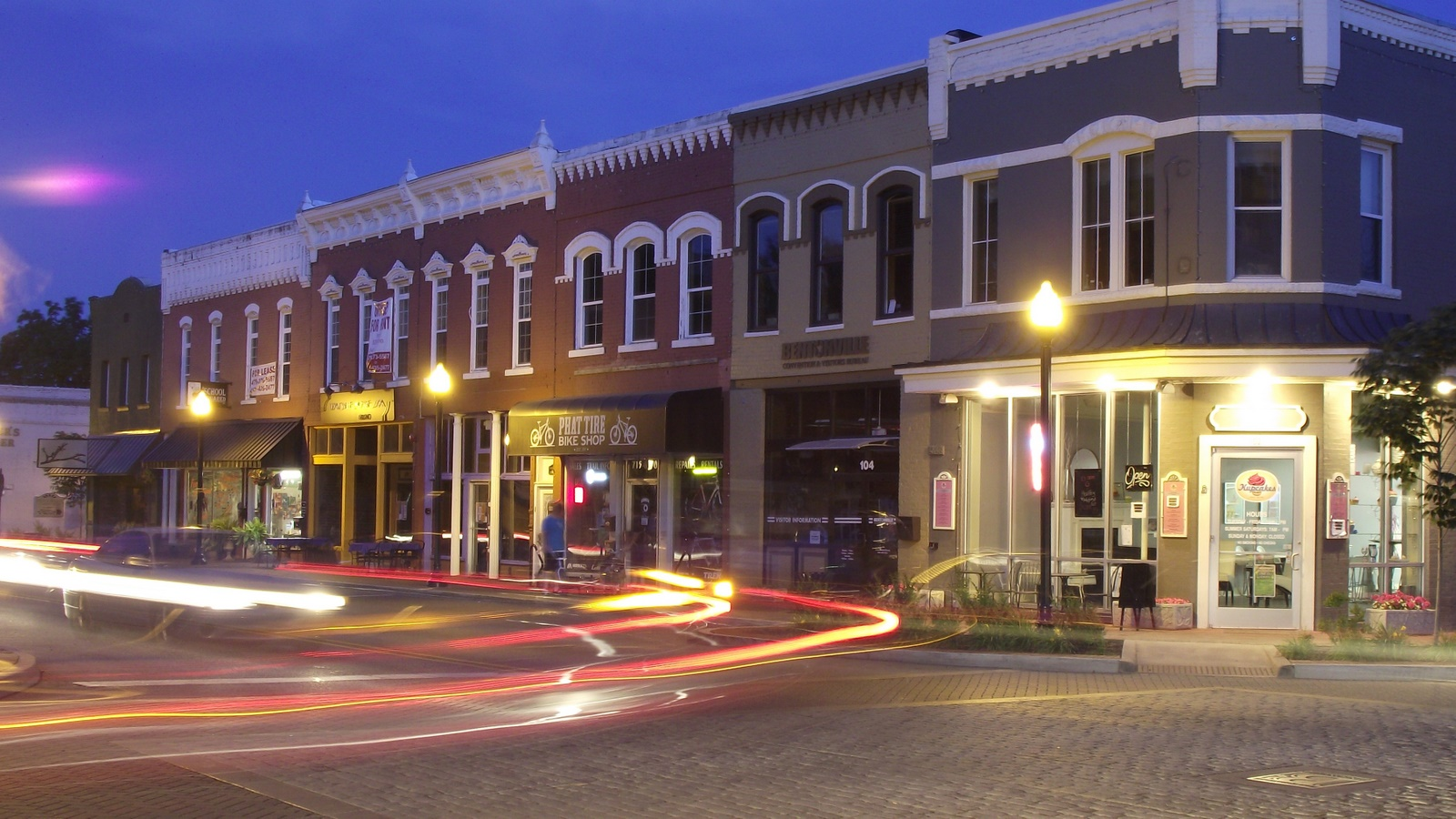
Arkansas' ninth largest municipality by population is Bentonville.

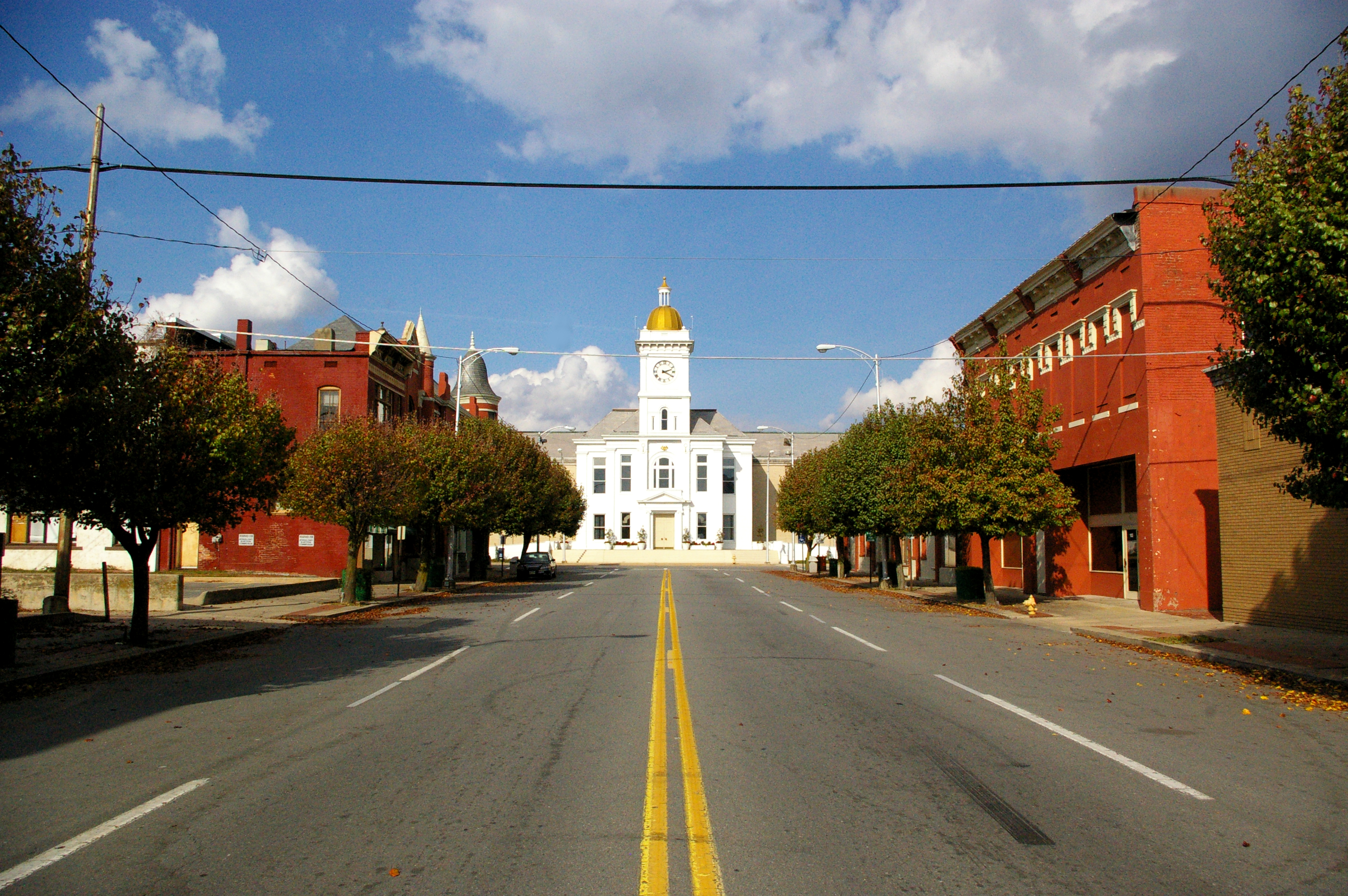
Pine Bluff is the tenth largest municipality by population in Arkansas.

Symbols indicating county seats and the state capital
†	County seat (Note: Some counties possess two county seats. This is due to past difficulties in travelling.)
‡	State capital and county seat

List of municipalities in Arkansas
Name	Type	County(ies)	Population (2020)	Population (2010)	Change	Land area (2020)		Population density	Incorporated
Name	Type	County(ies)	Population (2020)	Population (2010)	Change	sq mi	km^{2}	Population density	Incorporated
Adona	City (second class)	Perry	149	209	−28.7%	0.949	2.46	157.0/sq mi (60.6/km^{2})	July 1903
Alexander	City (first class)	Pulaski; Saline	3,385	2,901	+16.7%	2.256	5.84	1,500.4/sq mi (579.3/km^{2})	December 2, 1887
Alicia	Town	Lawrence	143	124	+15.3%	0.432	1.12	331.0/sq mi (127.8/km^{2})	August 7, 1889
Allport	Town	Lonoke	86	115	−25.2%	0.208	0.54	413.5/sq mi (159.6/km^{2})	April 10, 1967
Alma	City (first class)	Crawford	5,825	5,419	+7.5%	5.732	14.85	1,016.2/sq mi (392.4/km^{2})	January 7, 1874
Almyra	Town	Arkansas	256	283	−9.5%	0.388	1.00	659.8/sq mi (254.7/km^{2})	July 5, 1904
Alpena	Town	Boone; Carroll	374	392	−4.6%	1.333	3.45	280.6/sq mi (108.3/km^{2})	May 31, 1913
Altheimer	City (second class)	Jefferson	696	984	−29.3%	2.050	5.31	339.5/sq mi (131.1/km^{2})	June 9, 1919
Altus	City (second class)	Franklin	665	758	−12.3%	1.892	4.90	351.5/sq mi (135.7/km^{2})	August 31, 1888
Amagon	Town	Jackson	69	98	−29.6%	0.111	0.29	621.6/sq mi (240.0/km^{2})	June 2, 1948
Amity	City (second class)	Clark	681	723	−5.8%	3.210	8.31	212.1/sq mi (81.9/km^{2})	August 28, 1907
Anthonyville	Town	Crittenden	135	161	−16.1%	0.077	0.20	1,753.2/sq mi (676.9/km^{2})	December 15, 1999
Antoine	Town	Pike	113	117	−3.4%	0.506	1.31	223.3/sq mi (86.2/km^{2})	October 26, 1897
Arkadelphia†	City (first class)	Clark	10,380	10,714	−3.1%	7.545	19.54	1,375.7/sq mi (531.2/km^{2})	January 6, 1857
Arkansas City†	City (second class)	Desha	376	366	+2.7%	0.492	1.27	764.2/sq mi (295.1/km^{2})	September 12, 1873
Ash Flat†	City (second class)	Sharp; Fulton	1,137	1,082	+5.1%	6.315	16.36	180.0/sq mi (69.5/km^{2})	May 8, 1931
Ashdown†	City (first class)	Little River	4,261	4,723	−9.8%	7.137	18.48	597.0/sq mi (230.5/km^{2})	June 11, 1892
Atkins	City (first class)	Pope	2,859	3,016	−5.2%	6.130	15.88	466.4/sq mi (180.1/km^{2})	November 3, 1876
Aubrey	Town	Lee	108	170	−36.5%	0.332	0.86	325.3/sq mi (125.6/km^{2})	June 30, 1966
Augusta†	City (second class)	Woodruff	1,998	2,199	−9.1%	2.072	5.37	964.3/sq mi (372.3/km^{2})	July 9, 1860
Austin	City (second class)	Lonoke	3,460	2,038	+69.8%	3.096	8.02	1,117.6/sq mi (431.5/km^{2})	October 22, 1895
Avoca	Town	Benton	487	488	−0.2%	1.875	4.86	259.7/sq mi (100.3/km^{2})	March 16, 1966
Bald Knob	City (first class)	White	2,522	2,897	−12.9%	4.955	12.83	509.0/sq mi (196.5/km^{2})	September 16, 1881
Banks	Town	Bradley	87	124	−29.8%	0.376	0.97	231.4/sq mi (89.3/km^{2})	August 31, 1907
Barling	City (first class)	Sebastian	4,782	4,649	+2.9%	10.269	26.60	465.7/sq mi (179.8/km^{2})	June 8, 1956
Bassett	Town	Mississippi	124	173	−28.3%	0.245	0.63	506.1/sq mi (195.4/km^{2})	November 26, 1965
Batesville†	City (first class)	Independence	11,191	10,248	+9.2%	11.595	30.03	965.2/sq mi (372.6/km^{2})	December 20, 1848
Bauxite	Town	Saline	629	487	+29.2%	3.045	7.89	206.6/sq mi (79.8/km^{2})	January 16, 1973
Bay	City (second class)	Craighead	1,876	1,801	+4.2%	3.088	8.00	607.5/sq mi (234.6/km^{2})	March 1, 1913
Bearden	City (second class)	Ouachita	776	966	−19.7%	1.614	4.18	480.8/sq mi (185.6/km^{2})	January 23, 1892
Beaver	Town	Carroll	67	100	−33.0%	0.315	0.82	212.7/sq mi (82.1/km^{2})	September 6, 1949; November 28, 1980 (Note: Beaver lost its incorporation, but reincorporated on November 28, 1980.)
Beebe	City (first class)	White	8,437	7,315	+15.3%	10.144	26.27	831.7/sq mi (321.1/km^{2})	May 4, 1875
Beedeville	Town	Jackson	84	107	−21.5%	1.139	2.95	73.7/sq mi (28.5/km^{2})	November 7, 1963
Bella Vista	City (first class)	Benton	30,104	26,461	+13.8%	45.305	117.34	664.5/sq mi (256.6/km^{2})	December 7, 2006
Bellefonte	Town	Boone	411	454	−9.5%	0.622	1.61	660.8/sq mi (255.1/km^{2})	July 17, 1872
Belleville	City (second class)	Yell	312	441	−29.3%	1.867	4.84	167.1/sq mi (64.5/km^{2})	April 25, 1899
Ben Lomond	Town	Sevier	140	145	−3.4%	3.917	10.14	35.7/sq mi (13.8/km^{2})	May 26, 1900
Benton†	City (first class)	Saline	35,014	30,681	+14.1%	22.884	59.27	1,530.1/sq mi (590.8/km^{2})	March 15, 1836
Bentonville†	City (first class)	Benton	54,164	35,301	+53.4%	33.843	87.65	1,600.4/sq mi (617.9/km^{2})	April 3, 1873
Bergman	Town	Boone	426	439	−3.0%	1.305	3.38	326.4/sq mi (126.0/km^{2})	April 3, 1968
Berryville†	City (first class)	Carroll	5,682	5,356	+6.1%	6.150	15.93	923.9/sq mi (356.7/km^{2})	March 23, 1876
Bethel Heights	City (second class)	Benton	3,015	2,372	+27.1%	2.101	5.44	1,435.0/sq mi (554.1/km^{2})	August 9, 1967
Big Flat	Town	Baxter	88	105	−16.2%	1.067	2.76	82.5/sq mi (31.8/km^{2})	May 1, 1939
Bigelow	Town	Perry	352	315	+11.7%	0.956	2.48	368.2/sq mi (142.2/km^{2})	July 15, 1905
Biggers	Town	Randolph	305	347	−12.1%	1.002	2.60	304.4/sq mi (117.5/km^{2})	February 18, 1903
Birdsong	Town	Mississippi	32	41	−22.0%	0.202	0.52	158.4/sq mi (61.2/km^{2})	May 31, 1984
Black Oak	Town	Craighead	233	262	−11.1%	0.418	1.08	557.4/sq mi (215.2/km^{2})	December 24, 1923
Black Rock	City (second class)	Lawrence	590	662	−10.9%	3.286	8.51	179.5/sq mi (69.3/km^{2})	October 23, 1884
Black Springs	Town	Montgomery	96	99	−3.0%	0.445	1.15	215.7/sq mi (83.3/km^{2})	October 26, 1936
Blevins	City (second class)	Hempstead	288	315	−8.6%	0.994	2.57	289.7/sq mi (111.9/km^{2})	September 10, 1914
Blue Eye	Town	Carroll	46	30	+53.3%	0.075	0.19	613.3/sq mi (236.8/km^{2})	March 4, 1932
Blue Mountain	Town	Logan	88	124	−29.0%	1.065	2.76	82.6/sq mi (31.9/km^{2})	March 7, 1901
Bluff City	Town	Nevada	118	124	−4.8%	2.322	6.01	50.8/sq mi (19.6/km^{2})	August 29, 1966
Blytheville†	City (first class)	Mississippi	13,406	15,620	−14.2%	20.738	53.71	646.4/sq mi (249.6/km^{2})	January 4, 1892 (Note: Sources give conflicting dates for Blytheville's incorporation: May 1891, January 1892, and May 1889.)
Bodcaw	Town	Nevada	121	138	−12.3%	3.003	7.78	40.3/sq mi (15.6/km^{2})	May 23, 1969
Bonanza	City (second class)	Sebastian	587	575	+2.1%	2.787	7.22	210.6/sq mi (81.3/km^{2})	November 26, 1898
Bono	City (second class)	Craighead	2,409	2,131	+13.0%	2.664	6.90	904.3/sq mi (349.1/km^{2})	July 14, 1916
Booneville†	City (first class)	Logan	3,809	3,990	−4.5%	3.944	10.21	965.8/sq mi (372.9/km^{2})	June 6, 1878
Bradford	City (second class)	White	678	759	−10.7%	0.867	2.25	782.0/sq mi (301.9/km^{2})	September 19, 1893
Bradley	City (second class)	Lafayette	405	628	−35.5%	0.913	2.36	443.6/sq mi (171.3/km^{2})	April 3, 1937
Branch	City (second class)	Franklin	296	367	−19.3%	3.123	8.09	94.8/sq mi (36.6/km^{2})	July 3, 1909
Briarcliff	City (second class)	Baxter	236	236	0.0%	2.251	5.83	104.8/sq mi (40.5/km^{2})	June 10, 1997
Brinkley	City (first class)	Monroe	2,700	3,188	−15.3%	5.686	14.73	474.9/sq mi (183.3/km^{2})	August 31, 1872
Brookland	City (second class)	Craighead	4,064	1,642	+147.5%	7.799	20.20	521.1/sq mi (201.2/km^{2})	April 7, 1911
Bryant	City (first class)	Saline	20,663	16,688	+23.8%	20.494	53.08	1,008.2/sq mi (389.3/km^{2})	October 29, 1892; 1946
Buckner	City (second class)	Lafayette	165	275	−40.0%	1.176	3.05	140.3/sq mi (54.2/km^{2})	May 11, 1885
Bull Shoals	City (second class)	Marion	1,952	1,950	+0.1%	4.902	12.70	398.2/sq mi (153.7/km^{2})	November 13, 1953
Burdette	Town	Mississippi	140	191	−26.7%	0.737	1.91	190.0/sq mi (73.3/km^{2})	May 10, 1905
Cabot	City (first class)	Lonoke	26,569	23,776	+11.7%	20.666	53.52	1,285.6/sq mi (496.4/km^{2})	November 9, 1891
Caddo Valley	City (second class)	Clark	595	635	−6.3%	3.098	8.02	192.1/sq mi (74.2/km^{2})	September 11, 1974
Caldwell	Town	St. Francis	451	555	−18.7%	3.186	8.25	141.6/sq mi (54.7/km^{2})	April 3, 1964
Cale	Town	Nevada	73	79	−7.6%	0.966	2.50	75.6/sq mi (29.2/km^{2})	July 22, 1971
Calico Rock	City (second class)	Izard	888	1,545	−42.5%	4.756	12.32	186.7/sq mi (72.1/km^{2})	January 24, 1905
Calion	City (second class)	Union	429	494	−13.2%	1.072	2.78	400.2/sq mi (154.5/km^{2})	January 4, 1921
Camden†	City (first class)	Ouachita	10,612	12,183	−12.9%	16.526	42.80	642.1/sq mi (247.9/km^{2})	December 11, 1844
Cammack Village	City (second class)	Pulaski	778	768	+1.3%	0.283	0.73	2,749.1/sq mi (1,061.4/km^{2})	April 5, 1943
Campbell Station	City (second class)	Jackson	232	255	−9.0%	1.703	4.41	136.2/sq mi (52.6/km^{2})	April 17, 1953
Caraway	City (second class)	Craighead	1,133	1,279	−11.4%	2.304	5.97	491.8/sq mi (189.9/km^{2})	September 14, 1923
Carlisle	City (second class)	Lonoke	2,033	2,214	−8.2%	4.845	12.55	419.6/sq mi (162.0/km^{2})	August 28, 1878
Carthage	City (second class)	Dallas	222	343	−35.3%	0.989	2.56	224.5/sq mi (86.7/km^{2})	May 3, 1907
Casa	Town	Perry	120	171	−29.8%	1.091	2.83	110.0/sq mi (42.5/km^{2})	May 10, 1900
Cash	City (second class)	Craighead	280	342	−18.1%	0.367	0.95	762.9/sq mi (294.6/km^{2})	June 5, 1931
Caulksville	Town	Logan	154	213	−27.7%	1.348	3.49	114.2/sq mi (44.1/km^{2})	August 11, 1965
Cave City	City (second class)	Sharp; Independence	1,922	1,904	+0.9%	2.557	6.62	751.7/sq mi (290.2/km^{2})	April 29, 1907
Cave Springs	City (second class)	Benton	5,495	1,729	+217.8%	7.839	20.30	701.0/sq mi (270.7/km^{2})	March 15, 1910
Cedarville	City (second class)	Crawford	1,424	1,394	+2.2%	8.886	23.01	160.3/sq mi (61.9/km^{2})	July 5, 1881; August 25, 1998 (Note: In 1981 Cedarville was unincorporated due to a petition from a local citizen, but was reincorporated in 1998 from another petition from a group of local citizens.)
Centerton	City (first class)	Benton	17,792	9,515	+87.0%	13.578	35.17	1,310.4/sq mi (505.9/km^{2})	September 16, 1914
Central City	Town	Sebastian	461	502	−8.2%	2.224	5.76	207.3/sq mi (80.0/km^{2})	January 24, 1974
Charleston†	City (second class)	Franklin	2,588	2,494	+3.8%	3.834	9.93	675.0/sq mi (260.6/km^{2})	May 22, 1874
Cherokee Village	City (first class)	Sharp; Fulton	4,780	4,671	+2.3%	20.427	52.91	234.0/sq mi (90.3/km^{2})	January 31, 1997 (Note: The Fulton County portion of Cherokee Village was incorporated in January 1998 as Cherokee Village West; the portion in Sharp County joined in April 1998 and the unified city was renamed Cherokee Village.)
Cherry Valley	City (second class)	Cross	575	651	−11.7%	0.766	1.98	750.7/sq mi (289.8/km^{2})	August 6, 1910
Chester	Town	Crawford	144	159	−9.4%	0.510	1.32	282.4/sq mi (109.0/km^{2})	February 11, 1889
Chidester	City (second class)	Ouachita	253	287	−11.8%	5.314	13.76	47.6/sq mi (18.4/km^{2})	February 14, 1906
Clarendon†	City (second class)	Monroe	1,526	1,664	−8.3%	1.830	4.74	833.9/sq mi (322.0/km^{2})	February 8, 1859; August 11, 1898 (Note: Clarendon's original charter from 1859 was dissolved in 1884, but was reincorporated in 1898.)
Clarkedale	City (second class)	Crittenden	336	371	−9.4%	11.436	29.62	29.4/sq mi (11.3/km^{2})	January 12, 2001
Clarksville†	City (first class)	Johnson	9,381	9,178	+2.2%	18.530	47.99	506.3/sq mi (195.5/km^{2})	December 21, 1848
Clinton†	City (first class)	Van Buren	2,509	2,602	−3.6%	13.454	34.85	186.5/sq mi (72.0/km^{2})	January 9, 1851; August 15, 1879 (Note: Local records of Clinton's 1851 incorporation were lost, and the community reincorporated on August 15, 1879.)
Coal Hill	City (second class)	Johnson	820	1,012	−19.0%	2.931	7.59	279.8/sq mi (108.0/km^{2})	January 22, 1880
Colt	City (second class)	St. Francis	293	378	−22.5%	1.258	3.26	232.9/sq mi (89.9/km^{2})	April 17, 1916
Concord	Town	Cleburne	190	244	−22.1%	3.080	7.98	61.7/sq mi (23.8/km^{2})	June 27, 1968
Conway†	City (first class)	Faulkner	64,134	58,908	+8.9%	46.110	119.42	1,390.9/sq mi (537.0/km^{2})	October 16, 1875
Corinth	Town	Yell	45	70	−35.7%	3.090	8.00	14.6/sq mi (5.6/km^{2})	(Note: The incorporation date for Corinth is unknown.)
Corning†	City (first class)	Clay	3,227	3,377	−4.4%	3.671	9.51	879.1/sq mi (339.4/km^{2})	August 6, 1877
Cotter	City (second class)	Baxter	886	970	−8.7%	2.447	6.34	362.1/sq mi (139.8/km^{2})	July 13, 1904
Cotton Plant	City (second class)	Woodruff	529	649	−18.5%	1.039	2.69	509.1/sq mi (196.6/km^{2})	November 14, 1887
Cove	Town	Polk	319	382	−16.5%	1.598	4.14	199.6/sq mi (77.1/km^{2})	July 6, 1926
Coy	Town	Lonoke	87	96	−9.4%	0.672	1.74	129.5/sq mi (50.0/km^{2})	April 15, 1902
Crawfordsville	Town	Crittenden	462	479	−3.5%	0.559	1.45	826.5/sq mi (319.1/km^{2})	January 26, 1912
Crossett	City (first class)	Ashley	4,822	5,507	−12.4%	5.792	15.00	832.5/sq mi (321.4/km^{2})	April 22, 1903
Cushman	City (second class)	Independence	433	452	−4.2%	4.076	10.56	106.2/sq mi (41.0/km^{2})	March 12, 1906
Daisy	Town	Pike	88	115	−23.5%	1.141	2.96	77.1/sq mi (29.8/km^{2})	March 5, 1910
Damascus	Town	Van Buren; Faulkner	382	382	0.0%	1.862	4.82	205.2/sq mi (79.2/km^{2})	July 15, 1966
Danville†	City (second class)	Yell	2,028	2,409	−15.8%	4.280	11.09	473.8/sq mi (182.9/km^{2})	February 18, 1899
Dardanelle†	City (first class)	Yell	4,517	4,745	−4.8%	3.644	9.44	1,239.6/sq mi (478.6/km^{2})	January 17, 1855
Datto	Town	Clay	65	100	−35.0%	0.621	1.61	104.7/sq mi (40.4/km^{2})	June 22, 1905
De Queen†	City (first class)	Sevier	6,105	6,594	−7.4%	6.002	15.55	1,017.2/sq mi (392.7/km^{2})	July 9, 1897
De Valls Bluff†	City (first class)	Prairie	520	619	−16.0%	1.092	2.83	476.2/sq mi (183.9/km^{2})	April 4, 1866
Decatur	City (second class)	Benton	1,773	1,699	+4.4%	4.471	11.58	396.6/sq mi (153.1/km^{2})	May 25, 1908
Delaplaine	Town	Greene	64	116	−44.8%	1.106	2.86	57.9/sq mi (22.3/km^{2})	May 8, 1912
Delight	City (second class)	Pike	288	279	+3.2%	0.551	1.43	522.7/sq mi (201.8/km^{2})	September 15, 1904
Dell	Town	Mississippi	194	223	−13.0%	0.921	2.39	210.6/sq mi (81.3/km^{2})	August 12, 1905
Denning	Town	Franklin	200	314	−36.3%	1.077	2.79	185.7/sq mi (71.7/km^{2})	December 2, 1903
Dermott	City (second class)	Chicot	2,021	2,316	−12.7%	3.421	8.86	590.8/sq mi (228.1/km^{2})	August 20, 1890
Des Arc†	City (second class)	Prairie	1,905	1,717	+10.9%	2.102	5.44	906.3/sq mi (349.9/km^{2})	December 28, 1854
DeWitt†	City (first class)	Arkansas	3,056	3,292	−7.2%	2.992	7.75	1,021.4/sq mi (394.4/km^{2})	January 26, 1876
Diamond City	City (second class)	Boone	757	782	−3.2%	2.817	7.30	268.7/sq mi (103.8/km^{2})	June 7, 1960
Diaz	City (second class)	Jackson	1,224	1,318	−7.1%	5.971	15.46	205.0/sq mi (79.1/km^{2})	November 19, 1956
Dierks	City (second class)	Howard	916	1,133	−19.2%	1.919	4.97	477.3/sq mi (184.3/km^{2})	June 4, 1907
Donaldson	Town	Hot Spring	275	301	−8.6%	0.591	1.53	465.3/sq mi (179.7/km^{2})	August 31, 1956
Dover	City (second class)	Pope	1,337	1,378	−3.0%	2.827	7.32	472.9/sq mi (182.6/km^{2})	June 14, 1870
Dumas	City (first class)	Desha	4,001	4,706	−15.0%	2.906	7.53	1,376.8/sq mi (531.6/km^{2})	April 28, 1904
Dyer	City (second class)	Crawford	772	876	−11.9%	2.941	7.62	262.5/sq mi (101.4/km^{2})	July 22, 1889
Dyess	Town	Mississippi	339	410	−17.3%	0.961	2.49	352.8/sq mi (136.2/km^{2})	January 9, 1964
Earle	City (second class)	Crittenden	1,831	2,414	−24.2%	3.247	8.41	563.9/sq mi (217.7/km^{2})	March 25, 1905
East Camden	City (second class)	Ouachita	798	931	−14.3%	0.724	1.88	1,102.2/sq mi (425.6/km^{2})	September 8, 1965
Edmondson	Town	Crittenden	243	427	−43.1%	2.992	7.75	81.2/sq mi (31.4/km^{2})	August 22, 1911
Egypt	Town	Craighead	113	112	+0.9%	0.336	0.87	336.3/sq mi (129.8/km^{2})	May 24, 1984
El Dorado†	City (first class)	Union	17,756	18,884	−6.0%	16.201	41.96	1,096.0/sq mi (423.2/km^{2})	May 5, 1870
Elaine	City (second class)	Phillips	509	636	−20.0%	0.512	1.33	994.1/sq mi (383.8/km^{2})	April 23, 1919
Elkins	City (first class)	Washington	3,602	2,648	+36.0%	3.874	10.03	929.8/sq mi (359.0/km^{2})	February 19, 1964
Elm Springs	City (second class)	Washington; Benton	2,361	1,535	+53.8%	5.952	15.42	396.7/sq mi (153.2/km^{2})	May 23, 1917
Emerson	Town	Columbia	293	368	−20.4%	0.991	2.57	295.7/sq mi (114.2/km^{2})	March 10, 1905
Emmet	City (second class)	Nevada; Hempstead	415	518	−19.9%	1.442	3.73	287.8/sq mi (111.1/km^{2})	May 5, 1883
England	City (first class)	Lonoke	2,477	2,825	−12.3%	1.889	4.89	1,311.3/sq mi (506.3/km^{2})	March 1, 1897
Enola	Town	Faulkner	318	338	−5.9%	2.715	7.03	117.1/sq mi (45.2/km^{2})	July 9, 1969
Etowah	Town	Mississippi	254	351	−27.6%	5.939	15.38	42.8/sq mi (16.5/km^{2})	May 1, 1996
Eudora	City (second class)	Chicot	1,728	2,269	−23.8%	3.093	8.01	558.7/sq mi (215.7/km^{2})	February 8, 1904
Eureka Springs†	City (second class)	Carroll	2,166	2,073	+4.5%	6.758	17.50	320.5/sq mi (123.7/km^{2})	February 14, 1880
Evening Shade	City (second class)	Sharp	420	432	−2.8%	1.666	4.31	252.1/sq mi (97.3/km^{2})	April 26, 1870
Everton	Town	Boone	104	133	−21.8%	0.473	1.23	219.9/sq mi (84.9/km^{2})	April 12, 1913
Fairfield Bay	City (second class)	Van Buren; Cleburne	2,108	2,338	−9.8%	15.097	39.10	139.6/sq mi (53.9/km^{2})	July 29, 1993
Fargo	Town	Monroe	57	98	−41.8%	0.457	1.18	124.7/sq mi (48.2/km^{2})	January 6, 1987
Farmington	City (first class)	Washington	7,584	5,974	+27.0%	9.827	25.45	771.8/sq mi (298.0/km^{2})	October 15, 1946
Fayetteville†	City (first class)	Washington	93,949	73,580	+27.7%	54.137	140.21	1,735.4/sq mi (670.0/km^{2})	August 23, 1870
Felsenthal	Town	Union	85	150	−43.3%	1.476	3.82	57.6/sq mi (22.2/km^{2})	July 6, 1904
Fifty-Six	City (second class)	Stone	158	173	−8.7%	2.069	5.36	76.4/sq mi (29.5/km^{2})	March 3, 1971
Fisher	City (second class)	Poinsett	180	223	−19.3%	0.303	0.78	594.1/sq mi (229.4/km^{2})	December 2, 1907
Flippin	City (second class)	Marion	1,345	1,355	−0.7%	1.883	4.88	714.3/sq mi (275.8/km^{2})	October 8, 1921
Fordyce†	City (first class)	Dallas	3,396	4,300	−21.0%	6.814	17.65	498.4/sq mi (192.4/km^{2})	April 8, 1884
Foreman	City (second class)	Little River	977	1,011	−3.4%	1.977	5.12	494.2/sq mi (190.8/km^{2})	February 20, 1959
Forrest City†	City (first class)	St. Francis	13,015	15,371	−15.3%	20.245	52.43	642.9/sq mi (248.2/km^{2})	May 11, 1870
Fort Smith†	City (first class)	Sebastian	89,142	86,209	+3.4%	63.994	165.74	1,393.0/sq mi (537.8/km^{2})	December 24, 1842
Fouke	City (second class)	Miller	808	859	−5.9%	1.356	3.51	595.9/sq mi (230.1/km^{2})	May 5, 1911
Fountain Hill	Town	Ashley	108	175	−38.3%	0.568	1.47	190.1/sq mi (73.4/km^{2})	September 10, 1921
Fountain Lake	Town	Garland	475	503	−5.6%	4.249	11.00	111.8/sq mi (43.2/km^{2})	July 13, 1999
Fourche	Town	Perry	56	62	−9.7%	0.199	0.52	281.4/sq mi (108.7/km^{2})	December 2, 1906
Franklin	Town	Izard	191	198	−3.5%	2.133	5.52	89.5/sq mi (34.6/km^{2})	January 9, 1940
Fredonia (Biscoe)	Town	Prairie	305	363	−16.0%	0.955	2.47	319.4/sq mi (123.3/km^{2})	July 27, 1909
Friendship	Town	Hot Spring	158	176	−10.2%	0.712	1.84	221.9/sq mi (85.7/km^{2})	July 11, 1938
Fulton	Town	Hempstead	115	201	−42.8%	0.178	0.46	646.1/sq mi (249.4/km^{2})	October 7, 1879
Garfield	Town	Benton	593	502	+18.1%	3.091	8.01	191.8/sq mi (74.1/km^{2})	September 15, 1888
Garland	Town	Miller	195	242	−19.4%	0.877	2.27	222.3/sq mi (85.8/km^{2})	January 19, 1904
Garner	Town	White	211	284	−25.7%	0.789	2.04	267.4/sq mi (103.3/km^{2})	May 20, 1971
Gassville	City (second class)	Baxter	2,171	2,078	+4.5%	3.431	8.89	632.8/sq mi (244.3/km^{2})	January 20, 1903
Gateway	Town	Benton	436	405	+7.7%	6.559	16.99	66.5/sq mi (25.7/km^{2})	August 27, 1934
Gentry	City (first class)	Benton	3,790	3,158	+20.0%	5.174	13.40	732.5/sq mi (282.8/km^{2})	July 9, 1898
Georgetown	Town	White	81	124	−34.7%	0.289	0.75	280.3/sq mi (108.2/km^{2})	December 27, 1985
Gilbert	Town	Searcy	26	28	−7.1%	0.367	0.95	70.8/sq mi (27.4/km^{2})	February 13, 1913
Gillett	City (second class)	Arkansas	564	691	−18.4%	0.996	2.58	566.3/sq mi (218.6/km^{2})	December 21, 1906
Gillham	Town	Sevier	157	160	−1.9%	0.918	2.38	171.0/sq mi (66.0/km^{2})	October 1, 1902
Gilmore	City (second class)	Crittenden	176	188	−6.4%	13.516	35.01	13.0/sq mi (5.0/km^{2})	November 23, 1955
Glenwood	City (second class)	Pike	2,068	2,228	−7.2%	8.909	23.07	232.1/sq mi (89.6/km^{2})	May 6, 1909
Goshen	City (second class)	Washington	2,102	1,071	+96.3%	11.313	29.30	185.8/sq mi (71.7/km^{2})	October 11, 1982
Gosnell	City (first class)	Mississippi	2,910	3,548	−18.0%	1.669	4.32	1,743.6/sq mi (673.2/km^{2})	March 12, 1968
Gould	City (second class)	Lincoln	663	837	−20.8%	1.551	4.02	427.5/sq mi (165.0/km^{2})	August 24, 1907
Grady	City (second class)	Lincoln	305	449	−32.1%	1.855	4.80	164.4/sq mi (63.5/km^{2})	April 20, 1907
Grannis	City (second class)	Polk	496	554	−10.5%	7.930	20.54	62.5/sq mi (24.1/km^{2})	October 23, 1899
Gravette	City (second class)	Benton	3,547	2,325	+52.6%	15.278	39.57	232.2/sq mi (89.6/km^{2})	January 27, 1899
Green Forest	City (first class)	Carroll	2,972	2,761	+7.6%	2.465	6.38	1,205.7/sq mi (465.5/km^{2})	February 22, 1895
Greenbrier	City (first class)	Faulkner	5,707	4,706	+21.3%	7.935	20.55	719.2/sq mi (277.7/km^{2})	April 5, 1880
Greenland	City (second class)	Washington	1,213	1,259	−3.7%	4.013	10.39	302.3/sq mi (116.7/km^{2})	March 14, 1910
Greenway	City (second class)	Clay	174	209	−16.7%	0.260	0.67	669.2/sq mi (258.4/km^{2})	March 13, 1886
Greenwood†	City (first class)	Sebastian	9,516	8,952	+6.3%	10.824	28.03	879.2/sq mi (339.4/km^{2})	November 22, 1884
Greers Ferry	City (second class)	Cleburne	821	891	−7.9%	7.218	18.69	113.7/sq mi (43.9/km^{2})	July 31, 1968
Griffithville	Town	White	155	225	−31.1%	0.548	1.42	282.8/sq mi (109.2/km^{2})	June 1, 1905
Grubbs	City (second class)	Jackson	301	386	−22.0%	0.566	1.47	531.8/sq mi (205.3/km^{2})	January 15, 1909
Guion	Town	Izard	68	86	−20.9%	0.558	1.45	121.9/sq mi (47.1/km^{2})	July 19, 1907
Gum Springs	Town	Clark	91	120	−24.2%	0.391	1.01	232.7/sq mi (89.9/km^{2})	November 9, 1964
Gurdon	City (second class)	Clark	1,840	2,212	−16.8%	2.425	6.28	758.8/sq mi (293.0/km^{2})	November 8, 1880
Guy	City (second class)	Faulkner	752	708	+6.2%	6.775	17.55	111.0/sq mi (42.9/km^{2})	September 28, 1966
Hackett	City (second class)	Sebastian	784	812	−3.4%	1.435	3.72	546.3/sq mi (210.9/km^{2})	September 19, 1885
Hamburg†	City (first class)	Ashley	2,536	2,857	−11.2%	3.435	8.90	738.3/sq mi (285.1/km^{2})	December 14, 1854
Hampton†	City (second class)	Calhoun	1,181	1,324	−10.8%	3.278	8.49	360.3/sq mi (139.1/km^{2})	January 27, 1853
Hardy	City (second class)	Sharp	743	772	−3.8%	5.056	13.09	147.0/sq mi (56.7/km^{2})	July 12, 1894
Harrell	Town	Calhoun	210	254	−17.3%	0.552	1.43	380.4/sq mi (146.9/km^{2})	December 3, 1934
Harrisburg†	City (second class)	Poinsett	2,212	2,288	−3.3%	2.426	6.28	911.8/sq mi (352.0/km^{2})	February 24, 1883
Harrison†	City (first class)	Boone	13,069	12,943	+1.0%	11.205	29.02	1,166.4/sq mi (450.3/km^{2})	March 1, 1876
Hartford	City (second class)	Sebastian	499	642	−22.3%	1.884	4.88	264.9/sq mi (102.3/km^{2})	March 5, 1900
Hartman	City (second class)	Johnson	516	519	−0.6%	1.580	4.09	326.6/sq mi (126.1/km^{2})	October 13, 1911
Haskell	City (first class)	Saline	3,956	3,990	−0.9%	4.918	12.74	804.4/sq mi (310.6/km^{2})	July 21, 1910
Hatfield	Town	Polk	345	413	−16.5%	1.334	3.46	258.6/sq mi (99.9/km^{2})	March 18, 1901
Havana	City (second class)	Yell	239	375	−36.3%	0.601	1.56	397.7/sq mi (153.5/km^{2})	April 19, 1900
Haynes	Town	Lee	122	150	−18.7%	0.349	0.90	349.6/sq mi (135.0/km^{2})	February 25, 1889
Hazen	City (second class)	Prairie	1,481	1,468	+0.9%	3.518	9.11	421.0/sq mi (162.5/km^{2})	July 8, 1884
Heber Springs†	City (first class)	Cleburne	6,969	7,165	−2.7%	9.094	23.55	766.3/sq mi (295.9/km^{2})	October 12, 1882
Hector	Town	Pope	411	450	−8.7%	2.286	5.92	179.8/sq mi (69.4/km^{2})	(Note: The incorporation date for Hector is unknown.)
Helena-West Helena†	City (first class)	Phillips	9,519	12,282	−22.5%	13.094	33.91	727.0/sq mi (280.7/km^{2})	November 16, 1833; May 23, 1917 (Note: Helena and West Helena merged on January 1, 2006.)
Hermitage	City (second class)	Bradley	525	830	−36.7%	1.067	2.76	492.0/sq mi (190.0/km^{2})	August 30, 1907
Hickory Ridge	City (second class)	Cross	228	272	−16.2%	0.648	1.68	351.9/sq mi (135.9/km^{2})	November 7, 1949
Higden	Town	Cleburne	114	120	−5.0%	0.485	1.26	235.1/sq mi (90.8/km^{2})	November 27, 1909
Higginson	City (second class)	White	705	621	+13.5%	1.270	3.29	555.1/sq mi (214.3/km^{2})	May 16, 1906
Highfill	Town	Benton	1,587	583	+172.2%	18.022	46.68	88.1/sq mi (34.0/km^{2})	July 17, 1958
Highland	City (second class)	Sharp	982	1,045	−6.0%	8.740	22.64	112.4/sq mi (43.4/km^{2})	September 28, 1998
Hindsville	Town	Madison	90	61	+47.5%	0.372	0.96	241.9/sq mi (93.4/km^{2})	January 9, 1964
Holland	City (second class)	Faulkner	586	557	+5.2%	6.731	17.43	87.1/sq mi (33.6/km^{2})	November 18, 1998
Holly Grove	City (second class)	Monroe	460	602	−23.6%	1.001	2.59	459.5/sq mi (177.4/km^{2})	August 2, 1876
Hope†	City (first class)	Hempstead	8,952	10,095	−11.3%	10.683	27.67	838.0/sq mi (323.5/km^{2})	April 8, 1875
Horatio	City (second class)	Sevier	920	1,044	−11.9%	1.784	4.62	515.7/sq mi (199.1/km^{2})	October 11, 1898
Horseshoe Bend	City (second class)	Izard; Fulton; Sharp	2,440	2,184	+11.7%	13.361	34.60	182.6/sq mi (70.5/km^{2})	October 2, 1969
Horseshoe Lake	Town	Crittenden	264	292	−9.6%	0.153	0.40	1,725.5/sq mi (666.2/km^{2})	September 19, 1983
Hot Springs†	City (first class)	Garland	37,930	35,193	+7.8%	37.473	97.05	1,012.2/sq mi (390.8/km^{2})	January 10, 1851
Houston	Town	Perry	143	173	−17.3%	1.012	2.62	141.3/sq mi (54.6/km^{2})	June 21, 1902
Hoxie	City (first class)	Lawrence	2,598	2,780	−6.5%	6.666	17.26	389.7/sq mi (150.5/km^{2})	February 15, 1888
Hughes	City (second class)	St. Francis	1,056	1,441	−26.7%	2.263	5.86	466.6/sq mi (180.2/km^{2})	June 12, 1916
Humnoke	City (second class)	Lonoke	219	284	−22.9%	0.314	0.81	697.5/sq mi (269.3/km^{2})	September 22, 1942
Humphrey	City (second class)	Arkansas; Jefferson	463	557	−16.9%	1.306	3.38	354.5/sq mi (136.9/km^{2})	April 19, 1905
Hunter	Town	Woodruff	103	105	−1.9%	0.618	1.60	166.7/sq mi (64.4/km^{2})	August 25, 1906
Huntington	City (second class)	Sebastian	490	635	−22.8%	0.674	1.75	727.0/sq mi (280.7/km^{2})	February 4, 1888
Huntsville†	City (second class)	Madison	2,879	2,346	+22.7%	5.382	13.94	534.9/sq mi (206.5/km^{2})	July 16, 1925
Huttig	City (second class)	Union	448	597	−25.0%	2.979	7.72	150.4/sq mi (58.1/km^{2})	May 16, 1904
Imboden	City (second class)	Lawrence	640	677	−5.5%	1.273	3.30	502.7/sq mi (194.1/km^{2})	April 22, 1889
Jacksonport	Town	Jackson	150	212	−29.2%	0.376	0.97	398.9/sq mi (154.0/km^{2})	December 17, 1852
Jacksonville	City (first class)	Pulaski	29,477	28,364	+3.9%	28.646	74.19	1,029.0/sq mi (397.3/km^{2})	September 6, 1941
Jasper†	City (second class)	Newton	547	466	+17.4%	0.954	2.47	573.4/sq mi (221.4/km^{2})	May 8, 1896
Jennette	Town	Crittenden	118	115	+2.6%	2.265	5.87	52.1/sq mi (20.1/km^{2})	November 20, 1987
Jericho	Town	Crittenden	98	119	−17.6%	0.307	0.80	319.2/sq mi (123.3/km^{2})	June 10, 1986
Johnson	City (first class)	Washington	3,609	3,354	+7.6%	3.613	9.36	998.9/sq mi (385.7/km^{2})	March 6, 1961
Joiner	City (second class)	Mississippi	498	576	−13.5%	0.615	1.59	809.8/sq mi (312.6/km^{2})	March 20, 1922
Jonesboro†	City (first class)	Craighead	78,576	67,263	+16.8%	80.178	207.66	980.0/sq mi (378.4/km^{2})	February 16, 1883
Judsonia	City (second class)	White	1,854	2,019	−8.2%	2.887	7.48	642.2/sq mi (248.0/km^{2})	May 13, 1872
Junction City	City (second class)	Union	503	581	−13.4%	1.136	2.94	442.8/sq mi (171.0/km^{2})	February 21, 1895
Keiser	City (second class)	Mississippi	751	759	−1.1%	0.371	0.96	2,024.3/sq mi (781.6/km^{2})	November 10, 1933
Kensett	City (second class)	White	1,400	1,648	−15.0%	1.866	4.83	750.3/sq mi (289.7/km^{2})	October 16, 1911
Keo	Town	Lonoke	207	256	−19.1%	4.923	12.75	42.0/sq mi (16.2/km^{2})	March 17, 1916
Kibler	City (second class)	Crawford	1,005	961	+4.6%	4.996	12.94	201.2/sq mi (77.7/km^{2})	December 6, 1963
Kingsland	City (second class)	Cleveland	347	447	−22.4%	1.122	2.91	309.3/sq mi (119.4/km^{2})	July 22, 1884
Knobel	City (second class)	Clay	147	287	−48.8%	0.421	1.09	349.2/sq mi (134.8/km^{2})	November 14, 1896
Knoxville	City (second class)	Johnson	660	731	−9.7%	3.184	8.25	207.3/sq mi (80.0/km^{2})	January 5, 1962
Lafe	Town	Greene	418	458	−8.7%	2.032	5.26	205.7/sq mi (79.4/km^{2})	May 21, 1974
LaGrange	Town	Lee	52	89	−41.6%	0.152	0.39	342.1/sq mi (132.1/km^{2})	July 24, 1984
Lake City†	City (second class)	Craighead	2,326	2,082	+11.7%	3.146	8.15	739.4/sq mi (285.5/km^{2})	February 27, 1898
Lake View	City (second class)	Phillips	327	443	−26.2%	5.003	12.96	65.4/sq mi (25.2/km^{2})	December 2, 1980
Lake Village†	City (first class)	Chicot	2,065	2,575	−19.8%	2.377	6.16	868.7/sq mi (335.4/km^{2})	February 7, 1898
Lakeview	City (second class)	Baxter	775	741	+4.6%	1.040	2.69	745.2/sq mi (287.7/km^{2})	November 16, 1973
Lamar	City (second class)	Johnson	1,719	1,605	+7.1%	4.616	11.96	372.4/sq mi (143.8/km^{2})	May 19, 1887
Lavaca	City (second class)	Sebastian	2,450	2,289	+7.0%	2.222	5.75	1,102.6/sq mi (425.7/km^{2})	August 18, 1919
Leachville	City (second class)	Mississippi	2,039	1,993	+2.3%	4.403	11.40	463.1/sq mi (178.8/km^{2})	February 2, 1916
Lead Hill	Town	Boone	274	271	+1.1%	0.578	1.50	474.0/sq mi (183.0/km^{2})	December 8, 1915
Leola	Town	Grant	460	501	−8.2%	0.854	2.21	538.6/sq mi (208.0/km^{2})	September 5, 1907
Lepanto	City (second class)	Poinsett	1,732	1,893	−8.5%	1.564	4.05	1,107.4/sq mi (427.6/km^{2})	February 25, 1909
Leslie	City (second class)	Searcy	375	441	−15.0%	0.758	1.96	494.7/sq mi (191.0/km^{2})	February 9, 1906
Letona	Town	White	240	255	−5.9%	0.389	1.01	617.0/sq mi (238.2/km^{2})	September 23, 1911
Lewisville†	City (second class)	Lafayette	915	1,280	−28.5%	2.148	5.56	426.0/sq mi (164.5/km^{2})	December 16, 1850
Lexa	Town	Phillips	207	286	−27.6%	0.410	1.06	504.9/sq mi (194.9/km^{2})	April 15, 1925
Lincoln	City (second class)	Washington	2,294	2,249	+2.0%	2.866	7.42	800.4/sq mi (309.0/km^{2})	November 23, 1907
Little Flock	City (first class)	Benton	3,055	2,585	+18.2%	7.510	19.45	406.8/sq mi (157.1/km^{2})	November 16, 1970
Little Rock‡	City (first class)	Pulaski	202,591	193,524	+4.7%	120.046	310.92	1,687.6/sq mi (651.6/km^{2})	November 7, 1831
Lockesburg	City (second class)	Sevier	594	739	−19.6%	3.484	9.02	170.5/sq mi (65.8/km^{2})	November 7, 1878
London	City (second class)	Pope	936	1,039	−9.9%	3.170	8.21	295.3/sq mi (114.0/km^{2})	March 2, 1882
Lonoke†	City (first class)	Lonoke	4,276	4,245	+0.7%	4.799	12.43	891.0/sq mi (344.0/km^{2})	January 22, 1872
Lonsdale	Town	Garland	103	94	+9.6%	0.404	1.05	255.0/sq mi (98.4/km^{2})	May 10, 1913
Louann	Town	Ouachita	153	164	−6.7%	0.238	0.62	642.9/sq mi (248.2/km^{2})	September 22, 1923
Lowell	City (first class)	Benton	9,839	7,327	+34.3%	9.614	24.90	1,023.4/sq mi (395.1/km^{2})	August 17, 1905
Luxora	City (second class)	Mississippi	942	1,178	−20.0%	0.851	2.20	1,106.9/sq mi (427.4/km^{2})	June 3, 1897
Lynn	Town	Lawrence	258	288	−10.4%	2.313	5.99	111.5/sq mi (43.1/km^{2})	August 6, 1963
Madison	City (second class)	St. Francis	759	769	−1.3%	2.484	6.43	305.6/sq mi (118.0/km^{2})	July 1, 1914
Magazine	City (second class)	Logan	740	847	−12.6%	1.816	4.70	407.5/sq mi (157.3/km^{2})	April 1, 1878
Magness	Town	Independence	220	202	+8.9%	0.614	1.59	358.3/sq mi (138.3/km^{2})	October 26, 1906
Magnolia†	City (first class)	Columbia	11,162	11,577	−3.6%	13.231	34.27	843.6/sq mi (325.7/km^{2})	January 6, 1855
Malvern†	City (first class)	Hot Spring	10,867	10,318	+5.3%	9.864	25.55	1,101.7/sq mi (425.4/km^{2})	July 22, 1876
Mammoth Spring	City (second class)	Fulton	929	977	−4.9%	1.292	3.35	719.0/sq mi (277.6/km^{2})	June 15, 1889
Manila	City (first class)	Mississippi	3,682	3,342	+10.2%	3.756	9.73	980.3/sq mi (378.5/km^{2})	July 3, 1901
Mansfield	City (second class)	Sebastian; Scott	1,053	1,139	−7.6%	2.312	5.99	455.4/sq mi (175.9/km^{2})	August 29, 1888
Marianna†	City (first class)	Lee	3,575	4,115	−13.1%	3.614	9.36	989.2/sq mi (381.9/km^{2})	February 7, 1878
Marie	Town	Mississippi	108	84	+28.6%	0.147	0.38	734.7/sq mi (283.7/km^{2})	June 14, 1968
Marion†	City (first class)	Crittenden	13,752	12,345	+11.4%	20.043	51.91	686.1/sq mi (264.9/km^{2})	April 19, 1851; 1868; March 5, 1896 (Note: Marion originally incorporated April 19, 1851, but the Civil War caused the dissolution of the municipality and it had to be reincorporated in 1868 and again on March 5, 1896.)
Marked Tree	City (first class)	Poinsett	2,286	2,566	−10.9%	5.772	14.95	396.0/sq mi (152.9/km^{2})	July 8, 1897
Marmaduke	City (second class)	Greene	1,212	1,111	+9.1%	1.398	3.62	867.0/sq mi (334.7/km^{2})	August 2, 1909
Marshall†	City (second class)	Searcy	1,329	1,355	−1.9%	4.073	10.55	326.3/sq mi (126.0/km^{2})	June 18, 1884
Marvell	City (second class)	Phillips	855	1,186	−27.9%	1.436	3.72	595.4/sq mi (229.9/km^{2})	October 19, 1876
Maumelle	City (first class)	Pulaski	19,251	17,163	+12.2%	12.069	31.26	1,595.1/sq mi (615.9/km^{2})	June 20, 1985
Mayflower	City (second class)	Faulkner	1,984	2,234	−11.2%	3.940	10.20	503.6/sq mi (194.4/km^{2})	March 6, 1928
Maynard	Town	Randolph	379	426	−11.0%	1.171	3.03	323.7/sq mi (125.0/km^{2})	October 17, 1895
McCaskill	Town	Hempstead	57	96	−40.6%	0.738	1.91	77.2/sq mi (29.8/km^{2})	September 20, 1920
McCrory	City (second class)	Woodruff	1,583	1,729	−8.4%	2.368	6.13	668.5/sq mi (258.1/km^{2})	March 24, 1890
McDougal	Town	Clay	134	186	−28.0%	0.371	0.96	361.2/sq mi (139.5/km^{2})	December 14, 1954
McGehee	City (first class)	Desha	3,849	4,219	−8.8%	6.656	17.24	578.3/sq mi (223.3/km^{2})	April 26, 1906
McNab	Town	Hempstead	30	68	−55.9%	0.343	0.89	87.5/sq mi (33.8/km^{2})	March 20, 1909
McNeil	City (second class)	Columbia	381	516	−26.2%	1.268	3.28	300.5/sq mi (116.0/km^{2})	February 12, 1884
McRae	City (second class)	White	616	682	−9.7%	0.673	1.74	915.3/sq mi (353.4/km^{2})	May 27, 1914
Melbourne†	City (second class)	Izard	1,830	1,848	−1.0%	6.977	18.07	262.3/sq mi (101.3/km^{2})	May 4, 1878
Mena†	City (first class)	Polk	5,589	5,737	−2.6%	6.889	17.84	811.3/sq mi (313.2/km^{2})	September 18, 1896
Menifee	Town	Conway	274	302	−9.3%	2.266	5.87	120.9/sq mi (46.7/km^{2})	March 17, 1966
Midland	Town	Sebastian	227	325	−30.2%	0.346	0.90	656.1/sq mi (253.3/km^{2})	May 14, 1904
Midway	Town	Hot Spring	377	389	−3.1%	3.521	9.12	107.1/sq mi (41.3/km^{2})	April 20, 2000
Mineral Springs	City (second class)	Howard	1,085	1,208	−10.2%	2.133	5.52	508.7/sq mi (196.4/km^{2})	June 4, 1879
Minturn	Town	Lawrence	87	109	−20.2%	0.569	1.47	152.9/sq mi (59.0/km^{2})	December 16, 1904
Mitchellville	City (second class)	Desha	293	360	−18.6%	0.120	0.31	2,441.7/sq mi (942.7/km^{2})	May 21, 1963
Monette	City (second class)	Craighead	1,506	1,501	+0.3%	5.657	14.65	266.2/sq mi (102.8/km^{2})	July 3, 1900
Monticello†	City (first class)	Drew	8,442	9,467	−10.8%	10.891	28.21	775.1/sq mi (299.3/km^{2})	December 20, 1852
Montrose	City (second class)	Ashley	243	354	−31.4%	0.379	0.98	641.2/sq mi (247.6/km^{2})	July 8, 1904
Moorefield	Town	Independence	126	137	−8.0%	1.131	2.93	111.4/sq mi (43.0/km^{2})	January 29, 1969
Moro	Town	Lee	177	216	−18.1%	0.965	2.50	183.4/sq mi (70.8/km^{2})	May 22, 1914
Morrilton†	City (first class)	Conway	6,992	6,767	+3.3%	8.828	22.86	792.0/sq mi (305.8/km^{2})	November 24, 1879
Morrison Bluff	Town	Logan	78	64	+21.9%	1.341	3.47	58.2/sq mi (22.5/km^{2})	January 16, 1912
Mount Ida†	City (second class)	Montgomery	996	1,076	−7.4%	1.569	4.06	634.8/sq mi (245.1/km^{2})	May 30, 1890
Mount Pleasant	Town	Izard	353	414	−14.7%	3.502	9.07	100.8/sq mi (38.9/km^{2})	November 1, 1963
Mount Vernon	Town	Faulkner	144	145	−0.7%	1.011	2.62	142.4/sq mi (55.0/km^{2})	July 1, 1878
Mountain Home†	City (first class)	Baxter	12,825	12,448	+3.0%	11.941	30.93	1,074.0/sq mi (414.7/km^{2})	April 16, 1888
Mountain Pine	City (second class)	Garland	585	770	−24.0%	1.661	4.30	352.2/sq mi (136.0/km^{2})	May 23, 1966
Mountain View†	City (first class)	Stone	2,877	2,748	+4.7%	7.296	18.90	394.3/sq mi (152.2/km^{2})	August 14, 1890
Mountainburg	City (second class)	Crawford	528	631	−16.3%	1.472	3.81	358.7/sq mi (138.5/km^{2})	August 3, 1882
Mulberry	City (second class)	Crawford	1,543	1,655	−6.8%	7.826	20.27	197.2/sq mi (76.1/km^{2})	November 8, 1880
Murfreesboro†	City (second class)	Pike	1,495	1,641	−8.9%	3.665	9.49	407.9/sq mi (157.5/km^{2})	April 19, 1878
Nashville†	City (first class)	Howard	4,153	4,627	−10.2%	5.471	14.17	759.1/sq mi (293.1/km^{2})	October 29, 1883
Newark	City (second class)	Independence	1,180	1,176	+0.3%	1.645	4.26	717.3/sq mi (277.0/km^{2})	April 12, 1889
Newport†	City (first class)	Jackson	8,005	7,879	+1.6%	13.551	35.10	590.7/sq mi (228.1/km^{2})	October 16, 1875
Nimmons	Town	Clay	69	69	0.0%	0.250	0.65	276.0/sq mi (106.6/km^{2})	January 16, 1912
Norfork	City (second class)	Baxter	465	511	−9.0%	2.225	5.76	209.0/sq mi (80.7/km^{2})	November 25, 1910
Norman	Town	Montgomery	303	378	−19.8%	1.125	2.91	269.3/sq mi (104.0/km^{2})	February 14, 1910
Norphlet	City (second class)	Union	766	844	−9.2%	2.044	5.29	374.8/sq mi (144.7/km^{2})	July 27, 1923
North Little Rock	City (first class)	Pulaski	64,591	62,304	+3.7%	52.335	135.55	1,234.2/sq mi (476.5/km^{2})	July 17, 1901
O'Kean	Town	Randolph	192	194	−1.0%	1.020	2.64	188.2/sq mi (72.7/km^{2})	November 29, 1913
Oak Grove	Town	Carroll	386	369	+4.6%	2.885	7.47	133.8/sq mi (51.7/km^{2})	September 12, 1938
Oak Grove Heights	City (second class)	Greene	1,104	889	+24.2%	2.995	7.76	368.6/sq mi (142.3/km^{2})	January 29, 1979
Oakhaven	Town	Hempstead	65	63	+3.2%	0.046	0.12	1,413.0/sq mi (545.6/km^{2})	October 4, 1947
Oden	Town	Montgomery	180	232	−22.4%	0.814	2.11	221.1/sq mi (85.4/km^{2})	February 14, 1929
Ogden	City (second class)	Little River	131	180	−27.2%	0.384	0.99	341.1/sq mi (131.7/km^{2})	April 10, 1920
Oil Trough	Town	Independence	226	260	−13.1%	0.229	0.59	986.9/sq mi (381.0/km^{2})	July 22, 1959
Okolona	Town	Clark	97	147	−34.0%	0.793	2.05	122.3/sq mi (47.2/km^{2})	November 15, 1902
Ola	City (second class)	Yell	934	1,281	−27.1%	1.701	4.41	549.1/sq mi (212.0/km^{2})	March 20, 1900
Omaha	Town	Boone	128	169	−24.3%	0.390	1.01	328.2/sq mi (126.7/km^{2})	February 1, 1936
Oppelo	City (second class)	Conway	737	781	−5.6%	2.430	6.29	303.3/sq mi (117.1/km^{2})	January 24, 1966
Osceola†	City (first class)	Mississippi	6,976	7,757	−10.1%	9.419	24.40	740.6/sq mi (286.0/km^{2})	January 12, 1853
Oxford	City (second class)	Izard	573	670	−14.5%	6.545	16.95	87.5/sq mi (33.8/km^{2})	November 16, 1945
Ozan	Town	Hempstead	50	85	−41.2%	0.327	0.85	152.9/sq mi (59.0/km^{2})	July 25, 1888
Ozark†	City (first class)	Franklin	3,542	3,684	−3.9%	7.931	20.54	446.6/sq mi (172.4/km^{2})	December 17, 1850
Palestine	City (second class)	St. Francis	506	681	−25.7%	3.305	8.56	153.1/sq mi (59.1/km^{2})	April 23, 1889
Pangburn	City (second class)	White	500	601	−16.8%	0.545	1.41	917.4/sq mi (354.2/km^{2})	April 8, 1911
Paragould†	City (first class)	Greene	29,537	26,113	+13.1%	31.857	82.51	927.2/sq mi (358.0/km^{2})	March 21, 1883
Paris†	City (first class)	Logan	3,176	3,532	−10.1%	4.568	11.83	695.3/sq mi (268.4/km^{2})	February 19, 1879
Parkdale	City (second class)	Ashley	172	277	−37.9%	1.020	2.64	168.6/sq mi (65.1/km^{2})	January 4, 1902
Parkin	City (second class)	Cross	794	1,105	−28.1%	2.558	6.63	310.4/sq mi (119.8/km^{2})	May 10, 1912
Patmos	Town	Hempstead	57	64	−10.9%	0.111	0.29	513.5/sq mi (198.3/km^{2})	September 27, 1906
Patterson	City (second class)	Woodruff	310	452	−31.4%	1.130	2.93	274.3/sq mi (105.9/km^{2})	(Note: The incorporation date for Patterson is unknown.)
Pea Ridge	City (first class)	Benton	6,559	4,794	+36.8%	7.337	19.00	894.0/sq mi (345.2/km^{2})	November 7, 1935
Peach Orchard	City (second class)	Clay	105	135	−22.2%	1.030	2.67	101.9/sq mi (39.4/km^{2})	July 3, 1910
Perla	Town	Hot Spring	257	241	+6.6%	0.963	2.49	266.9/sq mi (103.0/km^{2})	September 23, 1960
Perry	Town	Perry	262	270	−3.0%	0.702	1.82	373.2/sq mi (144.1/km^{2})	February 20, 1914
Perrytown	Town	Hempstead	232	272	−14.7%	1.394	3.61	166.4/sq mi (64.3/km^{2})	October 14, 1963
Perryville†	City (second class)	Perry	1,373	1,460	−6.0%	4.268	11.05	321.7/sq mi (124.2/km^{2})	December 18, 1878
Piggott†	City (first class)	Clay	3,622	3,849	−5.9%	5.363	13.89	675.4/sq mi (260.8/km^{2})	September 3, 1891
Pindall	Town	Searcy	95	112	−15.2%	2.871	7.44	33.1/sq mi (12.8/km^{2})	December 14, 1912
Pine Bluff†	City (first class)	Jefferson	41,253	49,083	−16.0%	44.182	114.43	933.7/sq mi (360.5/km^{2})	January 10, 1839
Pineville	Town	Izard	154	238	−35.3%	1.807	4.68	85.2/sq mi (32.9/km^{2})	October 11, 1973
Plainview	City (second class)	Yell	467	608	−23.2%	1.457	3.77	320.5/sq mi (123.8/km^{2})	August 28, 1907
Pleasant Plains	Town	Independence	352	349	+0.9%	1.023	2.65	344.1/sq mi (132.9/km^{2})	May 25, 1907
Plumerville	City (second class)	Conway	734	826	−11.1%	1.029	2.67	713.3/sq mi (275.4/km^{2})	November 25, 1880
Pocahontas†	City (first class)	Randolph	7,371	6,608	+11.5%	7.551	19.56	976.2/sq mi (376.9/km^{2})	January 15, 1857
Pollard	City (second class)	Clay	193	222	−13.1%	0.297	0.77	649.8/sq mi (250.9/km^{2})	October 15, 1921
Portia	Town	Lawrence	424	437	−3.0%	1.292	3.35	328.2/sq mi (126.7/km^{2})	May 19, 1886
Portland	City (second class)	Ashley	325	430	−24.4%	1.071	2.77	303.5/sq mi (117.2/km^{2})	October 18, 1893
Pottsville	City (first class)	Pope	3,140	2,838	+10.6%	13.532	35.05	232.0/sq mi (89.6/km^{2})	May 7, 1897
Powhatan	Town	Lawrence	104	72	+44.4%	0.547	1.42	190.1/sq mi (73.4/km^{2})	January 12, 1853
Poyen	Town	Grant	263	290	−9.3%	0.306	0.79	859.5/sq mi (331.8/km^{2})	September 10, 1954
Prairie Grove	City (first class)	Washington	7,045	4,380	+60.8%	9.281	24.04	759.1/sq mi (293.1/km^{2})	July 25, 1888
Prattsville	Town	Grant	289	305	−5.2%	1.617	4.19	178.7/sq mi (69.0/km^{2})	September 10, 1962
Prescott†	City (first class)	Nevada	3,101	3,296	−5.9%	6.455	16.72	480.4/sq mi (185.5/km^{2})	October 6, 1874
Pyatt	Town	Marion	181	221	−18.1%	1.256	3.25	144.1/sq mi (55.6/km^{2})	June 11, 1929
Quitman	City (second class)	Cleburne; Faulkner	694	762	−8.9%	1.895	4.91	366.2/sq mi (141.4/km^{2})	May 25, 1881
Ratcliff	City (second class)	Logan	167	202	−17.3%	1.814	4.70	92.1/sq mi (35.5/km^{2})	August 2, 1907
Ravenden	Town	Lawrence	426	470	−9.4%	2.111	5.47	201.8/sq mi (77.9/km^{2})	November 15, 1901
Ravenden Springs	Town	Randolph	119	118	+0.8%	1.165	3.02	102.1/sq mi (39.4/km^{2})	August 18, 1881
Rector	City (second class)	Clay	1,862	1,977	−5.8%	1.363	3.53	1,366.1/sq mi (527.5/km^{2})	September 13, 1887
Redfield	City (second class)	Jefferson	1,505	1,297	+16.0%	3.094	8.01	486.4/sq mi (187.8/km^{2})	October 18, 1898
Reed	Town	Desha	130	141	−7.8%	0.203	0.53	640.4/sq mi (247.3/km^{2})	August 3, 1961
Reyno	City (second class)	Randolph	391	456	−14.3%	1.010	2.62	387.1/sq mi (149.5/km^{2})	October 18, 1886
Rison†	City (second class)	Cleveland	967	1,344	−28.1%	3.275	8.48	295.3/sq mi (114.0/km^{2})	August 26, 1890
Rockport	City (second class)	Hot Spring	676	755	−10.5%	3.155	8.17	214.3/sq mi (82.7/km^{2})	January 2, 1851
Roe	Town	Monroe	68	114	−40.4%	0.179	0.46	379.9/sq mi (146.7/km^{2})	February 16, 1968
Rogers	City (first class)	Benton	69,908	55,964	+24.9%	38.894	100.73	1,797.4/sq mi (694.0/km^{2})	June 6, 1881
Rondo	Town	Lee	163	198	−17.7%	1.008	2.61	161.7/sq mi (62.4/km^{2})	June 19, 1918
Rose Bud	Town	White	494	482	+2.5%	6.039	15.64	81.8/sq mi (31.6/km^{2})	June 27, 1969
Rosston	Town	Nevada	272	261	+4.2%	4.421	11.45	61.5/sq mi (23.8/km^{2})	September 3, 1970
Rudy	Town	Crawford	130	61	+113.1%	1.587	4.11	81.9/sq mi (31.6/km^{2})	February 17, 1937
Russell	Town	White	184	216	−14.8%	0.208	0.54	884.6/sq mi (341.6/km^{2})	October 10, 1892
Russellville†	City (first class)	Pope	28,940	27,920	+3.7%	28.302	73.30	1,022.5/sq mi (394.8/km^{2})	June 7, 1870
Salem†	City (second class)	Fulton	1,566	1,635	−4.2%	2.412	6.25	649.3/sq mi (250.7/km^{2})	July 21, 1900; November 15, 1927 (Note: Salem originally incorporated July 21, 1900, but there was a period when the city did not have a governing body, and thus was reincorporated with an elected mayor and councilmen on November 15, 1927.)
Salesville	City (second class)	Baxter	473	450	+5.1%	4.515	11.69	104.8/sq mi (40.4/km^{2})	January 25, 1968
Scranton	City (second class)	Logan	245	224	+9.4%	0.506	1.31	484.2/sq mi (186.9/km^{2})	November 21, 1910
Searcy†	City (first class)	White	22,937	22,858	+0.3%	18.317	47.44	1,252.2/sq mi (483.5/km^{2})	August 6, 1851
Sedgwick	Town	Lawrence	163	152	+7.2%	0.519	1.34	314.1/sq mi (121.3/km^{2})	February 3, 1894
Shannon Hills	City (first class)	Saline	4,490	3,143	+42.9%	2.639	6.83	1,701.4/sq mi (656.9/km^{2})	August 25, 1977
Sheridan†	City (first class)	Grant	4,920	4,603	+6.9%	12.032	31.16	408.9/sq mi (157.9/km^{2})	August 26, 1887
Sherrill	Town	Jefferson	53	84	−36.9%	0.132	0.34	401.5/sq mi (155.0/km^{2})	May 25, 1935
Sherwood	City (first class)	Pulaski	32,731	29,523	+10.9%	20.744	53.73	1,577.9/sq mi (609.2/km^{2})	April 22, 1948
Shirley	Town	Van Buren	248	291	−14.8%	2.407	6.23	103.0/sq mi (39.8/km^{2})	November 18, 1911
Sidney	Town	Sharp	192	181	+6.1%	2.086	5.40	92.0/sq mi (35.5/km^{2})	May 11, 1935
Siloam Springs	City (first class)	Benton	17,287	15,039	+14.9%	11.504	29.80	1,502.7/sq mi (580.2/km^{2})	December 22, 1881
Smackover	City (second class)	Union	1,630	1,865	−12.6%	4.349	11.26	374.8/sq mi (144.7/km^{2})	November 3, 1922
Smithville	Town	Lawrence	87	78	+11.5%	0.666	1.72	130.6/sq mi (50.4/km^{2})	January 10, 1851
South Lead Hill	Town	Boone	86	102	−15.7%	0.164	0.42	524.4/sq mi (202.5/km^{2})	May 25, 1970
Southside	City (second class)	Independence	4,279	102	+4,095.1%	9.855	25.52	434.2/sq mi (167.6/km^{2})	October 24, 2014
Sparkman	City (second class)	Dallas	355	427	−16.9%	1.291	3.34	275.0/sq mi (106.2/km^{2})	January 15, 1915
Springdale	City (first class)	Washington; Benton	84,161	69,797	+20.6%	47.016	121.77	1,790.1/sq mi (691.1/km^{2})	April 1, 1878
Springtown	Town	Benton	83	87	−4.6%	0.541	1.40	153.4/sq mi (59.2/km^{2})	June 7, 1909
St. Charles	Town	Arkansas	207	230	−10.0%	0.887	2.30	233.4/sq mi (90.1/km^{2})	April 27, 1880
St. Francis	City (second class)	Clay	218	250	−12.8%	0.355	0.92	614.1/sq mi (237.1/km^{2})	August 4, 1888
St. Joe	Town	Searcy	129	132	−2.3%	1.242	3.22	103.9/sq mi (40.1/km^{2})	July 11, 1904
St. Paul	Town	Madison	111	113	−1.8%	0.454	1.18	244.5/sq mi (94.4/km^{2})	May 30, 1891
Stamps	City (second class)	Lafayette	1,258	1,693	−25.7%	3.052	7.90	412.2/sq mi (159.1/km^{2})	April 11, 1898
Star City†	City (second class)	Lincoln	2,173	2,274	−4.4%	4.797	12.42	453.0/sq mi (174.9/km^{2})	July 3, 1876
Stephens	City (second class)	Ouachita	770	891	−13.6%	2.756	7.14	279.4/sq mi (107.9/km^{2})	February 25, 1889
Strawberry	Town	Lawrence	268	302	−11.3%	2.343	6.07	114.4/sq mi (44.2/km^{2})	March 5, 1965
Strong	City (second class)	Union	410	558	−26.5%	1.597	4.14	256.7/sq mi (99.1/km^{2})	September 7, 1903
Stuttgart†	City (first class)	Arkansas	8,264	9,326	−11.4%	7.413	19.20	1,114.8/sq mi (430.4/km^{2})	April 19, 1889
Subiaco	Town	Logan	401	572	−29.9%	1.892	4.90	211.9/sq mi (81.8/km^{2})	June 3, 1912
Success	Town	Clay	98	149	−34.2%	0.223	0.58	439.5/sq mi (169.7/km^{2})	December 18, 1903
Sulphur Rock	Town	Independence	609	456	+33.6%	1.250	3.24	487.2/sq mi (188.1/km^{2})	August 20, 1887
Sulphur Springs	City (second class)	Benton	481	511	−5.9%	1.011	2.62	475.8/sq mi (183.7/km^{2})	August 26, 1890
Summit	City (second class)	Marion	544	604	−9.9%	1.206	3.12	451.1/sq mi (174.2/km^{2})	June 2, 1917
Sunset	Town	Crittenden	184	198	−7.1%	0.263	0.68	699.6/sq mi (270.1/km^{2})	February 4, 1970
Swifton	City (second class)	Jackson	733	798	−8.1%	0.549	1.42	1,335.2/sq mi (515.5/km^{2})	April 26, 1890
Taylor	City (second class)	Columbia	579	566	+2.3%	0.993	2.57	583.1/sq mi (225.1/km^{2})	May 10, 1913
Texarkana†	City (first class)	Miller	29,387	29,919	−1.8%	41.978	108.72	700.1/sq mi (270.3/km^{2})	August 10, 1880
Thornton	City (second class)	Calhoun	339	407	−16.7%	1.924	4.98	176.2/sq mi (68.0/km^{2})	December 13, 1890
Tillar	City (second class)	Drew; Desha	172	225	−23.6%	0.785	2.03	219.1/sq mi (84.6/km^{2})	September 11, 1907
Tinsman	Town	Calhoun	50	54	−7.4%	0.530	1.37	94.3/sq mi (36.4/km^{2})	October 11, 1909
Tollette	Town	Howard	185	240	−22.9%	0.963	2.49	192.1/sq mi (74.2/km^{2})	July 27, 1972
Tontitown	City (second class)	Washington	4,301	2,460	+74.8%	17.911	46.39	240.1/sq mi (92.7/km^{2})	November 10, 1909
Traskwood	City (second class)	Saline	495	518	−4.4%	5.630	14.58	87.9/sq mi (33.9/km^{2})	November 20, 1900
Trumann	City (first class)	Poinsett	7,399	7,243	+2.2%	5.802	15.03	1,275.2/sq mi (492.4/km^{2})	November 16, 1917
Tuckerman	City (second class)	Jackson	1,707	1,862	−8.3%	2.676	6.93	637.9/sq mi (246.3/km^{2})	November 18, 1891
Tull	Town	Grant	484	448	+8.0%	4.032	10.44	120.0/sq mi (46.3/km^{2})	September 2, 1966
Tupelo	Town	Jackson	70	180	−61.1%	0.278	0.72	251.8/sq mi (97.2/km^{2})	December 22, 1904
Turrell	City (second class)	Crittenden	517	615	−15.9%	5.346	13.85	96.7/sq mi (37.3/km^{2})	November 12, 1926
Twin Groves	Town	Faulkner	317	335	−5.4%	4.605	11.93	68.8/sq mi (26.6/km^{2})	December 20, 1991
Tyronza	City (second class)	Poinsett	716	762	−6.0%	1.555	4.03	460.5/sq mi (177.8/km^{2})	May 17, 1926
Ulm	Town	Prairie	175	170	+2.9%	0.261	0.68	670.5/sq mi (258.9/km^{2})	February 12, 1909
Valley Springs	Town	Boone	183	183	0.0%	0.514	1.33	356.0/sq mi (137.5/km^{2})	August 5, 1929
Van Buren†	City (first class)	Crawford	23,218	22,791	+1.9%	15.410	39.91	1,506.7/sq mi (581.7/km^{2})	January 4, 1845
Vandervoort	Town	Polk	115	87	+32.2%	0.288	0.75	399.3/sq mi (154.2/km^{2})	1896
Victoria	Town	Mississippi	20	37	−45.9%	0.316	0.82	63.3/sq mi (24.4/km^{2})	February 24, 1966
Vilonia	City (first class)	Faulkner	4,288	3,815	+12.4%	7.973	20.65	537.8/sq mi (207.7/km^{2})	August 23, 1938
Viola	Town	Fulton	358	337	+6.2%	1.571	4.07	227.9/sq mi (88.0/km^{2})	July 6, 1941
Wabbaseka	Town	Jefferson	180	255	−29.4%	0.344	0.89	523.3/sq mi (202.0/km^{2})	April 12, 1920
Waldenburg	Town	Poinsett	53	61	−13.1%	0.136	0.35	389.7/sq mi (150.5/km^{2})	August 15, 1958
Waldo	City (second class)	Columbia	1,151	1,372	−16.1%	2.194	5.68	524.6/sq mi (202.6/km^{2})	August 13, 1888
Waldron†	City (first class)	Scott	3,386	3,618	−6.4%	5.634	14.59	601.0/sq mi (232.0/km^{2})	December 17, 1852
Walnut Ridge†	City (first class)	Lawrence	5,384	4,890	+10.1%	16.620	43.05	323.9/sq mi (125.1/km^{2})	October 29, 1880
Ward	City (first class)	Lonoke	6,052	4,067	+48.8%	4.304	11.15	1,406.1/sq mi (542.9/km^{2})	June 14, 1923
Warren†	City (first class)	Bradley	5,453	6,003	−9.2%	7.035	18.22	775.1/sq mi (299.3/km^{2})	December 26, 1850
Washington	City (second class)	Hempstead	94	180	−47.8%	1.007	2.61	93.3/sq mi (36.0/km^{2})	December 9, 1880
Watson	City (second class)	Desha	185	211	−12.3%	0.200	0.52	925.0/sq mi (357.1/km^{2})	December 2, 1907
Weiner	City (second class)	Poinsett	647	716	−9.6%	1.364	3.53	474.3/sq mi (183.1/km^{2})	December 2, 1907
Weldon	Town	Jackson	57	75	−24.0%	0.244	0.63	233.6/sq mi (90.2/km^{2})	November 30, 1961
West Fork	City (second class)	Washington	2,331	2,317	+0.6%	3.666	9.49	635.8/sq mi (245.5/km^{2})	May 18, 1885
West Memphis	City (first class)	Crittenden	24,520	26,245	−6.6%	28.842	74.70	850.1/sq mi (328.2/km^{2})	May 7, 1927
West Point	Town	White	170	185	−8.1%	0.430	1.11	395.3/sq mi (152.6/km^{2})	February 21, 1859
Western Grove	Town	Newton	354	384	−7.8%	1.077	2.79	328.7/sq mi (126.9/km^{2})	May 20, 1929
Wheatley	Town	St. Francis	279	355	−21.4%	3.071	7.95	90.8/sq mi (35.1/km^{2})	October 19, 1907
Whelen Springs	Town	Clark	47	92	−48.9%	0.234	0.61	200.9/sq mi (77.6/km^{2})	September 12, 1916
White Hall	City (first class)	Jefferson	5,581	5,526	+1.0%	7.064	18.30	790.1/sq mi (305.0/km^{2})	July 27, 1964
Wickes	Town	Polk	637	754	−15.5%	2.323	6.02	274.2/sq mi (105.9/km^{2})	December 14, 1944
Widener	Town	St. Francis	212	273	−22.3%	0.545	1.41	389.0/sq mi (150.2/km^{2})	July 17, 1909
Wiederkehr Village	City (second class)	Franklin	50	38	+31.6%	4.240	10.98	11.8/sq mi (4.6/km^{2})	September 15, 1975
Williford	Town	Sharp	79	75	+5.3%	0.349	0.90	226.4/sq mi (87.4/km^{2})	December 8, 1914
Willisville	Town	Nevada	148	152	−2.6%	1.597	4.14	92.7/sq mi (35.8/km^{2})	July 6, 1971
Wilmar	City (second class)	Drew	395	511	−22.7%	1.535	3.98	257.3/sq mi (99.4/km^{2})	March 8, 1899
Wilmot	City (second class)	Ashley	416	550	−24.4%	1.769	4.58	235.2/sq mi (90.8/km^{2})	May 3, 1898
Wilson	City (second class)	Mississippi	766	903	−15.2%	1.047	2.71	731.6/sq mi (282.5/km^{2})	March 19, 1959
Wilton	City (second class)	Little River	287	374	−23.3%	1.279	3.31	224.4/sq mi (86.6/km^{2})	February 8, 1894
Winchester	Town	Drew	137	167	−18.0%	0.497	1.29	275.7/sq mi (106.4/km^{2})	May 21, 1912
Winslow	City (second class)	Washington	365	391	−6.6%	1.822	4.72	200.3/sq mi (77.3/km^{2})	February 27, 1905
Winthrop	City (second class)	Little River	116	192	−39.6%	1.040	2.69	111.5/sq mi (43.1/km^{2})	May 12, 1912
Wooster	City (second class)	Faulkner	1,042	860	+21.2%	2.871	7.44	362.9/sq mi (140.1/km^{2})	April 28, 1958
Wrightsville	City (second class)	Pulaski	1,542	2,114	−27.1%	2.116	5.48	728.7/sq mi (281.4/km^{2})	January 3, 1973
Wynne†	City (first class)	Cross	8,314	8,367	−0.6%	8.994	23.29	924.4/sq mi (356.9/km^{2})	May 29, 1888
Yellville†	City (second class)	Marion	1,178	1,204	−2.2%	2.482	6.43	474.6/sq mi (183.3/km^{2})	January 3, 1855
Zinc	Town	Boone	92	103	−10.7%	0.751	1.95	122.5/sq mi (47.3/km^{2})	March 10, 1904
Total municipalities	—	—	2,002,869	1,878,493	+6.6%	2,494.407	6,460.48	802.9/sq mi (310.0/km^{2})	—
Arkansas	—	—	3,011,500	2,915,879	+3.3%	52,023.7	134,741	57.9/sq mi (22.4/km^{2})	—

== See also ==
- List of Arkansas townships
- List of census-designated places in Arkansas
- List of counties in Arkansas
