= Jim Walkup =

Jim Walkup may refer to:

- Jim Walkup (left-handed pitcher) (1895–1990), American baseball pitcher
- Jim Walkup (right-handed pitcher) (1909–1997), American baseball pitcher
