= Belleville, Arkansas =

- City
- Location of Belleville in Yell County, Arkansas.
- Coordinates: 35°05′30″N 93°26′45″W
- Country: United States
- State: Arkansas
- County: Yell

Area
  - Total: 1.86 sq mi (4.83 km^{2})
  - Land: 1.86 sq mi (4.83 km^{2})
  - Water: 0 sq mi (0.00 km^{2})
- Elevation: 358 ft (109 m)

Population (2020)
  - Total: 312
  - Estimate (2025): 309 ▼
  - Density: 167.1/sq mi (64.53/km^{2})
- Time zone: UTC-6 (Central (CST))
  - Summer (DST): UTC-5 (CDT)
- ZIP code: 72824
- Area code: 479
- FIPS code: 05-04960
- GNIS feature ID: 2403845
- Website: http://encyclopediaofarkansas.net/encyclopedia/entry-detail.aspx?entryID=6096

Belleville is a city in Yell County, Arkansas, United States. The population was 312 at the 2020 census. It is part of the Russellville Micropolitan Statistical Area.

== Geography ==
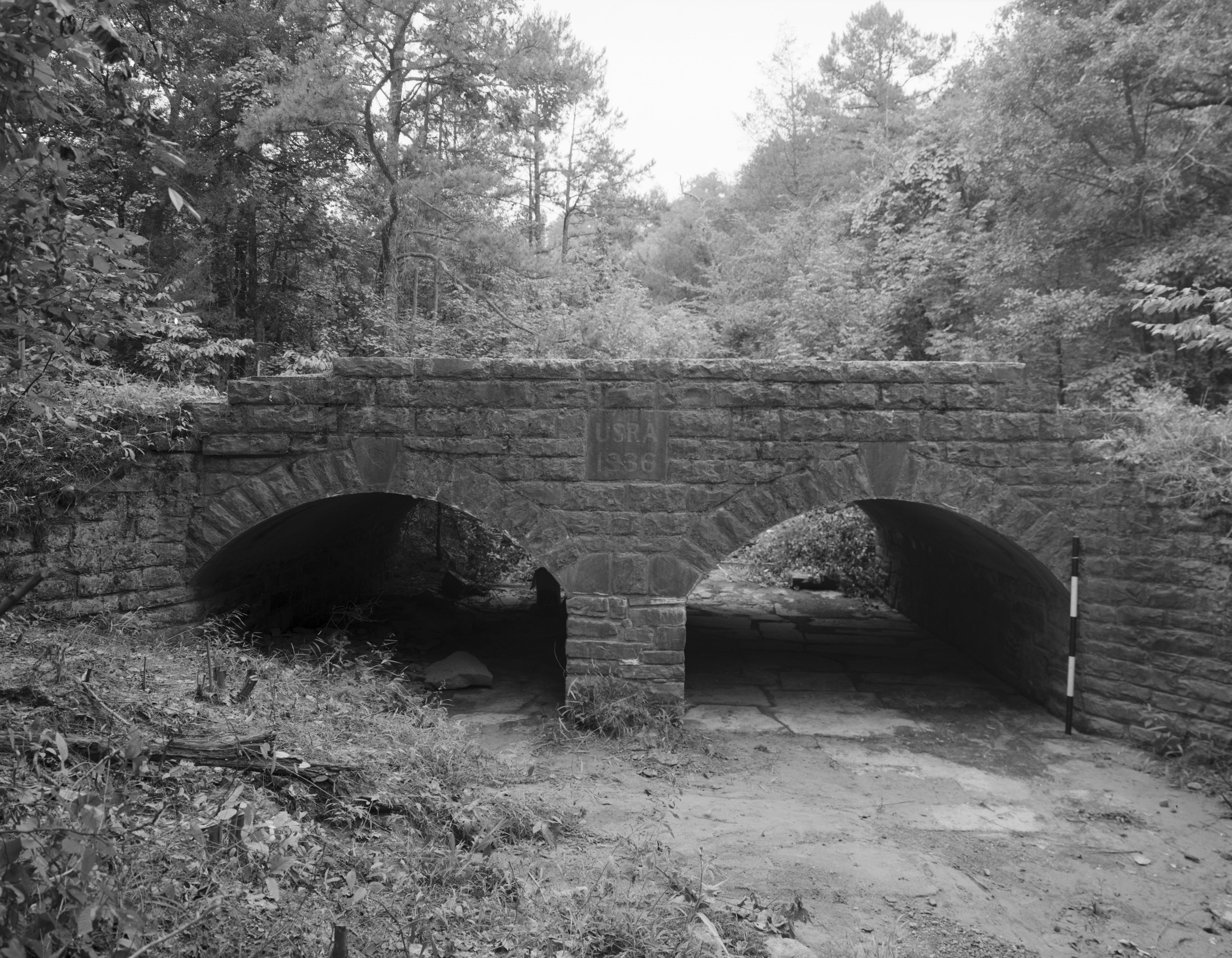
The Spring Lake Bridge north of Belleville is listed on the National Register of Historic Places

According to the United States Census Bureau, the city has a total area of 1.9 square miles (4.9 km^{2}), all land.

== Demographics ==
Historical population
Census	Pop.	Note	%±
2010	441		—
2020	312		−29.3%
2025 (est.)	309	▼	−1.0%
U.S. Decennial Census

As of the census of 2000, there were 371 people, 140 households, and 105 families residing in the city. The population density was 200.5 inhabitants per square mile (77.4/km^{2}). There were 176 housing units at an average density of 95.1 per square mile (36.7/km^{2}). The racial makeup of the city was 81.67% White, 0.81% Black or African American, 7.55% Asian, 5.66% from other races, and 4.31% from two or more races. 6.47% of the population were Hispanic or Latino of any race.

There were 140 households, out of which 32.9% had children under the age of 18 living with them, 50.7% were married couples living together, 19.3% had a female householder with no husband present, and 25.0% were non-families. 20.7% of all households were made up of individuals, and 10.7% had someone living alone who was 65 years of age or older. The average household size was 2.65 and the average family size was 3.04.

In the city, the population was spread out, with 26.7% under the age of 18, 11.3% from 18 to 24, 26.1% from 25 to 44, 22.9% from 45 to 64, and 12.9% who were 65 years of age or older. The median age was 36 years. For every 100 females, there were 92.2 males. For every 100 females age 18 and over, there were 90.2 males.

The median income for a household in the city was $25,625, and the median income for a family was $27,875. Males had a median income of $18,750 versus $18,036 for females. The per capita income for the city was $10,482. About 20.9% of families and 22.1% of the population were below the poverty line, including 38.0% of those under age 18 and 22.5% of those age 65 or over.

== Education ==
Public education for early childhood, elementary and secondary school students is provided by:

- Danville School District, which leads to graduation from Danville High School.
- Western Yell County School District, which leads to graduation from Western Yell County High School.

== Notable person ==
- Mary McCormic, opera singer
