= Western Yell County School District =

School district in Arkansas

Address
- 1 Wolverine Drive Havana, Arkansas, 72842; United States

District information
- Type: Public
- Grades: PreK–12
- NCES District ID: 0500041

Students and staff
- Students: 380
- Teachers: 43.3
- Staff: 44.28
- Student–teacher ratio: 8.78

Other information
- Website: www.wycschools.com

Western Yell County School District is public school district based in the rural, distant community of Havana, Arkansas, United States. The school district provides early childhood, elementary and secondary education from prekindergarten through grade 12. The district encompasses 154.47 square miles (400.1 km^{2}) of land, in western Yell County, to include the following communities: Havana, Belleville, and a part of Corinth. It is the smallest of four public school districts in Yell County with two facilities and serving approximately 500 students per year.

== History ==
Western Yell County School District was formed on July 1, 1985 by the consolidation of the former Belleville School District and Havana School District.

In 2012, Western Yell County High School was nationally recognized as a silver medalist in the Best High Schools Report developed by U.S. News & World Report. The school was ranked No. 1,746 in the nation and No. 15 in the state.

== Schools ==
- Western Yell County High School – serving students in grades 7 through 12.
- Western Yell County Elementary School – serving students in prekindergarten through grade 6.

== See also ==
- List of school districts in Arkansas
