= Western Yell County High School =

Location
- 1 Wolverine Drive; Havana, Arkansas 72842; United States; 35°6′34″N 93°31′26″W

Information
- School type: Public comprehensive
- Opened: 2008 (18 years ago)
- Status: Open
- School district: Western Yell County School District
- CEEB code: 041050
- NCES School ID: 050004101315
- Teaching staff: 25.12 (on FTE basis)
- Grades: 7–12
- Enrollment: 248 (2010–11)
- Student to teacher ratio: 10.24
- Education system: ADE Smart Core
- Classes offered: Regular, Advanced Placement (AP)
- Colors: Maroon and silver
- Athletics conference: 2A Region 4
- Sports: Football, golf, basketball, baseball, softball, track, cheer
- Mascot: Wolverine
- Team name: Western Yell County Wolverines
- Accreditation: ADE
- USNWR ranking: No. 1,746 (USA); No. 15 (AR)
- Communities served: Havana, Belleville
- Website: www.wycschools.com

Western Yell County High School is comprehensive public high school located in the rural, distant community of Havana, Arkansas, United States. The school provides secondary education for students in grades 7 through 12 for the rural communities of Havana and Belleville and nearby unincorporated communities of western Yell County, Arkansas. It is the sole high school administered by the Western Yell County School District.

Its boundary includes Havana, Belleville, and a part of Corinth.

== Academics ==
Western Yell County High School is accredited by the Arkansas Department of Education (ADE) and the assumed course of study follows the Smart Core curriculum developed by the ADE, which requires students complete at least 22 units prior to graduation. Students complete regular coursework and exams and may take Advanced Placement (AP) courses and exam with the opportunity to receive college credit.

In 2012, Western Yell County High School was ranked by U.S. News & World Report No. 1,746 in the nation and No. 15 in the state.

== Athletics ==
The Western Yell County High School mascot and athletic emblem is the wolverine with maroon and silver serving as the school colors.

The Western Yell County Wolverines compete in interscholastic activities within the 2A Classification—the state's second smallest classification—via the 2A Region 4 Conference, as administered by the Arkansas Activities Association. The Wolverines field teams in golf (boys/girls), basketball (boys/girls), track and field (boys/girls), baseball, fastpitch softball, and competitive cheer.
