= Danville High School (Arkansas) =

Location
- 201 East 11th Street; Danville, Arkansas 72833; United States; 35°3′3″N 93°23′14″W

Information
- Type: Public secondary
- School district: Danville School District
- NCES District ID: 0504890
- CEEB code: 040565
- NCES School ID: 050489000212
- Principal: Tressy Fowler
- Teaching staff: 46.68 (on FTE basis)
- Grades: 9-12
- Enrollment: 234 (2023–2024)
- Student to teacher ratio: 5.01
- Campus type: Rural
- Colors: Green and white
- Athletics conference: 3A Region 4 (2012–14)
- Sports: Football, basketball, competitive cheer, dance, golf, baseball, softball, soccer
- Mascot: Little Johns
- Team name: Danville Little Johns
- Feeder schools: Danville Middle School
- Affiliations: Arkansas Activities Association
- Website: www.dps-littlejohns.net/34791_3

Danville High School is a comprehensive public secondary school located in Danville, Arkansas, United States, for students in grades nine through twelve. Danville is the sole high school administered by the Danville School District.

The boundary of the school district and that of the high school includes Danville and a portion of Corinth.

== Curriculum ==
The assumed course of study for students is to complete the Smart Core curriculum developed by the Arkansas Department of Education (ADE), which requires students complete at least 22 units for graduation. Course offerings include regular and Advanced Placement classes and exams with opportunities for college credit via AP exam or via concurrent credit at University of Arkansas Community College at Morrilton (UACCM) and Arkansas Tech University (ATU). The school is accredited by the ADE.

=== Fine Arts ===
Danville High was named by the Grammy Foundation as a 2005 Grammy Signature School Enterprise Award school for their achievement in the arts and recognizes efforts made by schools that are economically underserved.

== Athletics ==
The Danville High School mascot and athletic emblem is known as the Little Johns with the school colors of green and white.

For the 2012–2014 seasons, the Danville Little Johns participate in the 3A Region 4 Conference. Competition is primarily sanctioned by the Arkansas Activities Association with student-athletes competing in football, basketball (boys/girls), competitive cheer, dance, golf (boys/girls), baseball, softball, tennis (boys/girls), and track and field (boys/girls).

The school mascot "Little Johns" is a rough English translation of the French words Petit Jean, words synonymous with the local legend of a heroic young French girl which also gives the name to a nearby river, mountain and Arkansas' first state park.

== Notable people ==
- Lloyd R. George, former Danville Mayor, served in the Arkansas House of Representatives from 1963 to 1967 and 1973–1997.
