= Jim Walkup (left-handed pitcher) =

American baseball player (1895–1990)

- Pitcher
- Born: November 3, 1895; Havana, Arkansas, U.S.
- Died: June 12, 1990 (aged 94); Duncan, Oklahoma, U.S.
- Batted: Right Threw: Left

MLB debut
- April 30, 1927, for the Detroit Tigers

Last MLB appearance
- May 16, 1927, for the Detroit Tigers

MLB statistics
- Win–loss record: 0–0
- Earned run average: 5.40
- Strikeouts: 0
- Stats at Baseball Reference

Teams
- Detroit Tigers (1927)

James Huey Walkup (November 3, 1895 – June 12, 1990) was an American Major League Baseball pitcher. Walkup made two relief appearances for the Detroit Tigers in 1927, finishing with a 0–0 record and a 5.40 ERA. He batted right-handed and threw left-handed.

Walkup was born in Havana, Arkansas, and died in Duncan, Oklahoma.
