= Corinth, Arkansas =

- Town
- Location of Corinth in Yell County, Arkansas.
- Coordinates: 35°04′09″N 93°25′24″W
- Country: United States
- State: Arkansas
- County: Yell

Area
  - Total: 3.15 sq mi (8.16 km^{2})
  - Land: 3.09 sq mi (8.00 km^{2})
  - Water: 0.058 sq mi (0.15 km^{2})
- Elevation: 341 ft (104 m)

Population (2020)
  - Total: 45
  - Estimate (2025): 40 ▼
  - Density: 14.6/sq mi (5.62/km^{2})
- Time zone: UTC−6 (Central (CST))
  - Summer (DST): UTC−5 (CDT)
- ZIP Code: 72824
- Area code: 479
- FIPS code: 05-15310
- GNIS feature ID: 2406313

Corinth is a town in Yell County, Arkansas, United States. The population was 45 at the 2020 census. It is part of the Russellville Micropolitan Statistical Area.

== Geography ==
According to the United States Census Bureau, the town has a total area of 8.4 km^{2} (3.2 sq mi), of which 8.1 km^{2} (3.1 sq mi) is land and 0.3 km^{2} (0.12 sq mi) (4.00%) is water.

== Demographics ==
Historical population
| Census | Pop. | Note | %± |
|---|---|---|---|
| 1980 | 38 | | — |
| 1990 | 63 | | 65.8% |
| 2000 | 65 | | 3.2% |
| 2010 | 70 | | 7.7% |
| 2020 | 45 | | −35.7% |
| 2025 (est.) | 40 | ▼ | −11.1% |
U.S. Decennial Census

As of the census of 2000, there were 65 people, 25 households, and 18 families residing in the town. The population density was 8.0 people/km^{2} (21 people/mi^{2}). There were 29 housing units at an average density of 3.6 units/km^{2} (9.3 units/mi^{2}). The racial makeup of the town was 96.92% White, 3.08% from other races. 24.62% of the population were Hispanic or Latino of any race.

There were 25 households, out of which 24.0% had children under the age of 18 living with them, 60.0% were married couples living together, 8.0% had a female householder with no husband present, and 28.0% were non-families. Of all households 28.0% were made up of individuals, and 12.0% had someone living alone who was 65 years of age or older. The average household size was 2.60 and the average family size was 3.22.

In the town, the population was spread out, with 21.5% under the age of 18, 12.3% from 18 to 24, 24.6% from 25 to 44, 26.2% from 45 to 64, and 15.4% who were 65 years of age or older. The median age was 36 years. For every 100 females, there were 124.1 males. For every 100 females age 18 and over, there were 131.8 males.

The median income for a household in the town was $28,125, and the median income for a family was $44,375. Males had a median income of $16,607 versus $19,167 for females. The per capita income for the town was $10,926. There were 9.1% of families and 10.6% of the population living below the poverty line, including no under eighteens and 5.9% of those over 64.

== Education ==
Public education for early childhood, elementary and secondary school students is available from two school districts, depending on where one is located in Corinth:

- Danville School District, which leads to graduation from Danville High School.
- Western Yell County School District, which leads to graduation from Western Yell County High School
