= Havana, Arkansas =

- City
- Location of Havana in Yell County, Arkansas.
- Coordinates: 35°06′35″N 93°31′34″W
- Country: United States
- State: Arkansas
- County: Yell

Area
  - Total: 0.60 sq mi (1.56 km^{2})
  - Land: 0.60 sq mi (1.56 km^{2})
  - Water: 0 sq mi (0.00 km^{2})
- Elevation: 374 ft (114 m)

Population (2020)
  - Total: 239
  - Estimate (2025): 235 ▼
  - Density: 397.7/sq mi (153.55/km^{2})
- Time zone: UTC-6 (Central (CST))
  - Summer (DST): UTC-5 (CDT)
- ZIP code: 72842
- Area code: 479
- FIPS code: 05-30790
- GNIS feature ID: 2404662
- Website: arcityofhavana.com

Havana is a city in northwest Yell County, Arkansas, United States. As of the 2020 census, Havana had a population of 239. It is part of the Russellville Micropolitan Statistical Area. Arkansas Scenic State Highway 309 leads from Havana to the top of Mount Magazine, home of Arkansas's newest State Park, and the highest peak in Arkansas.

Havana is located between Booneville and Danville on State Highway 10. The area has views of Mount Magazine, the tallest mountain in Arkansas. West of Havana lies Blue Mountain Lake, a US Army Corps of Engineers Lake, which provides recreational fishing, camping, swimming and boating.

Havana is in the Petit Jean River Valley, with the Ouachita Mountain range to the south, and the Ozark Mountain range to the north. Mount Magazine to the north provides camping, cabins, hiking, hang gliding and rock climbing.

Havana is home to several small businesses, and the Western Yell County High School and Jr. High School Wolverines.

The area is rural, covered with timber, pastures and row crop fields. Local industry centers on poultry, livestock and crops. Trucking businesses, garment production, poultry equipment supplies, and wood-working industries are also present. Natural Gas production has also increased dramatically since approximately 2004.

Although small, the City of Havana provides city water, sewer and trash service to its residents, as well as a Rural Fire Department with several pumper, tanker and brush fire trucks.

Just opened in January 2008, was the Western Yell County Medical Clinic on AR 10 West, followed by a new High School which opened in December 2008.

== Geography ==
According to the United States Census Bureau, the city has a total area of 0.5 square miles (1.3 km^{2}), all land.

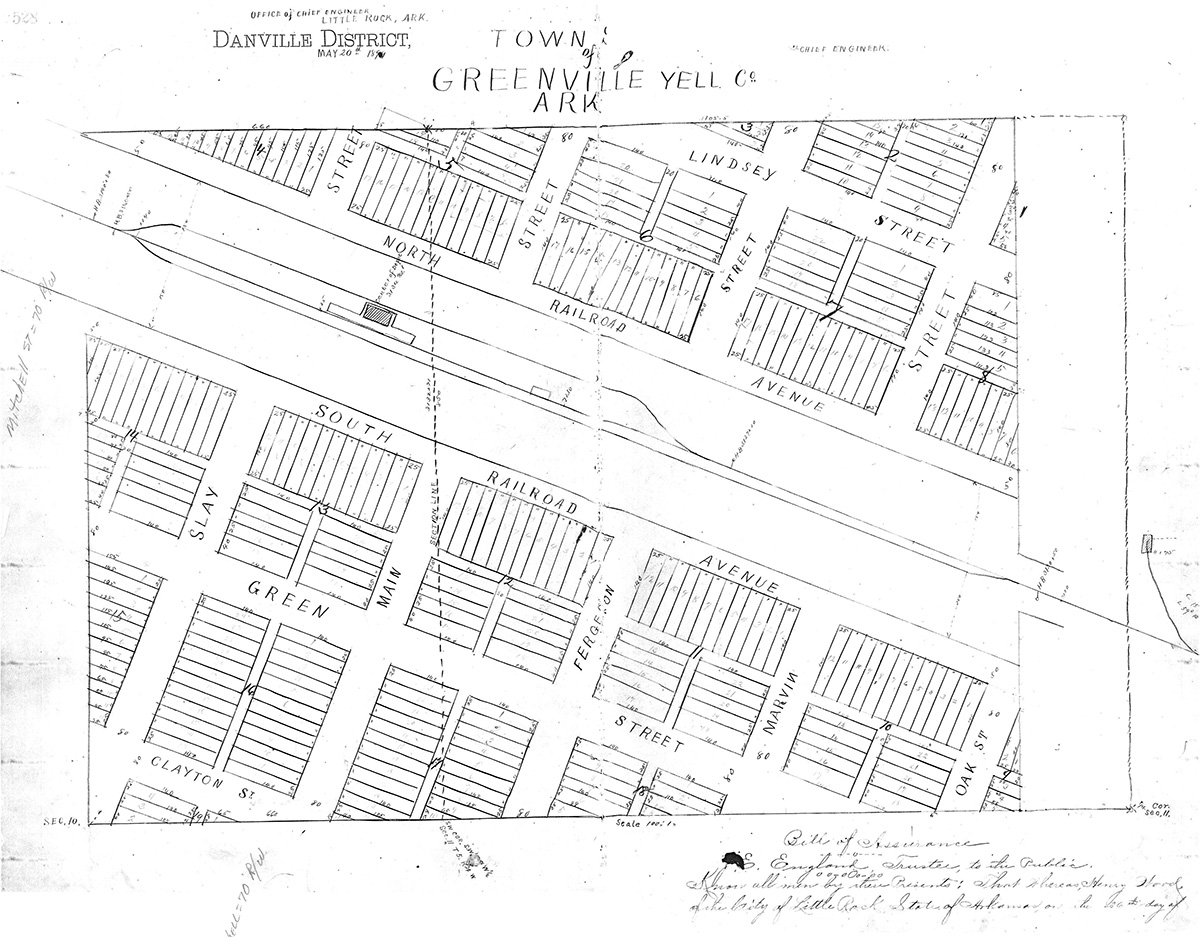
Map of Havana, AR before it was Havana.

== Demographics ==
Historical population
Census	Pop.	Note	%±
1910	621		—
1920	449		−27.7%
1930	370		−17.6%
1940	449		21.4%
1950	348		−22.5%
1960	277		−20.4%
1970	308		11.2%
1980	352		14.3%
1990	358		1.7%
2000	392		9.5%
2010	375		−4.3%
2020	239		−36.3%
2025 (est.)	235	▼	−1.7%
U.S. Decennial Census

As of the census of 2000, there were 392 people, 141 households, and 101 families residing in the city. The population density was 822.0 inhabitants per square mile (317.4/km^{2}). There were 160 housing units at an average density of 335.5 per square mile (129.5/km^{2}). The racial makeup of the city was 83.93% White, 0.77% Native American, 1.79% Asian, 11.22% from other races, and 2.30% from two or more races. 17.86% of the population were Hispanic or Latino of any race.

There were 141 households, out of which 38.3% had children under the age of 18 living with them, 55.3% were married couples living together, 13.5% had a female householder with no husband present, and 27.7% were non-families. 22.7% of all households were made up of individuals, and 10.6% had someone living alone who was 65 years of age or older. The average household size was 2.78 and the average family size was 3.25.

In the city, the population was spread out, with 29.1% under the age of 18, 12.2% from 18 to 24, 29.8% from 25 to 44, 14.5% from 45 to 64, and 14.3% who were 65 years of age or older. The median age was 32 years. For every 100 females, there were 107.4 males. For every 100 females age 18 and over, there were 100.0 males.

The median income for a household in the city was $30,625, and the median income for a family was $27,500. Males had a median income of $18,558 versus $17,222 for females. The per capita income for the city was $10,963. About 20.2% of families and 24.2% of the population were below the poverty line, including 39.1% of those under age 18 and 20.3% of those age 65 or over.

== Education ==
It is in the Western Yell County School District. It was formerly in the Havana School District, but that district consolidated into the Western Yell County district on July 1, 1985.

Western Yell County High School is in Havana.

== Notable people ==
- Johnny Sain, Major League Baseball pitcher
- James Elton Walkup, MLB pitcher
- James Huey Walkup, MLB pitcher
