= Danville School District (Arkansas) =

School district in Arkansas, United States

Location
- East 11th Street and Atlanta; Danville, Arkansas 72833 United States

District information
- Grades: PK–12
- Superintendent: Kim Foster
- Accreditation(s): Arkansas Department of Education
- Schools: 3
- NCES District ID: 0504890

Students and staff
- Students: 919
- Teachers: 81.17 (on FTE)
- Staff: 166.17 (on FTE)
- Student–teacher ratio: 11.32
- Athletic conference: 3A Region 4 (2012–14)
- District mascot: Little Johns
- Colors: Green; White

Other information
- Website: www.dps-littlejohns.net

Danville School District is a public school district based in Danville, Arkansas, United States. The district encompasses 143.63 square miles (372.0 km^{2}) of land, and serves early childhood, elementary and secondary education to a section of Yell County, including Danville and a portion of Corinth.

== Schools ==
- Danville High School, located in Danville and serving more than 250 students in grades 9 through 12.
- Danville Middle School, located in Danville and serving more than 150 students in grades 6 through 8.
- S. C. Tucker Elementary School, located in Danville and serving more than 450 students in pre-kindergarten through grade 5.
