= Clarksville Reds =

- 1924; Clarksville, Arkansas

Minor league affiliations
- Class: Class D (1924)
- League: Western Arkansas League (1924)

Major league affiliations
- Team: None

Minor league titles
- League titles (0): None
- Conference titles (0): None

Team data
- Name: Clarksville Reds (1924)
- Ballpark: Clarksville City Ballpark (1924)

The Clarksville Reds were a minor league baseball team based in Clarksville, Arkansas. In 1924, the Reds played the season as members of the Western Arkansas League, a six–team Class D level league. The Western Arkansas League permanently folded after its one season of minor league play. Clarksville hosted minor league home games at the Clarksville City Ballpark.

== History ==
In 1924, minor league baseball was first hosted in Clarksville, when the Clarksville "Reds" began play as members of the six–team Class D level Western Arkansas League. The Western Arkansas League was formed for the 1924 season with E.H. Nichols from Clarksville serving as league president.

The Teams from Atkins, Arkansas (Atkins Boys), Dardanelle, Arkansas (Dardanelle White Sox), Ozark, Arkansas (Ozark Bears), Paris, Arkansas (Paris Blues) and Russellville, Arkansas (Russellville Miners) joined Clarksville as charter members. Clarksville and the Western Arkansas League members began league play on May 5, 1924.

The league created a 60-game schedule with a split–season format, with the winner of each split–season meeting in the finals to decide the championship. Before the season, league president E.H. Nichols issued a letter in the local newspaper of each host city, asking for good sportsmanship.

In the league opener, Clarksville played at Ozark and won the game by the score of 7–5. The Reds then defeated the Ozarks again in the second game 6–2.

In their first season of play, the 1924 Clarksville Reds had the second–best overall record in the Western Arkansas League. The Reds finished the Arkansas League overall standings with a record of 31–28, placing second and finishing 4.0 games behind the first place Russellville Miners. Clarksville was managed by Red Basham, a Clarksville native who also served at the Reds' starting catcher.

After ending in a tie with Russellville, the Dardanelle White Sox won the first–half title, winning a playoff 3 games to 0 against the Miners after a tie, in which teams finished with 17–13 records, with Clarksville in fifth place ending the first half with a 14–16 record. Russellville then won the second–half title outright with a 19–11 record.

At the end of the first half, Clarksville starting first baseman Oliver Clift left the team to become an umpire in the league. After the season, Clift returned to his home in Waxahachie, Texas, where he became a community leader. An elementary school in the city bears his name. Future major league player Al Williamson led the Reds' pitching staff.

Clarksville was part of a controversy in the second–half season final standings, that negated a possible first-place finish. An August 12, 1924, Atkins' win over Russellville was later reversed due to Atkins using an ineligible player, giving the second–half title outright to Russellville. Player Frank Cash was used illegally by Atkins on "loan" from the Arkansas Travelers. Clarksville had also lost an extra innings game to last place Ozarks on that date. Before the ruling and after their extra innings loss, Clarksville, Russellville and Atkins had ended in a three-way tie for first place, with all three teams having 18–12 records. The ruling kept Clarksville's record at 18–12, raised Russellville to 19–11 and dropped Atkins to 17–13.

In the Finals, Russellville swept Dardanelle 3 games to 0 to win the championship, with a Reds player on the roster and the Ozarks' manager leading the Russellville team in the post season. Before the final series against Russellville, Dardanelle made a request to shorten the series to a best of five-game series instead of a best of seven and the request was granted. The two teams were allowed to add three players each from the other league teams who had ceased play. In a sudden move, Russellville had three more players leave the team, resulting in a roster overhaul before the series began, after selecting three more players from other league teams. Russellville player/manager Jimmy Johnson was among the three leaving the team, replaced for the playoff by Red Day, who had managed Ozark during the regular season. Clarksville player Buster Ramsey joined Russellville for the playoff series.

The Western Arkansas League did not return to play in 1925 and never reformed. Clarksville, Arkansas has not hosted another minor league team.

== The ballpark ==
The Clarksville Reds hosted minor league home games at the Clarksville City Ballpark. The ballpark was located at West Cline Street & Fairgrounds Road in Clarksville. Today, the location is still in use as a public park, containing the "Clarksville City Park."

== Year–by–year record ==
| Year | Record | Finish | Manager | Playoffs/Notes |
|---|---|---|---|---|
| 1924 | 31–28 | 2nd | Red Basham | Did not qualify |

== Notable alumni ==
- Al Williamson
