= Matt Zimmerman (basketball) =

Biographical details
- Born: St. Vincent, Arkansas

Coaching career (HC unless noted)
- 1995–1998: Plainview-Rover HS
- 1999–2002: Dardanelle HS
- 2002–2006: UAB (asst.)
- 2006–2011: Missouri (asst.)
- 2011–2016: Arkansas (asst.)
- 2016–2019: Arkansas (Dir. of Basketball Operations)

Matt Zimmerman is a former assistant basketball coach at the University of Arkansas and a former Arkansas Razorbacks basketball team manager. A member of Delta Upsilon fraternity, Zimmerman graduated from the University of Arkansas in 1990. He went on to serve in the United States Army until 1995 reaching the rank of Captain. He then went on to serve as an athletic director and coach at the high school level before joining Mike Anderson's staff at UAB and Missouri. He is well known for his work ethic and commitment to coaching. Zimmerman headed up the walk-on tryouts while at both UAB and Missouri.

== Playing career ==
Zimmerman was a standout basketball player for Wonderview High School from 1981 to 1985, where his team had a combined 133–19 record in four years capped off by a 36–4 record and a state runner-up finish his junior season.

After high school, Zimmerman worked as a student manager for the Arkansas Razorbacks for three seasons (1987–88, 1988–89 and 1989–90) under head coach Nolan Richardson and assistant coach Mike Anderson. During those three seasons Arkansas had an overall record of 76–21, a conference record of 42–6, two conference titles, and three National Collegiate Athletic Association tournament appearances including a final four in 1990.

== Military career ==
After college, Zimmerman served in the United States Army from 1990 to 1995. He graduated from the Army Airborne School in 1991 and served as Platoon Leader, shop officer, company executive officer and Battalion S-1 on his way to achieving the rank of captain.

== Coaching career ==
=== High school coaching career ===
Upon completing his time in the military, Zimmerman entered the basketball coaching ranks in his home state of Arkansas. From 1995 to 1998, Zimmerman served as the athletic director and Head Basketball Coach for the now defunct Plainview-Rover High School. While there he led the team to three conference titles and was selected as the conference coach of the year in 1996.

In 1998 Zimmerman took the head coaching job at Dardanelle High School in Dardanelle, Arkansas. In his four years there the team accumulated a 74–46 record and captured the Class 4A State Title in the 2001–2002 season. This success led Zimmerman to be named the KARV Dream Team Coach of the Year and River Valley Radio Coach of the Year in 2000.

=== College coaching career ===
When Nolan Richardson was let go at the University of Arkansas, the Razorbacks hired Stan Heath rather than long term assistant coach Mike Anderson, who had been an assistant for 17 seasons under Richardson. Instead the University of Alabama-Birmingham (UAB), located in Anderson's home town of Birmingham, Alabama, gave Anderson a chance to be a head coach. Zimmerman joined Anderson's staff at UAB until Anderson accepted the position of head basketball coach at the University of Missouri in 2006. Zimmerman followed Anderson to Missouri and served on his staff as an assistant until Anderson accepted the head coaching job at the University of Arkansas in 2011. On April 6, 2011, it was announced Zimmerman would join Anderson's staff at Arkansas. Zimmerman spent five years as an assistant and then another three years as the Director of Basketball Operations. He is currently a color analyst for the Razorback Sports Network and co-host, with Quinn Grovey, of The Razorback Daily podcast.
