= Dardanelle High School =

Location
- 1079 North State, Highway 28; Dardanelle, Arkansas 72834; United States; 35°12′26″N 93°9′22″W

Information
- Type: Public secondary
- Established: 2011 (15 years ago)
- School district: Dardanelle School District
- NCES District ID: 0504930
- CEEB code: 040575
- NCES School ID: 050493000214
- Principal: Jamie Burris
- Teaching staff: 88.58 (on FTE basis)
- Grades: 9–12
- Enrollment: 666 (2023–2024)
- Student to teacher ratio: 7.52
- Campus type: Rural
- Colors: Red and white
- Athletics conference: 4A Region 4
- Sports: Baseball, basketball, competitive cheer, football, golf, soccer, softball
- Mascot: Sand Lizard
- Team name: Dardanelle Sand Lizards
- Feeder schools: Dardanelle Middle School
- Affiliations: Arkansas Activities Association
- Website: www.dardanellepublicschools.org/o/dhs

Dardanelle High School is a comprehensive public secondary school located in Dardanelle, Arkansas, United States, for students in grades nine through twelve. Dardanelle is the sole high school administered by the Dardanelle School District and serves three counties in the Arkansas River Valley area and as the main feeder school for Dardanelle Middle School. The school is known as the only high school with the Sand Lizard as its school mascot.

== Curriculum ==
The assumed course of study for students is to complete the Smart Core curriculum developed by the Arkansas Department of Education (ADE), which requires students complete at least 22 units for graduation. Course offerings include regular and Advanced Placement classes and exams with opportunities for college credit via AP exam or via concurrent credit at University of Arkansas Community College at Morrilton (UACCM) and Arkansas Tech University (ATU). The school is accredited by the ADE.

Dardanelle High School participates in the EAST Initiative. In 2008 and 2011, Dardanelle High School was honored with the EAST Founder's Award.

== Athletics ==
The Dardanelle High School mascot is the Sand Lizard with the school colors of red and white.

For the 2012-2014 seasons, the Dardanelle Sand Lizards participate in the 4A Region 4 Conference. Competition is primarily sanctioned by the Arkansas Activities Association with student-athletes competing in baseball, basketball (boys/girls), competitive cheer, competitive dance, football, golf (boys/girls), soccer (boys/girls), softball, tennis (boys/girls), track and field (boys/girls), volleyball and wrestling.

Each year, Dardanelle and rival Danville High School football teams compete for the (Yell County) Judge's Cup.

== Notable people ==
- Henderson M. Jacoway (1887), former United States Representative
- James Lee Witt (1962), former FEMA director
- John Daly (1984 - transferred), PGA Champion golfer
- Matt Zimmerman (1985), college basketball coach
- Tom Cotton (1995), United States Senator
