= Archerd =

Archerd is a surname. Notable people with the surname include:

- Army Archerd (1922–2009), American columnist
- Selma Archerd (1925–2023), American actress, wife of Army Archerd
- William Dale Archerd (1912–1977), American serial killer

== See also ==
- Archer (surname)
