= Western Arkansas League =

- Classification: Class D (1924)
- Sport: Minor League Baseball
- First season: 1924
- Folded: 1924
- President: E.H. Nichols (1924)
- No. of teams: 6
- Country: United States of America
- Most titles: 1 Russellville Miners (1924)
- Related competitions: Arkansas State League

The Western Arkansas League was a short–lived minor league baseball league that played in the 1924 season. The six–team Class D level league consisted of franchises based exclusively in Arkansas. The league permanently folded after one season of minor league play, with the Russellville Miners winning the league championship.

== History ==
The Western Arkansas League played in the 1924 season as a Class D level league, with E.H. Nichols serving as league president. Teams from Atkins, Arkansas (Atkins Boys), Clarksville, Arkansas (Clarksville Reds), Dardanelle, Arkansas (Dardanelle White Sox), Ozark, Arkansas (Ozark Bears), Paris, Arkansas (Paris Blues) and Russellville, Arkansas (Russellville Miners) were the charter members. The league began play on May 5, 1924.

The league was formed at a time when only two cities in Arkansas (Little Rock and Fort Smith) hosted minor league teams. Ozark was the final team to commit to playing in the six–team Western Arkansas League. The league was scheduled to play 60 games in a split–season format, with the winner of each split–season meeting in the finals to decide the champion. League president E.H. Nichols published a letter in the newspaper of each host city, asking for good sportsmanship.

The Western Arkansas League applied to the National Association for Class D level status. The request was initially denied, with the National Association stating the league cities were too small. Team rosters were set at 12 players, including the managers, with payroll capped at $1,000. The league eventually played at the Class D level. The Arkansas College Athletic Association allowed their college players to play for league teams and remain eligible to play for their college teams.

The league began play on May 5, 1924, and completed the split–season schedule. On August 3, 1924, Walter Jacoway pitched a perfect game for Dardanelle against Atkins.

The Dardanelle White Sox won the first–half title, winning a playoff against the Russellville Miners after a tie. Russellville won the second–half title. An August 12, 1924, Atkins' win over Russellville was reversed due to an ineligible player, giving the second–half title to Russellville. Originally, Russellville, Atkins and Clarksville had ended in a three–way tie for first place. In the Finals, Russellville swept Dardanelle 3 games to 0 to win the championship.

The Western Arkansas did not return to play in 1925 and never reformed.

== League teams ==
Team name	City represented	Ballpark	Year(s) active
Atkins Boys	Atkins, Arkansas	McLaren Park	1926
Clarksville Reds	Clarksville, Arkansas	Clarksville City Ballpark	1926
Dardanelle White Sox	Dardanelle, Arkansas	Johnston Park	1926
Ozark Bears	Ozark, Arkansas	Unknown	1926
Paris Blues	Paris, Arkansas	Unknown	1926
Russellville Miners	Russellville, Arkansas	Aggie Park	1926

== League standings ==
First–half standings

Team standings	W	L	PCT	GB	Managers
Dardanelle White Sox	17	13	.552	–	Buddy Hodges / Lee Stebbins / Fred Austerman
Russellville Miners	17	13	.552	–	Ed Cowan / Jimmy Johnson; Red Day
Paris Blues	15	15	.517	1	Rudy Kling
Atkins Boys	15	15	.483	2	Wilson Daniel
Clarksville Reds	14	16	.440	3	Red Basham
Ozark Bears	13	17	.440	3	Red Day

Second–half standings

Team standings	W	L	PCT	GB
Russellville Miners	19	11	.633	–
Clarksville Reds	18	12	.600	1
Atkins Boys	17	13	.566	2
Paris Blues	13	17	.444	6
Dardanelle White Sox	12	18	.400	7
Ozark Bears	11	19	.367	8

Playoff: Dardanelle 3 games Russellville 0 - For first half title.
Finals: Russellville 3 games, Dardanelle 0.
