= Russellville Miners (Arkansas) =

- 1924; Russellville, Arkansas

Minor league affiliations
- Class: Class D (1924)
- League: Western Arkansas League (1924)

Major league affiliations
- Team: None

Minor league titles
- League titles (1): 1924
- Conference titles (1): 1924

Team data
- Name: Russellville Miners (1924)
- Ballpark: Buerkle Field (1924)

The Russellville Miners were a minor league baseball team based in Russellville, Arkansas. In 1924, the Miners played the season as members of the Western Arkansas League, a six–team Class D level league, winning the league championship. The league permanently folded after one season of minor league play.

The Russellville Miners hosted minor league home games at Buerkle Field.

== History ==
In 1924, minor league baseball was first hosted in Russellville, when the Russellville "Miners" began play as members of the six–team Class D level Western Arkansas League. The Western Arkansas League played in the 1924 season with E.H. Nichols serving as league president. The teams from Atkins, Arkansas (Atkins Boys), Clarksville, Arkansas (Clarksville Reds), Dardanelle, Arkansas (Dardanelle White Sox), Ozark, Arkansas (Ozark Bears) and Paris, Arkansas (Paris Blues) joined Russellville as charter members. The Western Arkansas League began its first season of play on May 5, 1924.

The Russellville "Miners" nickname corresponds to local geology, history and industry, as the city has a strong history of coal mining. The Anthracite Coal Mining Company was located in Russellville in the era, with a facility that had a daily capacity of 800 tons.

The league was formed for the 1924 season and the Ozark franchise was the final team to officially join the six–team Western Arkansas League. The league operated with a 60-game schedule and utilized a split–season format, with the winner of each split–season meeting in the finals to decide the champion. League president E.H. Nichols published a formal letter in the local newspaper of each host city, asking for good sportsmanship.

The league began play on May 5, 1924, and completed the split–season schedule.

In their first season of play, the 1924 Russellville Miners won the Western Arkansas League championship. The Miners led the Arkansas League overall standings with a record of 36–24, placing first and finishing 4.0 games ahead of second place Clarksville. Russellville was managed by Ed Cowan and Jimmy Johnson.

After ending in a tie with Russellville, the Dardanelle White Sox won the first–half title, winning a playoff 3 games to 0 against the Miners after a tie, in which teams finished with 17–13 records. Russellville won the second–half title outright with a 19–11 record. In the first half tie-breaker playoff, the best of five games were played on Wednesdays and Saturdays as the two teams continued playing in the second half. Dardanelle won the first playoff game at home on a squeeze bunt in the bottom of the 9th inning. The second game was held at Buerkle Field in Russellville, with Dardanelle winning by the score of 3–1. On July 16, 1924, Dardanelle won the third game 3–2 and secured a spot in the league finals following the season.

There was controversy in the second–half season standings. An August 12, 1924, Atkins' win over Russellville was later reversed due to Atkins using an ineligible player, giving the second–half title to Russellville. Originally, Russellville, Atkins and Clarksville had ended in a three-way tie for first place with all three teams having 18–12 records. The ruling kept Atkins at 18–12, raised Russellville to 19–11 and dropped Atkins to 17–13.

In the Finals, Russellville swept Dardanelle 3 games to 0 to win the championship. Before the final series against Russellville, Dardanelle made a request to shorten the series to a best of five-game series instead of a best of seven. The White Sox wished to play barnstorm games in Searcy, Arkansas, Hot Springs, Arkansas and Little Rock, Arkansas following the season and the request was granted. The two teams were also allowed to add three players each from the other league teams who had ceased play. In a sudden move, Russellville had three more players leave the team, resulting in a roster overhaul before the series began, after selecting three more players from other league teams. Player/manager Jimmy Johnson was among the three leaving the team, replaced for the playoff by Red Day. Day had been player/manager of the Clarksville Reds during the regular season.

In the playoff finals, the Russellville Miners swept Dardanelle 3 games to 0 to win the championship. In the first game at Dardanelle, Russellville won by a score of 7–3. Russellville won game two by the score of 6–2, to lead two games to zero. In game three, Russellville won the game 5–4 at Dardanelle, giving Russellville the championship.

The Western Arkansas League did not return to play in 1925 and never reformed. Russellville, Arkansas has not hosted another minor league team.

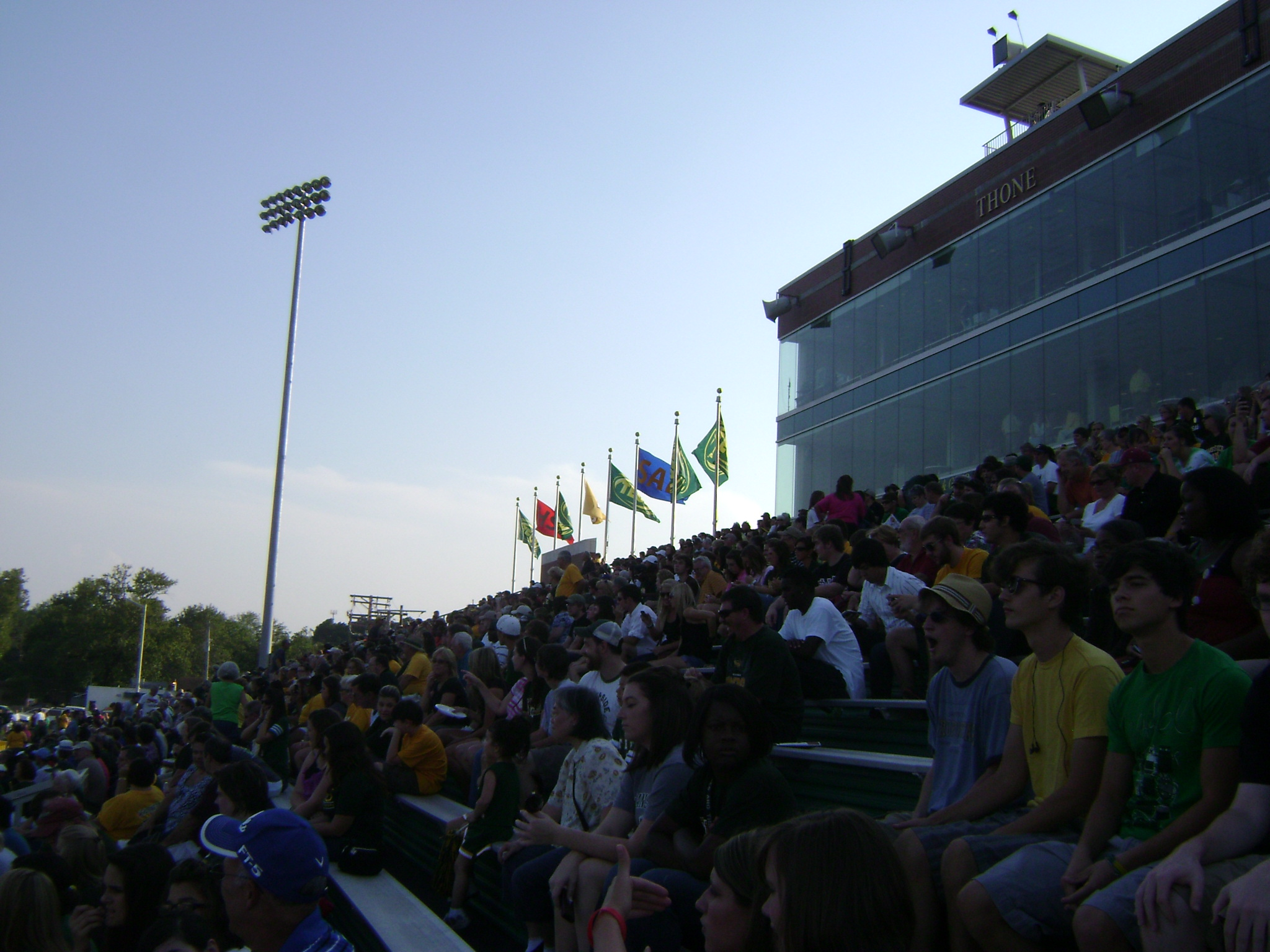
(2010) Thone Stadium at Buerkle Field. Arkansas Tech University.

== The ballpark ==
The Russellville Miners hosted minor league home games at what was nicknamed Aggie Park. Their ballpark was at the site named "Buerkle Field." The facility was opened in April 1923 as the athletic fields for the Second District Agricultural School, known today as Arkansas Tech University. The field was named after John G. Buerkle, who was an engineering and mathematics instructor at the college and was instrumental in planning and engineering the school athletic facilities. Today, after numerous renovations and improvements through the decades, the site contains "Throne Stadium at Buerkle Field" and the field houses various facilities for the Arkansas Tech athletic teams. The site location is on the campus of the university and is located at 1202 North El Paso Avenue in Russellville.

== Year–by–year record ==
Year	Record	Finish	Manager	Playoffs/Notes
1924	36–24	1st	Ed Cowan / Jimmy Johnson; Red Day	Won second–half pennant League champions

== Notable alumni ==
No players for the 1924 Russellville Miners reached the major leagues.
