= Dardanelle School District =

School district in Arkansas, United States

Address
- 102 South Front Street Dardanelle, Arkansas, 72834; United States

District information
- Type: Public
- Grades: K–12
- NCES District ID: 0504930

Students and staff
- Students: 2,075
- Teachers: 177.04
- Staff: 140.0
- Student–teacher ratio: 11.72

Other information
- Website: www.dardanellepublicschools.org

Dardanelle School District is a public school district in Dardanelle, Arkansas, United States. The school district provides comprehensive education to residents of northern Yell County, in the Arkansas River Valley area. It also serves the unincorporated area of Delaware in Logan County.

In 2012, Dardanelle School District and its high school were recognized in the AP District of the Year Awards program in the College Board's 3rd Annual Honor Roll that consisted of 539 U.S. public school districts (6 in Arkansas) that simultaneously achieved increases in access to AP® courses for a broader number of students and improved the rate at which their AP students earned scores of 3 or higher on an AP Exam.

== History ==
In 1979 the Carden Bot school district merged into the Dardanelle district

== Schools ==
- Dardanelle High School (9-12)
- Dardanelle Middle School (7-8)
- Dardanelle Elementary School (3-6)
- Dardanelle Primary School (K-2)
