= Gwendolyn Wilson Fowler =

African-American pharmacist

- Born: Gwendolyn Mary Wilson; December 8, 1907; Dardanelle, Arkansas
- Died: November 19, 1997 (aged 89); Des Moines, Iowa
- Occupation: Pharmacist/chemist
- Years active: 1931–74
- Known for: First licensed African-American woman pharmacist in Iowa

Gwendolyn Wilson Fowler (December 8, 1907 – November 19, 1997) was an African-American pharmacist, the first black woman licensed in Iowa. She also became the first African-American woman from Iowa to serve in the United States Foreign Service, when she was posted to Vietnam in the 1950s. She was inducted into the Iowa Women's Hall of Fame in 1987.

== Biography ==
Gwendolyn Mary Wilson was born on December 8, 1907, in Dardanelle, Arkansas, to Fannie (née Robinson) and Dr. Cornelius Wilson, who moved his family and medical practice to Des Moines, Iowa, in 1913. Wilson attended Bryant Elementary School and then West High School of Des Moines, before going to a high school preparatory training school on the campus of Rust College, in Holly Springs, Mississippi. Graduating with honors in 1926, Wilson returned to Iowa and enrolled in pharmacy at the University of Iowa, in Iowa City. After a year, she transferred to the Des Moines College of Pharmacy, which later became the Drake College of Pharmacy, earning her degree in chemistry and pharmaceuticals in 1930, the first African-American woman in Iowa to attain a pharmacy degree. Upon officially registering as a pharmacist in Iowa in 1931, she became the first registered black pharmacist in the state.

== Career ==
After completing her education, Wilson was unable to find employment in Iowa and returned to Holly Springs, Mississippi, where she taught for a year. She returned to Des Moines and worked as a waitress for a time before being hired as a maid by Winnie Ewing Coffin. Coffin was an heiress who bequeathed a trust to the Des Moines Art Center in honor her husband Nathan Emory Coffin for the purchase of artworks. The two women embarked upon a world tour in 1936 to purchase artwork for the museum which was being constructed. Wilson's diary reveals that they had spent most of the year in California, setting out in November 1936 traveling from Seattle to Vancouver and Victoria, British Columbia, Canada, en route to Hawaii. By early December, they landed in Yokohama, Japan, and then proceeded to Hong Kong, China, Vietnam, Cambodia, Thailand, Australia, Sumatra, Bali, Java, Singapore, and back to Japan, where the trip ended following Coffin's sudden death. Wilson returned to Des Moines and on 19 January 1938, she married Lafe H. Fowler. Though she would keep his name, they were divorced in 1946.

In 1944, Fowler was able to secure employment in her field when she was hired by the State of Iowa as a pharmacy clerk. She worked for the state for 9 years, and then took a consultant's position at the Iowa State Department of Agriculture laboratory, working as a chemist. She caught the attention of the federal administration and was hired as one of the only 9 women and only woman of color to work in the United States Foreign Service. Prior to her appointment to Vietnam she served as a chemist in the US Department of Agriculture's commercial laboratory in Washington, DC undergoing training. In 1955, she was selected for an overseas assignment by the United States Foreign Operations Administration for a hospital post in Ethiopia, but though she was approved, the assignment was withdrawn because she was a woman. A few weeks later, she was approved for a similar post to Saigon. In 1957, she returned for a brief visit from Viet Nam, where she was serving as a program analyst and training officer. In 1959, Fowler was posted to Korea, and then returned to the Iowa Department of Agriculture laboratory after completion of her foreign service. In 1962, she began working as a staff pharmacist at Broadlawns Polk County Hospital, where she remained until her 1974 retirement.

During her retirement, Fowler was active in many volunteer organizations. She was a lifelong member of the NAACP, active in the American Association of University Women, the Red Cross, the Des Moines Civic Music Board, the Iowa State Drug Abuse Council, the Wilkie House and served on the board of directors of the YWCA. She was appointed to the Iowa Statewide Health Coordinating Council by Governor Robert D. Ray and received the Governor's Volunteer Award. In 1987, she was inducted into the Iowa Women's Hall of Fame.

Fowler died on November 19, 1997, and her papers were posthumously donated to the Iowa Women's Archives Collection at the University of Iowa Libraries in Iowa City, Iowa.

== Bibliography ==
- Bunkers, Suzanne L. (2001). Diaries of Girls and Women: A Midwestern American Sampler. Madison, Wisconsin: University of Wisconsin Press. ISBN 978-0-299-17223-7.
- Neff, Terry, ed. (1998). An Uncommon Vision. Des Moines, Iowa: Des Moines Art Center (distributed by Hudson Hills Press, New York). ISBN 978-1-879003-20-0.
