= Hesketh Golf Links =

- Site of Special Scientific Interest
- Location within Merseyside
- Location of Hesketh Golf Links.
- Area of search: Merseyside
- Grid reference: SJ352190
- Coordinates: 53.682°N 2.969°W
- Interest: Biological
- Area: 14.6 ha (36 acres)
- Notification date: 1989

Hesketh Golf Links is a 14.6-hectare (36-acre) Site of special scientific interest situated 2km north-east of Southport town centre in Merseyside. The site was notified in 1989 due to its biological features, in particular focusing on the presence of the nationally rare sand lizard (Lacerta agilis).
