= Dardanelle White Sox =

- 1924; Dardanelle, Arkansas

Minor league affiliations
- Class: Class D (1924)
- League: Western Arkansas League (1924)

Major league affiliations
- Team: None

Minor league titles
- League titles (0): None
- Conference titles (1): 1924

Team data
- Name: Dardanelle White Sox (1924)
- Ballpark: Johnston Park (1924)

The Dardanelle White Sox were a minor league baseball team based in Dardanelle, Arkansas. In 1924, the White Sox played the season as members of the Western Arkansas League, a six–team Class D level league, losing in the league playoff final. The league permanently folded after one season of minor league play. Dardanelle hosted minor league home games at the Johnston Park.

== History ==
In 1924, minor league baseball was first hosted in Dardanelle, when the Dardanelle "White Sox" were formed and became members of the six–team Class D level Western Arkansas League. The Western Arkansas League played in the 1924 season with E.H. Nichols serving as league president. The Teams based in Atkins, Arkansas (Atkins Boys), Clarksville, Arkansas (Clarksville Reds), Ozark, Arkansas (Ozark Bears), Paris, Arkansas (Paris Blues) and Russellville, Arkansas (Russellville Miners) joined Dardanelle as charter members.

In an early April 1924 meeting held at the Bee Hive Cafe in Dardanelle, W.A. Daniel was elected president of the Dardanelle Baseball Association and a committee was formed to raise the $2,000 necessary to begin the season.

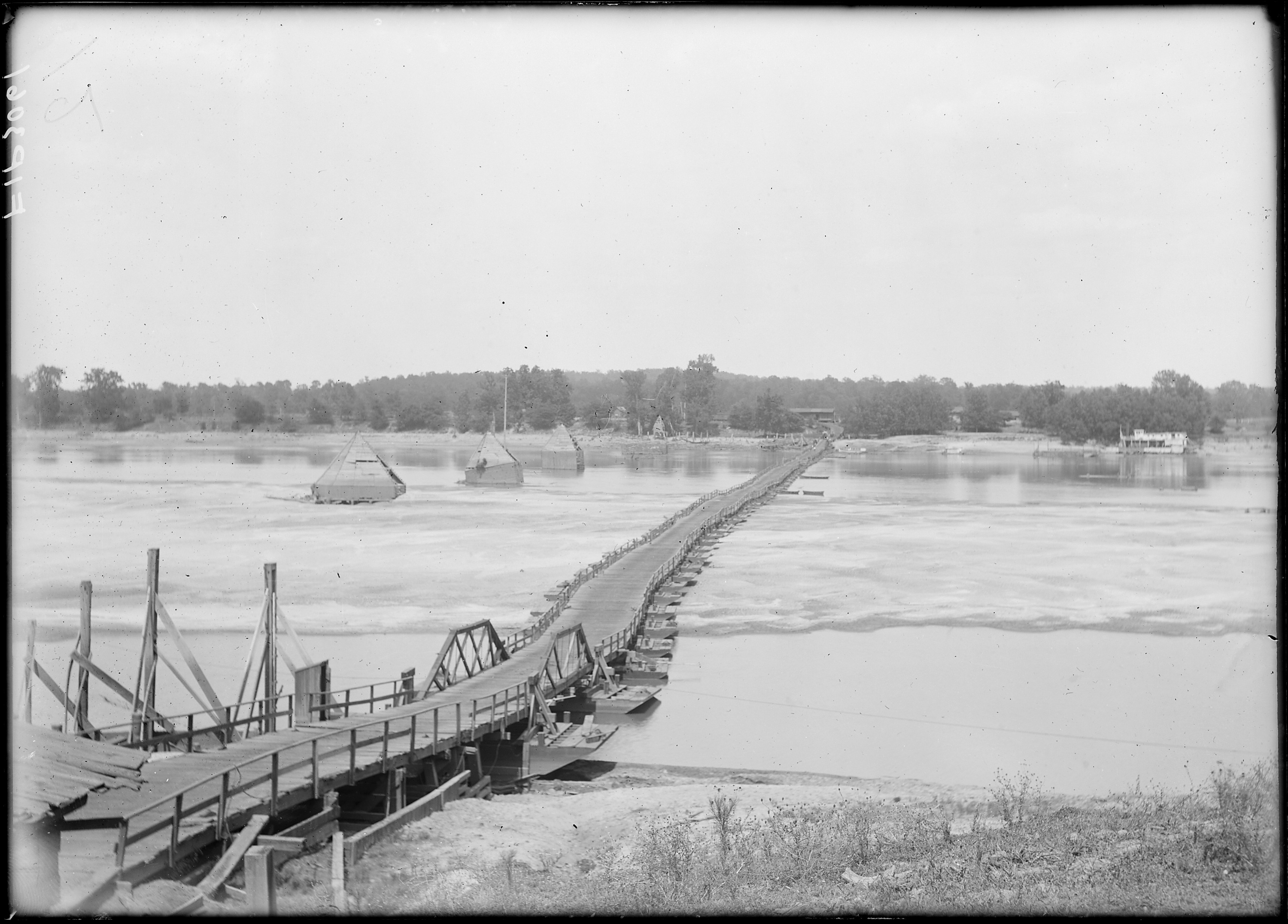
(1918) Dardanelle pontoon bridge. The longest pontoon bridge in the world, spanning Russellville and Dardanelle, Arkansas.

The Dardanelle pontoon bridge was the "World's Longest Pontoon Bridge" and connected Dardanelle and Russellville over the Arkansas River, while today's highway 22 connected Dardanelle to Paris and allowed auto travel to the other cities. Rail travel was also accessible and utilized by Dardanelle fans.

The Western Arkansas League began its first season schedule on May 5, 1924. The league formed for the 1924 season, with six host cities selected after the Ozark franchise became the last team to officially gain membership to the six–team Western Arkansas League. The league structure included a 60-game schedule and a split–season format, with the winner of each split–season meeting in the finals to decide the champion. Western Arkansas League president E.H. Nichols published notice in the local newspaper of each host city, asking for good sportsmanship among teams and fans. The Arkansas College Athletic Association allowed their college players to play for league teams and remain eligible for their college teams.

The league began play on May 5, 1924, with the split–season schedule. Dardanelle opened the season with a game at home against Paris, as the two cities were the only league teams south of the Arkansas River. 31 automobiles containing fans from Paris met the team and other fans at the train station and escorted the team and fans to the ballpark for the home opener. Paris won the opener by the score of 4–3, while the White Sox won the next three games against Paris to win three of the four games in the opening series. On August 3, 1924, White Sox pitcher Walter Jacoway pitched a perfect game for Dardanelle against the Atkins team.

The team was also informally called the "Sandies." The Bee Hive Cafe in Dardanelle hosted White Sox fans during away games in a "fan roost" held in the private dining room. Fans received live play by play over a "long distance telephone" and were charged a "small admission fee to listen" to the games.

In their first season of play, the 1924 Dardanelle White Sox reached the Western Arkansas League finals. The White Sox placed fourth in the Western Arkansas League overall standings with a record of 29–31, placing fourth and finishing 7.0 games behind first place Russellville. Dardanelle was managed by Buddy Hodges, Lee Stebbins and Fred Austerman.

After ending in a tie with Russellville, the Dardanelle White Sox won the first–half title, winning a playoff 3 games to 0 against the Miners. The playoff was scheduled after both teams ended the first–half schedule with identical 17–13 records. In the tie-breaker playoff, the best of five playoff games were scheduled by the league and were held on Wednesdays and Saturdays, as the two teams also continued playing their scheduled games in the second half of the season. Dardanelle won the first game at home on a squeeze bunt in the bottom of the 9th inning. The second game was held at Buerkle Field in Russellville, with Dardanelle winning by the score of 3–1. On July 16, 1924, Dardanelle won the third game 3–2 and secured a spot in the league finals following the season by winning the series.

After their playoff victory Dardanelle placed fifth in the second-half standings with a 12–18 record. Russellville won the second–half title outright with a 19–11 record, amidst controversy, setting up the two teams to meet in the playoff. Dardanelle was hampered in the second half by injuries to player/manager Lee Stebbins and shortstop Dewey Clayton and their pitching was affected by the additional playoff games.

An August 12, 1924, Atkins' win over Russellville was later reversed due to Atkins using an ineligible player. The reversal gave the second–half title to Russellville with an adjusted 19–11 record. Originally, Russellville, Atkins and Clarksville had ended in a three-way tie for first place with all three teams having 18–12 records.

Before the final series, Dardanelle successfully made a request to shorten the series to a best–of–five-game series instead of a best–of–seven-game series. The request was made because franchise wanted the White Sox to play barnstorm games in Searcy, Arkansas, Hot Springs, Arkansas and Little Rock, Arkansas following the season. In setting their rosters for the finals, the league allowed two teams to each add three players from the other league teams. In a sudden move before the finals began, Russellville had three more players leave the team, resulting in a roster overhaul before the series began, with the Miners filling those spots by selecting three more players from other league teams.

In the playoff finals, the Russellville Miners swept Dardanelle 3 games to 0 to win the championship. Russellville won game one 7–3, playing at Dardanelle. Russellville then won game two 6–2. In game three, Russellville won the game 5–4 after Dardanelle had scored two runs in the bottom of the 9th, giving Russellville the championship.

The Western Arkansas League did not return to league play in 1925 and the league never reformed. Dardanelle, Arkansas has not hosted another minor league team.

== The ballpark ==
The Dardanelle White Sox hosted 1924 minor league home games at Johnston Park.

== Year–by–year record ==
Year	Record	Finish	Manager	Playoffs/Notes
1924	29–31	4th	Buddy Hodges / Lee Stebbins; Fred Austerman	Won first–half pennant Lost in finals

== Notable alumni ==
- Carey Selph (1924)
