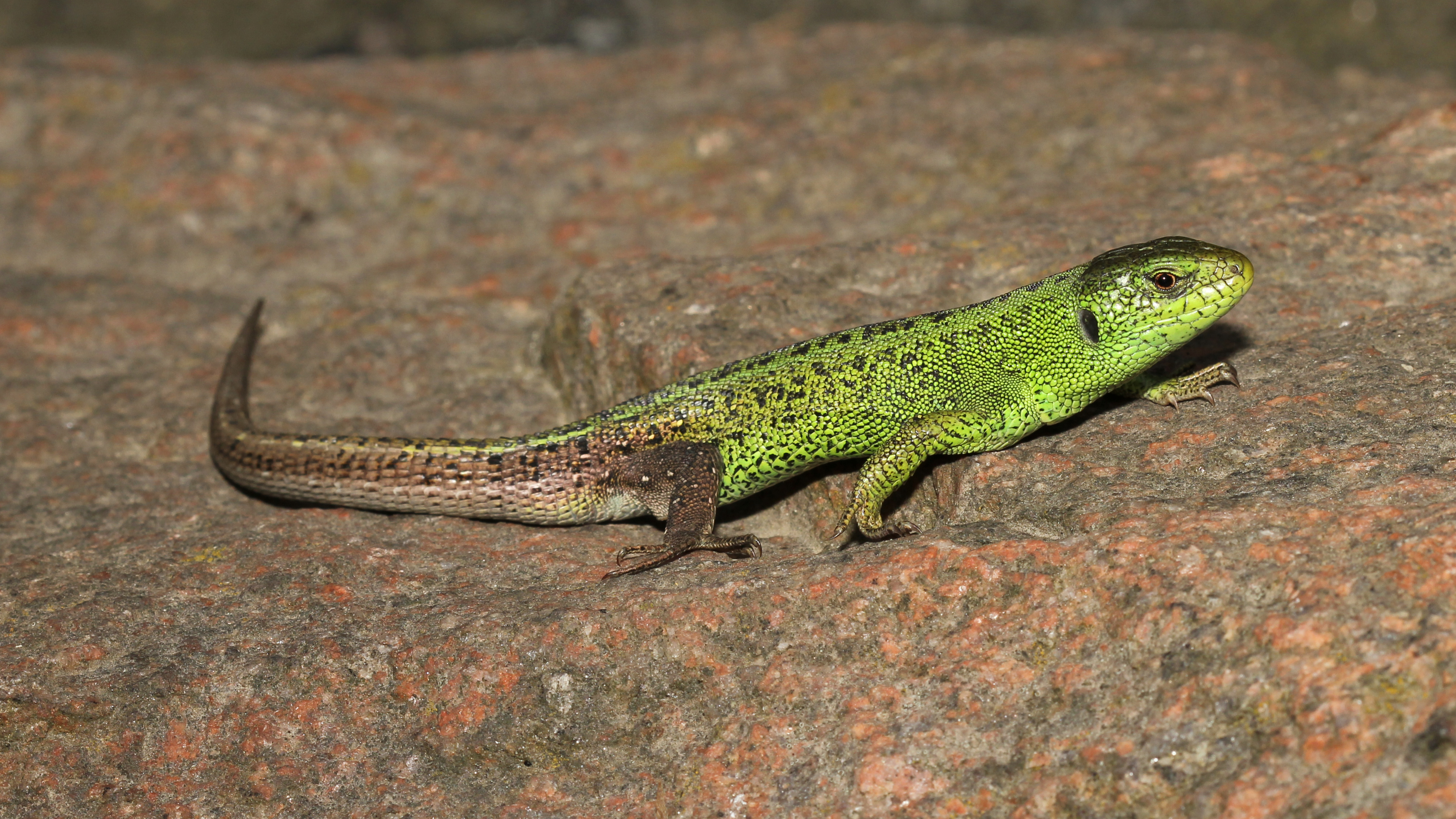
- Male
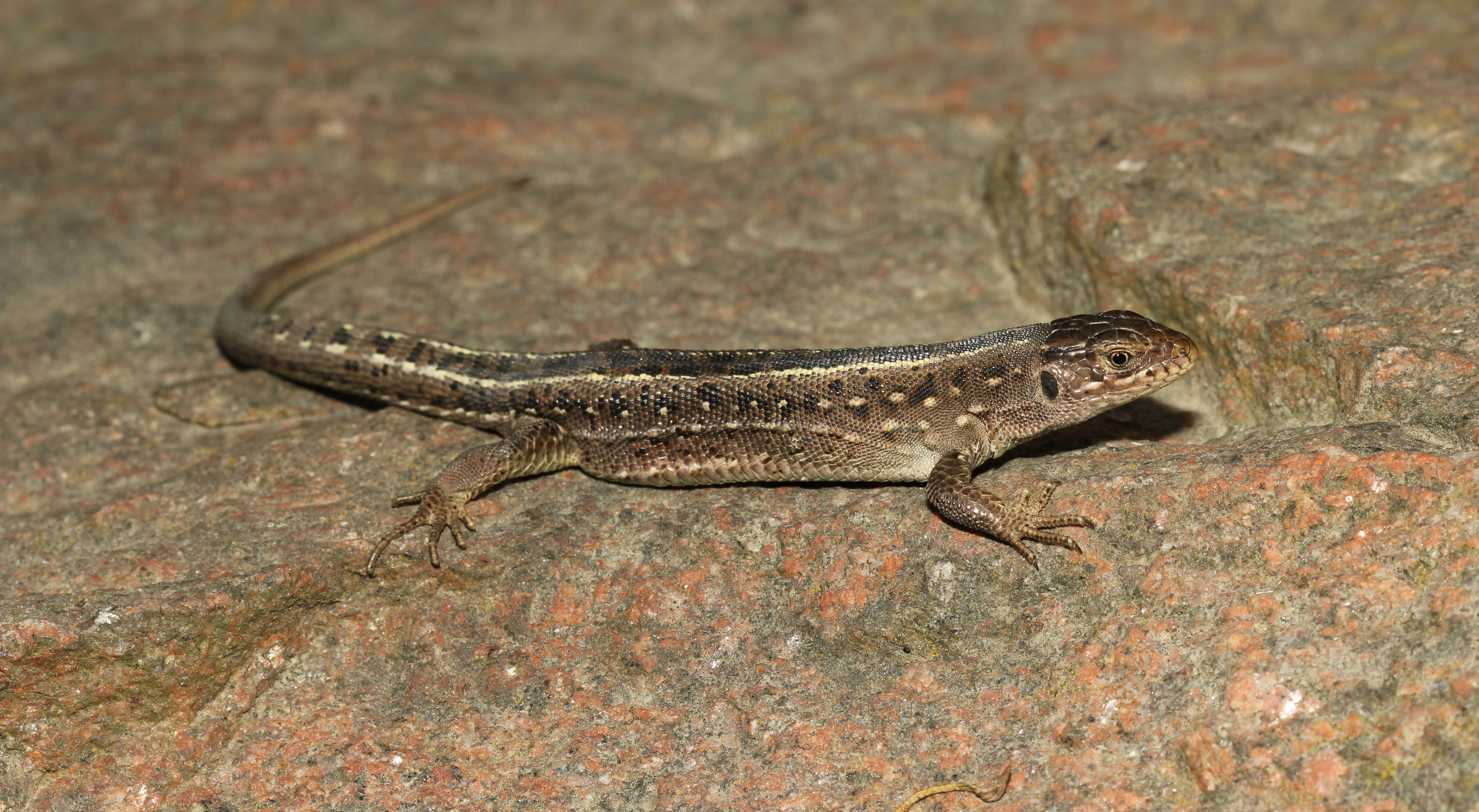
- Female

Conservation status
- Least Concern (IUCN 3.1)

Scientific classification
- Kingdom: Animalia
- Phylum: Chordata
- Class: Reptilia
- Order: Squamata
- Family: Lacertidae
- Genus: Lacerta
- Species: L. agilis

Binomial name
- Lacerta agilis Linnaeus, 1758
- Range of L. agilis Extant, resident

= Sand lizard =

Species of lizard

The sand lizard (Lacerta agilis) is a lacertid lizard. There are several subspecies, including L. a. agilis, L. a. argus, and L. a. exigua.

The sand lizard is distributed across most of Europe from the southern coast of Britain and across the continent to Lake Baikal in Russia. It does not occur in European Turkey. Its distribution is often patchy. In the northern extremes of the sand lizard's distribution, it survives by inhabiting seaside heathlands, where the ground temperature is elevated by the sun. The sand lizard uses warm sand to thermoregulate itself and to incubate its eggs.

Males are known for their bright coloration and aggressive, possessive behaviors when seasonally competing for females. In contrast to other squamates, the sand lizard's mating season is very short. Males choose mates selectively, whereas females mate more indiscriminately. Females usually lay only a single clutch of eggs per year.

Sand lizards spend most of their time basking, foraging, or under vegetation. They prefer to live in diverse habitats. They are largely solitary outside of mating season. Male sand lizards typically have larger territories than females, and they will compete with other males when territory overlaps. Females neighbour each other more amicably, occasionally sharing habitats.

Sand lizards may live up to ten years. Due to their longevity, they are sometimes prone to inbreeding.

== Description ==
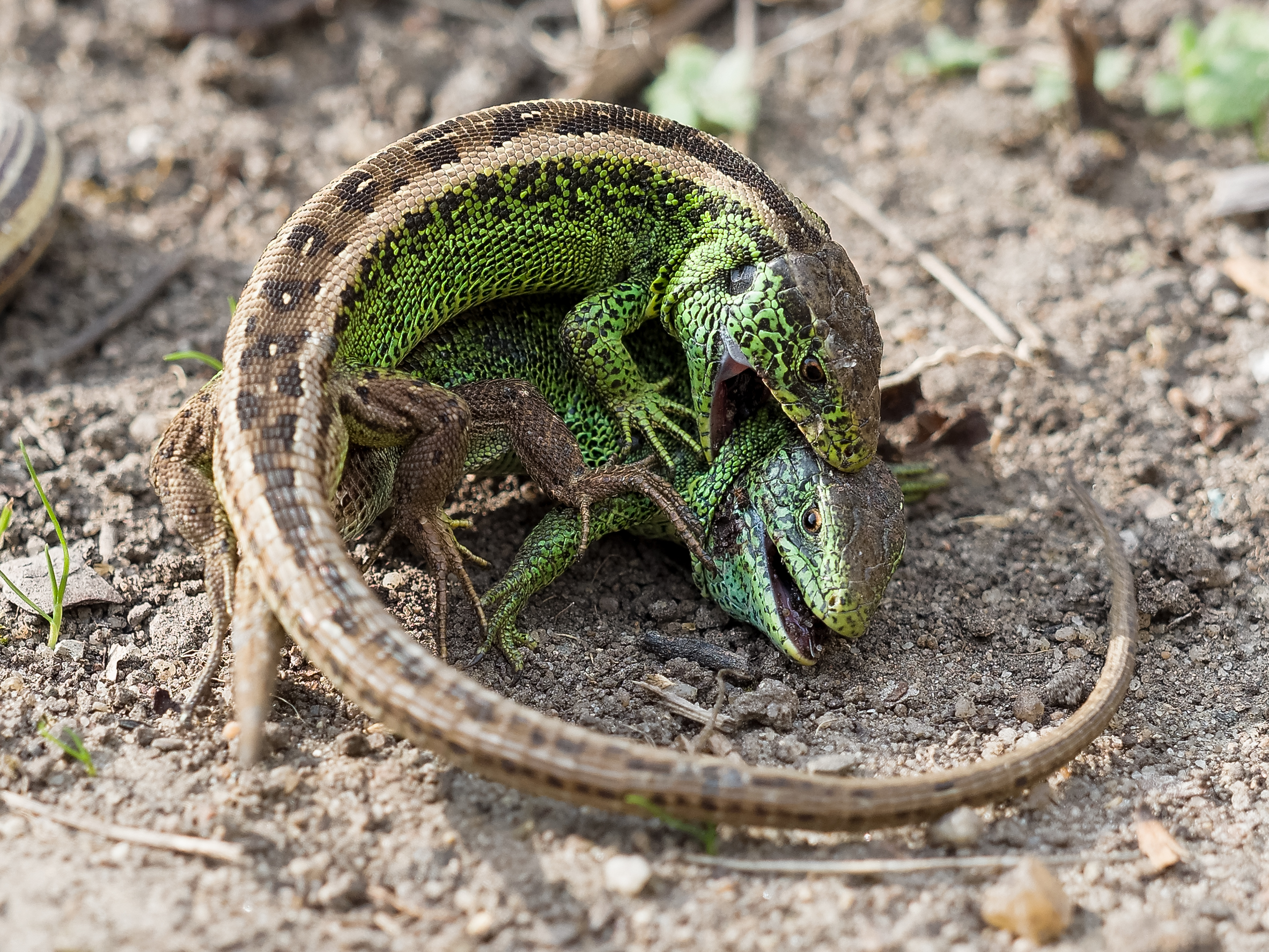
Males fighting

The sand lizard is a sexually dimorphic legged lizard. In northwest Europe, both sexes are characterised by lateral and dorsal strips of ocellated (eye-shaped) markings, which appear as dark patches with pale centres. Colouration varies across their European and Russian range. Males have finer markings than females, and their flanks turn bright green during the spring mating season, fading again in the late summer. Male adults may reach a total body length of 19.3 cm, where female adults may reach 18.5 cm.

In the two main western subspecies (L. a. agilis and L. a. argus), the dorsal stripe is thin and interrupted, or not present at all. L. a. argus also includes a plain red or brown-backed phase without any dorsal markings. In these two subspecies, only the flanks of the males turn green in the mating season, but in the eastern subspecies (predominantly L. a. exigua), males can be wholly green, even outside the breeding season.

Sand lizards can self-amputate their tails as a defence mechanism. This ability is called autotomy.

In males, the bright green genital coloration has been shown to be brighter depending on body mass and fighting ability. Males with brighter colors were more likely to initiate aggressive behaviors and win fights, which generally leads to them having a higher mating success. Females are more of a grey to brown color and can be seen with large bulging bellies full of eggs, from May to August.

Sand lizards can live for over ten years, with their average lifespan lasting between 5–6 years.

== Habitat and distribution ==
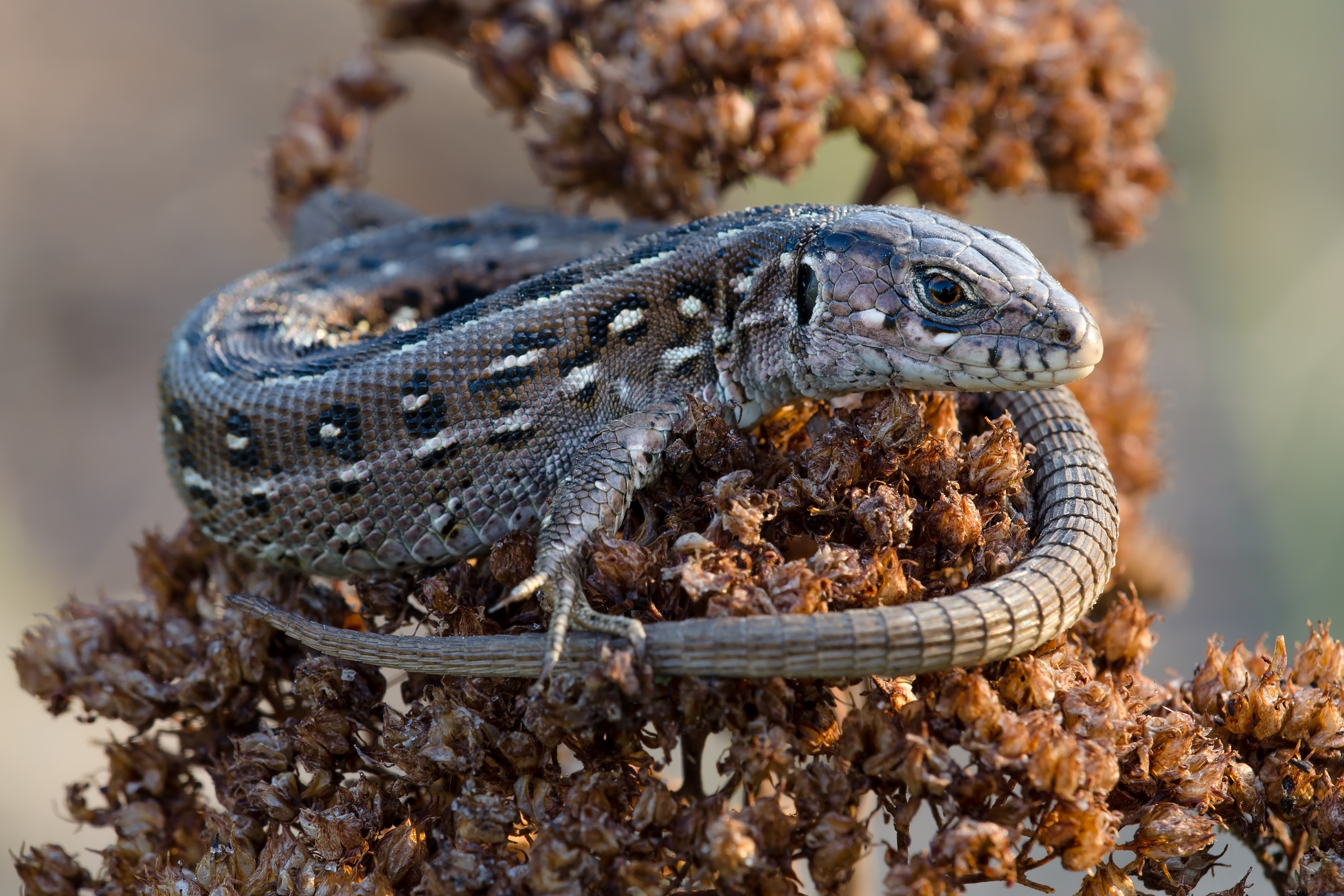
Puscha-Vodytsia Park, Kyiv

The sand lizard can be found in a variety of habitats. They prefer dry habitats, such as outcrops, fields, hills, beaches, heathland, sand dunes, and rock gardens. While in continental Europe the sand lizard has a wide variety of habitat, in colder places like Great Britain they depend on sand to incubate their eggs and such are restricted to coastal habitats.

Male sand lizards have home ranges with an extremely high amount of overlap; however, female sand lizards have much smaller home ranges (generally less than 100 meters squared) that neighbor each other, or they will even share burrows or basking areas with each other. They highly prefer and are much more active in areas with a wide variety of structural characteristics. This can create different temperature micro areas that they are able to move between depending on their needs.

== Behavior ==
=== General activity ===
Sand lizards spend extended periods of the day after emerging on long basking sessions. They occasionally take breaks to forage for resources. They also spend a considerable amount of time simply doing normal activity in areas under concealed vegetation. Under poor weather conditions, sand lizards emerge from resting locations later and bask less often throughout the day. Sand lizards most frequently bask on logs. This is most likely due to its absorption and slow release of heat radiation as well as providing a vantage point to spot potential predators and prey. They very rarely share basking sites with other lizards. Male sand lizards especially avoid sharing basking sites with each other, and are found only occasionally sharing with females. They avoid basking on open sand or soil and prefer to use vegetation if they bask on the ground. They thermoregulate themselves by moving between areas of high and low insolation.

=== Mate selection ===
In general, female mate choice in organisms is more selective than male mate choice. This is due to the fact that females generally have to invest more time and resources into offspring than males, who are under less selective pressures due to their low parental investment.

Generally females will simply reject male attempts at mating outside of their receptive mating period, doing so through a unique head bobbing behavior. However, during their period of receptivity, females have been known to not discriminate against different males and do not reject them besides when they are outside of this period.

Male sand lizards have been shown to highly prefer larger females when selecting mates, but they are still willing to mate with smaller females if the opportunity presents itself. It was observed that some males that were too small for the large females they attempted to court had troubles gripping females with their jaws during copulation due to their small size. This may be one constricting factor in their choice of mate.

== Reproduction ==
Generally, males reach sexual maturity at a smaller size compared with females. Vitellogenesis happens when females are 45 days for the whole population. Both sexes tend to lose body fat during mating period, since their main energy resources come from body fat and from the liver and proximal at the tail. After a few weeks from the hibernation, male adults become extremely aggressive towards each other, trying to mate as many females as they can.

The female sand lizard lays eggs in loose sand in a sunny location, leaving them to be incubated by the warmth of the ground.

Female sand lizards usually lay only a single clutch each year and clutch sizes that range between six and 15 eggs in a single one. However, there is a lot of variation in the time of year when females end up laying their eggs. But generally a single female sand lizard has a relatively consistent egg laying timing from year-to-year, with the first ones to do so generally being larger, more physically fit females. These early clutches ended up producing offspring that were larger, more successful, and had higher survival rates. Generally offspring from earlier clutches were higher quality offspring.

When female sand lizards produce larger clutch sizes, the size of each individual offspring in it has been observed to decrease. On the opposite side, smaller clutch sizes had fewer, but larger, offspring. When food resources were increased so it was not a limiting factor, clutch size increased significantly, so it is likely that sand lizards produce clutch sizes with different offspring sizes based on resource availability. The other factor that contributes is the physical constraints of the space available to lay their clutches in.

=== Reproductive success with age ===
Sand lizards have demonstrated that as their age increases, so does their reproductive success. However, a study showed that this relationship is most likely due to the increase in body size as sand lizards mature rather than increased experience they acquire as they live longer. This may be because female sand lizards that are larger are simply able to produce more clutches with the increased space in their bodies.

== Inbreeding avoidance ==
When a female sand lizard mates with two or more males, sperm competition within the female's reproductive tract may occur. Active selection of sperm by females appears to occur in a manner that enhances female fitness. On the basis of this selective process, the sperm of males that are more distantly related to the female are preferentially used for fertilization, rather than the sperm of close relatives. This preference may enhance the fitness of progeny by reducing inbreeding depression. Multiple inseminations of multiple fully fertile males can result in multiple paternity of the offspring. Mating order and time between copulations has been found to have no effect on the reproductive success of the first or last male to mate.

Natural malformed offspring have been observed in sand lizards most likely due to close kin inbreeding defects. Because of their relatively long lifespan and male polygynous mating, there is a decent chance of inbreeding occurring during their lifespan. Inbreeding has been seen to cause malformations in sand lizards with studies in laboratory settings mirroring the deformations seen naturally in the wild.

== Predators and competitors ==
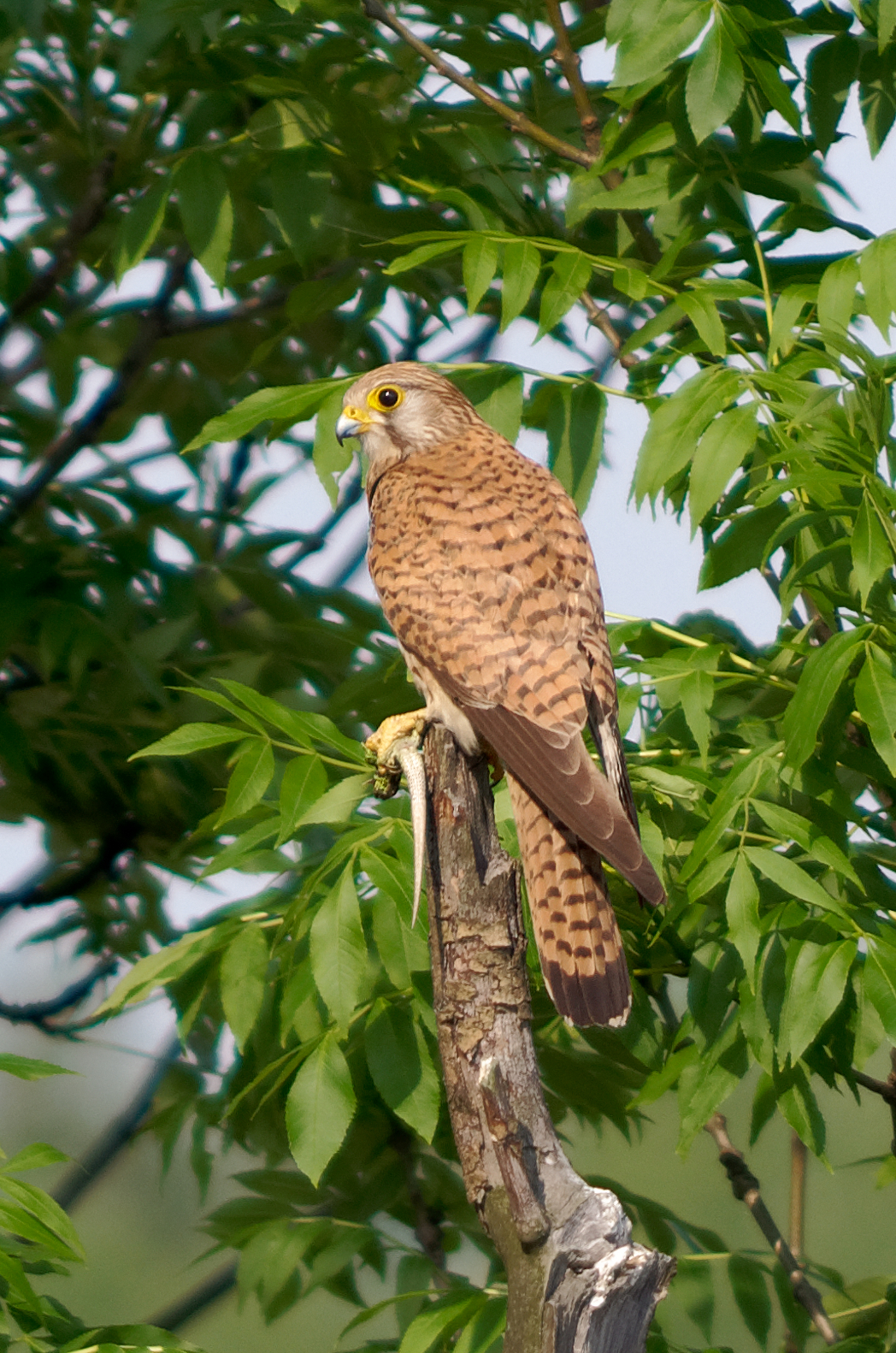
A female common kestrel with a caught sand lizard

Sand lizards are preyed upon by a variety of predators including mustelids, foxes, badgers, birds of prey, and snakes. In addition to wild predators, domestic species, such as pheasants, chickens, and cats.

Sand lizard locomotor performance, agility, and speed is related to their ability to avoid predators (as well as foraging efficiency). Like many lizards, sand lizards are able to separate their tail from the rest of their body in order to escape predators. Sand lizards with autotomy were able to run faster and as a result were better at avoiding predators that were chasing them. These tails do not regrow past 80% the original length after autotomy.

Sand lizards are a frequent carrier of common ticks which are a great risk to the health of the lizards, especially males during breeding seasons when they have great mobility. Males with larger home territory ranges were also subject to carrying even greater loads of parasites. Trematodes, metacercariae, cestode larva, nematodes, nematode larvae and acarines are all examples of parasites that inhabit the alimentary tract of this lizard.

=== Competitive behaviour ===
Male sand lizards are polygynous and compete with each other for female mates through incredibly aggressive manners. Sand lizard copulation is a process that lasts 2–4 minutes and after it is completed, the males will guard the individual female for hours or up to several days to protect them. After this time period, they will continue their search for new mates.

When male sand lizards compete over females, they perform ritualistic displays that often escalate into aggressive behaviors and actual combat. Males raise themselves up on all four limbs and turn over to intimidate their opponents, one may back down at this stage but if not, the two can begin fighting actual combat. They mainly attack through biting each other and aim at the heads or other vulnerable spots. Occasionally, even extremely deep cuts into jaw muscles and tissues were observed. Generally, equally sized males will have longer fights than two males with differing sizes; however, males fighting intruders in their own areas of residence did not win significantly more than intruders.

If male sand lizards engage in a fight with another multiple times, they will consider them a rival. However, subsequent aggressive interactions beyond the first one tend to be much shorter on average than the first encounter between the two. This is most likely because they are able to individually recognize others and the result of the fight between two rivals will most likely be similar to the first, so they are able to predict the outcome and end their battle early.

Sand lizard mating seasons are very short, lasting only 17 days of the entire year. Generally males are only able to mate with an absolute maximum of six different females during this time period and because a single mating guarding session can take up to 18% of the entire mating season.

Because of this, a several day time commitment means the investment male sand lizards put into mating is incredibly high and as a result males can begin to develop selective preferences for certain females. Because female sand lizards are often found close together in groups, males have more choices and opportunities to choose a mate depending on their individual characteristics.

== Conservation status ==
This lizard is regarded as threatened and is strictly protected under UK law – as it is throughout most of Europe. This is in contrast to L. a. exigua, whose Russian name translates as the "common lizard". The UK Amphibian and Reptile Conservation Trust coordinates conservation action for the sand lizard, including a successful captive-breeding and reintroduction programme.

The sand lizard is facing multiple threats throughout its range, including habitat destruction, habitat degradation, habitat fragmentation, lack of habitat management, climate change and inappropriate habitat management. Although the sand lizard is under strict protection in the UK, there are still actions needed to be taken, including habitat protection, habitat management, species protection, species management, distribution surveys, population and conservation status monitoring, scientific research, and public awareness.

Efforts in the UK have been made to protect and conserve their habitats because the sand lizard is one of only six reptile species found in Britain. Lizard populations were analyzed and their habitats were studied and specific recommendations were made for maintaining the quality of the environments so sand lizards can continue to inhabit those regions.

In Sweden, the sand lizard is also considered threatened and is managed by a national protection plan. Populations are highly fragmented. This is thought to have led to an increase in inbreeding and low genetic diversity; as of 2017, the Swedish sand lizard populations decreasing by around 20-40% in the previous approximately 20 years. Swedish sand lizards are generally found around the coast where sparsely vegetative habitats are more common. However, there are also populations as far north as Värmlands and Dalarna; despite the species' name sand, does not always appear to be a requirement for populations.

== Gallery ==
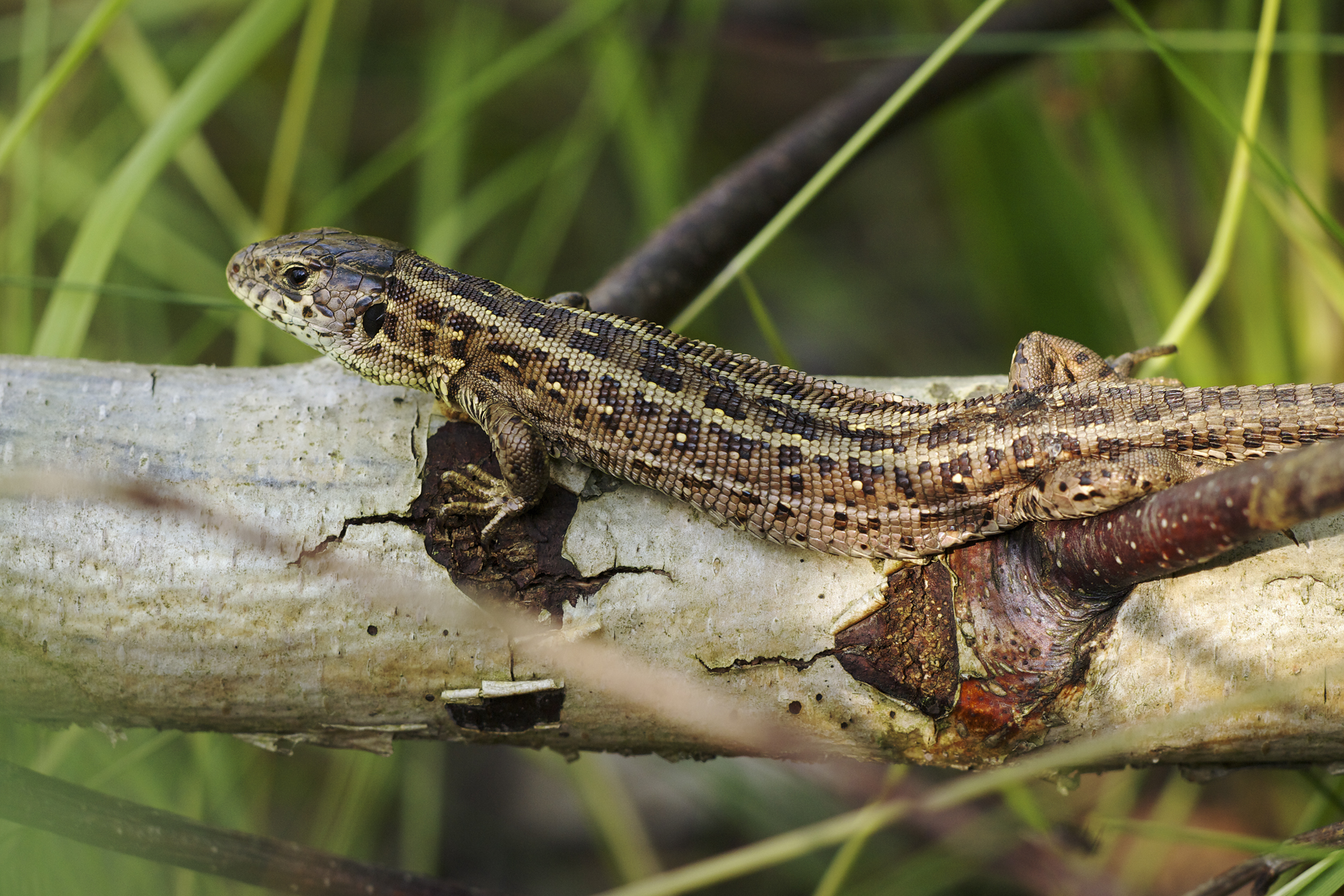
Sand lizard

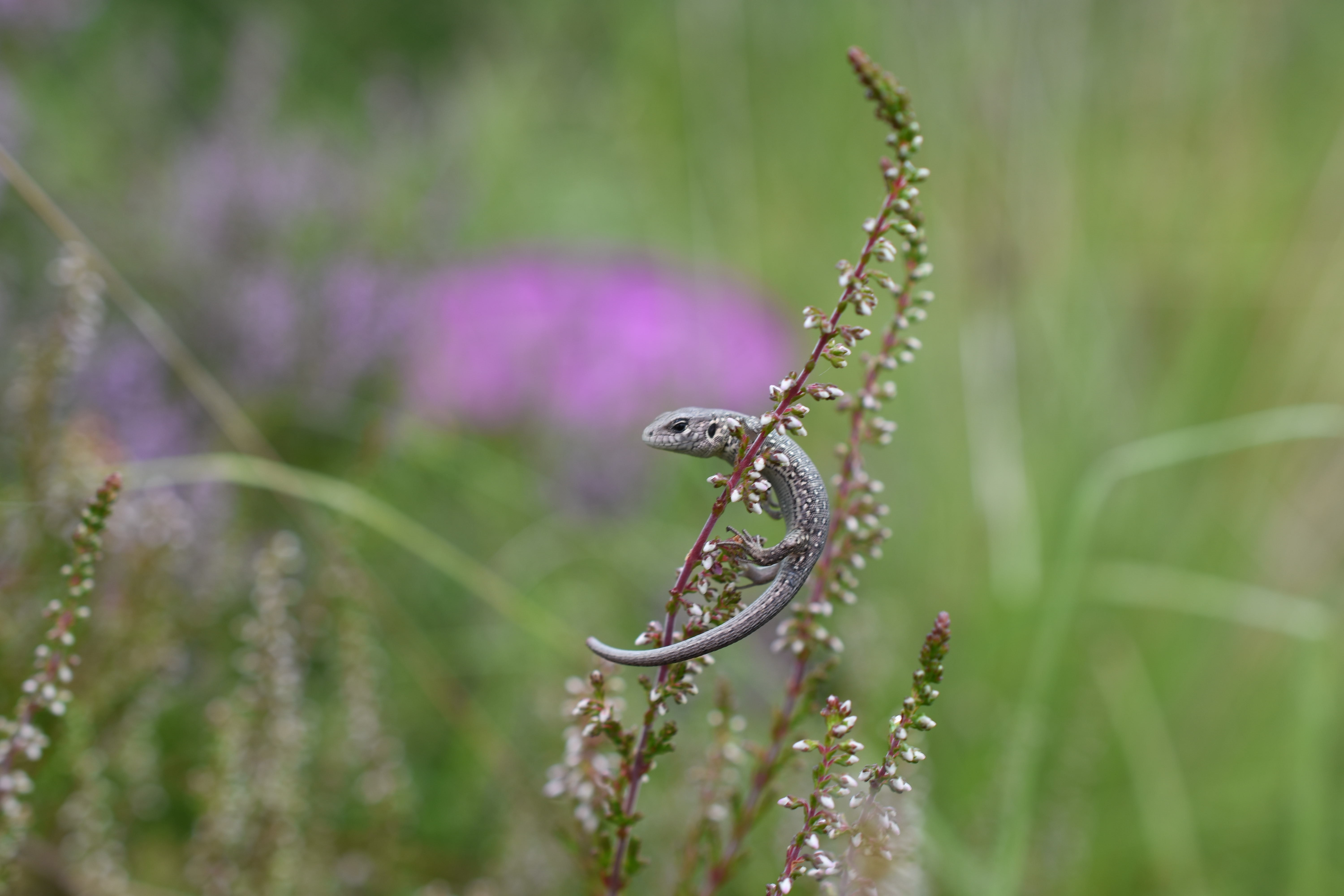
Hatchling on a flower

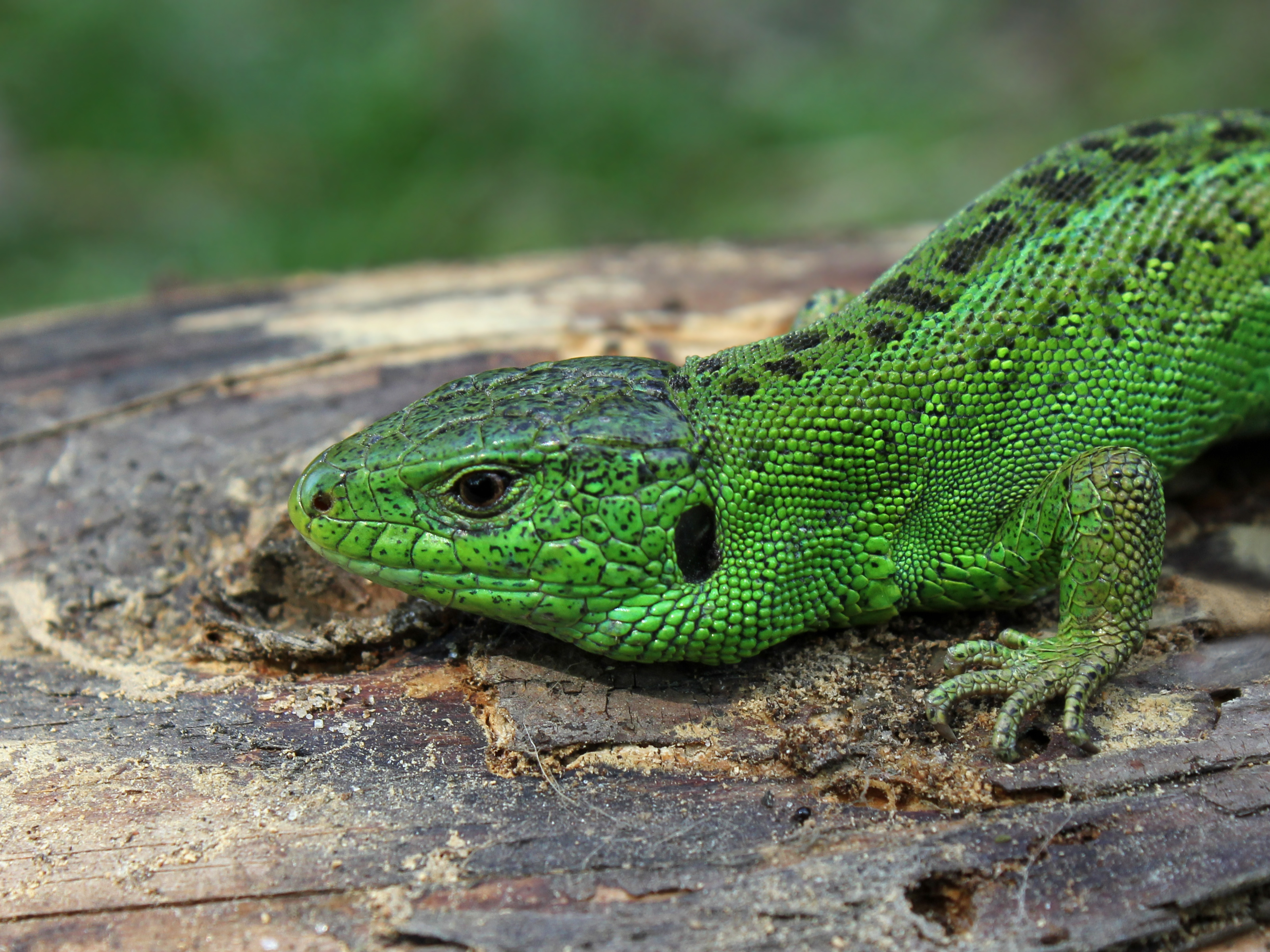
Sand lizard, mating season colouring

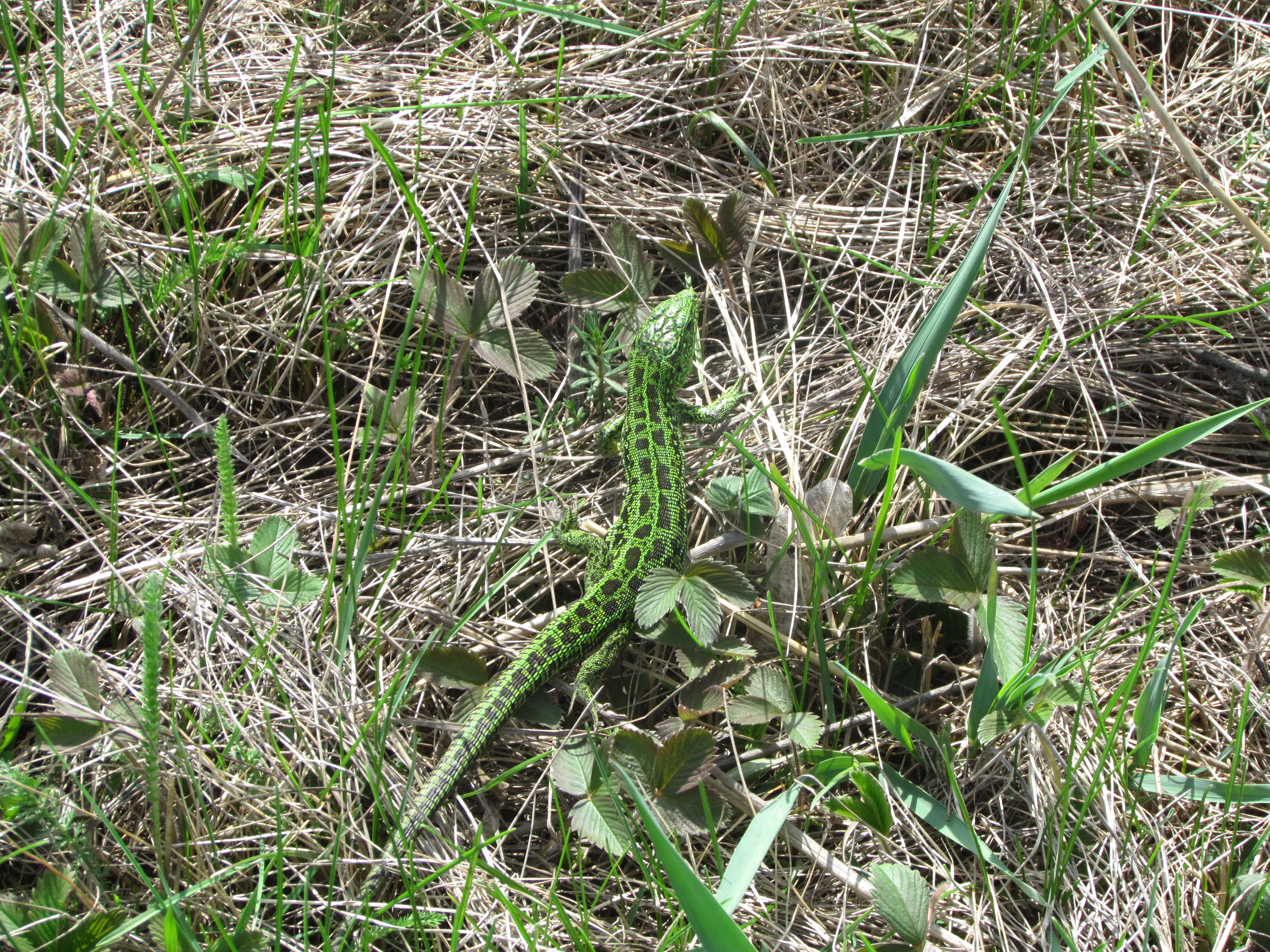
Penza Oblast, Russia

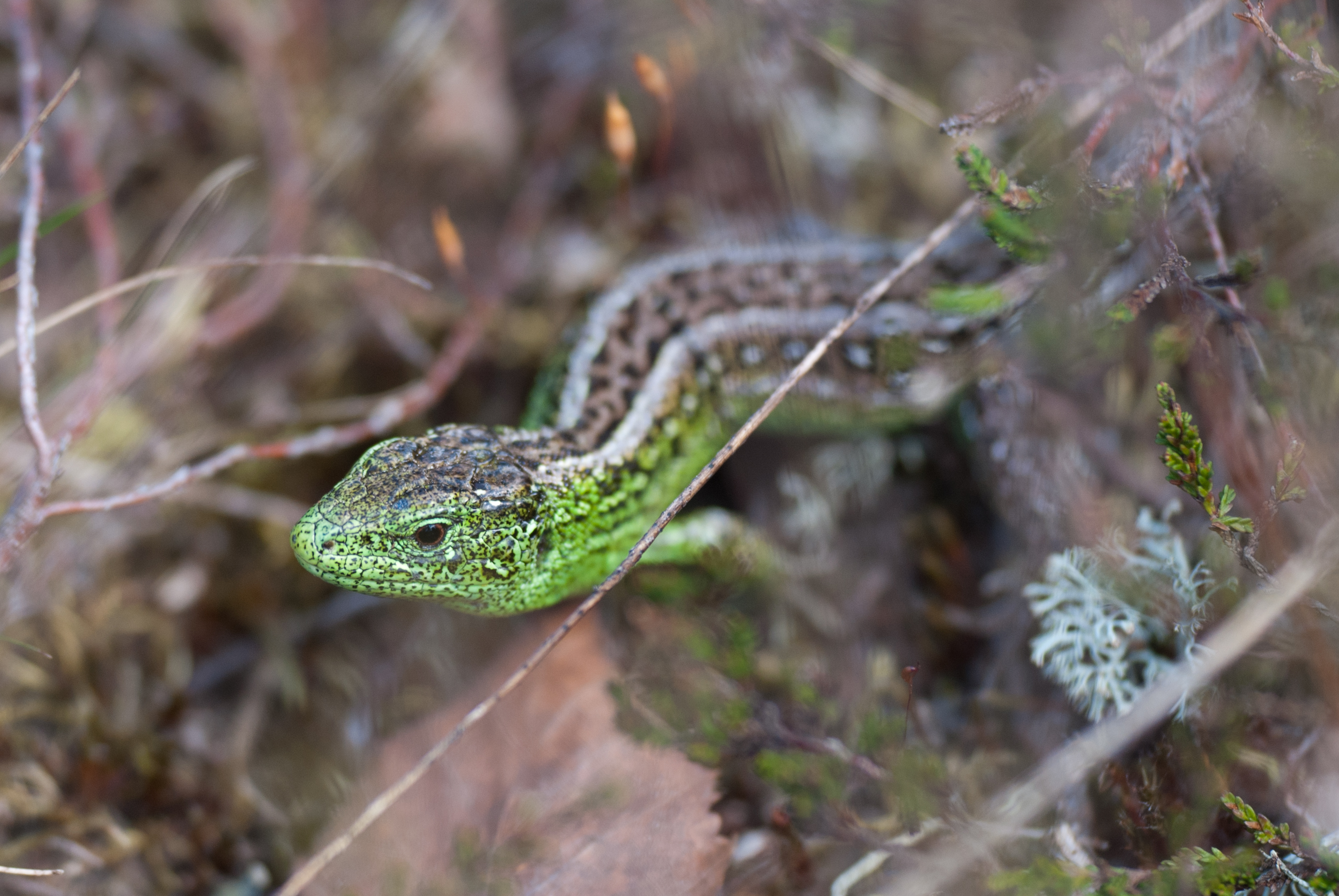
Sand lizard at Jussi heat in Põhja-Kõrvemaa Nature Reserve

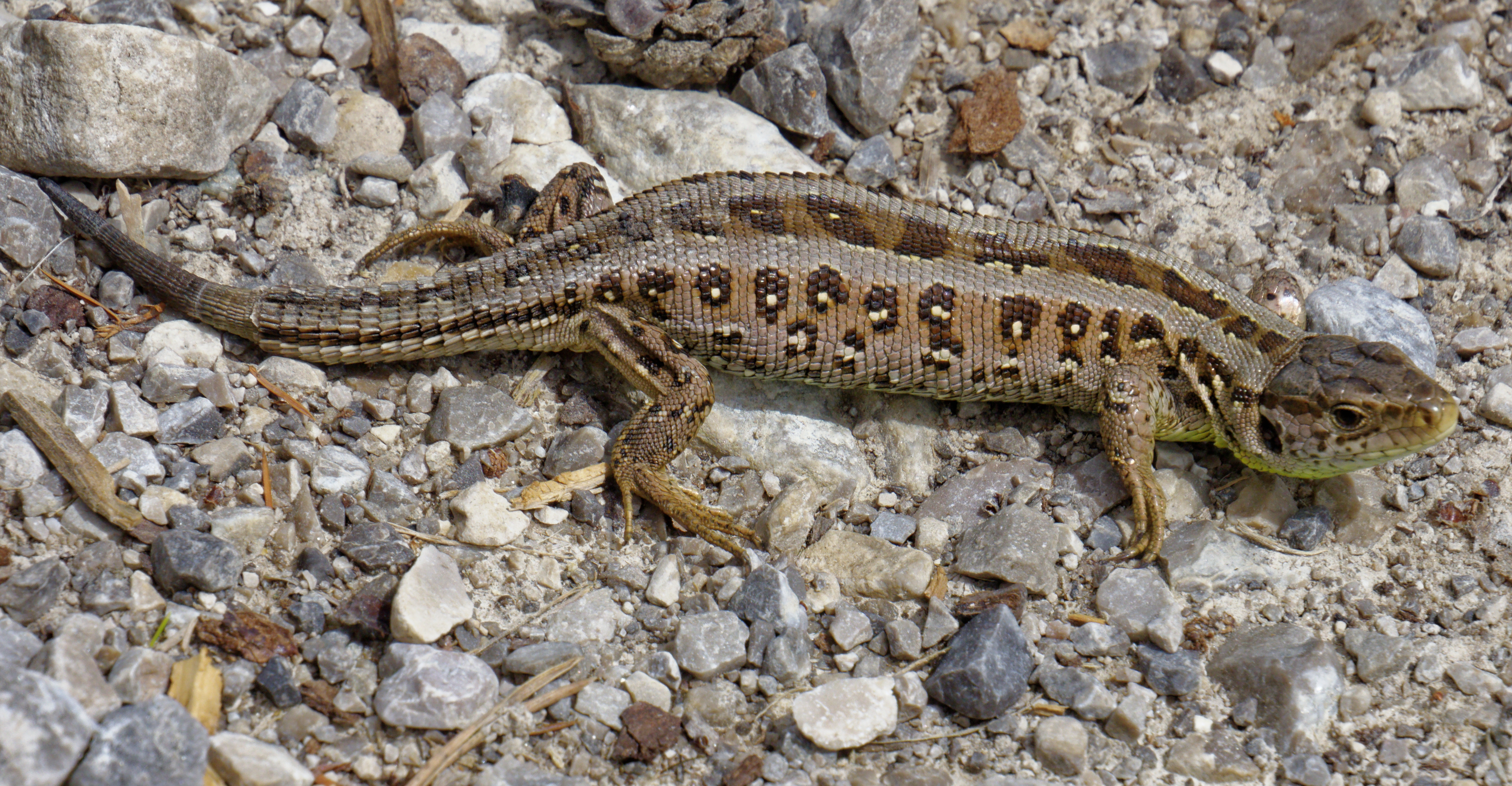

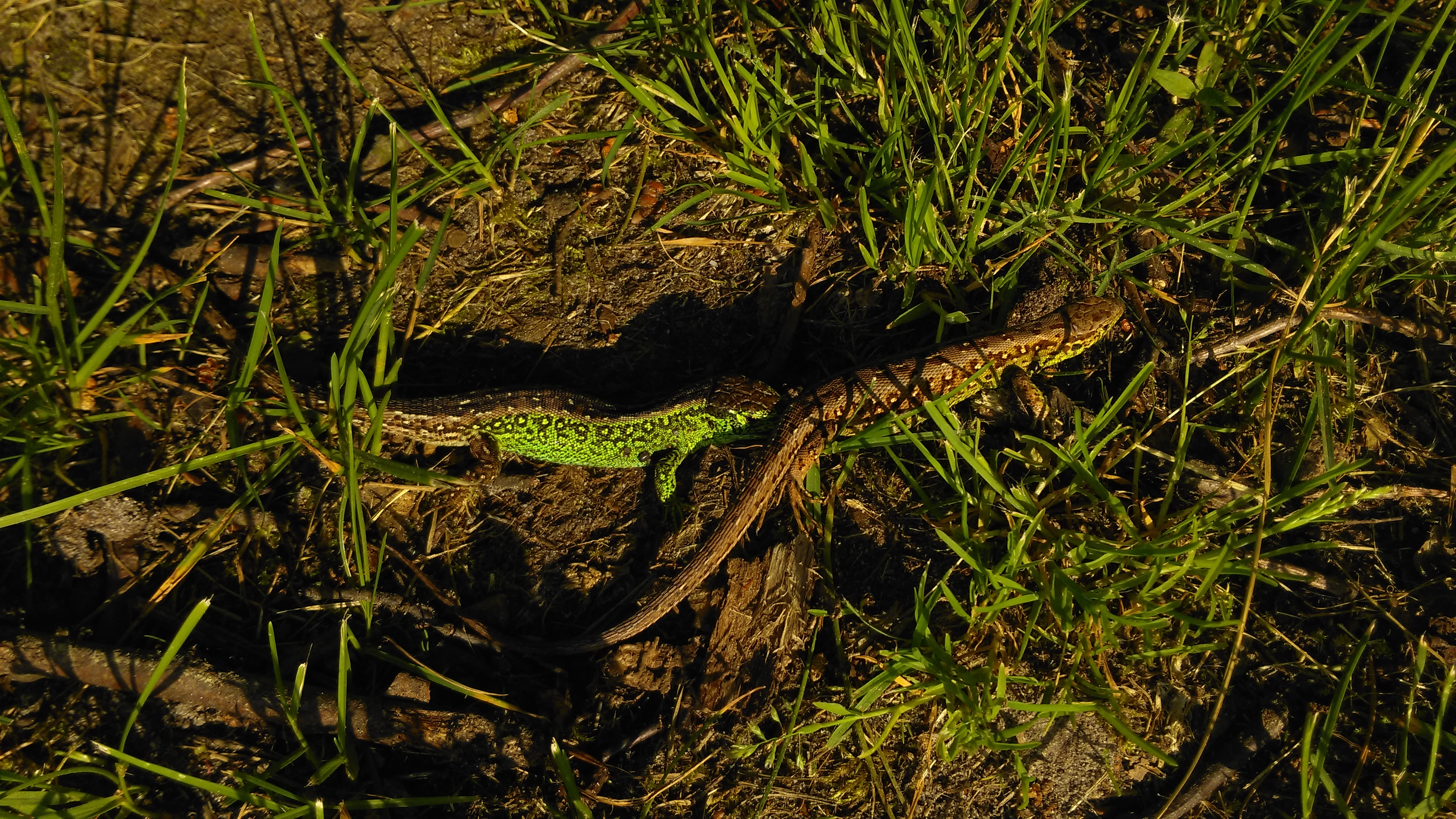
Male and female in Poland

== See also ==
- Hesketh Golf Links, a Site of Special Scientific Interest (UK protected land), a UK habitat where sand lizards exist
- List of reptiles of Great Britain
- List of reptiles of Italy
