= William Dale Archerd =

American serial killer

- Archerd in court in February 1968
- Born: William Dale Archerd; May 5, 1912; Dardanelle, Arkansas, U.S.
- Died: October 29, 1977 (aged 65); Vacaville, California, U.S.
- Other name: James Lynn Arden
- Conviction: First degree murder (3 counts)
- Penalty: Death; commuted to life imprisonment

Details
- Victims: 3–6
- Span of crimes: 1947–1966
- Country: United States
- States: California; Nevada
- Date apprehended: July 27, 1967

William Dale Archerd (May 5, 1912 – October 29, 1977) was an American serial killer who killed at least three people with insulin injections between 1956 and 1966 in Northern California. He was the first to be convicted of using insulin as a murder weapon in the US, and he is suspected in three more cases.

== Life ==
Archerd was always interested in medicine but had neither the discipline nor the money to pursue his interest. In 1940 and 1941, he worked as an assistant at the Camarillo State Mental Hospital in wards where patients were treated with insulin shock therapies.

In 1950, he was sentenced to five years of probation for possession of morphine in San Francisco. After another conviction, this parole was revoked. After escaping from a minimum-security prison in Chino, he was rearrested, put in San Quentin Prison, and released again in 1953 on probation.

His home was in the Alhambra region of the San Gabriel Valley in Los Angeles County, California.

== Arrest and conviction ==
Archerd was arrested on July 27, 1967, in Los Angeles for a threefold murder. He was convicted of killing the following: Zella Archerd, his fourth wife (July 25, 1956, two months after their wedding); Burney Archerd, his nephew (September 2, 1961, in Long Beach); and Mary Brinker Post, his seventh wife (November 3, 1966).

Others suspected to be victims of Archerd are: William Jones Jr. (October 12, 1947, in Fontana), Juanita Plum Archerd, his fifth wife (March 13, 1958, in Las Vegas); and Frank Stewart (March 17, 1960).

All exhibited symptoms of hypoglycemia.

Archerd was sentenced to death on March 6, 1968, for three of the murder cases. The medical personnel, law enforcement, and prosecution team were unaware of the availability of an accurate and sensitive assay for blood insulin levels developed years earlier by Rosalyn Yalow in collaboration with Solomon Berson working at the Bronx Veterans Administration Hospital. Instead, they presented some unproven laboratory evidence that, in retrospect, should not have been accepted in court.

In December 1970, the death sentence was upheld by the California Supreme Court. In 1972, the sentence was instead changed to life imprisonment after a ruling by the United States Supreme Court. Archerd died of pneumonia in 1977 at the age of 65.

== See also ==
- List of serial killers in the United States
