= Dardanelle, Arkansas =

- City
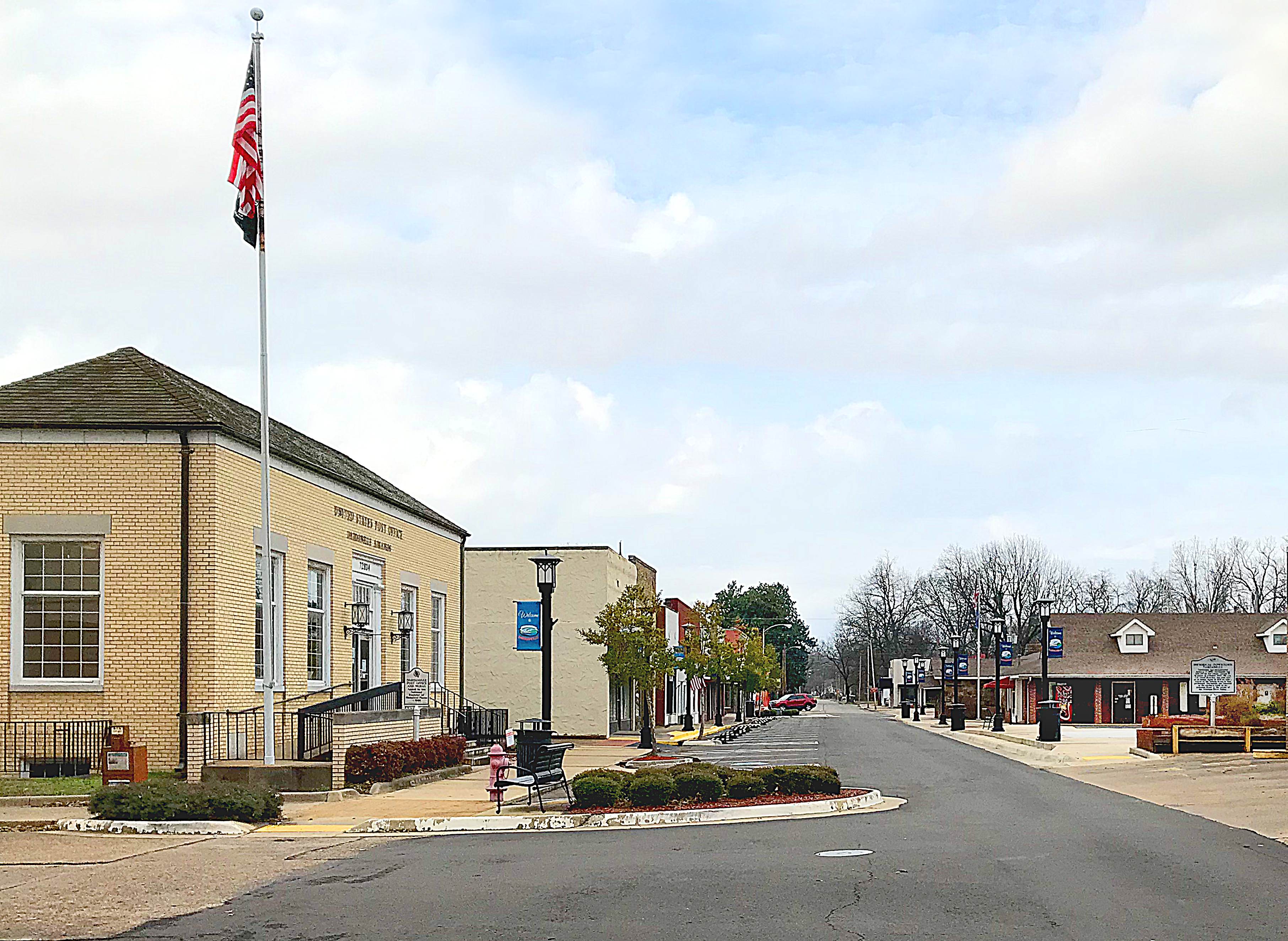
- Front St., Downtown Dardanelle. January 2020
- Motto: "Where history & hospitality reside"
- Location of Dardanelle in Yell County, Arkansas
- Coordinates: 35°14′21″N 93°10′37″W
- Country: United States
- State: Arkansas
- County: Yell

Area
  - Total: 3.64 sq mi (9.44 km^{2})
  - Land: 3.64 sq mi (9.44 km^{2})
  - Water: 0 sq mi (0.00 km^{2})
- Elevation: 328 ft (100 m)

Population (2020)
  - Total: 4,517
  - Estimate (2025): 4,521 ▲
  - Density: 1,239.5/sq mi (478.56/km^{2})
- Time zone: UTC-6 (Central (CST))
  - Summer (DST): UTC-5 (CDT)
- ZIP code: 72834
- Area code: 479
- GNIS feature ID: 2404187
- FIPS code: 05-17380
- Website: City of Dardanelle Arkansas

Dardanelle is a city in northeast Yell County, Arkansas, United States. Its population was 4,517 at the 2020 census. Along with Danville, it serves as a county seat for Yell County. It is located near Lake Dardanelle. Dardanelle is part of the Russellville micropolitan statistical area.

== History ==
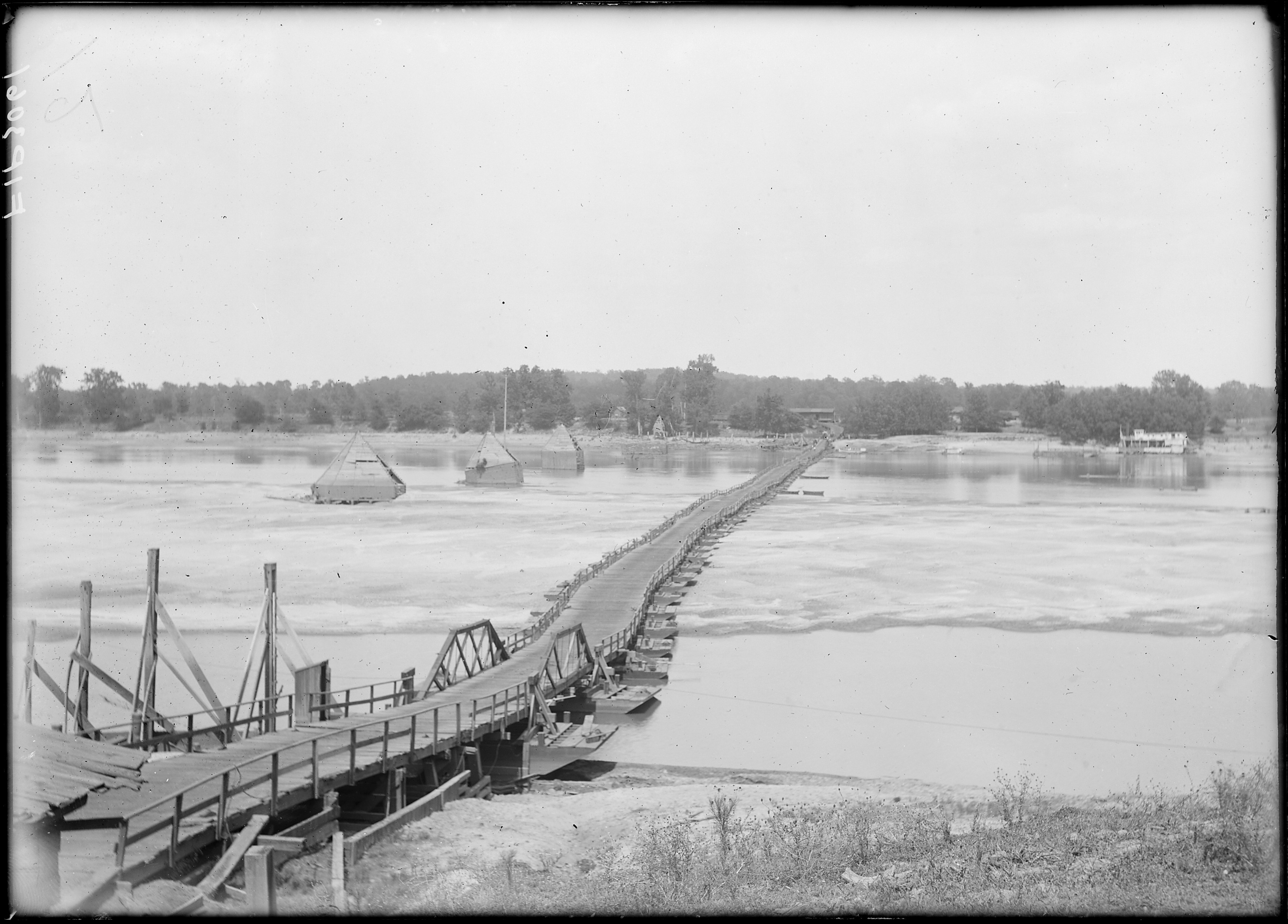
For nearly four decades (1891-1929), the bridge between Yell and Pope Counties at the old military road crossing at Dardanelle was the longest pontoon bridge in the U.S. at over 2,200 feet.

Dardanelle is one of the oldest cities in Arkansas. Officially incorporated in 1855, Dardanelle celebrated its 150th anniversary in 2005. The area had been settled for years before that, though, first being established as a river town in the mid-18th century. It is Yell County's dual county seat, sharing that title with Danville.

On June 24, 1823, Acting Governor Robert Crittenden of Arkansas Territory met with a group of Arkansas Cherokee leaders, including John Jolly and Black Fox, at a location traditionally associated with the Council Oaks in present-day Dardanelle. Although the meeting later became known as the “Treaty of Council Oaks,” no treaty was actually negotiated or signed. The participants discussed disputes over Cherokee reservation boundaries and Cherokee settlement south of the Arkansas River. The meeting resolved neither issue, and the Arkansas Cherokee did not cede their Arkansas lands to the United States until 1828.

The Council Oak trees were a pair of huge oaks (102 feet tall and 400–500 years old). One of the trees was destroyed in a flood in the early 1990s, but the other is still standing. The site is now a city park.

Because of its location on the banks of the Arkansas River, Dardanelle was one of Arkansas's leading towns in the 19th century. Hundreds of barges, steamboats, and other vessels traveled by the town annually. Roughly halfway between the state's two largest cities of Little Rock and Fort Smith, Dardanelle was a transportation and business hub, known as a marketplace for gin, rum, and cotton.

Dardanelle has a history of being one of the state's leading immigration centers, a legacy that continues to this day. Vast numbers of Czech and German families, including the Ballouns, Vodrazkas, Staneks, and Pfeiffers, came to the town in the late 18th and early 19th centuries, and their impact can still be felt. As of 2010, Dardanelle has one of the highest percentages of Hispanics in the state, with over 36% of the town's population Hispanic (up from 21% in 2000).

Merritt Park opened in the late 1990s on the west side of town. It is a large, state-of-the-art park featuring outstanding baseball facilities, a playground, soccer fields, basketball courts, and a walking/jogging trail. The adjacent Dardanelle Community Center opened around the same time and provides several services for the community.

In the late 19th century, a pontoon bridge between Dardanelle and Russellville replaced ferry service. Spanning 2,208 feet, it was the longest pontoon bridge ever constructed across a moving body of water. The bridge was completely washed out a few times during its nearly 40 years of existence.

The Dardanelle Lock and Dam, constructed in the 1960s as part of the McClellan-Kerr Navigation System, led to the formation of Lake Dardanelle. It is a source of hydropower and helps regulate river traffic on the Arkansas River. In 2013, it had an operating budget of just over $8.9 million.

During the 2019 Arkansas River floods, a levee just south of Dardanelle near Holla Bend failed and broke at 1:00 am on May 31. Over the next few days, water came perilously close to homes, schools, and businesses in the southern part of Dardanelle, but receded before causing any major damage.

== Geography ==
According to the United States Census Bureau, the city has a total area of 3.1 sq mi (8.0 km^{2}), all land.

=== Climate ===
Climate data for Dardanelle, Arkansas (1991–2020 normals, extremes 1909–present)
Month	Jan	Feb	Mar	Apr	May	Jun	Jul	Aug	Sep	Oct	Nov	Dec	Year
Record high °F (°C)	82 (28)	87 (31)	95 (35)	100 (38)	100 (38)	108 (42)	110 (43)	113 (45)	108 (42)	99 (37)	88 (31)	81 (27)	113 (45)
Mean maximum °F (°C)	70.4 (21.3)	73.9 (23.3)	81.6 (27.6)	85.6 (29.8)	90.3 (32.4)	95.0 (35.0)	99.6 (37.6)	100.4 (38.0)	95.4 (35.2)	88.2 (31.2)	78.2 (25.7)	71.1 (21.7)	101.4 (38.6)
Mean daily maximum °F (°C)	51.1 (10.6)	56.4 (13.6)	65.2 (18.4)	74.2 (23.4)	81.3 (27.4)	89.0 (31.7)	93.4 (34.1)	93.1 (33.9)	86.5 (30.3)	76.0 (24.4)	62.4 (16.9)	53.0 (11.7)	73.5 (23.1)
Daily mean °F (°C)	40.1 (4.5)	44.4 (6.9)	52.8 (11.6)	61.6 (16.4)	70.1 (21.2)	78.2 (25.7)	82.1 (27.8)	81.2 (27.3)	74.2 (23.4)	63.2 (17.3)	50.8 (10.4)	42.6 (5.9)	61.8 (16.6)
Mean daily minimum °F (°C)	29.1 (−1.6)	32.5 (0.3)	40.3 (4.6)	49.0 (9.4)	59.0 (15.0)	67.3 (19.6)	70.8 (21.6)	69.3 (20.7)	61.8 (16.6)	50.3 (10.2)	39.2 (4.0)	32.1 (0.1)	50.1 (10.1)
Mean minimum °F (°C)	13.9 (−10.1)	18.0 (−7.8)	23.3 (−4.8)	32.2 (0.1)	43.0 (6.1)	56.6 (13.7)	61.8 (16.6)	59.4 (15.2)	46.4 (8.0)	33.0 (0.6)	23.3 (−4.8)	17.3 (−8.2)	11.1 (−11.6)
Record low °F (°C)	−11 (−24)	−14 (−26)	9 (−13)	24 (−4)	34 (1)	47 (8)	49 (9)	47 (8)	32 (0)	23 (−5)	14 (−10)	−3 (−19)	−14 (−26)
Average precipitation inches (mm)	3.56 (90)	3.34 (85)	4.58 (116)	5.15 (131)	5.44 (138)	3.65 (93)	3.62 (92)	3.35 (85)	3.53 (90)	4.00 (102)	4.79 (122)	4.52 (115)	49.53 (1,258)
Average snowfall inches (cm)	0.8 (2.0)	1.2 (3.0)	0.7 (1.8)	0.0 (0.0)	0.0 (0.0)	0.0 (0.0)	0.0 (0.0)	0.0 (0.0)	0.0 (0.0)	0.0 (0.0)	0.0 (0.0)	0.4 (1.0)	3.1 (7.9)
Average precipitation days (≥ 0.01 in)	6.5	6.3	7.7	6.9	8.3	6.0	5.8	5.2	5.1	6.0	6.5	6.4	76.7
Average snowy days (≥ 0.1 in)	0.4	0.6	0.2	0.0	0.0	0.0	0.0	0.0	0.0	0.0	0.0	0.4	1.6
Source: NOAA

== Demographics ==
Historical population
Census	Pop.	Note	%±
1860	299		—
1870	926		209.7%
1880	748		−19.2%
1890	1,456		94.7%
1900	1,602		10.0%
1910	1,757		9.7%
1920	1,835		4.4%
1930	1,832		−0.2%
1940	1,807		−1.4%
1950	1,772		−1.9%
1960	2,098		18.4%
1970	3,297		57.1%
1980	3,621		9.8%
1990	3,722		2.8%
2000	4,228		13.6%
2010	4,745		12.2%
2020	4,517		−4.8%
2025 (est.)	4,521	▲	0.1%
U.S. Decennial Census; 2014 Estimate

=== 2020 census ===
Dardanelle racial composition
Race	Number	Percentage
White (non-Hispanic)	2,368	52.42%
Black or African American (non-Hispanic)	147	3.25%
Native American	24	0.53%
Asian	20	0.44%
Pacific Islander	2	0.04%
Other or multiracial	179	3.96%
Hispanic or Latino	1,777	39.34%

As of the 2020 census, Dardanelle had a population of 4,517. There were 1,677 households, including 1,066 families. The median age was 35.4 years; 26.4% of residents were under age 18 and 16.2% were age 65 or older. For every 100 females, there were 92.3 males, and for every 100 females age 18 and over, there were 87.4 males age 18 and over.

85.6% of residents lived in urban areas, while 14.4% lived in rural areas.

Among households, 37.0% had children under age 18 living in them. Among all households, 40.5% were married-couple households, 18.4% had a male householder with no spouse or partner present, and 32.9% had a female householder with no spouse or partner present. About 28.9% of households were made up of individuals, and 13.7% had someone living alone who was age 65 or older.

There were 1,812 housing units, of which 7.5% were vacant. The homeowner vacancy rate was 1.7%, and the rental vacancy rate was 9.9%.

=== 2010 census ===
According to 2010 Census, the population of the area was 4,745 people. From 2000 to 2010, the Dardanelle city population growth percentage was 12.2% (or from 4,228 people to 4,745 people); 28.7% of the Dardanelle city residents were under 18. Racial data for the city of Dardanelle include 57.9% non-Latino White, 3.6% African American, 0.5% Asian, and 36.1% Hispanic, with 1,346 of 1,745 Latino residents of Mexican descent.

Also, of the 1,877 housing units in Dardanelle, 89.5% were occupied, with just over 50% of those occupied units being owner-occupied. Of the 1,680 households, 39.7% had children under 18 living with them, 42.4% were married couples living together, 15.8% had a female householder with no husband present, and 33.6% were not families. About 29.2% of all households were made up of individuals, and 27.6% had someone living alone who was 65 or older. The average household size was 2.74 and the average family size was 3.33.

=== 2000 census ===
As of the 2000 census, 4,228 people, 1,605 households, and 1,078 families lived in the city. The population density was 1,382.0 inhabitants per square mile (533.6/km^{2}). The 1,747 housing units had an average density of 571.0 per square mile (220.5/km^{2}). The racial makeup of the city was 75.24% White, 4.64% African American, 0.54% Native American, 0.43% Asian, 0.09% Pacific Islander, 16.65% from other races, and 2.41% from two or more races. About 21.48% of the population were Hispanics or Latinos of any race.

In the city, the age distribution was 25.4% under 18, 9.9% aged 18 to 24, 28.5% aged 25 to 44, 19.7% aged 45 to 64, and 16.5% aged 65 or older. The median age was 35 years. For every 100 females, there were 92.7 males. For every 100 females 18 and over, there were 86.6 males.

The median income for a household in the city was $25,727, and for a family was $30,457. Males had a median income of $21,138 versus $17,370 for females. The per capita income for the city was $14,583. About 14.9% of families and 19.6% of the population were below the poverty line, including 26.5% of those under age 18 and 14.0% of those age 65 or over.

== Economy ==
Some of Dardanelle's larger employers include Tyson Foods, Walmart Supercenter, the Dardanelle Nursing and Rehabilitation Center, Dardanelle School System, Dardanelle City government, and Chambers Bank, which acquired River Town Bank (formerly the Bank of Dardanelle) in 2019.

Dardanelle is home to the Dardanelle Post-Dispatch. Established in 1853, the newspaper claims to be Arkansas's oldest weekly newspaper.

== Arts and culture ==
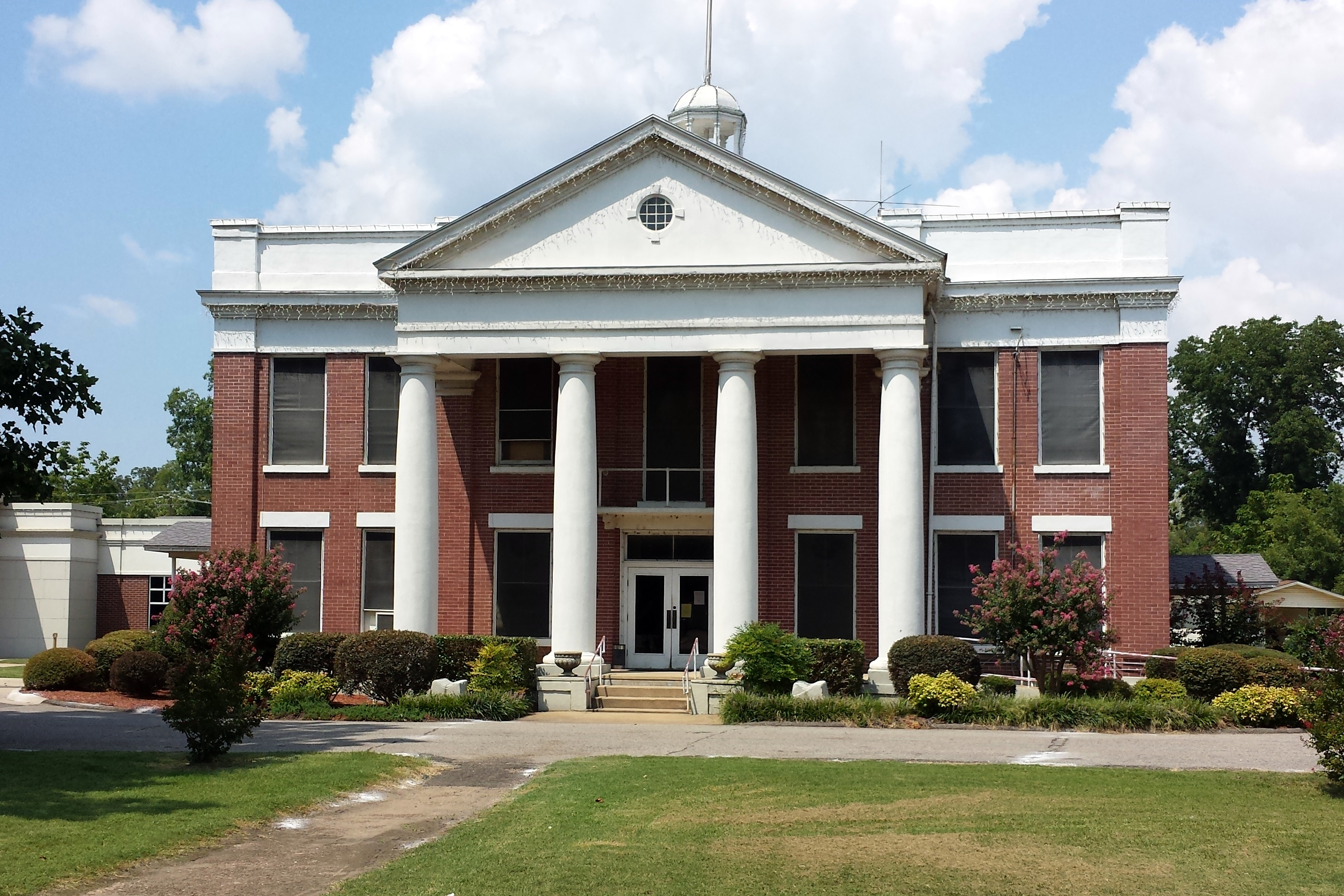
Yell County Courthouse in downtown Dardanelle

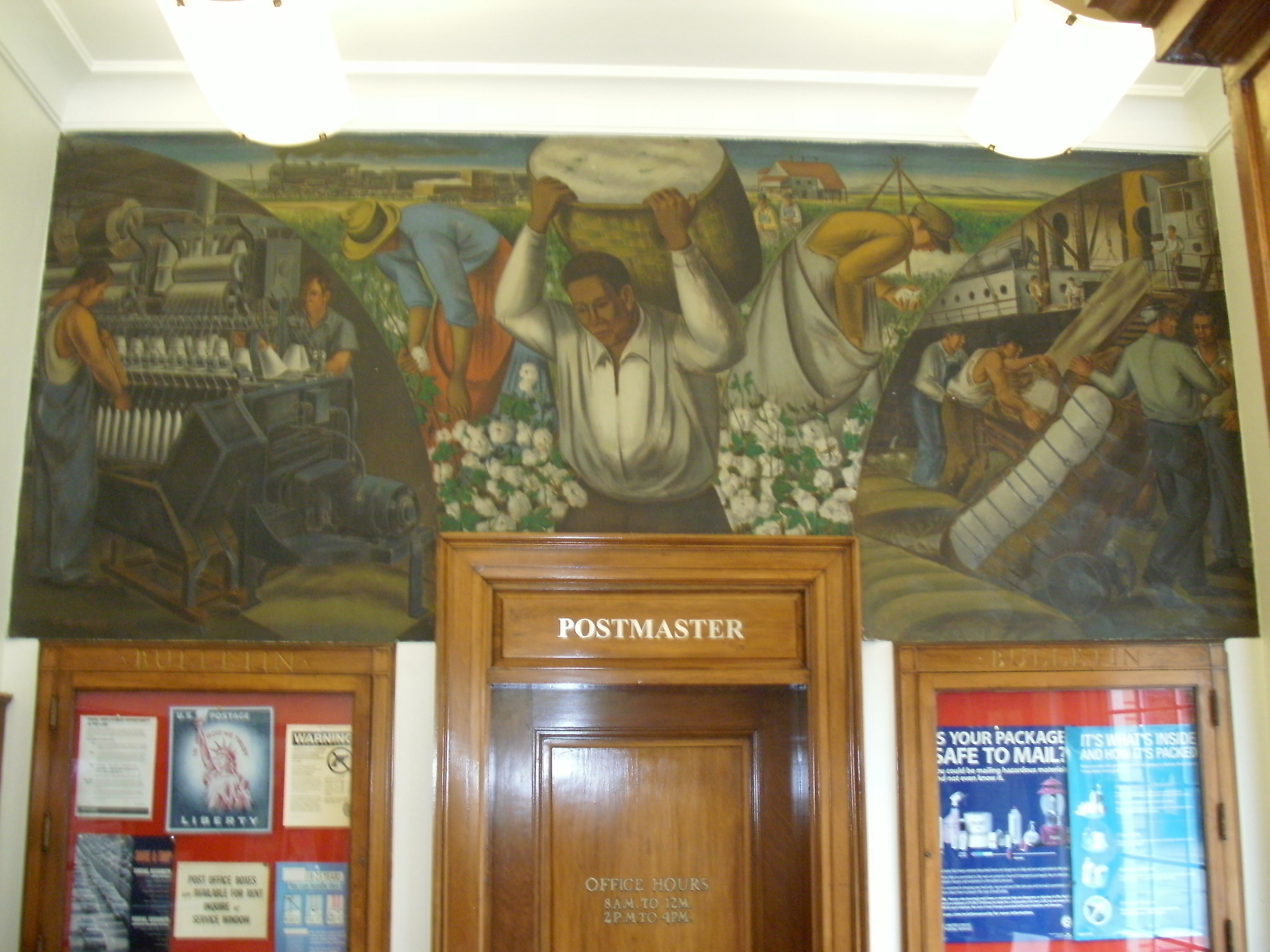
An oil-on-canvas mural, Cotton Growing, Manufacture, and Export, painted in 1939 by Ludwig Mactarian is on display in the Dardanelle post office.

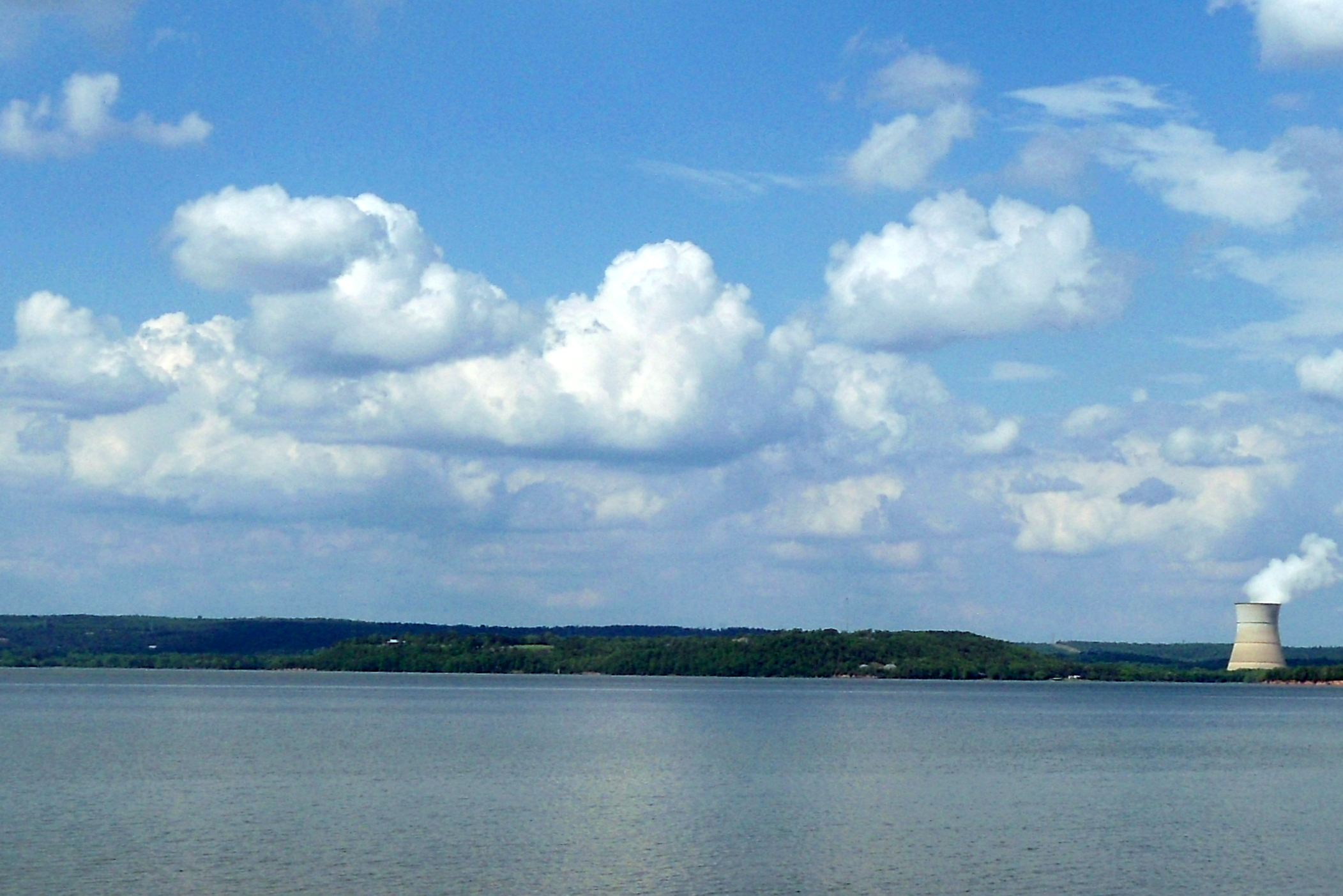
View of Lake Dardanelle, with reactor at Arkansas Nuclear One visible in background

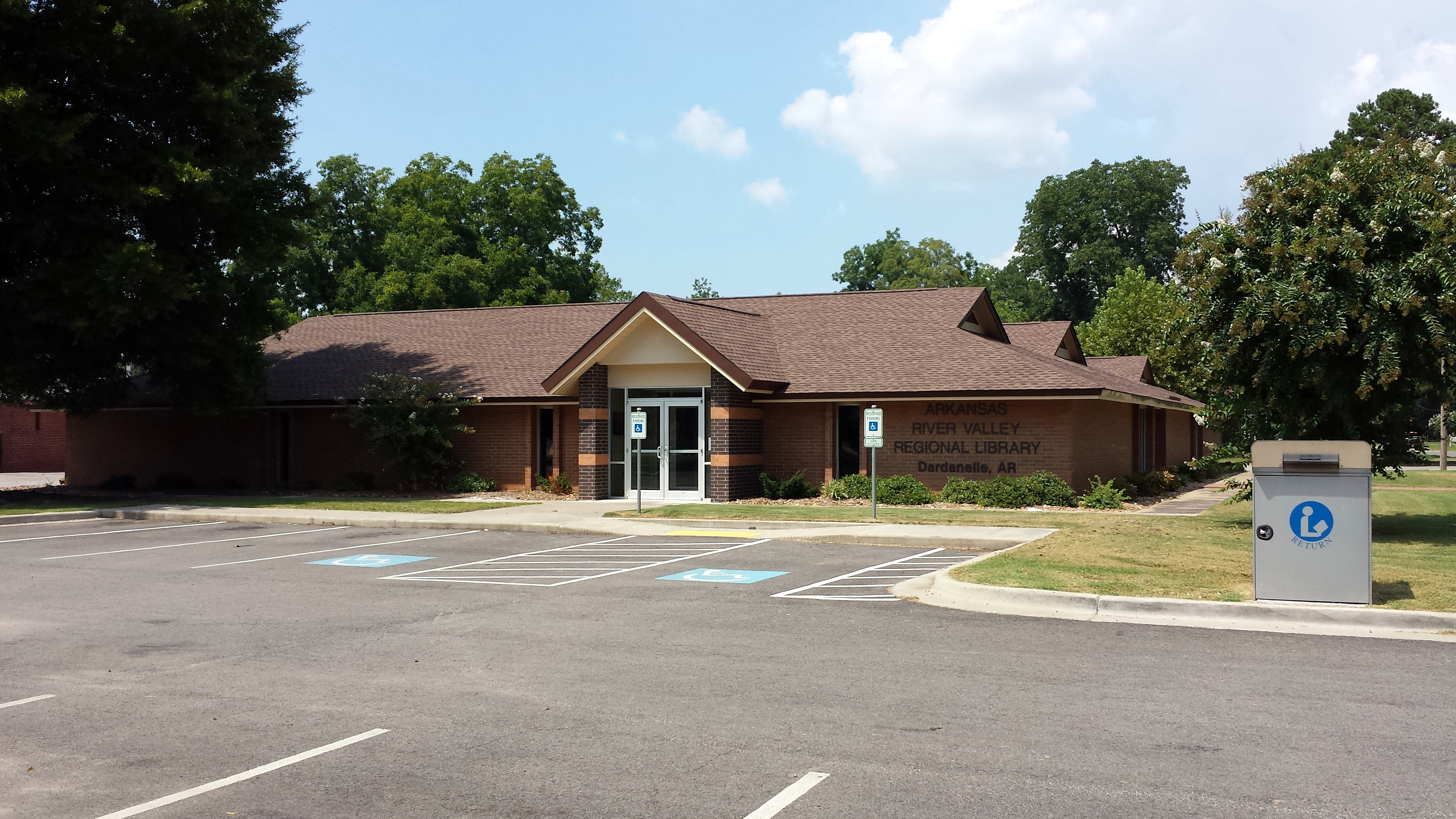
Arkansas River Valley Regional Library in Dardanelle

=== Points of interest ===
A number of attractions can be found in Dardanelle or its surrounding area, including:

- Yell County Courthouse (on the National Register of Historic Places)
- Dardanelle Agriculture and Post Office
- Dardanelle Rock
- Highway 22, designated "True Grit Trail" by Governor Asa Hutchinson on March 20, 2019, is located at the western edge of Dardanelle.

== Parks and recreation ==
- Lake Dardanelle
- Mount Nebo and Mount Nebo State Park
- Holla Bend National Wildlife Refuge
- Dana Merritt Park
- Veterans' Memorial Riverfront Park
- Council Oaks Park and Historic Site

== Education ==
=== Public library ===
The Arkansas River Valley Regional Library system is based in Dardanelle and consists of one central library at 501 North Front Street and six branch libraries in other communities, providing area residents with access to print books, publications, and multimedia content.

=== Public education ===
Public elementary and secondary education are provided by Dardanelle School District that leads students to graduate at Dardanelle High School.

== Transportation ==
Highways 7, 22, 27, and 28 can be found ending in or going through Dardanelle. Dardanelle is halfway between the Buffalo River to the north and Hot Springs to the south on Scenic Byway 7.

Historically, the Dardanelle & Russellville Railroad was created largely for Dardanelle’s benefit. In the early 1880s, Dardanelle was an important cotton-shipping center, but the main Little Rock & Fort Smith railroad ran through Russellville on the north side of the Arkansas River. Dardanelle merchants needed a better way to get their freight to that main line. The railroad itself did not cross the Arkansas River into the city of Dardanelle. Instead, freight crossed from Dardanelle via ferry and, later, a pontoon bridge.

== Sports ==
- The Lion's Den Golf Course
- In 1924, Dardanelle hosted minor league baseball. The Dardanelle White Sox played as a member of the six-team, Class D level Western Arkansas League. Dardanelle was defeated by the Russellville Miners in the league finals.

== Notable people ==
- William Dale Archerd (1912–1977), a serial killer who killed at least three people with insulin in Northern California, was born in Dardanelle.
- Bonnie Brown (1938–2016), a member of the country music group the Browns, was born in Sparkman, Arkansas, but spent most of her adult life in Dardanelle.
- Jim R. Caldwell (born 1936), born in Dardanelle in 1936, was the first Republican to serve in the Arkansas State Senate in the 20th century.
- Johnny Carpenter (1914–2003), film actor, screenwriter, and producer
- Tom Cotton (born 1977), U.S. senator for Arkansas
- John Daly (born 1966), golfer, lived in Dardanelle as a child and currently owns a home near there.
- Gwendolyn Wilson Fowler (1907–1997), an African-American pharmacist, was the first Black woman licensed in Iowa; she was born in Dardanelle.
- Orval Lee Jaggers (1916–2004), Christian minister, writer, and scholar
- James Lee Witt (born 1944), former director of the Federal Emergency Management Agency

== See also ==
- True Grit - the setting for this novel is a farm in the Dardanelle area.
