= Steamboat House =

Steamboat House may refer to:

- Steamboat House (Dardanelle, Arkansas), listed on the National Register of Historic Places, in Yell County, Arkansas
- Steamboat House (New Iberia, Louisiana), listed on the National Register of Historic Places, in Iberia Parish, Louisiana
- Steamboat House (Huntsville, Texas) Recorded Texas Historic Landmark, residence where Sam Houston died
