= National Register of Historic Places listings in Yell County, Arkansas =

Location of Yell County in Arkansas

This is a list of the National Register of Historic Places listings in Yell County, Arkansas.

This is intended to be a complete list of the properties and districts on the National Register of Historic Places in Yell County, Arkansas, United States.

There are 30 properties and districts listed on the National Register in the county, and four former listings.

Contents: Counties in Arkansas
- Arkansas
- Ashley
- Baxter
- Benton
- Boone
- Bradley
- Calhoun
- Carroll
- Chicot
- Clark
- Clay
- Cleburne
- Cleveland
- Columbia
- Conway
- Craighead
- Crawford
- Crittenden
- Cross
- Dallas
- Desha
- Drew
- Faulkner
- Franklin
- Fulton
- Garland
- Grant
- Greene
- Hempstead
- Hot Spring
- Howard
- Independence
- Izard
- Jackson
- Jefferson
- Johnson
- Lafayette
- Lawrence
- Lee
- Lincoln
- Little River
- Logan
- Lonoke
- Madison
- Marion
- Miller
- Mississippi
- Monroe
- Montgomery
- Nevada
- Newton
- Ouachita
- Perry
- Phillips
- Pike
- Poinsett
- Polk
- Pope
- Prairie
- Pulaski (Little Rock)
- Randolph
- St. Francis
- Saline
- Scott
- Searcy
- Sebastian
- Sevier
- Sharp
- Stone
- Union
- Van Buren
- Washington
- White
- Woodruff
- Yell

This National Park Service list is complete through NPS recent listings posted July 17, 2026.

== Current listings ==
	Name on the Register	Image	Date listed	Location	City or town	Description
1	Archeological Site 3YE958		November 8, 2006 (#06000838)	Address Restricted	Dardanelle	
2	Brearley Cemetery Historic Section	Brearley Cemetery Historic Section	September 20, 2007 (#07000975)	Highway 27 approximately ½ mile west of Highway 22; 35°13′13″N 93°10′23″W	Dardanelle	
3	CCC Company 749 Powder Magazine	CCC Company 749 Powder Magazine	March 30, 2007 (#07000199)	North of Forest Service Road 4128 and south of Briggsville; 34°51′19″N 93°29′57″W	Briggsville	
4	Thomas James Cotton House	Thomas James Cotton House	May 10, 2001 (#01000483)	405 S. 3rd St. 35°13′12″N 93°09′21″W	Dardanelle	
5	Dardanelle Agriculture and Post Office	Dardanelle Agriculture and Post Office	August 14, 1998 (#98000919)	103 N. Front St. 35°13′14″N 93°08′50″W	Dardanelle	
6	Dardanelle Commercial Historic District	Dardanelle Commercial Historic District	January 28, 2009 (#08001039)	Roughly bounded by Front, Oak, 2nd, and Pine Sts. 35°13′11″N 93°09′13″W	Dardanelle	
7	Dardanelle Confederate Monument	Dardanelle Confederate Monument	April 26, 1996 (#96000456)	Southeastern corner of the courthouse lawn, near the junction of Union and Front Sts. 35°13′26″N 93°09′23″W	Dardanelle	
8	Evans-Neuhart House	Evans-Neuhart House	January 22, 2014 (#13001106)	320 E. 5th St. 34°59′27″N 93°17′31″W	Plainview	
9	First Presbyterian Church	First Presbyterian Church	July 9, 1987 (#87001156)	2nd and Quay Sts. 35°13′15″N 93°09′17″W	Dardanelle	
10	Dr. John Grace House and Hospital	Dr. John Grace House and Hospital	May 29, 2015 (#15000293)	100 North Rd. 35°06′23″N 93°28′11″W	Belleville	
11	Harris Creek Bridge		January 16, 2026 (#100012570)	Humpback Road over Harris Creek; 35°09′45″N 93°10′18″W	Dardanelle	
12	Kimball House	Kimball House	June 23, 1982 (#82002151)	713 N. Front St. 35°08′11″N 93°09′25″W	Dardanelle	
13	Methodist Episcopal Church, South	Methodist Episcopal Church, South	November 7, 1996 (#96001275)	Northeastern corner of the junction of Locust Dr. and 2nd St. 35°13′13″N 93°09′15″W	Dardanelle	
14	Mitchell House	Mitchell House	June 7, 1990 (#90000876)	Highway 80 west of Watson Branch; 34°59′04″N 93°36′58″W	Waltreak	
15	Mountain View Farm	Mountain View Farm	November 7, 1996 (#96001270)	County Road 218, approximately 0.75 miles south of Plainview; 34°58′38″N 93°17′45″W	Plainview	
16	Mt. Nebo State Park Cabins Historic District	Mt. Nebo State Park Cabins Historic District	September 21, 2016 (#16000655)	10006, 10105, 10115, and 10129 County Road 92, Mount Nebo State Park; 35°13′32″N 93°15′21″W	Dardanelle	
17	Mt. Nebo State Park Cabin No. 60	Mt. Nebo State Park Cabin No. 60	September 21, 2016 (#16000656)	10707 County Road 102, Mount Nebo State Park; 35°12′51″N 93°15′18″W	Dardanelle	
18	Mt. Nebo State Park Cabin No. 61	Mt. Nebo State Park Cabin No. 61	September 23, 2016 (#16000657)	10775 County Road 102, Mount Nebo State Park; 35°12′56″N 93°15′29″W	Dardanelle	
19	Mt. Nebo State Park Cabin No. 62	Mt. Nebo State Park Cabin No. 62	September 22, 2016 (#16000658)	10913 County Road 102, Mount Nebo State Park; 35°13′03″N 93°15′29″W	Dardanelle	
20	Mt. Nebo State Park Cabin No. 63	Mt. Nebo State Park Cabin No. 63	September 22, 2016 (#16000659)	10919 County Road 102, Mount Nebo State Park; 35°13′05″N 93°15′28″W	Dardanelle	
21	Mt. Nebo State Park Cabin No. 64	Mt. Nebo State Park Cabin No. 64	September 26, 2016 (#16000660)	10070 County Road 93, Mount Nebo State Park; 35°13′15″N 93°15′27″W	Dardanelle	
22	Mt. Nebo State Park Cabin No. 65	Mt. Nebo State Park Cabin No. 65	September 19, 2016 (#16000661)	10034 County Road 92, Mount Nebo State Park; 35°13′17″N 93°15′25″W	Dardanelle	
23	Mt. Nebo State Park-Pavilion	Mt. Nebo State Park-Pavilion	May 28, 1992 (#92000542)	North of Highway 155 in Mount Nebo State Park; 35°13′13″N 93°15′01″W	Dardanelle	
24	Old Arkansas 22-Dardanelle Segment	Old Arkansas 22-Dardanelle Segment	January 24, 2008 (#07001438)	County Road 906, ½ mile west of the junction of Highway 22 and County Road 51; 35°14′49″N 93°11′48″W	Dardanelle	
25	Spring Lake Bridge	Spring Lake Bridge	June 21, 1990 (#90000510)	Highway 307 over Bob Barnes Branch; 35°09′04″N 93°25′54″W	Belleville	
26	Spring Lake Recreation Area Historic District	Spring Lake Recreation Area Historic District	September 11, 1995 (#94001613)	Forest Service Rd. 1602 in the Ozark-St. Francis National Forest; 35°09′12″N 93°25′30″W	Stafford	
27	Steamboat House	Steamboat House	June 5, 1975 (#75000420)	601 N. Front St. 35°13′34″N 93°09′25″W	Dardanelle	
28	Sulphur Springs Cemetery	Sulphur Springs Cemetery	February 21, 2012 (#12000038)	Slo Fork Rd. 35°11′32″N 93°19′31″W	Sulphur Springs	
29	Ward's Crossing Bridge	Ward's Crossing Bridge	June 4, 2008 (#08000491)	County Road 8; 34°56′40″N 93°19′41″W	Plainview	Camelback through truss
30	Yell County Courthouse	Yell County Courthouse	September 8, 1992 (#92001176)	209 Union St. 35°13′26″N 93°09′23″W	Dardanelle	

== Former listings ==
	Name on the Register	Image	Date listed	Date removed	Location	City or town	Description
1	Achmun Creek Bridge		April 9, 1990 (#90000539)	August 11, 1999	Co. Rd. 222, over Achmun Creek	Ola	Replaced in 1989.
2	First Presbyterian Church-Berry House	First Presbyterian Church-Berry House	June 3, 1998 (#98000582)	January 2, 2024	203 Pecan St. 35°13′03″N 93°09′15″W	Dardanelle	
3	Mickles Bridge		August 16, 2007 (#07000437)	May 27, 2014	Spanning the Petit Jean River 0.25 miles north of Highway 10 and approximately 1 mile west of County Road 49; 35°04′27″N 93°17′51″W	Mickles	
4	Petit Jean River Bridge	Petit Jean River Bridge	January 21, 2010 (#09001263)	September 30, 2019	County Road 49 over the Petit Jean River; 35°04′37″N 93°14′29″W	Ola	

== See also ==
- List of National Historic Landmarks in Arkansas
- National Register of Historic Places listings in Arkansas
