= List of United States post office murals in Arkansas =

Following is a list of United States post office murals created in Arkansas between 1934 and 1943.

| Location | Mural title | Image | Artist | Date | Notes | NRHP listed |
|---|---|---|---|---|---|---|
| Benton | The Bauxite Mines | | Julius Woeltz | 1942 | currently located in the Saline County Courthouse in Benton, Arkansas | |
| Clarendon | They Cleared the Land and Planted Cotton | | Abraham Tobias | 1942 | never installed, current location unknown | |
| Clarksville | How Happy was the Occasion | | Mary M. Purser | 1941 | | |
| Dardanelle Agriculture and Post Office, in Dardanelle | Cotton Growing, Manufacture, and Export | | Ludwig Mactarian | 1939 | oil on canvas | |
| DeQueen | Wildlife Conservation in Arkansas | | Henry Simon | 1942 | | |
| DeWitt Post Office, in De Witt | Portrait of Contemporary De Witt | | William Thaher | 1941 | | |
| Lake Village Post Office, Lake Village | Lake Country Wild Life | | Avery F. Johnson | 1941 | | 1998 |
| Magnolia | Threshing | | Joe Jones | 1938 | | |
| Morrilton Post Office, in Morrilton | Men at Rest | | Richard Sargent | 1939 | on display at the Conway County Courthouse | 1998 |
| Nashville Post Office, Nashville | Peach Growing | | John Tazewell Robertson | 1939 | | 1998 |
| Osceola | Early Settlers of Osceola, Arkansas | | Orville A. Carroll | 1939 | destroyed by fire in 1966 | |
| Paris Post Office, in Paris | Rural Arkansas | | Joseph Vorst | 1940 | winner of the 48-State Mural Competition | 1998 |
| Piggott Post Office, in Piggott | Air Mail | | Daniel Rhodes | 1941 | mural featured on 2019 Post Office Murals stamp set | |
| Pocahontas Post Office, Pocahontas | Early Days and the First Post Office in Pocahontas | | H. Louis Freund | 1939 | restored and on display at Arkansas State University | 2002 |
| Siloam Springs | Lumbering in Arkansas | | Bertrand R. Adams | 1940 | | |
| Springdale | Local Industries | | Natalie Smith Henry | 1940 | on display at Shiloh Museum of Ozark History | |
| Van Buren Post Office, Van Buren | The Chosen Site | | E. Martin Hennings | 1940 | oil on canvas | 1998 |
| Wynne Post Office, in Wynne | Cotton Pickers | | Ethel Magafan | 1940 | | 1998 |
