= Dr. John Grace House and Hospital =

Historic house in Arkansas, United States

- U.S. National Register of Historic Places
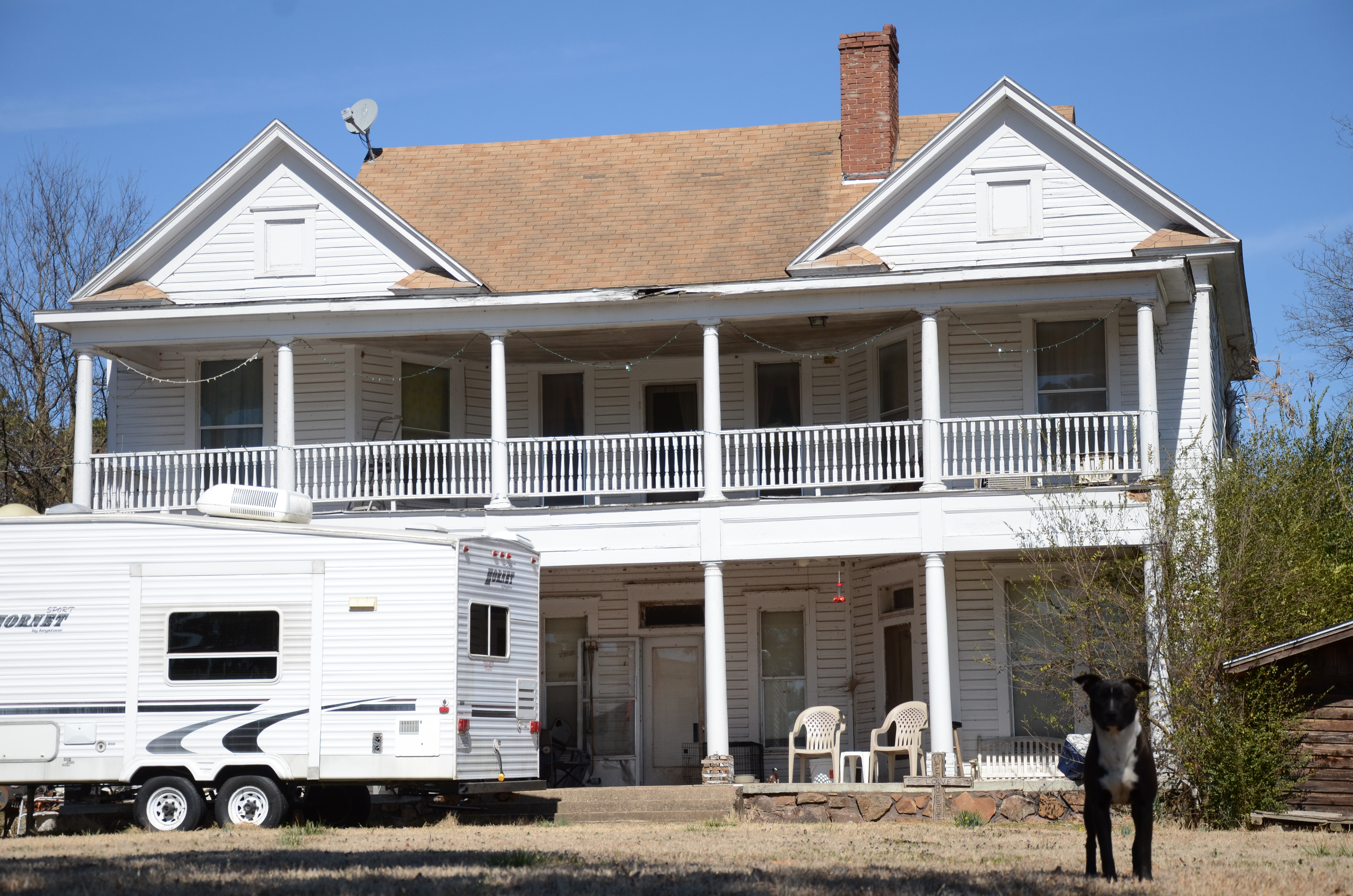

- Location within Arkansas Location within the United States
- Location: 100 North Rd., near Belleville, Arkansas
- Coordinates: 35°6′23″N 93°28′11″W
- Area: 7.2 acres (2.9 ha)
- Built: 1912
- Architectural style: Plain Traditional
- NRHP reference No.: 15000293
- Added to NRHP: May 29, 2015

The Dr. John Grace House and Hospital is a historic house and hospital in rural Yell County, Arkansas. Located on the north side of North Road, west of Belleville, it is a two-story L-shaped wood-frame structure. It was built in 1912 for Dr. John Grace, a Yell County native who began practicing medicine in Belleville in 1906, and was until 1937 to sole source of healthcare in the Belleville vicinity.

The house was listed on the National Register of Historic Places in 2015.

== See also ==
- National Register of Historic Places listings in Yell County, Arkansas
