= Dardanelle Methodist Church =

Historic church in Arkansas, United States

- Methodist Episcopal Church, South
- U.S. National Register of Historic Places
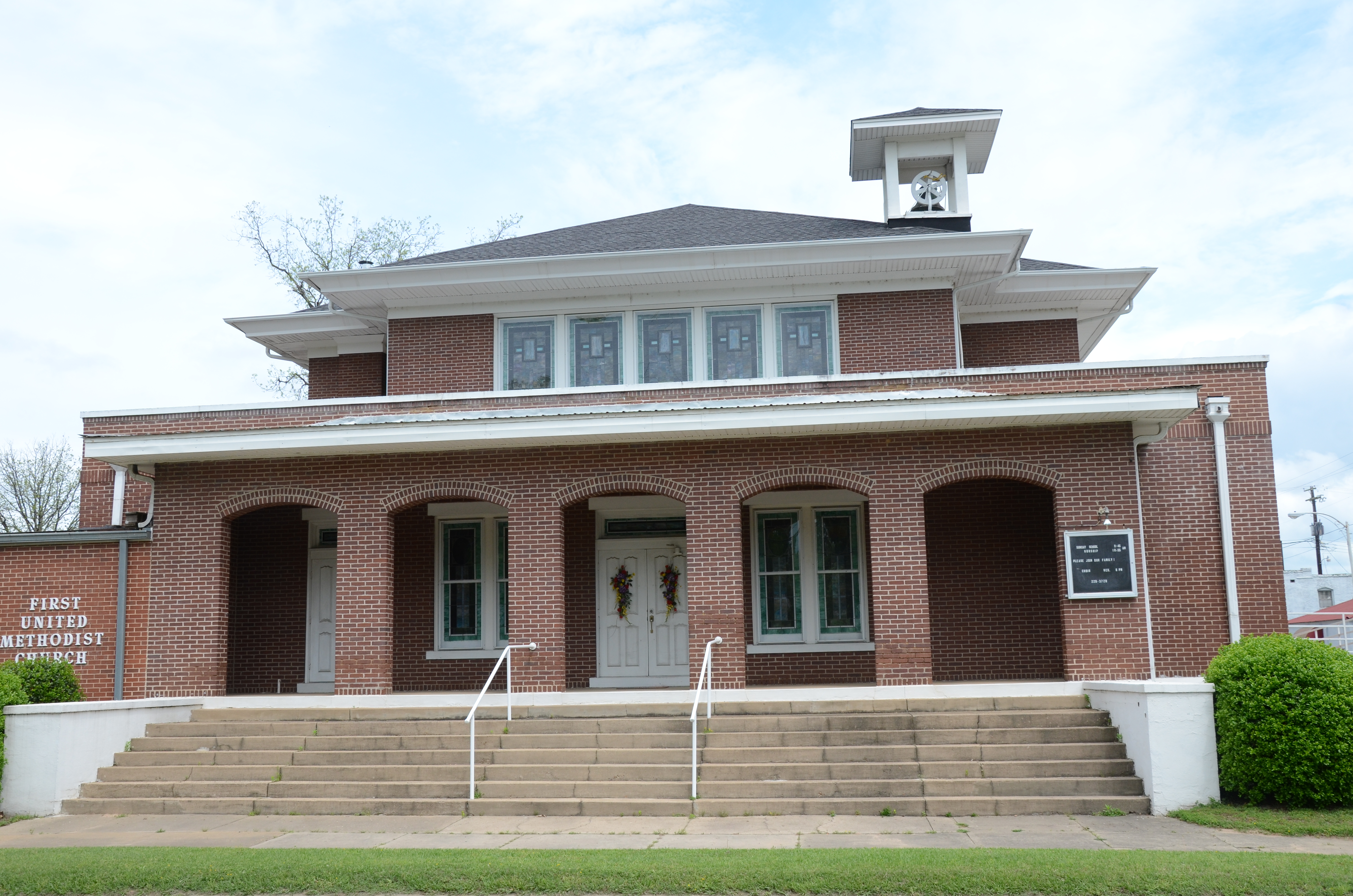

- Location within Arkansas Location within the United States
- Location: Jct. of Locust Dr. and 2nd St., NE corner, Dardanelle, Arkansas
- Coordinates: 35°13′13″N 93°9′15″W
- Area: less than one acre
- Built: 1917
- Architectural style: Prairie School
- NRHP reference No.: 96001275
- Added to NRHP: November 7, 1996

The Dardanelle Methodist Church, formerly the Methodist Episcopal Church, South, is a historic church at 100 North 2nd Street in Dardanelle, Arkansas. It is a 1 1/2-story brick building, constructed in 1891 and extensively altered into its present Prairie School appearance in 1917. The congregation was organized in 1848, and first met in a schoolhouse prior to the construction of its first sanctuary in 1858.

The building was listed on the National Register of Historic Places in 1996. In 2025, the congregation disaffiliated from the United Methodist Church and joined the Global Methodist Church.

== See also ==
- National Register of Historic Places listings in Yell County, Arkansas
