= Thomas James Cotton House =

Historic house in Arkansas, United States

- U.S. National Register of Historic Places
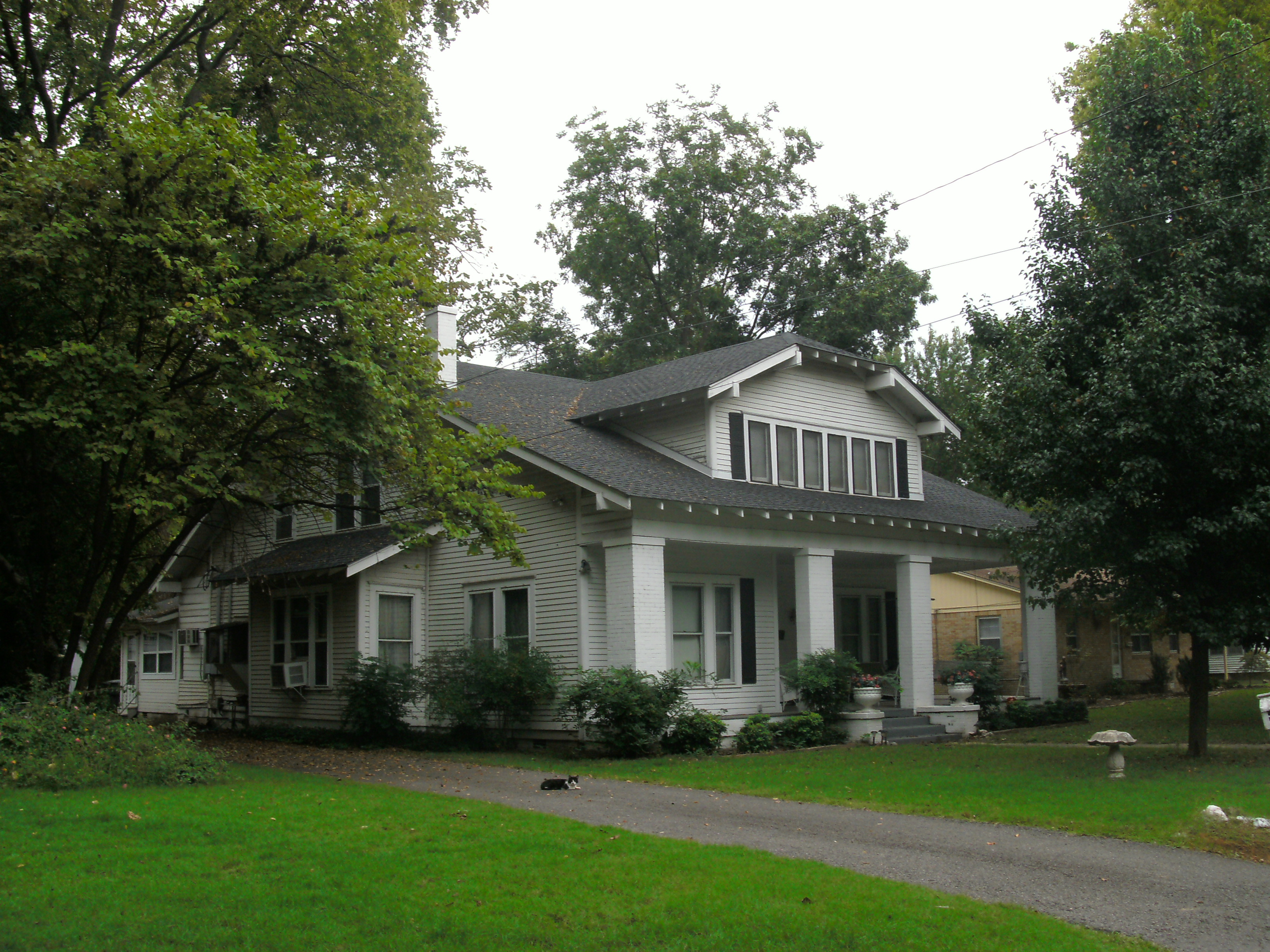

- Location within Arkansas Location within the United States
- Location: 405 S. Third St., Dardanelle, Arkansas
- Coordinates: 35°13′12″N 93°9′21″W
- Area: less than one acre
- Built: 1898
- Architect: James H. Bliss, Mckenzie, Barney
- Architectural style: Bungalow/craftsman
- NRHP reference No.: 01000483
- Added to NRHP: May 10, 2001

The Thomas James Cotton House is a historic house at 405 South Third Street in Dardanelle, Arkansas. It is a 1 1/2-story wood-frame structure, built in 1898 and extensively remodeled in 1916 to give it its present Craftsman appearance. It has a side-gable roof, with exposed rafter ends, which extends over a shallow front porch supported by unusually wide square columns. A wide clipped-gable dormer projects from the front roof face, with a band of casement windows flanked by shutters.

The house was listed on the National Register of Historic Places in 2001.

== See also ==
- National Register of Historic Places listings in Yell County, Arkansas
