= Spring Lake Recreation Area =

- Spring Lake Recreation Area Historic District
- U.S. National Register of Historic Places
- U.S. Historic district
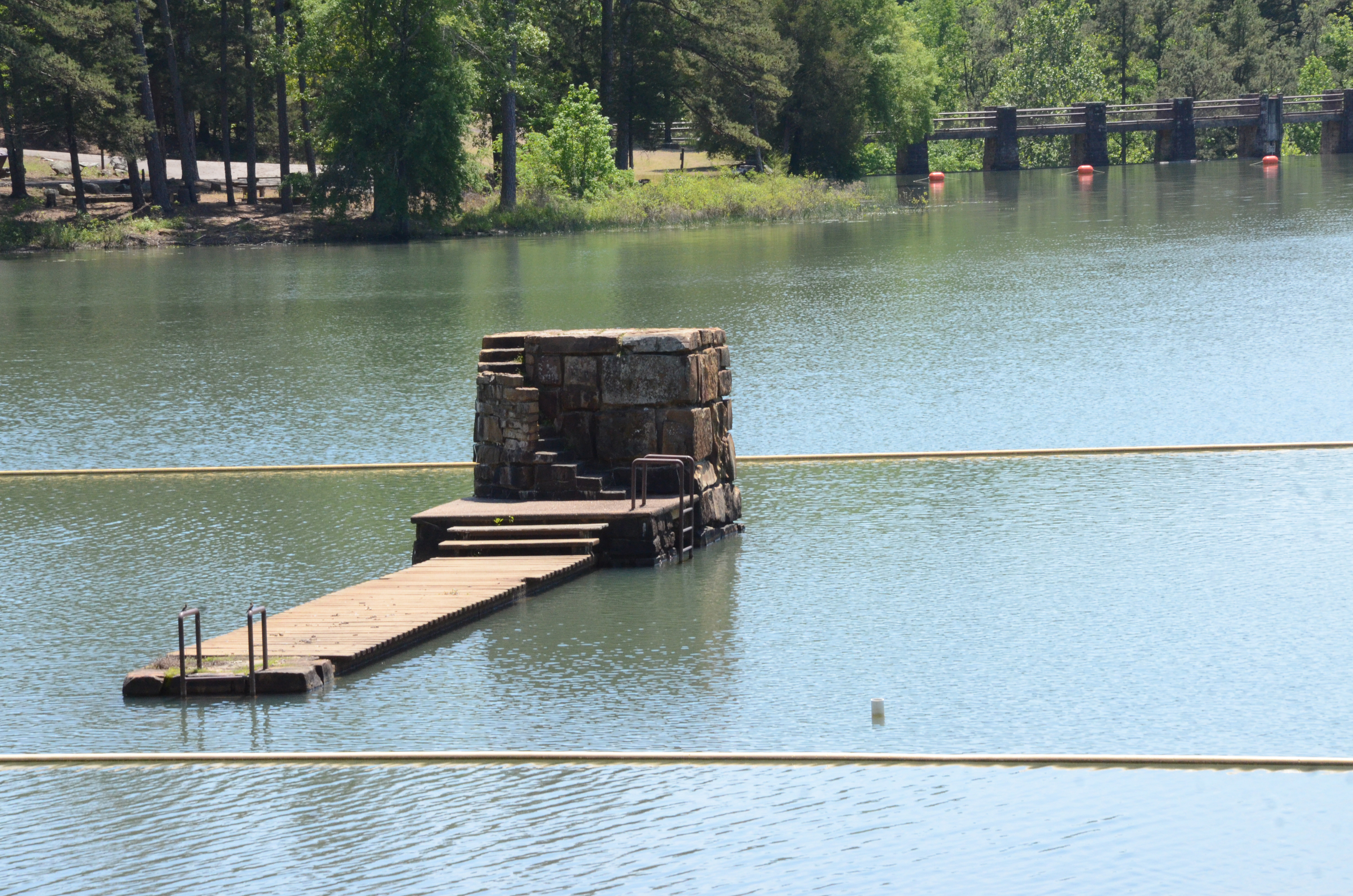
- The diving structure

- Location within Arkansas Location within the United States
- Location: Forest Service Rd. 1602, Ozark-St. Francis National Forest, Stafford, Arkansas
- Coordinates: 35°9′12″N 93°25′30″W
- Area: 143 acres (58 ha)
- Built: 1937
- Built by: Works Progress Administration
- Architectural style: Rustic
- NRHP reference No.: 94001613
- Added to NRHP: September 11, 1995

Spring Lake Recreation Area is located in the Magazine Ranger District of the Ozark-St. Francis National Forest in Yell County north of Danville, Arkansas. Constructed in 1937 with Works Progress Administration (WPA) funds, Spring Lake's rustic native stone and log Civilian Conservation Corp style structures include two picnic pavilions and developed picnic sites, a bathhouse, two swimming platforms, the Spring Lake Bridge, walkways, stone walls, and the lake's dam, which impounds Spring Creek at the lake's southern end. The recreation area also includes 13 campsites. The area was listed on the National Register of Historic Places in 1995 as the Spring Lake Recreation Area Historic District.

== See also ==
- National Register of Historic Places listings in Yell County, Arkansas
