= Spring Lake Bridge =

- U.S. National Register of Historic Places
- U.S. Historic district – Contributing property
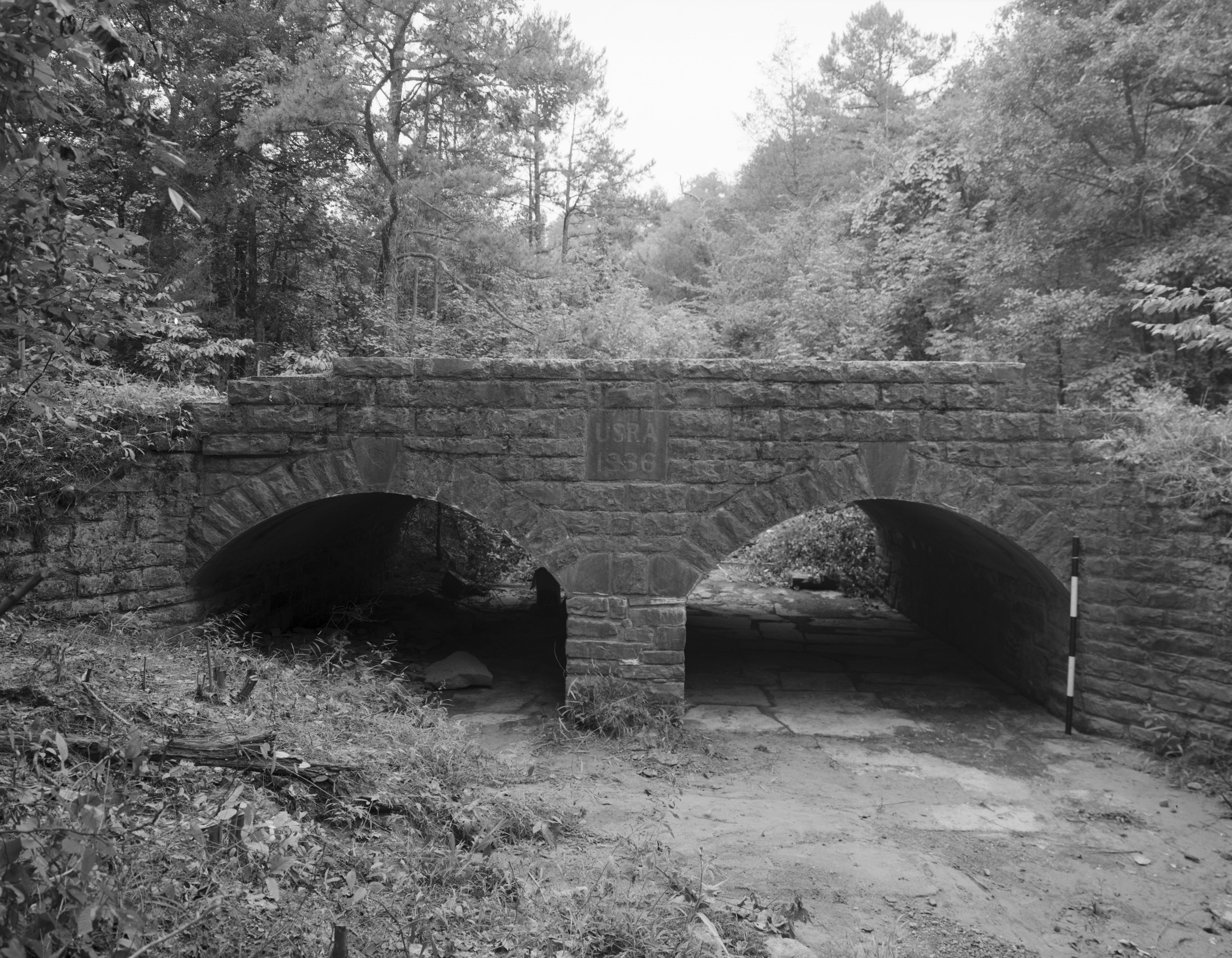
- HAER photo, 1988

- Location within Arkansas Location within the United States
- Nearest city: Belleville, Arkansas
- Coordinates: 35°9′4″N 93°25′54″W
- Area: less than one acre
- Built: 1936
- Built by: Resettlement Administration
- Architectural style: Closed spandrel arch
- Part of: Spring Lake Recreation Area Historic District (ID94001613)
- MPS: Historic Bridges of Arkansas MPS
- NRHP reference No.: 90000510

Significant dates
- Added to NRHP: June 21, 1990
- Designated CP: September 11, 1995

The Spring Lake Bridge is a historic bridge in the eastern part of Ozark-St. Francis National Forest, carrying County Road 35 across an inlet of Spring Lake known as Bob Barnes Branch, in the Spring Lake Recreation Area with the Ozark–St. Francis National Forest. It is a two-span closed-spandrel stone arch bridge with a total length of 36 feet (11 m). Each arch is 10 feet (3.0 m) long and 6 feet (1.8 m) high. Built in 1936 with federal funding, it is one of the state's finest examples of a stone arch bridge.

The bridge was listed on the National Register of Historic Places in 1990.

== See also ==
- List of bridges documented by the Historic American Engineering Record in Arkansas
- List of bridges on the National Register of Historic Places in Arkansas
- National Register of Historic Places listings in Yell County, Arkansas
