= Archeological Site 3YE958 =

Archaeological site in Arkansas, United States

- U.S. National Register of Historic Places
- Nearest city: Dardanelle, Arkansas
- Area: less than one acre
- MPS: Rock Art Sites in Arkansas TR
- NRHP reference No.: 06000838
- Added to NRHP: November 8, 2006

Archeological Ste 3YE958 is a prehistoric rock art site in the Riverview Recreation Area of Dardanelle, Arkansas. The site consists of a rock panel that has been painted with nine figures in red pigment. The date of the paintings is unknown, but was probably executed during the period of the Mississippian culture, when a significant number of similar works were made elsewhere in the Ozark Mountains. Analysis of this panel is expected to expand knowledge of the mechanisms and motives of the painters.

The site was listed on the National Register of Historic Places in 2006.

== See also ==
- National Register of Historic Places listings in Yell County, Arkansas
