= Dardanelle Agriculture and Post Office =

- U.S. National Register of Historic Places
- U.S. Historic district – Contributing property
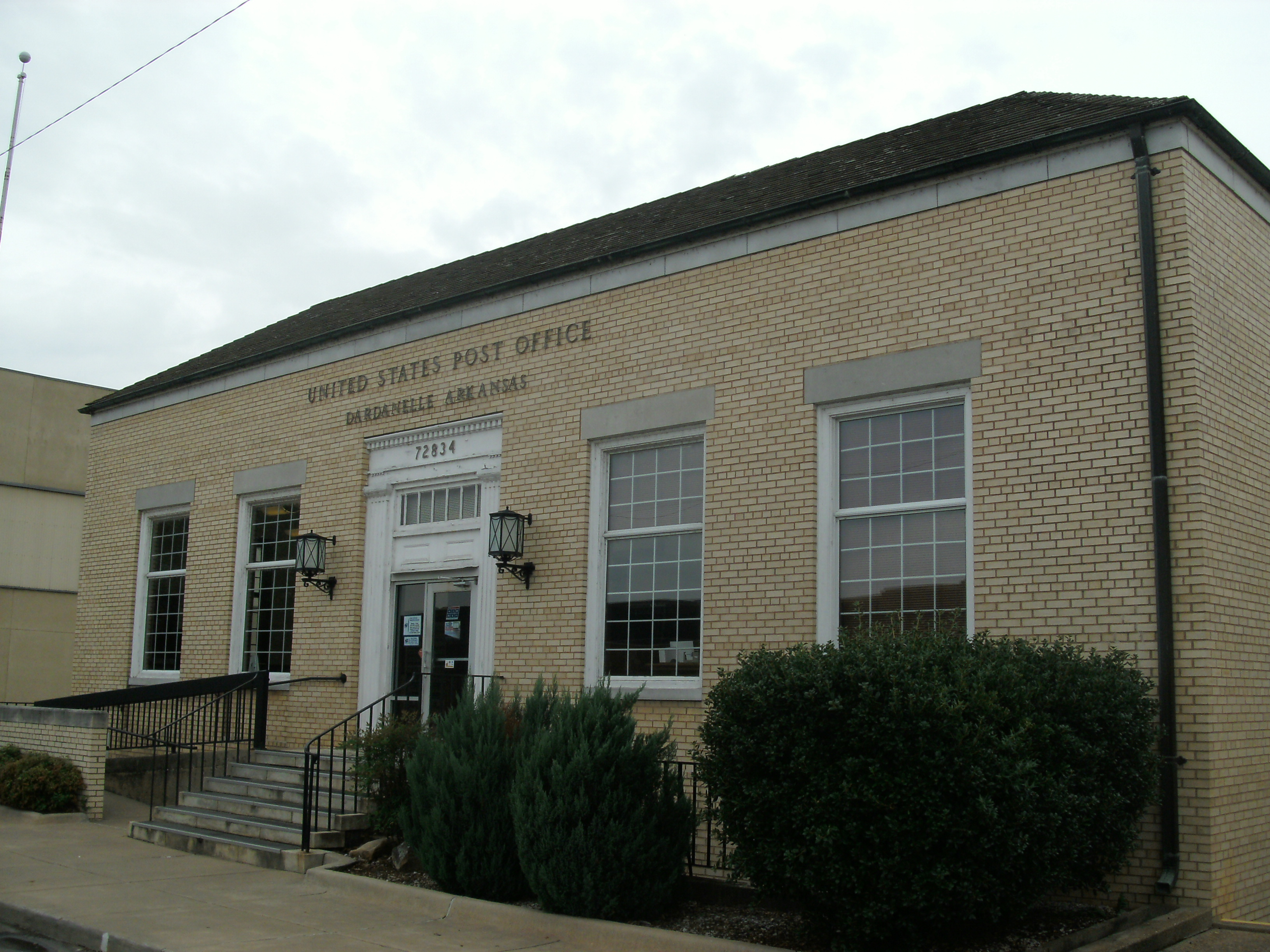

- Location within Arkansas Location within the United States
- Location: 103 N. Front St., Dardanelle, Arkansas
- Coordinates: 35°13′14″N 93°8′50″W
- Area: less than one acre
- Built: 1938
- Artist: Ludwig Mactarian
- Architectural style: Colonial Revival
- Part of: Dardanelle Commercial Historic District (ID08001039)
- MPS: Post Offices with Section Art in Arkansas MPS
- NRHP reference No.: 98000919

Significant dates
- Added to NRHP: August 14, 1998
- Designated CP: January 28, 2009

The Dardanelle Post Office, originally the Dardanelle Agriculture and Post Office, is a historic government building at 103 North Front Street in downtown Dardanelle, Arkansas. It is a single-story brick building, with a hip roof. It has a five-bay front facade, with a center entrance flanked by pilasters and topped by a panel, transom window, and dentillated entablature. Built in 1937, it has modest Colonial Revival style, and is most notable for the mural in the lobby, painted in 1939 by Ludwig Mactarian, and entitled Cotton Growing, Manufacture and Export.

The building was listed on the National Register of Historic Places in 1998.

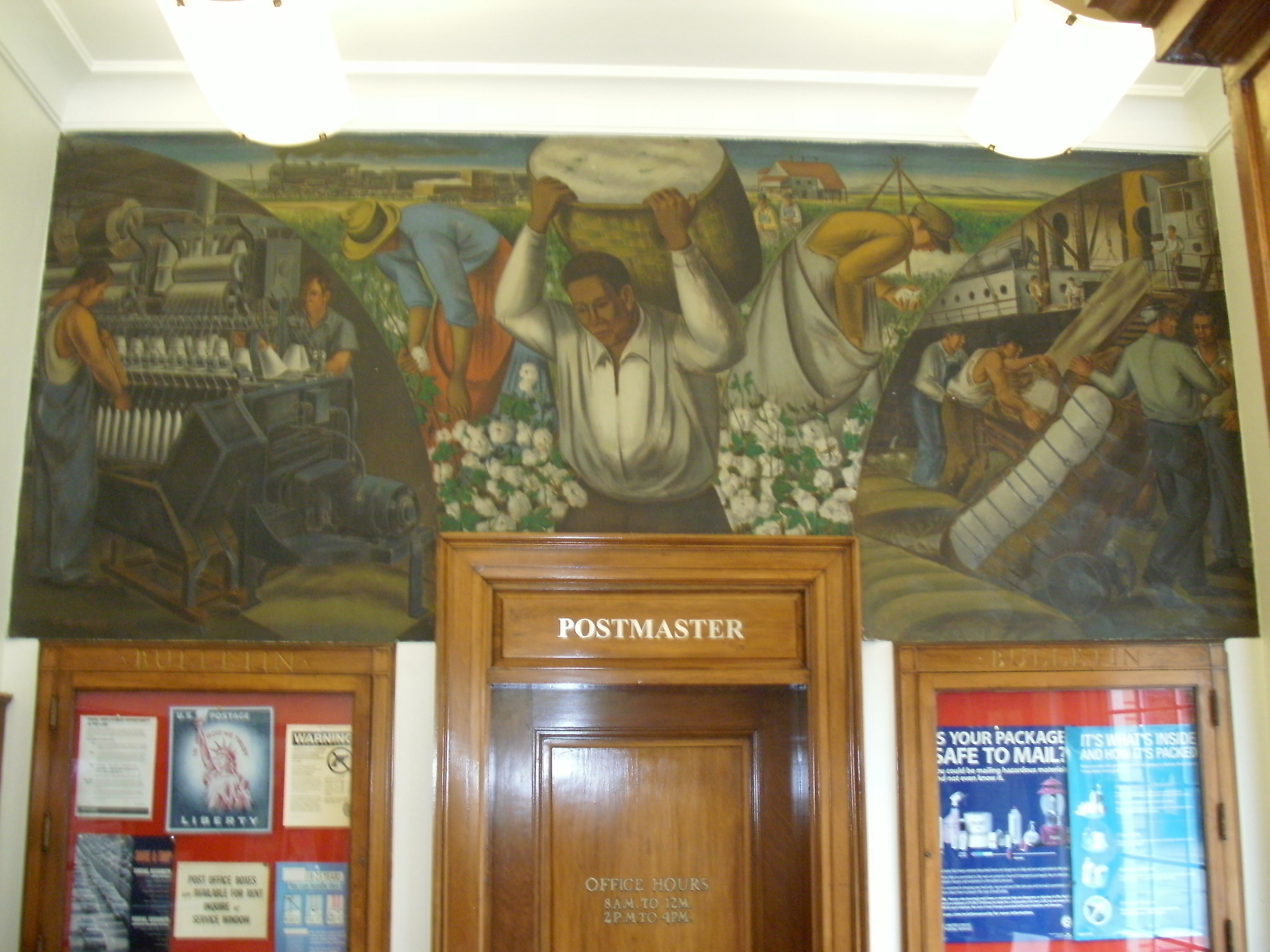
Cotton Growing, Manufacture, and Export, mural by Ludwig Mactarian

== See also ==
- List of United States post offices
- List of United States post office murals in Arkansas
- National Register of Historic Places listings in Yell County, Arkansas
