= Mount Nebo (Arkansas) =

Mountain in Arkansas, United States

Coordinates: 35°13′00″N 93°15′07″W

Mount Nebo is a mountain Located near Dardanelle, Arkansas. It has an elevation of 1,350 feet (410 m) above the mountain valleys of west-central Arkansas to an elevation of about 1,755 feet (535 m) above sea level, Mount Nebo has views of 34,000 acres (140 km^{2}) Lake Dardanelle, the Arkansas River and the surrounding mountain ridges. Atop this biblically named plateau is Mount Nebo State Park. Developed as a resort area in the late 19th century, it became a state park in 1928, its early development spearheaded by the Civilian Conservation Corps. Park activities include hiking, camping, and other outdoor pursuits.

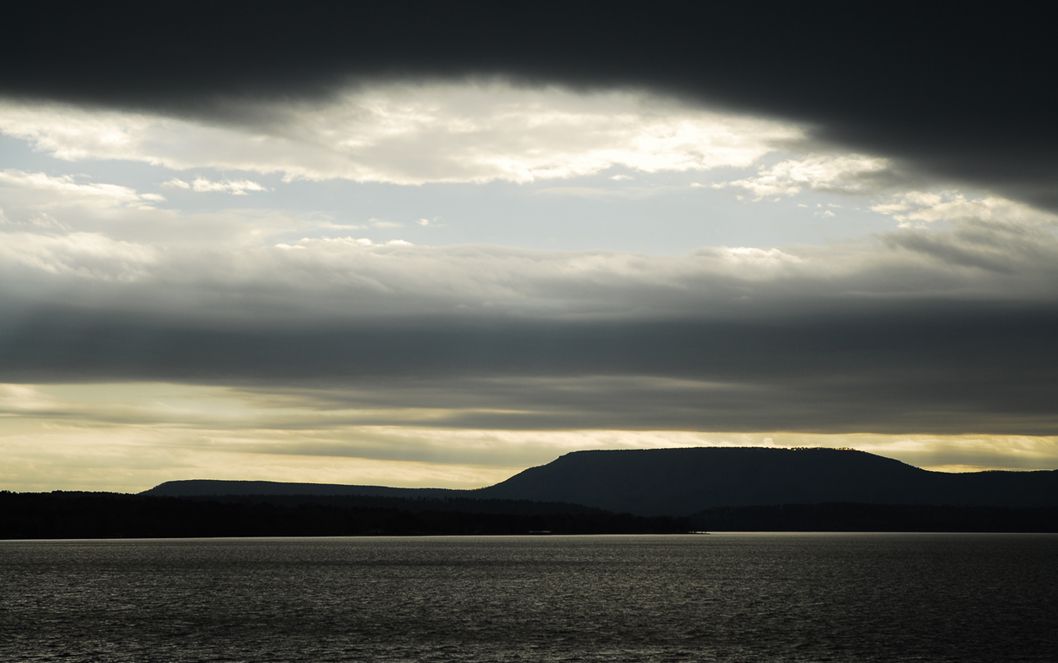
Mt. Nebo viewed from Lake Dardanelle

== History ==
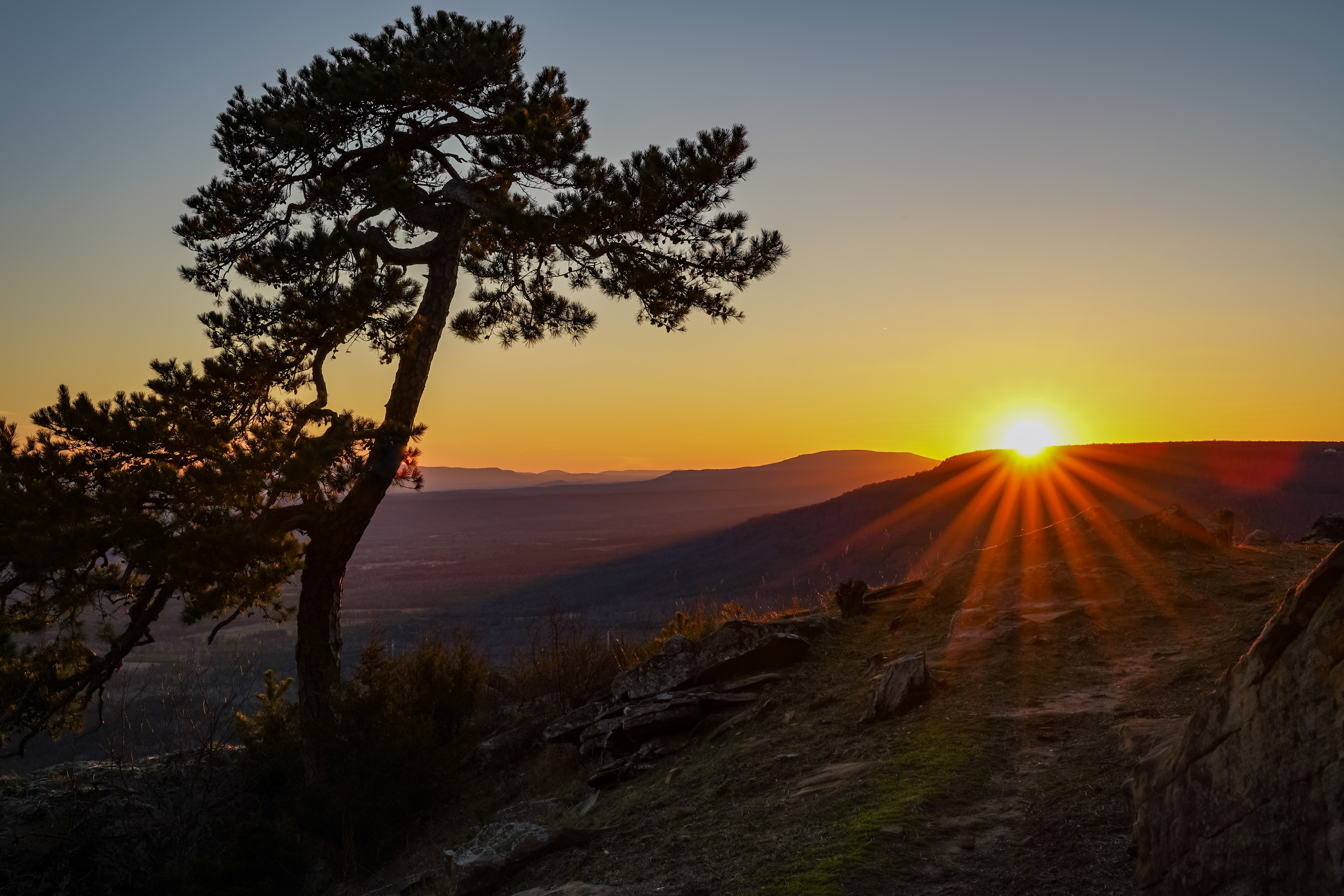
Sunset at Mount Nebo

Mount Nebo is a flat-topped mountain about 5 miles (8.0 km) west of the city of Dardanelle, from which it is accessed by Arkansas Highway 155. The mountaintop is roughly in the shape of an apostrophe or teardrop, with a point at its northwesterly tip, and a wide south-facing base, from which curving sides trend north to northwest. A few hundred feet below the summit is a "bench", or slightly wider terrace, from which the shoulders of the mount slope steeply down to the valley floor. The bench is impervious to water so rainwater percolating down through the soil builds up in the underlying pockets and results in the numerous springs found on the Bench Trail.

The mountain was identified on early maps as Magazin(e) Mt.

Early settlers on the mountain built log structures on the bench, near where springs were located. The bench proved to be wide enough for a road and building sites. Most or all of the original 12 log cabins, including the first built by Colonel Sam Dickins of Virginia, burned or deteriorated during the Civil War.

The mountain was named Nebo by Mrs. Louis White after the Civil War in the late 1860s. She named it after the mountain mentioned in the bible from which Moses had a view of the Promised Land. The Whites and other Dardanelle families lived on the mountain during the summer months. The White home stood on the bench by Nebo Springs until 1934.

=== Summit development begins ===
The first major use of the mountain's summit area by an American was in 1878, when Captain Joseph Evins, a native of Kentucky, acquired title to it, and established an orchard. He built a house on the summit near Sunrise Point and planted 40 acres (16 ha) of fruit trees. Apples, peaches, pears, cherries, strawberries, raspberries and some vegetables were grown. He also had one of the best, largest and most profitable vineyards in the country.

Realizing the potential for a resort area, Captain Evins sought and gained the interest of other capitalists from Little Rock, Hot Springs and Memphis. Together they formed the Nebo Improvement Company. The west end of the mountain was surveyed and laid out in blocks. The men in the company then drew lots for the location of their houses, which were built in 1889 on the west bluff near Sunset Point.

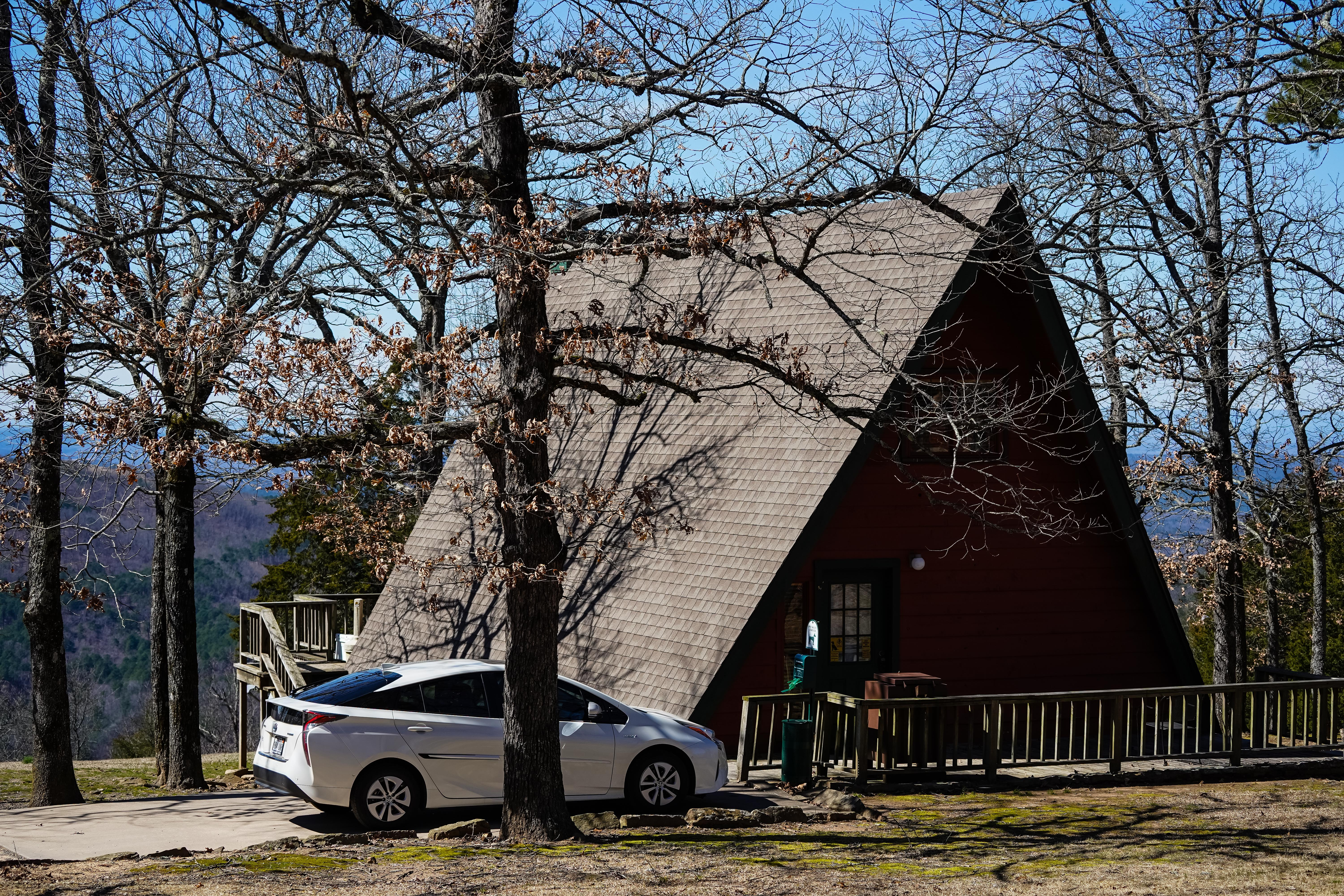
A-frame (and other) pet-friendly cabins, available to book, at Mount Nebo.

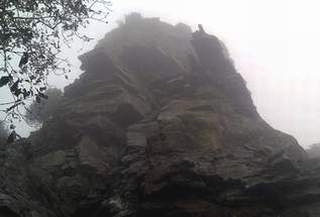
A foggy day on Mount Nebo. Rock outcroppings like this area make the state park popular with hikers and climbers.

=== Summit Park Hotel ===
Sills and heavy lumber for construction of the Summit Park Hotel were cut on Spring Mountain and hauled by oxen and mule teams up the old road on the south side of Nebo. Dressed lumber was shipped from Little Rock by way of Russellville on the railroad. Lumber was then brought to Nebo by four mule trains to the big pine known as "halfway pine." It was hauled the rest of the way in smaller loads by way of the bench and an old road at the west end of the mountain. The Summit Park Hotel opened for business in June 1889. The hotel was a three-story main building of 100 rooms with a large wing used for the dining room. There were separate buildings for the laundry, bakery, kitchen and store rooms to lessen the chance of damage by fire. A second two-story building contained the ballroom, with the hotel employees and servants housed on the second floor. An additional long, low building known as the 13-room cottage and another similar one, the 16-room cottage, supplied sleeping rooms when the crowds overflowed the hotel. Still another building housed the bowling alley, billiard rooms, post office, doctor's office and telephone exchange. Members of the band, consisting of about 10 black men, worked as waiters during the day and played in the orchestra at night for dances. They slept and practiced in the rooms above. Hotel rates were $35 and $40 a month with special rates for families who were permanent for the season. The price per day for rooms was $2 to $2.50 with weekly rates ranging from $8 to $14. Children under 10 and servants were half price. The bowling alley charged a nickel per game.

Steamboats made four trips a week from Little Rock to Dardanelle transporting summer visitors and their belongings such as formal clothing, horses, and carriages. Visitors came for the "pure chalybeate waters" believed to have sufficient medicinal value to cure illnesses such as asthma, malaria, and dyspepsia. Anyone suffering from exhaustion due to overtaxed mental or physical labor would also be restored to full strength and vitality in just 30 days. Mount Nebo was a retreat for men and women wearied in body and soul. It was also touted as a place to get away from mosquitoes that carried malaria and yellow fever which were more prevalent during that time due to the large areas of wetlands.

A boardwalk extended from where the visitor's information center is today to Sunset Point. Boardwalks also led to Gum Springs and Darling Springs where guests could sit and muse in the gazebos. During the busy season carriages and stages likewise shuttled between Sunrise Point and Sunset Point along Grand Avenue and bicycles were so numerous they were a hazard.

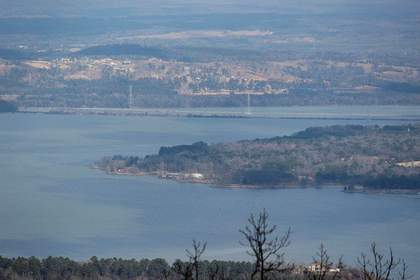
A view of Lake Dardanelle from Mount Nebo.

By the 1890s, two large hotels with 100 rooms each and a normal school graced the mountain along with many homes. There was also a bowling alley, ballroom, post office, telephone exchange, and a stable of riding horses.

=== Decline and conversion to state park ===
The Summit Park Hotel was completely destroyed by fire on Sunday, May 18, 1918, marking a start in the mountain's decline as a resort. The hotel was never rebuilt, and local interests in Dardanelle proposed the establishment of a state park. Arkansas was then in the early stages of acquiring land for parks, and it was not until 1928 that the park was formally established; it was the state's second park, after Petit Jean State Park. A significant portion of the land acquired by the state in the early days came through the seizure or donation of land on which taxes were delinquent. The park had no facilities until 1933.

During the period following the burning of the hotel and the development of the state park, the small Mount Nebo community continued to exist. In 1924, the local women, fed up with what they saw as the local (all-male) leadership's lack of action on improving the situation on the mountain, organized politically, and an all-female slate of candidates swept the local elections in April of that year; this marked the first recorded instance of a municipal government in Arkansas that was completely run by women. Although conditions were slightly improved during their administration, the general economic decline did not change.

=== Civilian Conservation Corps development ===
When the Civilian Conservation Corps was established in 1933, the state designated Mount Nebo State Park as one of the areas its local crews should work on. Over a two-year period, CCC crew 1780 developed significant portions of park infrastructure, including the construction of roads, bridges, cabins, hiking trails, and pavilions. The main pavilion, built by the CCC around 1935, was listed on the National Register of Historic Places in 1992. Ten of the surviving CCC-built cabins were also listed on the National Register in 2016, six individually and four as a group.

== Facilities ==
The park facilities include a visitor center, 15 cabins available for rent, 25 camping sites, picnic areas, a swimming pool, 25 miles (40 km) of hiking and mountain biking trails, and other outdoor recreational facilities for use by the public.

== See also ==
- National Register of Historic Places listings in Yell County, Arkansas
