= Mountain View Farm (Plainview, Arkansas) =

Historic house in Arkansas, United States

- U.S. National Register of Historic Places
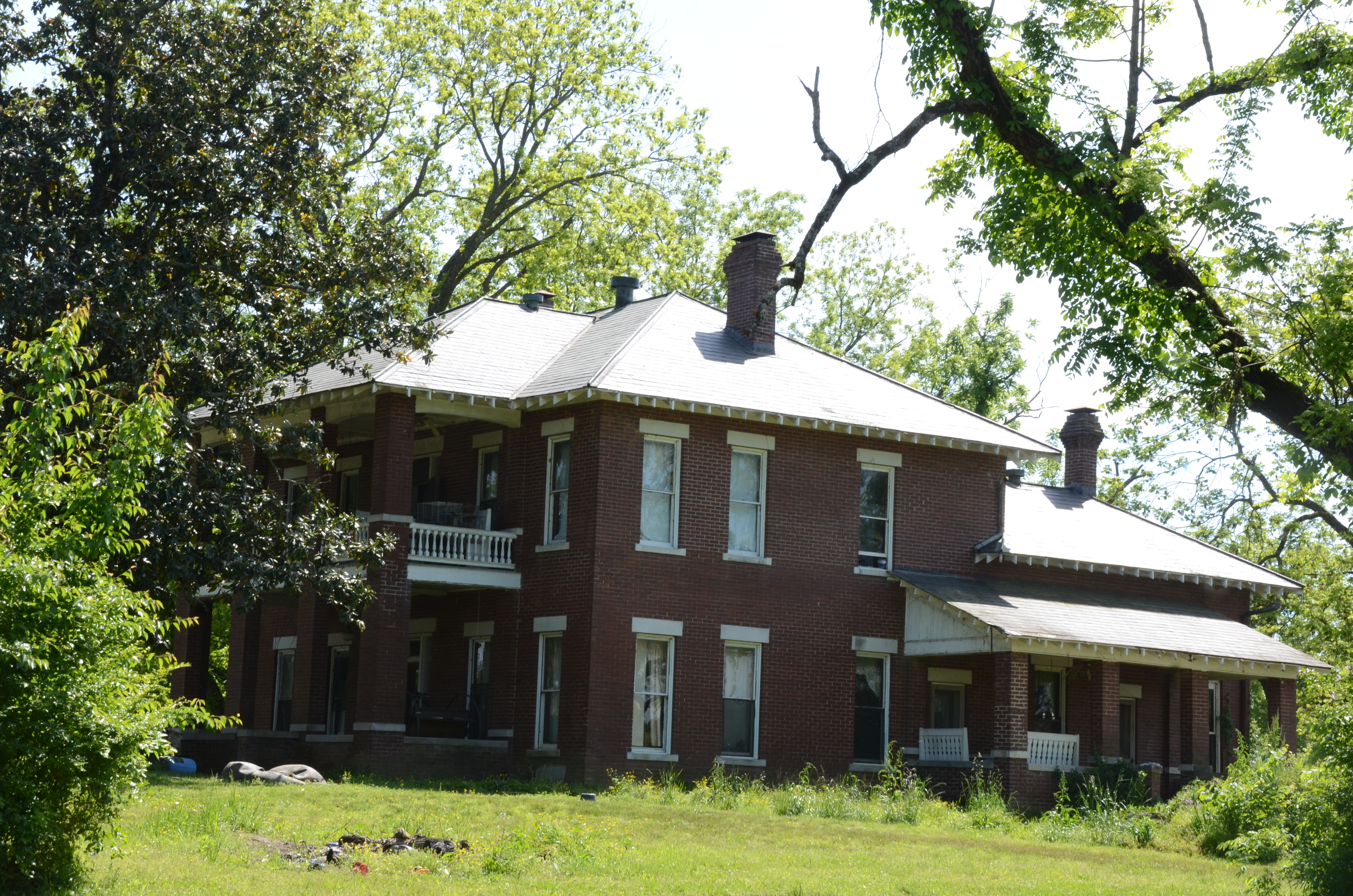

- Location within Arkansas Location within the United States
- Nearest city: Plainview, Arkansas
- Coordinates: 34°58′38″N 93°17′45″W
- Architectural style: American foursquare
- NRHP reference No.: 96001270
- Added to NRHP: November 7, 1996

Mountain View Farm is a historic farm property in rural Yell County, Arkansas. It is located at the eastern end of County Road 218, south of Plainview. The main house is a two-story American Foursquare structure, built out of brick and covered by a hip roof. A two-story porch extends across the front, with spindled balustrades and exposed rafters. It was built in 1917 for Richard Tippy (CR 218 is also known as Tippy Lane), and is one of the finest period farmhouses in the Plainview area.

The property was listed on the National Register of Historic Places in 1996.

== See also ==
- National Register of Historic Places listings in Yell County, Arkansas
