= Berry House (Dardanelle, Arkansas) =

Historic church in Arkansas, United States

- First Presbyterian Church–Berry House
- Formerly listed on the U.S. National Register of Historic Places
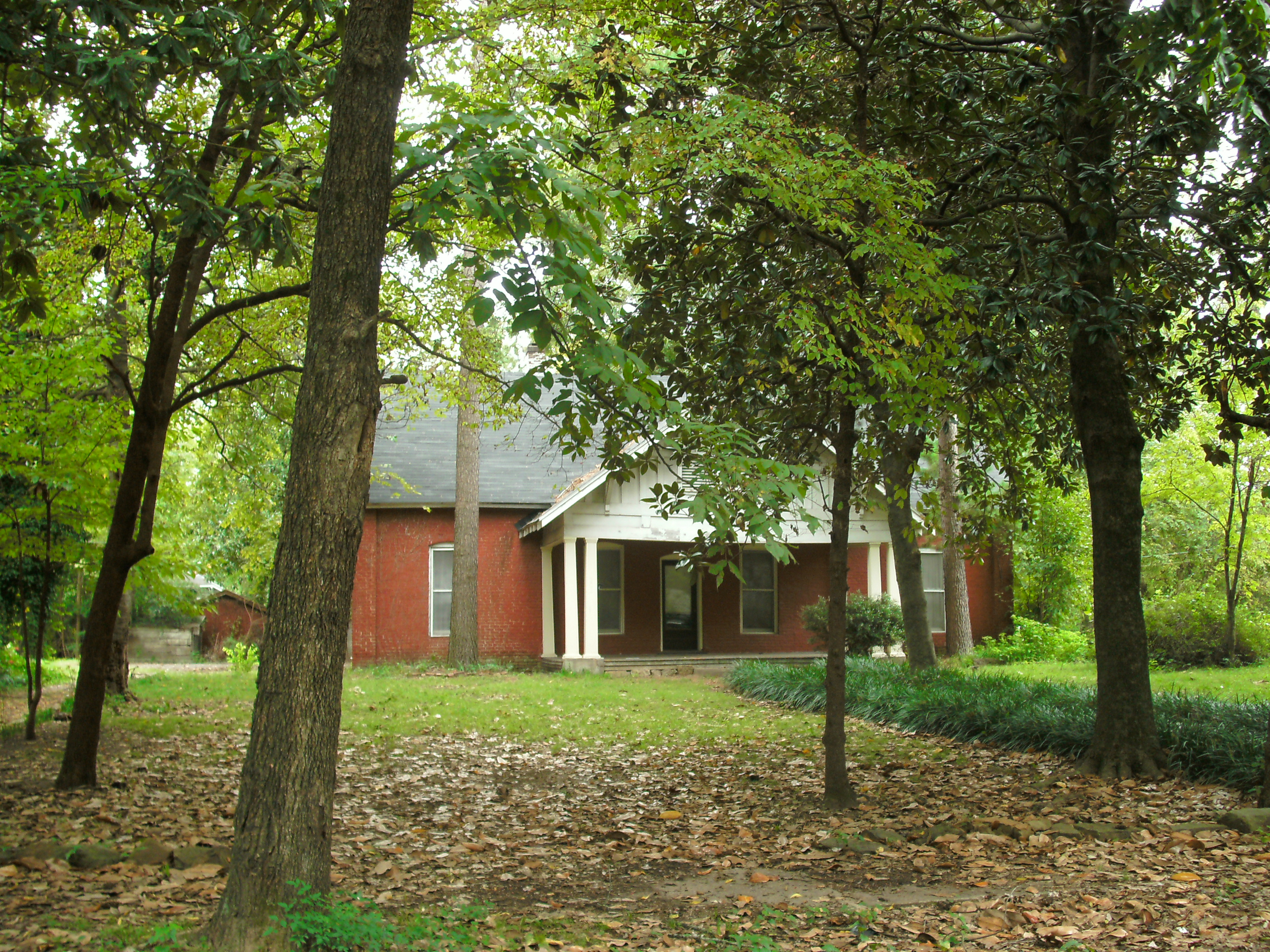

- Location within Arkansas Location within the United States
- Location: 203 Pecan St., Dardanelle, Arkansas
- Coordinates: 35°13′3″N 93°9′15″W
- Area: less than one acre
- Built: 1872
- Architectural style: Bungalow/craftsman, Plain traditional
- NRHP reference No.: 98000582

Significant dates
- Added to NRHP: June 3, 1998
- Removed from NRHP: January 2, 2024

The Berry House was a historic building in Dardanelle, Arkansas. It was originally built in 1872 as the First Presbyterian Church. About 1912, it was converted to a private residence, and the congregation moved into its current location.

The building was a single-story brick structure, with a gabled roof and brick foundation. A cross-gabled porch projected from the front, supported by square posts. It originally had a bell tower and vernacular style. During the conversion to a house, the tower was removed, and the Craftsman-style porch was added.

The building was listed on the National Register of Historic Places in 1998. After several building experts examined the structural integrity of the house, it was determined that the structure was no longer safe. Accordingly, the structure was demolished on January 23, 2020. It was removed from the National Register in 2024.

== See also ==
- National Register of Historic Places listings in Yell County, Arkansas
