= Dardanelle Commercial Historic District =

Historic district in Arkansas, United States

- U.S. National Register of Historic Places
- U.S. Historic district
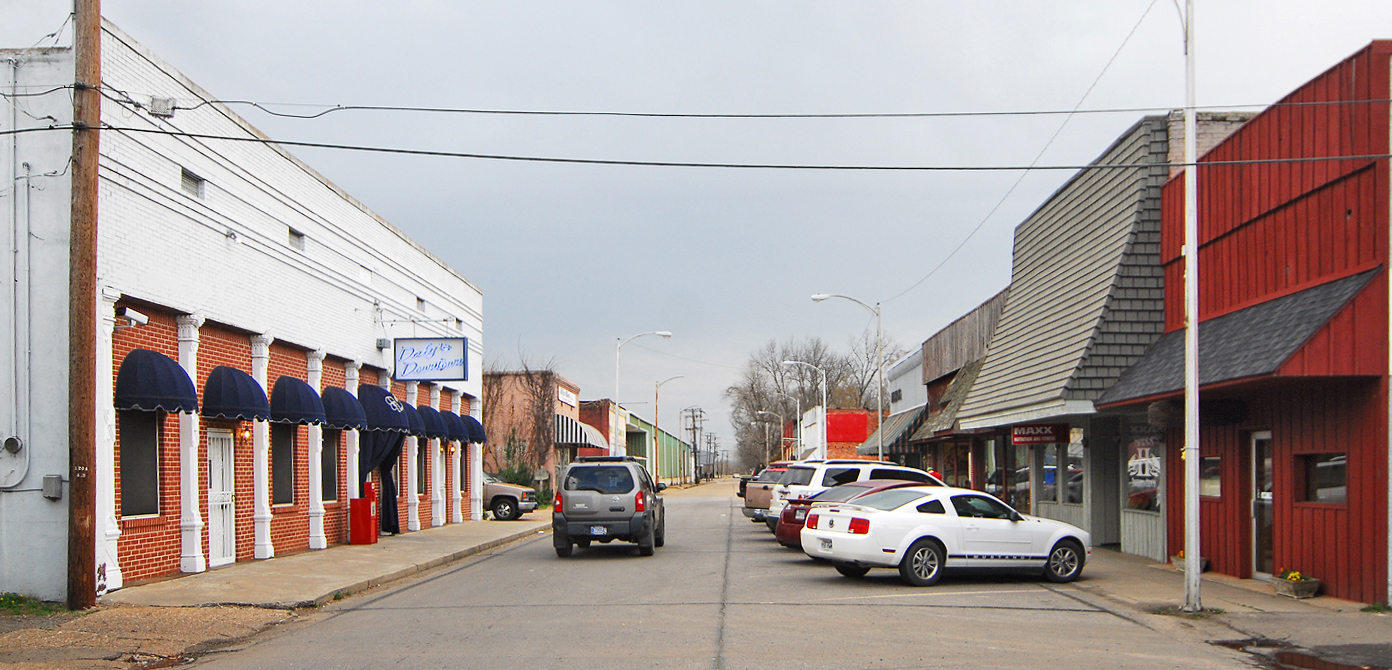

- Location within Arkansas Location within the United States
- Location: Roughly bounded by Front, Oak, 2nd and Pine Sts., Dardanelle, Arkansas
- Coordinates: 35.22037°N 93.15318°W
- Area: 25 acres (10 ha)
- Built: 1891
- Architectural style: Gothic Revival, Early Commercial
- NRHP reference No.: 08001039
- Added to NRHP: January 28, 2009

The Dardanelle Commercial Historic District encompasses the part of the historic central business district of Dardanelle, Arkansas. The district extends along Front Street, from Pine Street in the north to nearly Oak Street in the south, and includes some properties on adjacent cross streets. Although this area has been commercially active since the 1820s (initially as a steamboat port on the Arkansas River), its present architecture reflects the late 19th and early 20th centuries, with modestly scaled one and two story masonry building predominating.

The district was listed on the National Register of Historic Places in 2009. Buildings separately listed on the National Register include the Dardanelle Agriculture and Post Office, and the First Presbyterian Church.

== See also ==
- National Register of Historic Places listings in Yell County, Arkansas
