= First Presbyterian Church (Dardanelle, Arkansas) =

Historic church in Arkansas, United States

- U.S. National Register of Historic Places
- U.S. Historic district – Contributing property
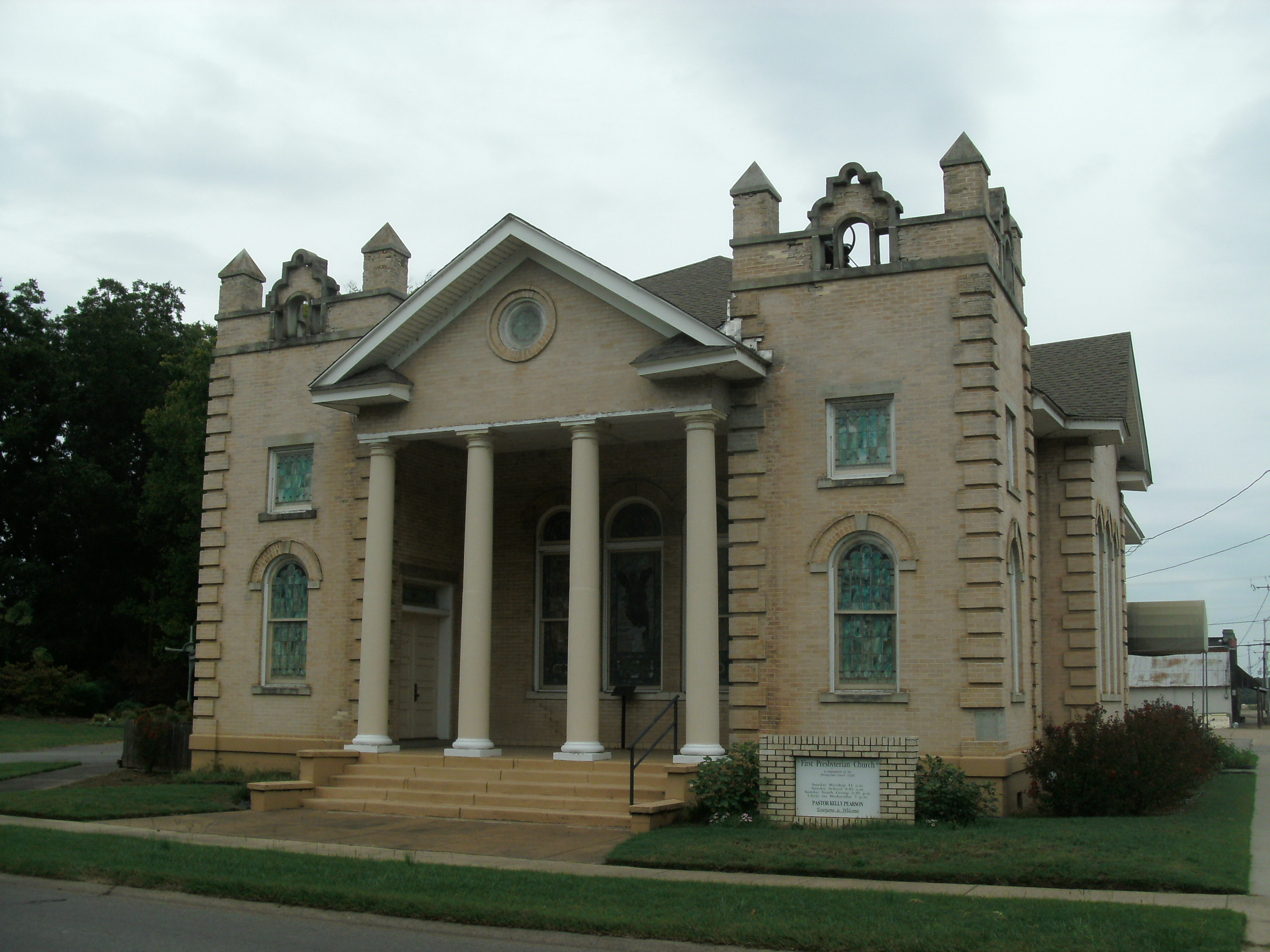

- Location within Arkansas Location within the United States
- Location: Second and Quay Sts., Dardanelle, Arkansas
- Coordinates: 35°13′15″N 93°9′17″W
- Area: less than one acre
- Built: 1912
- Architect: Rev. Frank McKenzie
- Architectural style: Classical Revival
- Part of: Dardanelle Commercial Historic District (ID08001039)
- NRHP reference No.: 87001156

Significant dates
- Added to NRHP: July 9, 1987
- Designated CP: January 28, 2009

The First Presbyterian Church is a historic church at 200 North Second Street (corner of Second and Quay) in Dardanelle, Arkansas. It is a roughly rectangular masonry structure, built out of buff-colored brick and light stone trim. Its front facade consists of a pair of quoined and crenellated tower-like sections flanking a four-column pedimented gable portico, which shelters the entrance. Built in 1912–14, it is locally distinctive for its Classical Revival architecture, and for its Akron Plan interior.

The building was listed on the National Register of Historic Places in 1987.

== See also ==
- Berry House (Dardanelle, Arkansas): the congregation's earlier building
- National Register of Historic Places listings in Yell County, Arkansas
