= Evans-Neuhart House =

Historic house in Arkansas, United States

- Evans-Neuhart Cotton House
- U.S. National Register of Historic Places
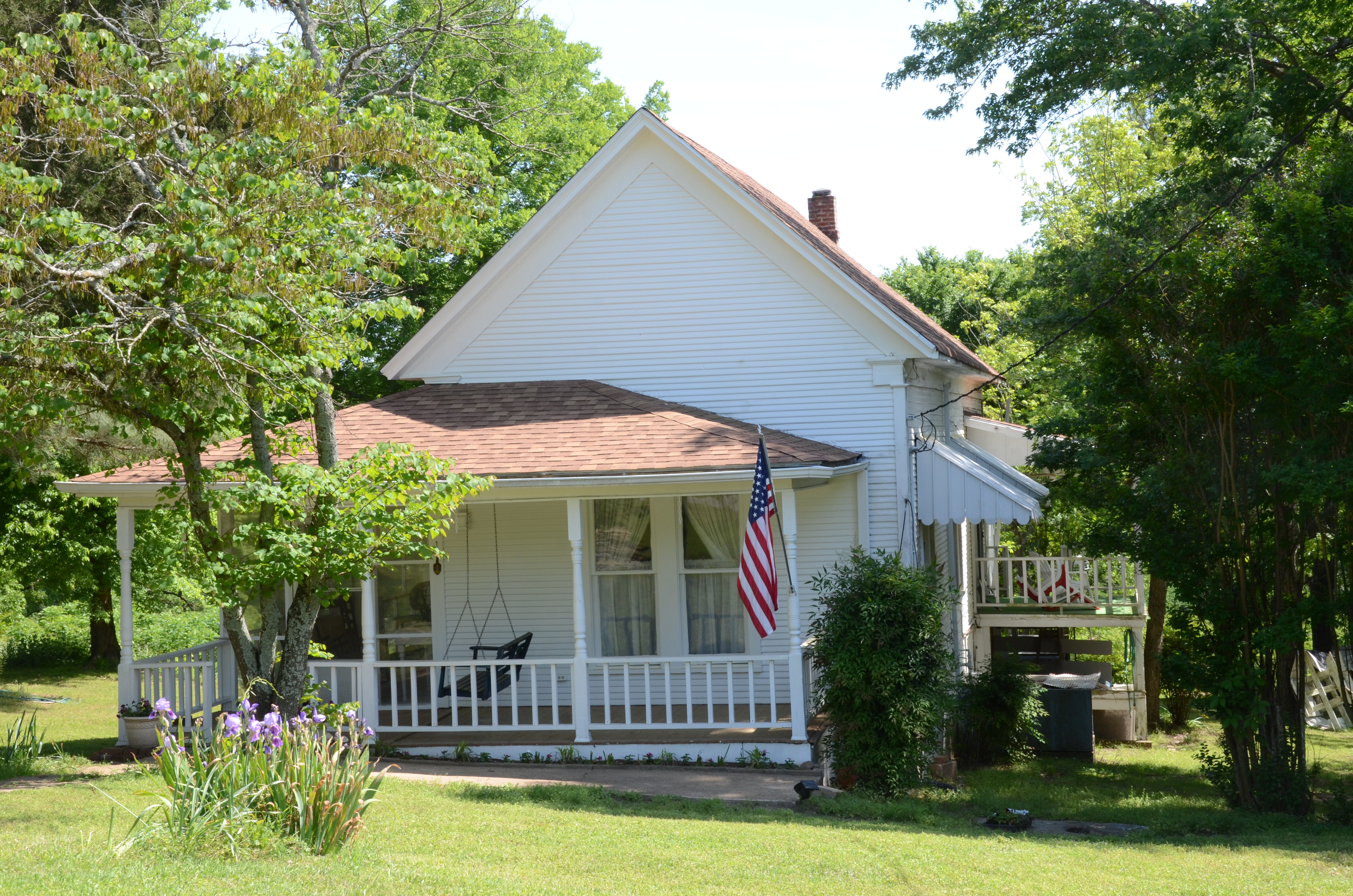

- Location within Arkansas Location within the United States
- Location: 320 E. 5th St., Plainview, Arkansas
- Coordinates: 34°59′27″N 93°17′31″W
- Area: less than one acre
- Built: 1915
- Architectural style: Folk Victorian
- NRHP reference No.: 13001106
- Added to NRHP: January 22, 2014

The Evans-Neuhart House is a historic house at 320 East 5th Street in Plainview, Arkansas, United States. It is a single-story wood-frame structure, with a gabled roof, weatherboard siding, and a foundation of brick piers and wooden beams, now covered with brick. It has an L-shaped featuring original turned posts and a tongue-in-groove ceiling. It was built about 1915, and is a prominent local surviving example of Folk Victorian architecture.

The house was listed on the National Register of Historic Places in 2014.

== See also ==
- National Register of Historic Places listings in Yell County, Arkansas
