= CCC Company 749 Powder Magazine =

- U.S. National Register of Historic Places
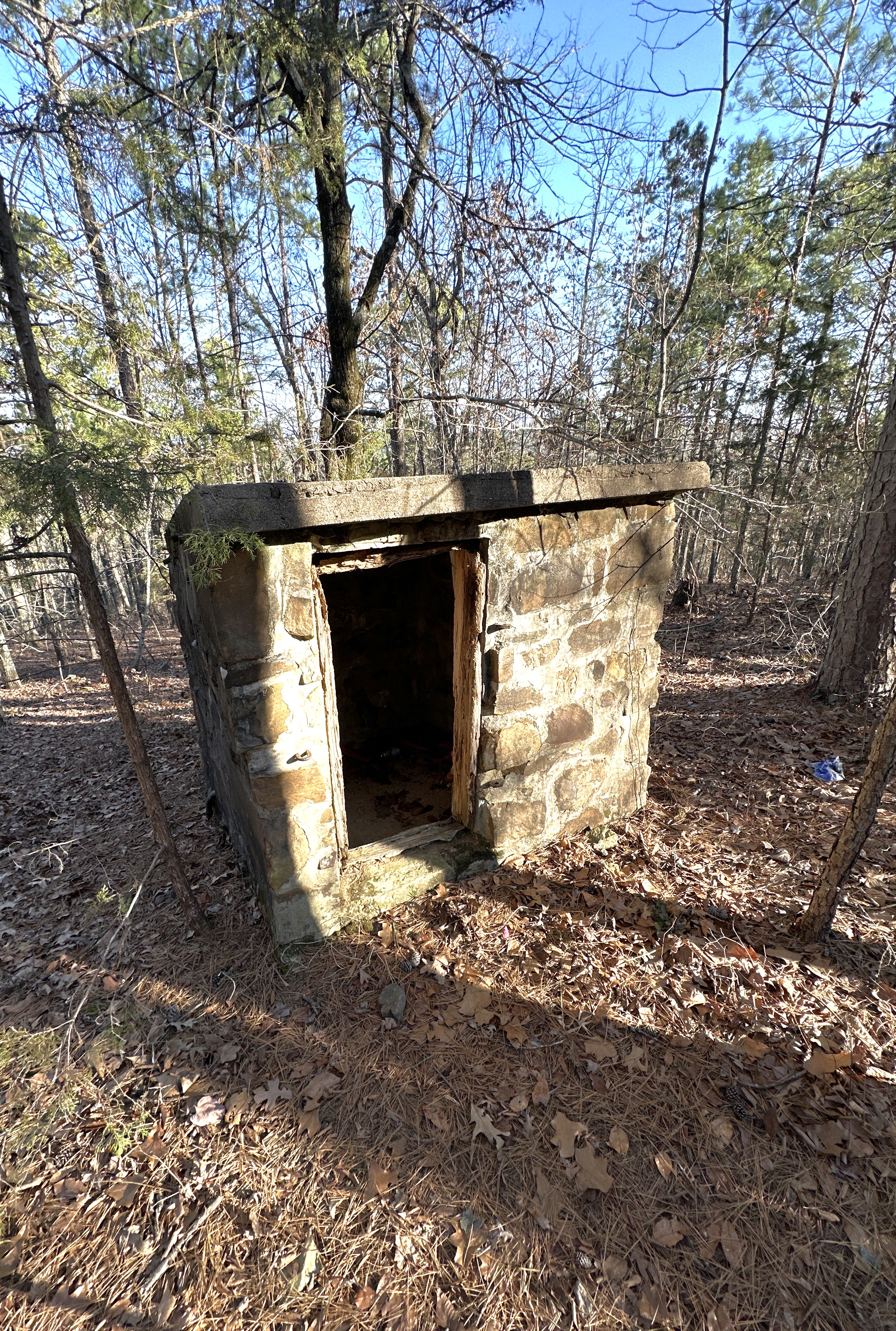
- CCC Company 749 Powder Magazine in 2026

- Location within Arkansas Location within the United States
- Nearest city: Briggsville, Arkansas
- Coordinates: 34°51′19″N 93°29′57″W
- Area: less than one acre
- Built: 1933
- Built by: Civilian Conservation Corps
- MPS: Facilities Constructed by the CCC in Arkansas MPS
- NRHP reference No.: 07000199
- Added to NRHP: March 30, 2007

The CCC Company 947 Powder Magazine is a historic powder magazine in the eastern part of Ouachita National Forest. It is located in southern Yell County, about 200 yards (180 m) down a slope north of a ridge running parallel to Forest Road 71. The structure is made of stone and concrete, and is 6 feet (1.8 m) square and 5 feet (1.5 m) high, with a flat concrete roof and floor. The entrance is on the southeast side. The building was erected about 1933 by a crew of the Civilian Conservation Corps, and was used to store explosive materials used in the construction of roads and bridges in the area.

The building was listed on the National Register of Historic Places in 2007.

== See also ==
- National Register of Historic Places listings in Yell County, Arkansas
