= Kimball House (Dardanelle, Arkansas) =

Historic house in Arkansas, United States

- U.S. National Register of Historic Places
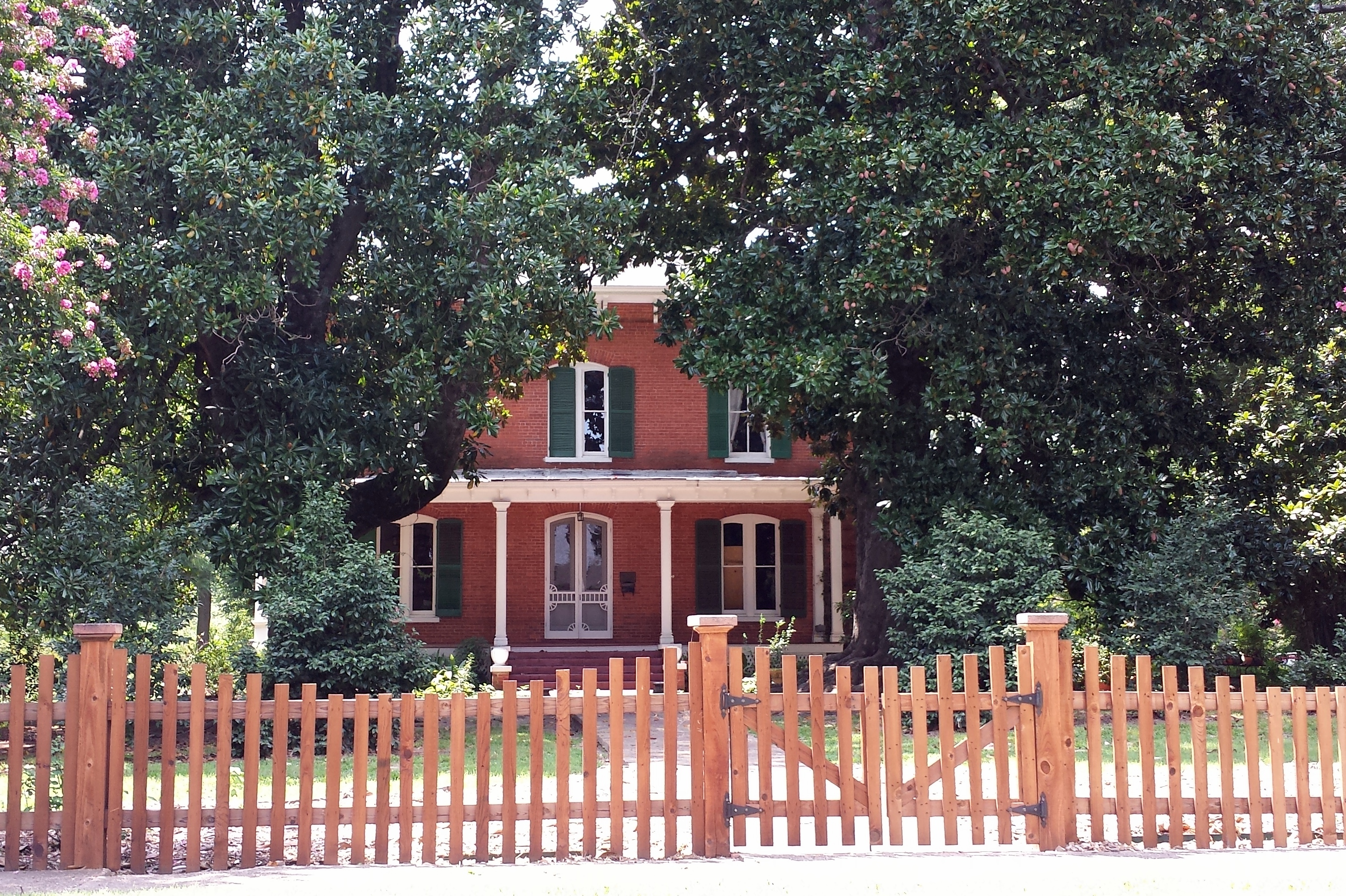

- Location within Arkansas Location within the United States
- Location: 713 N. Front St., Dardanelle, Arkansas
- Coordinates: 35°8′11″N 93°9′25″W
- Area: less than one acre
- Built: 1876
- Architectural style: Italianate
- NRHP reference No.: 82002151
- Added to NRHP: June 23, 1982

The Kimball House is a historic house at 713 North Front Street in Dardanelle, Arkansas. It is a two-story brick building, covered by a hip roof, with a single-story porch extending across the front, supported by square posts with chamfered corners and moulded capitals. The building corners have brick quoining, and the roof eave has paired brackets in the Italianate style. Windows are set in segmented-arch openings. Built in 1876, it is one of the city's finest examples of Italianate architecture.

The house was listed on the National Register of Historic Places in 1982.

== See also ==
- National Register of Historic Places listings in Yell County, Arkansas
