= Brearley Cemetery =

Historic cemetery in Arkansas, United States

- Brearley Cemetery Historic Section
- U.S. National Register of Historic Places
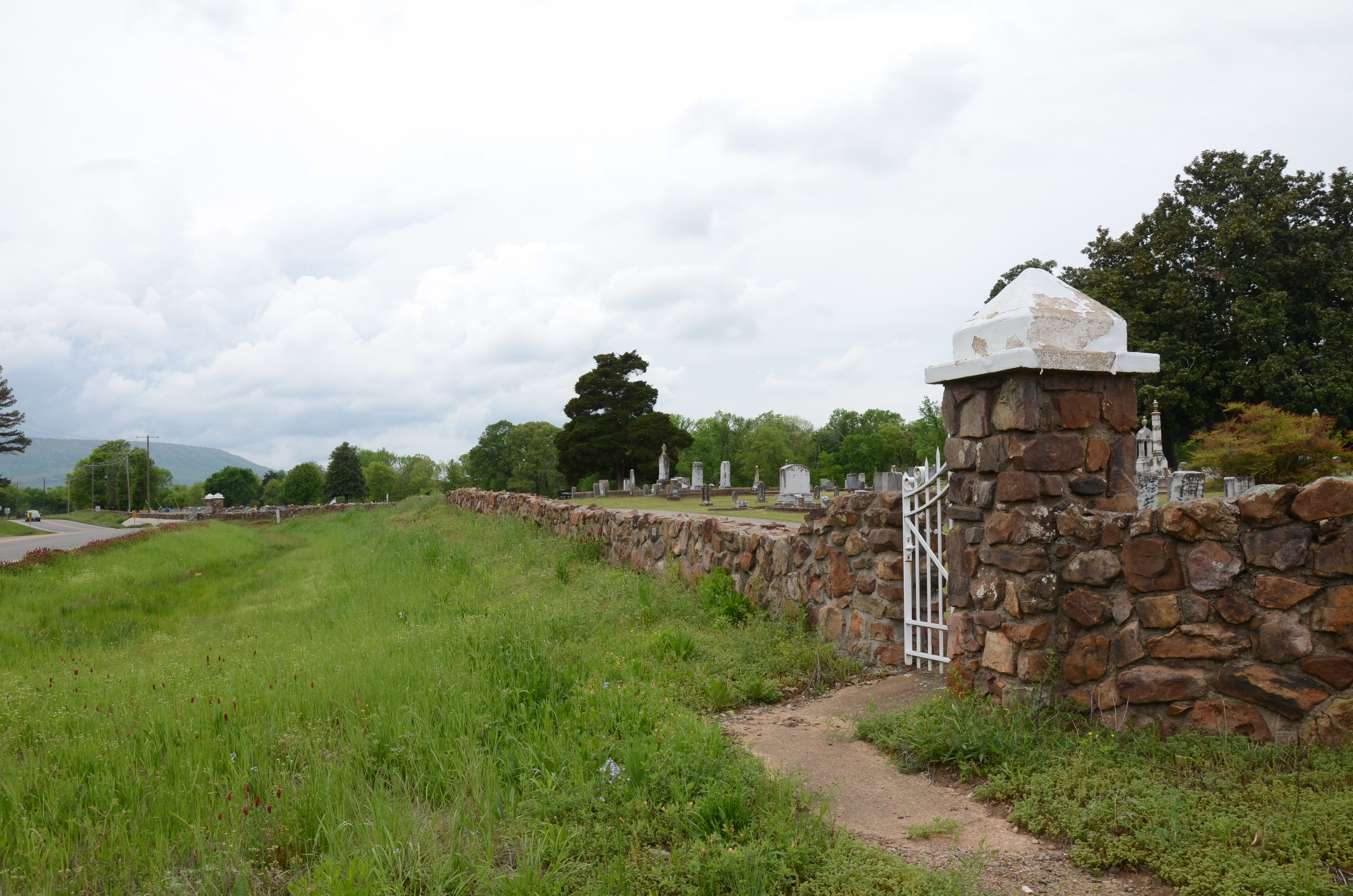

- Location within Arkansas Location within the United States
- Location: AR 27 approx. 0.5 miles (0.80 km) W of AR 22, Dardanelle, Arkansas
- Coordinates: 35°13′12″N 93°10′16″W
- Area: 15 acres (6.1 ha)
- Built: 1847
- NRHP reference No.: 07000975
- Added to NRHP: September 20, 2007

Brearley Cemetery, founded in 1847, is the oldest cemetery in the city of Dardanelle, Arkansas. It is located on the north side of Arkansas Highway 27, west of its junction with Arkansas Highway 22. The cemetery, still in active use, houses more than 2,000 burials, many of the descendants of the early Czech immigrants to the area. One marker, possibly a memorial marker, bears the date 1780, but its provenance and significance has not been established. A 15-acre (6.1 ha) section on the eastern side of the cemetery, where its oldest burials are located, was listed on the National Register of Historic Places in 2007.

An active cemetery, some of the notable burials include:

- Thomas Boles (1837–1905), US Congressman
- Bonnie Jean Brown (1938–2016), Singer
- Jack Zeller (1883–1969), Baseball executive

== See also ==
- National Register of Historic Places listings in Yell County, Arkansas
