= Sulphur Springs Cemetery (Sulphur Springs, Arkansas) =

Historic cemetery in Sulphur Springs, Yell County, Arkansas, United States

- U.S. National Register of Historic Places
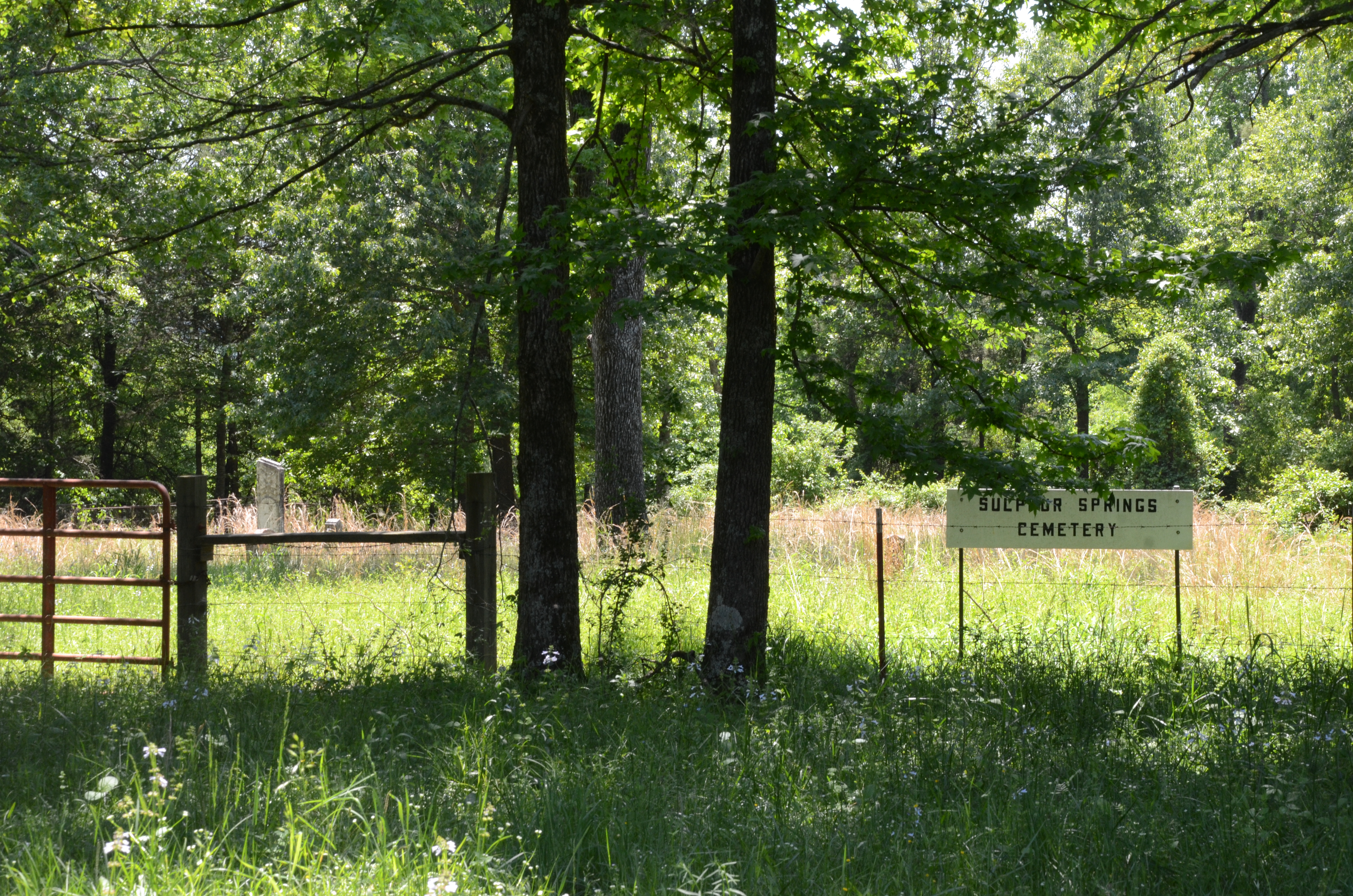
- Sulphur Springs Cemetery, May 2015

- Location within Arkansas Location within the United States
- Location: Slo Fork Rd., Sulphur Springs, Yell County, Arkansas
- Coordinates: 35°11′32″N 93°19′31″W
- Area: 4.5 acres (1.8 ha)
- Built: 1844
- NRHP reference No.: 12000038
- Added to NRHP: February 21, 2012

Sulphur Springs Cemetery is a historic cemetery in the unincorporated community of Sulphur Springs Yell County, Arkansas, United States, that is listed on the National Register of Historic Places (NRHP).

== Description ==
The cemetery is located northwest of Chickalah, on the south side of County Road 39 (Slo Fork Road), about 0.2 miles (0.32 km) west of its junction with County Road 38. The cemetery contains 26 marked burial sites on just over 1 acre (0.40 ha) of the 4.5 acres (1.8 ha) property, dating from 1844 to 1940. There are at least two known unmarked burials, and fieldstones in the cemetery may denote further sites. The cemetery is ringed by a barbed wire fence. It is one of the few surviving remnants of the former spa community of Sulphur Springs, which flourished here in the 19th century.

The cemetery was listed on the NRHP on February 21, 2012.

== See also ==
- National Register of Historic Places listings in Yell County, Arkansas
