= Steamboat House (Dardanelle, Arkansas) =

Historic house in Arkansas, United States

- U.S. National Register of Historic Places
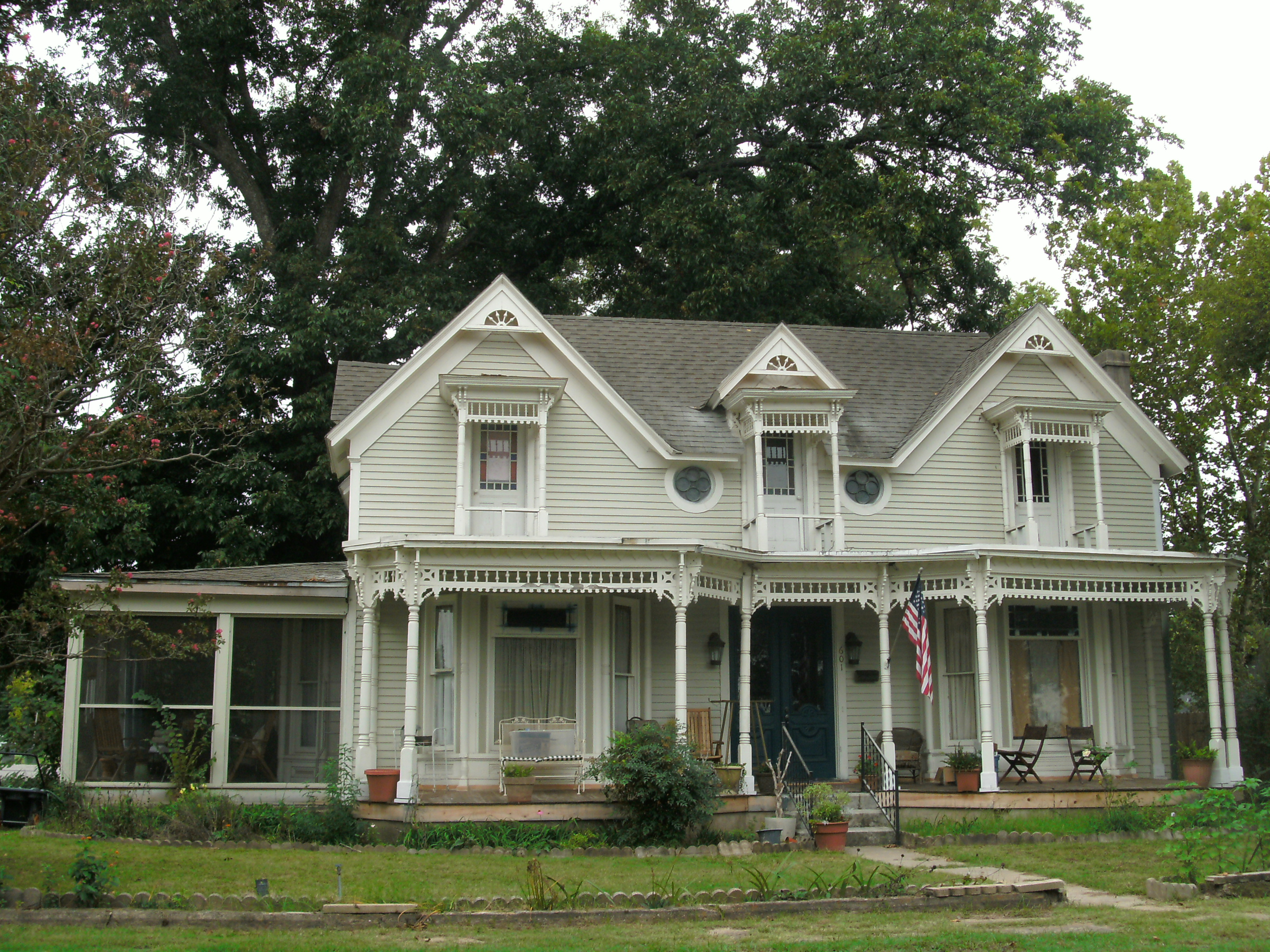

- Location within Arkansas Location within the United States
- Location: 601 N. Front St., Dardanelle, Arkansas
- Coordinates: 35°13′34″N 93°9′25″W
- Area: less than one acre
- Built: 1890
- Architectural style: Gothic, Steamboat Gothic
- NRHP reference No.: 75000420
- Added to NRHP: June 5, 1975

The Steamboat House is an historic house at 601 North Front Street in Dardanelle, Arkansas. A two-story wood-frame structure, it has cross-gabled roof and weatherboard siding. It is trimmed in the Carpenter Gothic style, with an open single-story porch that has turned posts and a spindled frieze. On the second floor there are doors leading to small balconies with similar decoration. The house was built about 1890, and is a local example of the Steamboat gothic style.

The house was listed on the National Register of Historic Places in 1975.

== See also ==
- National Register of Historic Places listings in Yell County, Arkansas
