= Sulphur Springs, Yell County, Arkansas =

Unincorporated community in Yell County, Arkansas, United States

Sulphur Springs, Arkansas
- Unincorporated community
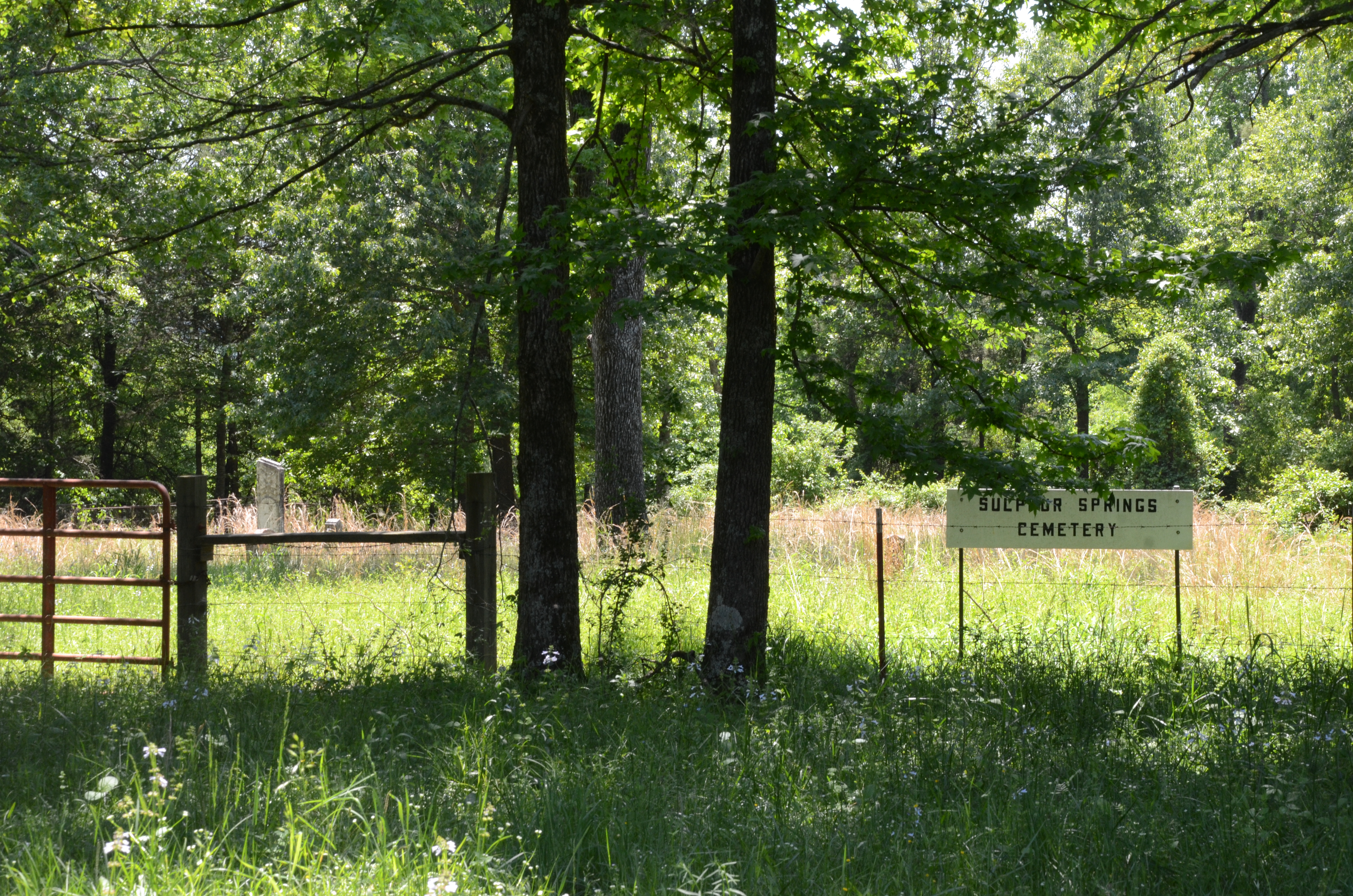
- Sulphur Springs Cemetery, May 2015

- Location within Arkansas Location within the United States
- Coordinates: 35°11′33″N 93°19′34″W
- Country: United States
- State: Arkansas
- County: Yell
- Elevation: 456 ft (139 m)
- Time zone: UTC-6 (Central (CST))
  - Summer (DST): UTC-5 (CDT)
- Area code: 479
- GNIS feature ID: 73777

Sulphur Springs is an unincorporated community in northern Yell County, Arkansas, United States.

== Description ==
The community is located approximately 10 miles (16 km) west-southwest of Dardanelle. The peak of Spring Mountain in southeast Logan County is about 1.5 miles (2.4 km) to the north.

The Sulphur Springs Cemetery is listed on the National Register of Historic Places.
