= Ludwig Mactarian =

American painter

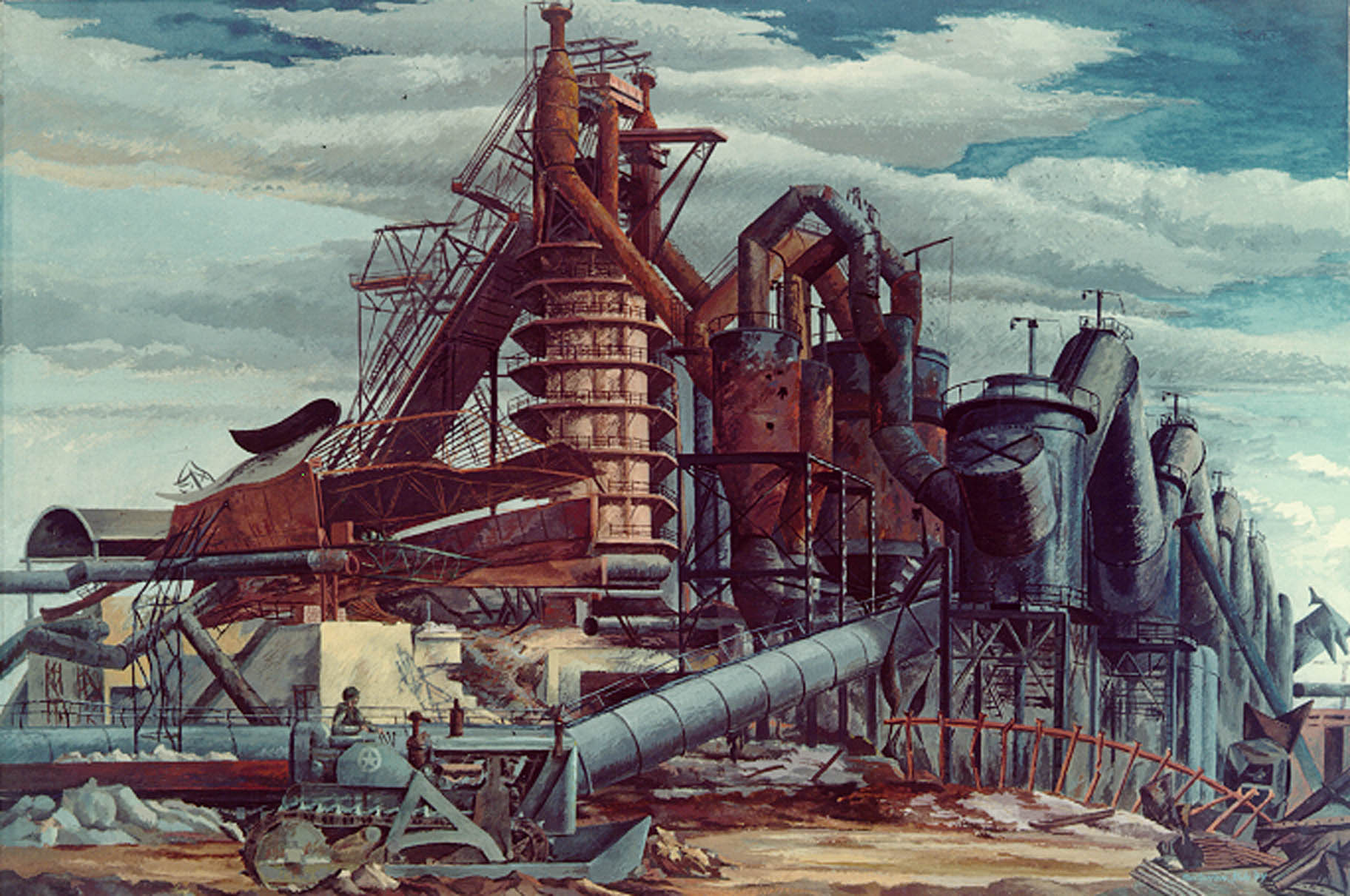
Factory at Piombino, 1944, Ludwig Mactarian

Ludwig Mactarian (sometimes spelled MacTarian or Mkitarian; January 1, 1908 – July 11, 1955) was an American painter, muralist and illustrator.

== Early life ==
Ludwig Mactarian was born on January 1, 1908; there is some confusion as to where. US Army induction records list his birthplace as 'French Asiatic Possessions', which may indicate Syria, which is stated as his birthplace in immigration records. Other sources name Smyrna, Anatolia, in the Ottoman Empire (modern İzmir, Turkey), and New York. He was an ethnic Armenian. He immigrated to the U.S. in 1921, arriving in New York City.

== Education ==
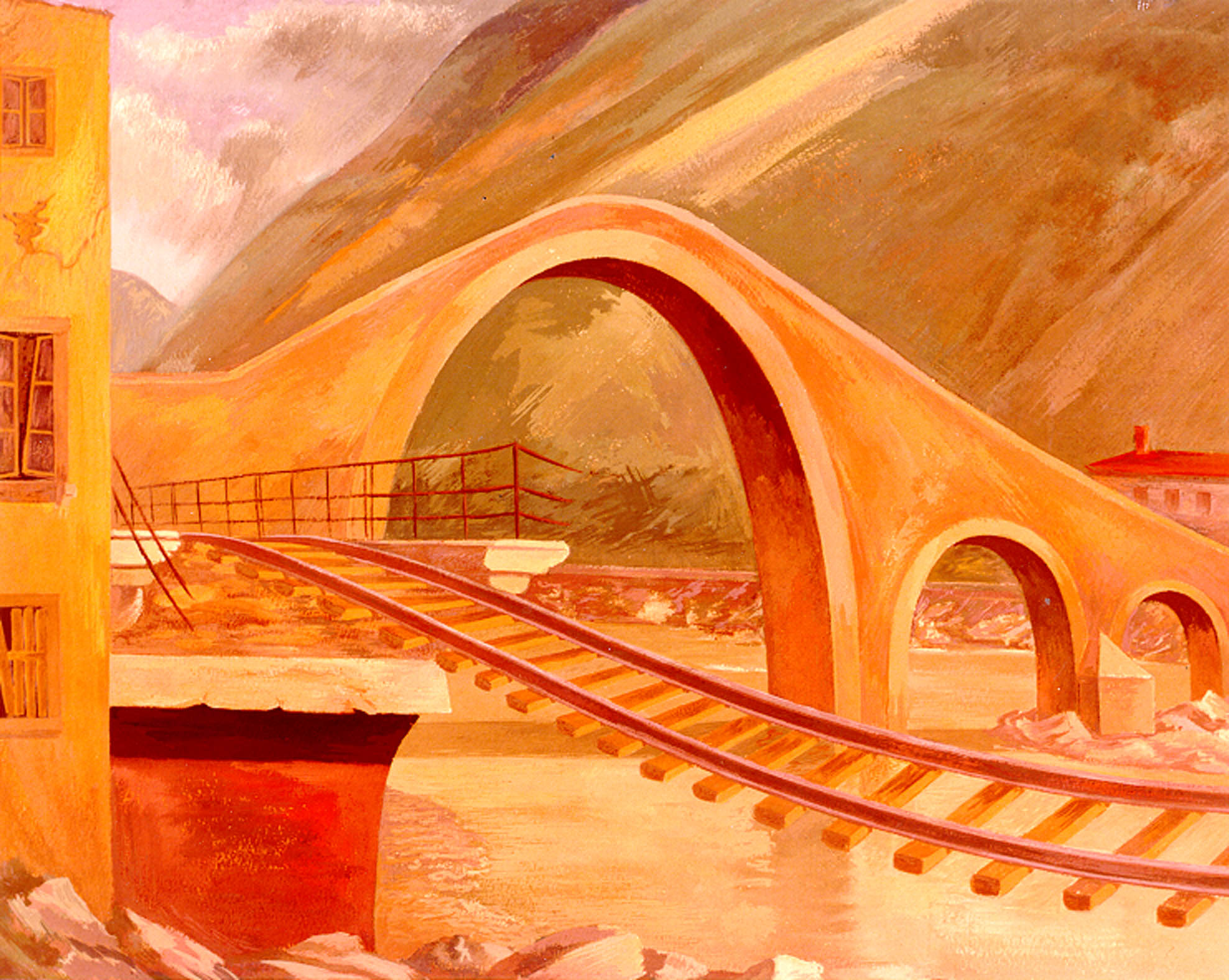
Madallena Bridge, 1944, Ludwig Mactarian

Surrounded by New York's emerging modern art scene, Mactarian studied painting at the National Academy of Design and learned printmaking and lithography at the Art Students League. His teachers included William Von Schlegell, Charles Locke, and George Picken.

== Career ==
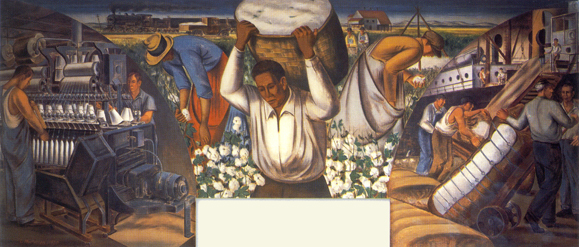
Cotton Growing, Manufacture, and Export, 1939, Ludwig Mactarian

In the 1920s and 30s Mactarian painted, made prints, and provided illustrations for periodicals and books, such as John Pfeiffer's popular Science in your Life. Like many artists during the Great Depression he did commissioned works as part of the Federal government's New Deal programs for the arts. In 1937 he assisted George Picken in creating the Hudson Falls, New York Post Office murals, and Reginald Marsh in creating murals for the New York Customs House. In 1939 he painted Cotton Growing, Manufacture, and Export, a striking (and still-extant) mural at the US Post Office in Dardanelle, Arkansas, for which he was paid $660 by the Treasury Department's Section of Fine Arts. Unable to afford travel to Dardanelle prior to installation, he researched ideas for the mural by studying the region at the New York Public Library, and by telephone conversations with Dardanelle's postmaster.

== World War II ==
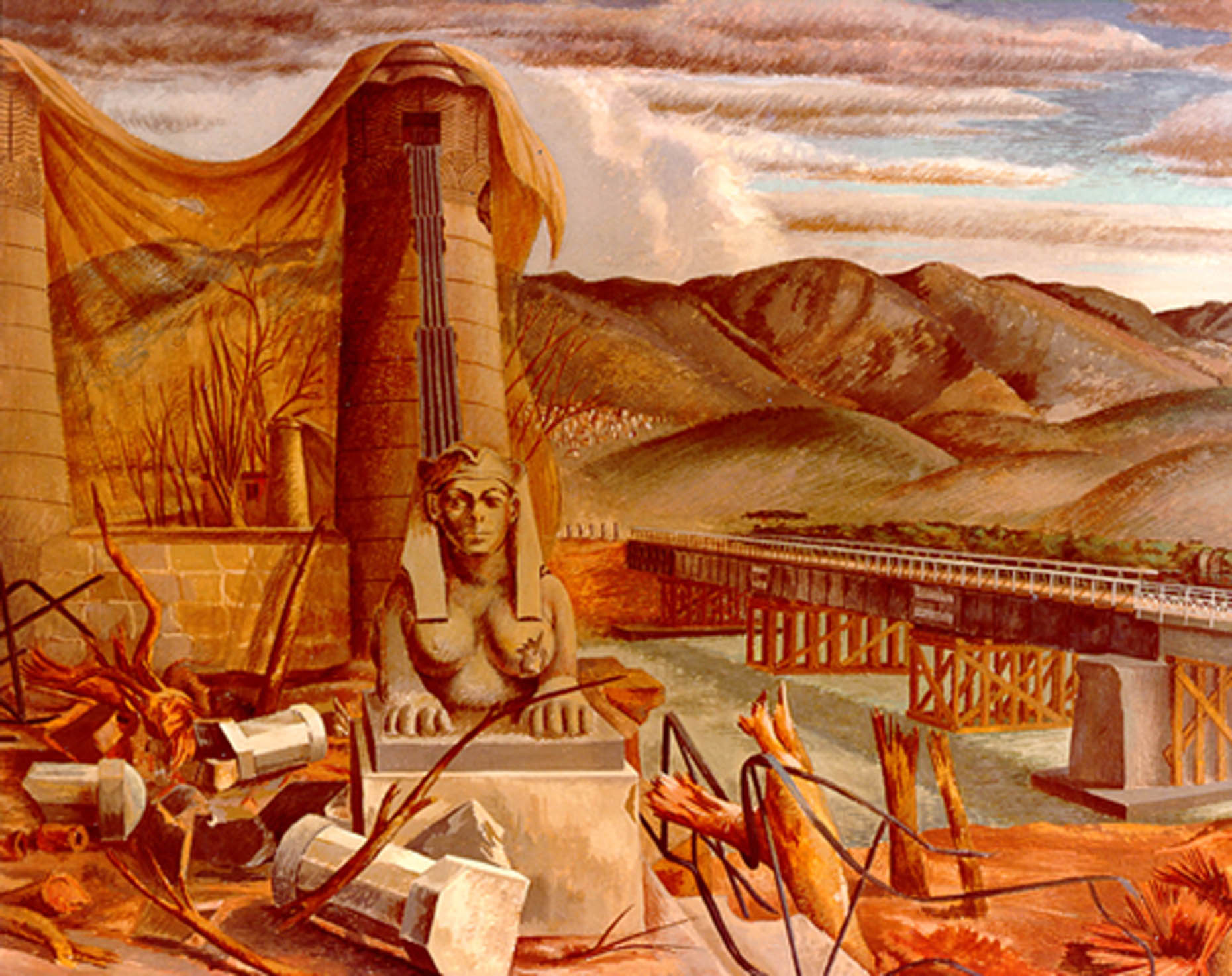
Garigliano River Bridge on Highway No. 7, 1944, Ludwig Mactarian

Early in 1941, with the Second World War erupting in Europe and Asia, Mactarian joined the United States Army. During training at Fort Dix, New Jersey, he was exposed to scarlet fever and placed in an isolation camp. While in quarantine he learned of a $12,000 prize for a contest to paint a 12-by-50-foot mural in the new War Department Building in Washington, D.C.; company officers, impressed with his sketches, provided him with materials and a private workroom in the Men’s Service Club. Mactarian didn't win the competition, but his work caught the attention of the War Art Advisory Committee, and he was assigned duty as a war artist. He served with the 337th Engineer General Service Regiment, part of the US Fifth Army, in the Italian Campaign, reaching the rank of TEC3 (Sergeant).

A series of paintings made in Italy in 1944/45 attracted considerable attention. Unlike many war artists, who depicted what they saw in a plain, illustrative style, Mactarian applied a Contemporary Realist approach to his paintings and drawings which at times bordered on Surrealism as they portrayed both the large-scale physical destruction of war and, particular to the Engineers, the striking incongruity of large geometric structures (such as pre-fabricated Bailey bridges, concrete bunkers, or gas pipelines) imposed on Italy's ancient landscapes.

== Later years ==
Mactarian exhibited at a number of museums and galleries around the US, including the Los Angeles Museum, the Corcoran Gallery of Art, Pennsylvania Academy, and the American Contemporary Artists (ACA) Gallery of New York.

He died on July 11, 1955, at age 47, and is buried at Long Island National Cemetery in Farmingdale, New York.
